= List of gardens in England =

Gardens in England is a link page for any garden, botanical garden, arboretum or pinetum open to the public in England. The National Gardens Scheme also opens many small, interesting, private gardens to the public on one or two days a year for charity.

== National ==
- List of sites on the National Register of Historic Parks and Gardens

== Bedfordshire ==
- Whipsnade Tree Cathedral
- Wrest Park Gardens

== Berkshire ==
- Caversham Court
- Deanery Garden
- Folly Farm, Sulhamstead
- Forbury Gardens
- Frogmore
- Harris Garden
- Welford Park

== Buckinghamshire ==
- Ascott
- Cliveden
- The Manor House, Bledlow
- Stowe Landscape Garden
- Waddesdon
- West Wycombe Park

== Cambridgeshire ==
- Anglesey Abbey
- Cambridge University Botanic Garden
- Christ's College, Cambridge

== Cheshire ==
- Jodrell Bank Arboretum
- Ness Botanic Gardens
- Tatton Park - National Trust

== Cornwall ==
Gardens in Cornwall:

- Antony House, Antony
- Caerhays
- Carclew
- Chyverton
- Cotehele
- Eden Project
- Glendurgan, Mawnan Smith
- Ince Castle
- Lamellen
- Lanhydrock House, Lanhydrock
- Longcross Victorian Gardens, near Port Isaac
- Lost Gardens of Heligan
- Mary Newman's Cottage, Saltash
- Morrab Gardens, Penzance
- Pencarrow, near Egloshyale
- Penjerrick Garden, Budock
- Pine Lodge
- Probus Gardens, Probus
- St Michael's Mount
- Trebah
- Trelissick Garden
- Tremeer, near St Tudy
- Trengwainton Garden, Madron
- Trerice, near Newlyn East
- Tresco Abbey Gardens, Isles of Scilly
- Trewithen, near Probus

== Cumbria ==
- Holehird Gardens
- Holker Hall
- Levens Hall

== Derbyshire ==
- Chatsworth
- Dunge Valley Hidden Garden

== Devon ==
- Bicton Park
- Castle Drogo
- Coleton Fishacre
- Escot Park
- The Garden House, at Buckland Monachorum
- Holbrook Garden, near Tiverton
- Killerton
- Knightshayes
- Marwood Hill
- Plant World
- Rosemoor Garden - Royal Horticultural Society
- Tapeley Park Gardens
- Winsford Walled Garden

== Dorset ==
- Abbotsbury Subtropical Gardens
- Bennetts Water Gardens
- Chiswell Walled Garden
- Compton Acres
- Easton Gardens
- Governor's Community Garden
- Knoll Gardens
- Mapperton
- Minterne Gardens
- Nothe Gardens
- Thomas Hardy's Cottage
- Victoria Gardens
- Weymouth Peace Garden

== East Riding of Yorkshire ==
- Burnby Hall Gardens

== East Sussex ==
- Bateman's
- Charleston Manor
- Great Dixter
- Merriments
- Sheffield Park

== Essex ==
- Gibberd Garden
- See also: Category: Gardens in Essex

== Gloucestershire ==
- Barnsley House
- Batsford Arboretum
- Hidcote Manor Garden
- Kiftsgate Court Gardens
- Owlpen
- Sezincote
- Westbury Court
- Westonbirt Arboretum

== Greater London ==
- Capel Manor College, London Borough of Enfield
- Chelsea Physic Garden
- Chiswick House
- Hall Place and Gardens, London Borough of Bexley
- Hampton Court
- The Hill Garden and Pergola, London Borough of Camden
- Holland Park, including The Kyoto Garden
- Kensington Gardens (and Hyde Park)
- Gardens of Kenwood House (on Hampstead Heath)
- Kew Gardens, also listed under Surrey below
- St James's Park

== Greater Manchester ==
- Fletcher Moss Botanical Garden

== Hampshire ==
- Exbury Gardens
- Furzey Gardens
- Hinton Ampner
- Longstock Park
- Mottisfont Abbey
- Sir Harold Hillier Gardens
- Staunton Country Park
- The Vyne
- West Green House

== Herefordshire ==
- The Laskett Gardens

== Hertfordshire ==
- Benington Lordship
- Gardens of the Rose
- Hatfield House

== Isles of Scilly ==
- Carreg Dhu
- Tresco

== Kent ==
- Bedgebury National Pinetum
- Doddington Place Gardens
- Emmetts Garden
- Goodnestone Park
- Great Comp Garden, near Borough Green
- Groombridge Place
- Hever Castle
- Hole Park
- Leeds Castle
- Marle Place
- Mount Ephraim Gardens, near Faversham
- Penshurst Place
- Pines Garden (Near St Margerets Bay)
- Scotney Castle
- Sissinghurst Garden
- Yalding Organic Gardens

== Lancashire ==
- Avenham Park
- Bank Hall Gardens
- Gresgarth Hall
- Rufford Old Hall

== Merseyside ==
- Hesketh Park, Southport
- Sefton Park
- Southport Botanic Gardens

== Norfolk ==
- East Ruston Old Vicarage
- Fairhaven Gardens
- Foggy Bottom
- Mannington Gardens
- Plantation Garden

== North Yorkshire ==
- Burnby Hall Gardens, Pocklington
- The Forbidden Corner, Middleham
- Harlow Carr Botanical Gardens, Royal Horticultural Society
- Helmsley Walled Garden
- Museum Gardens, York
- Parcevall Hall Gardens, Skipton
- Rievaulx Terrace & Temples, Helmsley - National Trust
- Thorp Perrow Arboretum

== Northamptonshire ==
- Cottesbrook Hall

== Northumberland ==
- Belsay Hall
- Cragside
- Wallington, Northumberland

== Oxfordshire ==
- Blenheim Palace
- Harcourt Arboretum
- Oxford University Parks
- Rousham House
- University of Oxford Botanic Garden
- Westwell Manor

== Rutland ==
- Barnsdale Gardens

== Shropshire ==
- Hodnet Hall
- Wollerton Old Hall

== Somerset ==
- Barrington Court
- Cothay Manor
- Dunster Castle
- East Lambrook Manor
- Folly Farm, Somerset
- Gauldon Manor Garden
- Hadspen House
- Hestercombe House
- Prior Park Landscape Garden
- The Walled Gardens of Cannington

== South Yorkshire ==
- Sheffield Botanical Gardens

== Staffordshire ==
- Biddulph Grange

== Suffolk ==
- Helmingham Hall
- Somerleyton Hall

== Surrey ==
- Busbridge Lakes
- Claremont
- Hatchlands
- Loseley Park
- Painshill Park
- Polesden Lacey
- Ramster
- Royal Botanic Gardens, Kew, also listed under Greater London above
- Royal Horticultural Society Garden, Wisley
- Savill Garden
- Sutton Place
- Titsey Place
- Valley Gardens
- Winkworth Arboretum

== Sussex ==
- See East Sussex and West Sussex

== West Sussex ==
- Borde Hill Garden
- High Beeches Gardens
- Highdown Gardens
- Leonardslee
- Nymans
- Royal Pavilion
- St. Mary's House
- Stansted Park
- Wakehurst Place

== Wiltshire ==
- Bowood House
- The Courts Garden
- Iford Manor
- Lacock Abbey
- Stourhead

== Worcestershire ==
- Bodenham Arboretum
- The Leasowes

== Yorkshire ==
- See East Riding of Yorkshire, South Yorkshire and North Yorkshire

== Isle of Wight ==
- Ventnor Botanic Garden

== See also ==
- English garden
- List of gardens
- List of botanical gardens
- Gardens in Scotland
- Gardens in Wales
- Gardens in Northern Ireland
