= Listed buildings in Stamford Bridge, East Riding of Yorkshire =

Stamford Bridge is a civil parish in the county of the East Riding of Yorkshire, England. It contains 13 listed buildings that are recorded in the National Heritage List for England. Of these, two are listed at Grade II*, the middle of the three grades, and the others are at Grade II, the lowest grade. The parish contains the village of Stamford Bridge and the surrounding area. Passing through the village is the River Derwent, and a road bridge and a railway viaduct crossing it are listed. The other listed buildings include houses, a lock on the Derwent Navigation, a former watermill, a public house, a chapel and a former railway station.

== Key ==
Grade	Criteria
II*	Particularly important buildings of more than special interest
II	Buildings of national importance and special interest

== Buildings ==
Name and location	Photograph	Date	Notes	Grade
Stamford Bridge Lock; 53.99207°N 0.91602°W		c. 1720	The lock on the disused Derwent Navigation is in stone. It consists of a short upstream cut to a large serpentine basin which narrows abruptly to the downstream gate, which is followed by a long serpentine cut with stepped sides and passing places for boats.	II
Ashburnholme; 53.99158°N 0.91237°W	—	Early 18th century	The house is in red brick, with a ribbed floor band, a deep dentilled brick eaves cornice, and a pantile roof with four courses of stone slates and tumbled-in brick to the raised gables. There are two storeys and three bays. The doorway has a bracketed canopy, and the windows are sashes, on the ground floor under flat arches, and on the upper floor under timber lintels.	II
Stamford Bridge; 53.99138°N 0.91627°W		1727	The bridge carries the A166 road over the River Derwent. It was designed by William Etty, it is in stone, and was widened on the south side in the 19th century. The bridge consists of a central segmental arch with refuges, flanked by smaller semicircular arches. The bridge deck is ramped, and has a string course and a low parapet.	II*
The Corn Mill; 53.99161°N 0.91324°W		1750 (probable)	The watermill, which was extended in the 19th century, has since been converted for other uses. It is in red-brown brick and stone, with hipped pantile roofs. The main block has five storeys and a basement, and seven bays, and a two-storey two-bay projecting on the front over the middle three bays. The basement has four round arches for sluices. Elsewhere, there are casement windows, and at the rear, the roof has raised coped gables on shaped kneelers.	II
Vine House; 53.99178°N 0.91167°W	—	Mid to late 18th century	The house is in brown brick, with a floor band, a stepped brick eaves cornice, and a pantile roof with tumbled-in brick to the raised gables. There are two storeys and three bays. The central doorway has fluted Doric half-columns, an entablature, and a fanlight with latticed glazing. The windows are sashes under flat gauged brick arches, with shutters.	II
Riverside Cottage; 53.99174°N 0.91177°W	—	Late 18th century	The house is in grey-brown brick with a pantile roof. There are two storeys and three bays. The central doorway has fluted half-columns and an entablature. To its right is a canted bay window, and on the extreme left is a round-headed passage doorway. The other windows are sashes, the ground floor window under a slightly cambered gauged brick arch.	II
The Manor House; 53.99219°N 0.91714°W	—	Late 18th century	The house is in brown brick, with a moulded timber eaves cornice, and a slate roof with raised gables. There are two storeys and four bays. On the front is a Doric doorcase with an entablature, and the doorway has a fanlight in panelled reveals and a soffit. The windows are sashes under slightly cambered brick arches.	II
18 Main Street; 53.99130°N 0.91183°W	—	Late 18th to early 19th century	The house is in brown brick, with a dentilled brick eaves cornice, and a pantile roof with tumbled-in brick to the raised gables. There are two storeys and three bays. The central doorway has a divided fanlight, and the windows are sashes, those on the ground floor under flat brick arches. The upper floor windows are horizontally sliding sashes under timber lintels.	II
1 The Square; 53.99103°N 0.91415°W	—	Late 18th to early 19th century	The house, later used for other purposes, is in brown brick, and has a slate roof with raised coped gables on shaped kneelers. There are two storeys and a basement, and three bays. Steps with an openwork wrought iron balustrade and handrails, lead up to the central doorway that has pilasters, and contains a fanlight in panelled reveals and a soffit. The windows are sashes under cambered gauged brick arches.	II
Bay Horse Inn; 53.99097°N 0.91330°W		Late 18th to early 19th century	The public house is in brown brick, and has a clay roof with tumbled-in brick to the raised gables. There are two storeys and attics, four bays, and a continuous rear outshut. The main doorway has pilasters, and a fanlight with radial glazing in panelled reveals and a soffit, and to the left is a smaller doorway. The windows are sashes under slightly cambered gauged brick arches.	II
Wesleyan Methodist Chapel; 53.99087°N 0.91489°W		1828	The chapel is in grey brick, with stone dressings, clasping corner pilasters, a floor band, a moulded timber eaves cornice, and a hipped slate roof. There are two storeys and four bays. In the centre is a porch containing double doors, and the windows are round-headed sashes with radial glazing and red brick voussoirs.	II
Former railway station and platforms 53.98826°N 0.91507°W		1847	The railway station, which has been converted for other uses, was designed by G. T. Andrews for the York and North Midland Railway Company. It is in red-gey brick on a plinth, with stone dressings, a moulded sill band, oversailing eaves and a slate roof. There are two storeys, three bays, an outshut on the right and a rear wing. On the front is a stone tetrastyle portico of Tuscan pilasters, with an entablature and a blocking course. The doorways have fanlights, the windows are sashes, and all are under slightly cambered gauged brick arches. On the left return is a canted bay window, and on the rear wing is a verandah with cast iron columns. The platforms have brick walls with stone capping.	II
Railway viaduct 53.98986°N 0.92072°W		1847	The viaduct, now disused, which was built for the York and North Midland Railway Company, carries its line over the River Derwent. Crossing the river is a cast iron elliptical arch, and this is flanked by ten round-headed arches to the south and five to the north. These are in red brick with imposts, a stone band, and a low parapet with stone coping. The arch over the river has trellis work to the spandrels, a timber deck, and a cast iron balustrade.	II*
