= Stamford Bridge Viaduct =

Railway viaduct in Yorkshire, England

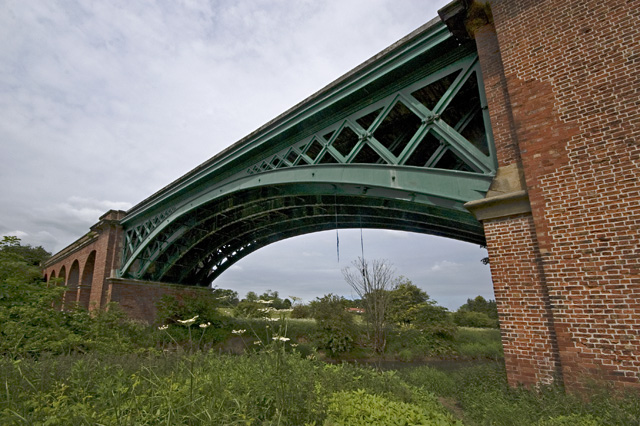
- Stamford Bridge Viaduct
- Coordinates: 53.9898°N 0.9205°W
- OS grid reference: SE708554
- Crosses: River Derwent
- Locale: Stamford Bridge, East Riding of Yorkshire, England
- Other name: Derwent Viaduct
- Owner: East Riding County Council

History
- Opened: 1847
- Closed: 1965 (to rail traffic)

Statistics

Listed Building – Grade II*
- Designated: 26 January 1967
- Reference no.: 1083841

Location
- Interactive map of Stamford Bridge Viaduct

Stamford Bridge Viaduct is a disused railway crossing over the River Derwent on the border between the East Riding of Yorkshire and North Yorkshire, England. The viaduct used to carry the York–Beverley line between 1847 and 1965. The central ironwork span is thought to be the last of its type in existence that was built for a railway; all other similar types having since been demolished.

== History ==
The viaduct was opened in 1847 when the York & North Midland Railway completed their line between York and Market Weighton. (Note: The line was always intended to extend to Beverley, but the section from Market Weighton to Beverley did not open until 1865. This was in part down to the "Shady dealings" of George Hudson, which caused a postponement of the line.) The viaduct straddles the River Derwent, which is the county dividing line between what is now York, but was the old North Riding of Yorkshire, and East Yorkshire in this area. The viaduct has five rounded red-brick arches on the northern (York) side of the river, a central section that is 90 feet (27 m) long and 12 feet (3.7 m) high, which consists of ironwork, and ten rounded red-brick arches on the south (Market Weighton) side of the river. The red-brick arches are each 24 feet (7.3 m) across, and the bridge was designed by John Cass Birkinshaw with engineering undertaken by Jackson & Bean for the main structure, and Gilkes Wilson and Co. for the ironwork. The whole structure extends for 180 yards (160 m) and the central ironwork section is 60 feet (18 m) above the water level. The river normally flows only underneath the cast-iron section, but the arches at either side were built instead of embankments due to the valley being low-lying and subject to extreme flooding.

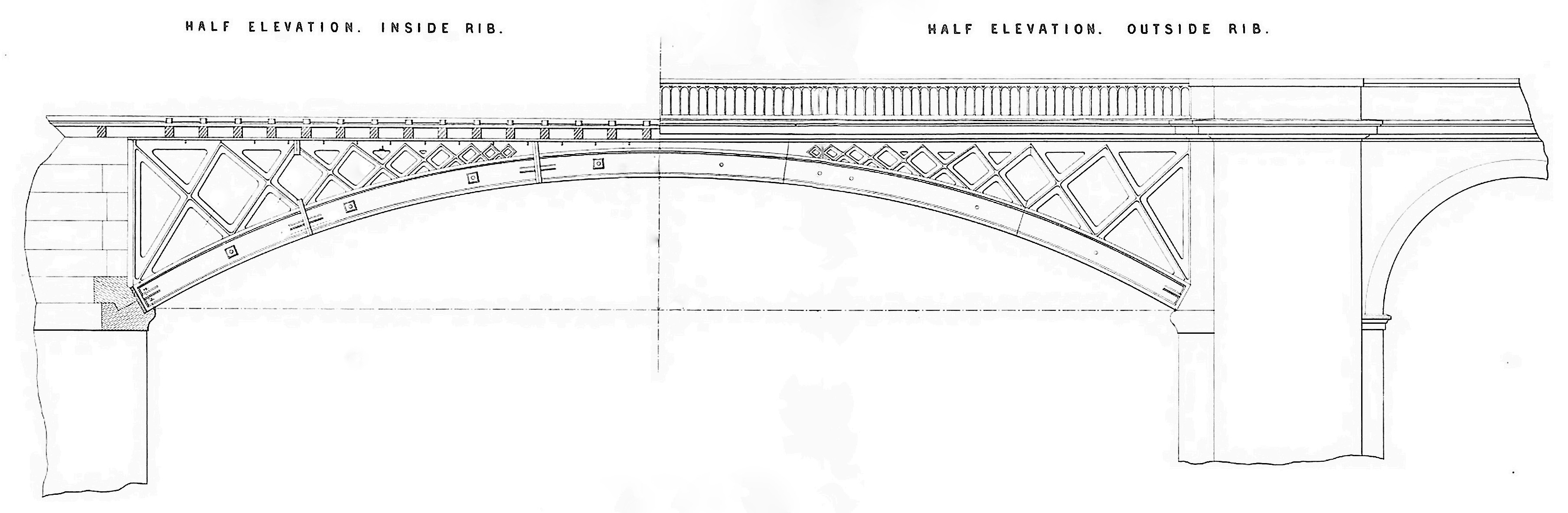
Stamford Bridge Viaduct)

The railway across the bridge was closed in 1965, and the trackbed has since been converted into a cycle path (NCN66). The viaduct was under threat of demolition in the early 1970s, and again in 1991, but this was not carried out and the structure was restored in 2005. In the 1970s, it was estimated that upkeep of the unused structure would cost £35,000 to repair, and a further £700 per year (in 1974 pricing) to maintain. In 1981, British Rail sold the viaduct to the East Yorkshire County Council for £1, and it was determined that renovating the viaduct would cost £350,000.

The bridge was sometimes referred to as Derwent Viaduct, and is thought to have been the only substantial viaduct within East Yorkshire. The segmented cast iron bridge span is now probably the oldest of its type in existence that was constructed for a railway; other similar bridges were built for waggonways or narrow-gauge lines and have since been demolished. The bridge straddles the county boundary between the East Riding of Yorkshire and North Yorkshire (now York Unitary Authority) and is in two parishes; Kexby on the York side and the parish of Stamford Bridge on the East Riding side. The viaduct is recorded with Historic England as a Grade II* listed structure. The viaduct also forms the western boundary of Stamford Bridge Conservation Area; initially it was omitted from the conservation area on account that it was intended to be demolished.

== See also ==
- Grade II* listed buildings in the East Riding of Yorkshire
- Listed buildings in Stamford Bridge, East Riding of Yorkshire
- Stamford Bridge, road bridge across the same river, further upstream
