= William Richardson (astronomer) =

British astronomer

- Born: 2 February 1796; Pocklington, Yorkshire
- Died: 23 March 1872 (aged 76); Pocklington, Yorkshire
- Children: 9
- Awards: Gold Medal of the Royal Astronomical Society (1830)
- Scientific career
- Fields: Astronomy
- Institutions: Greenwich, London

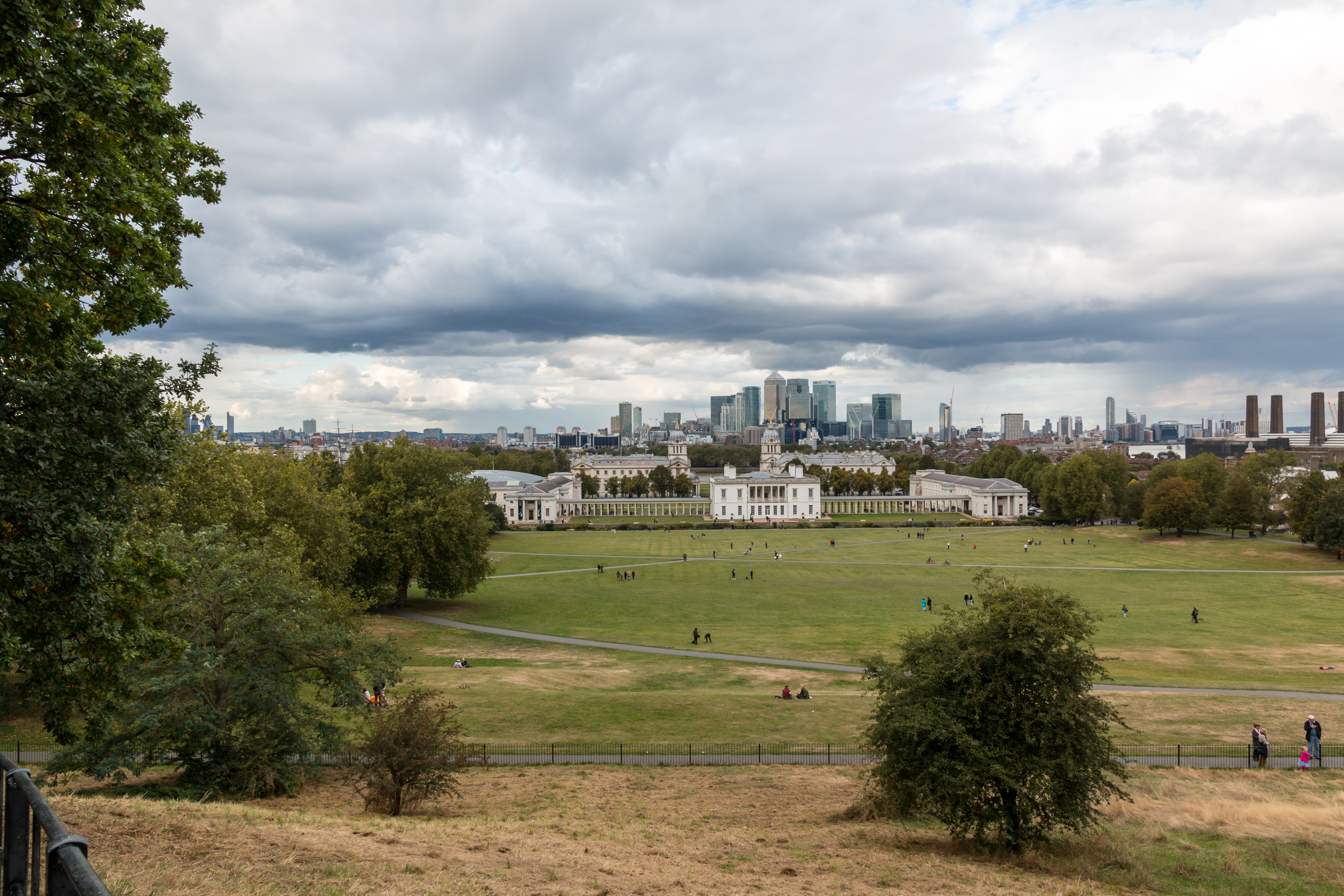
Greenwich, London (Work Place)

William Richardson (2 February 1796 – 23 March 1872) was a notable British astronomer at Greenwich Observatory who was later accused of murder.

Richardson was an amateur scientist who had an interest in the field of astronomy and was appointed in 1822 to work as an assistant at the observatory. In 1830 he was awarded the prestigious Gold Medal of the Royal Astronomical Society for outstanding researches which contributed to astronomy and geophysics, especially the pioneering work he did on the Constant of aberration.

== Background ==
William Richardson was born at Pocklington, Yorkshire. He was married to Anne Rogerson in the year 1821, a lady who was about two years younger than him. He already had six children by the time George Biddell Airy joined the Observatory. By the time he left the observatory he had nine surviving children in all.

During the census of 1841, he was staying in Greenwich with his two daughters Amelia and Ann Maria. During this period, he was staying separately from his wife who was staying at Chapmangate in Pocklington with the other children: Louisa, Lavinia, Lucy, and Julia. She was listed there as the head of this household, which meant that the two of them were separated at the time. In the following census of 1851, he was staying in Pocklington with three children of his, namely Lucy, William, and Julia with no mention of his wife's whereabouts.

Richardson became involved in a scandal which led to his arrest in January 1846 in Pocklington. He was then charged the following month, February, for colluding with his daughter in the murder of Theodore Horatio Richardson who was their incest son. On 11 May 1846, the two were put to trial at the Old Bailey court. He was then relieved of his job at the Observatory even though incest was not considered a crime in those days in Britain. The matter might have been dismissed had he not made the mistake of burying his son secretly in their garden, where a labourer digging a cesspool for Richardson discovered the child's coffin on 22 January 1846. In addition, neither the birth nor the death of the child had been recorded with the authorities. This then became the basis of the murder charge against him. This incident drew the attention from local to national audiences, with the proceedings of the court receiving considerable coverage by the major newspapers. The charges against the two were later dropped leading to their acquittal by the court. After this incident, Richardson moved back to live in Pocklington, where he lived until his death at the age of 75.

== Career ==
William Richardson was a blacksmith in his home village of Pocklington and was recommended to the Astronomer Royal by Troughton, a maker of instruments. This recommendation saw him given the position of assistant at the Royal Observatory at an annual salary of £100 plus £10 additional payment on consecutive three years in the service plus other allowances. His housing was also paid for by the Admiralty in order to provide suitable accommodation for him on his arrival at the Observatory. In the year 1830, he moved to a cottage on by road at Gang Lane now referred to as the Circus Street.

Richardson was acting as an advisor to Astronomer Royal John Pond when the latter decided in 1825 to increase the staffing at the Observatory by adding two new members. It was Richardson's recommendation to Pond that saw the recruitment of Yorkshiremen William Rogerson and Thomas Eli, which meant that half of the assistants at the observatory were from Yorkshire. Richardson was offered the position to become the director at the Madras Observatory in East India Company, but declined the offer due to alleged health concerns he had. This could have been a topflight position in his career had he not forgone it at this moment when he was full of ego.

In 1835, when Pond was preparing for his departure from the Observatory, he gave judgment on his six assistants saying that Richardson was the person he most regarded in the position, relating that he had been recommended for the position of an assistant by the late Mr. Troughton due to his knowledge in Elementary Mathematics. He was also considered as a "first-rate observer with the Circle" because of his immense mastery of the Circle computations and had also tasked with computing for other peoples catalogs especially the ones for Sir Thomas Brisbane, which had led to an increment in the salary he was being paid. The responsibilities highlighted for Richardson by the observatory before the reign of George Biddell Airy included doing the computations regarding the Troughton Circle and Jones Circle, although the payable amounts he was given for these external jobs was not clearly stated.

In 1835, when Pond was replaced by Airy, the standards at the observatory were falling. Airy came with the ambition to give the Observatory a new thrust and wanted to lay off the first assistants, one of whom was Richardson, even though the latter had received the Royal Astronomical Society's gold medal. This later helped him survive when the Observatory supported Airy's request which saw the laying off of his colleague Tailor. The coming of Airy to the Observatory marked the beginning of frustrating times to Richardson at Greenwich. When Airy was given the permission to amend the allowances in the year 1836, he ripped most off their allowances after which Richardson only received about £60 for rent and other domestic expenses e.g. coal fuel. Airy also managed to further the financial frustration of Richardson by blocking the traditional triennial pay rise, although this was overturned back to normal in 1843. The roles Richardson undertook in the reign of Airy were also changed, which saw him being limited to just making the observations with regard to the Equatorials, the Mural circle and the Zenith sector followed by diminishing them as requested.

Richardson's career at the Observatory in Greenwich ended in 1845 when he was released from his position by Airy due to his personal lifestyle issues. Though the incest wasn't much of a crime back then, he was still surrounded by several scandals and unsolved conspiracies about the death of his baby son. He was also charged for concealing the child from the registrar and ultimately for murder, which sealed his fate at the Observatory.

William Richardson was able to amass some considerable wealth in terms of several properties that he had acquired during his lifetime from 1792 to 1872 when he eventually died. These were in both Greenwich and Pocklington. The property holdings he had in Greenwich were: two neighbouring houses in Royal Hill and another one to the south of the junction of Peyton's area. He had further had acquired two more properties just adjacent to the first properties that he had. Among them was a big cottage in Peyton's place which was facing to the front of the glebe-house. This was the house that Richardson had stayed in in the year 1845. The fourth property that William Richardson owned was at the Royal Hill corner and Peyton's area. It was attached to a workshop. He then decided to sell all his properties and move to Pocklington.

Richardson was also able to acquire several other properties in Pocklington including The Star, an ancient building with a thatched roof, which was later damaged in a fire that had spread from the adjourning brewhouse on 4 March 1845. These buildings were later re-built and still exist as a result of the then modern London architecture that was used to design them. He had also had eight other properties in and around the market place. These included the Brewhouse and the residential area that he stayed in at the Parramatta Villa. His house was built in the 1861 to 1871 period. After his death, the building was sold and later its name changed from Parramatta Villa to Sherbutt House. This building was later modified to be used as an educational establishment by Charles Nichols.

== Achievements ==
During his period at the Royal Observatory, Richardson was credited with the data calculations which enabled the making of "A catalog of 7385 stars: chiefly in the southern hemisphere, prepared from observations made ... at the observatory at Parramatta, New South Wales ...”. In a piece published later in the year 1835 by the Admiralty. Richardson was also credited with an investigation into the subject of the Constant of aberration which won him the gold medal of the Royal Astronomical Society for his work. This work also inspired him to write about this topic in his book on Constant of Aberration a masterpiece of that time which was held highly by the astronomers in that period.

Richardson had vast knowledge in the field of Elementary Mathematics, a strength of his mental capabilities. He was thus able to keep the Circle computations in an organised way and was "a first-rate observer with the Circle" as described by Mr. Troughton. This trait really made him a real asset to the Royal Observatory. He was even able to make calculations for others which even involved cataloging for Sir Thomas Brisbane and the astronomical society.

== Publications and works ==
Richardson wrote a book on the investigation into the Constant of Aberration which was highly valued by the Royal Astronomical Society and the astronomers of his days. Later, he worked on “A catalog of 7385 stars: chiefly in the southern hemisphere, prepared from observations made ...” at the Parramatta observatory in New South Wales. The Admiralty then published it in the year 1835. He later wrote an article on the "Greenwich assistants during 250 years "which was published several years later in 1925 by Henry Hollis.
