= St John the Baptist's Church, Stamford Bridge =

Church in the East Riding of Yorkshire, England

Coordinates: 53°59′24″N 0°54′44″W

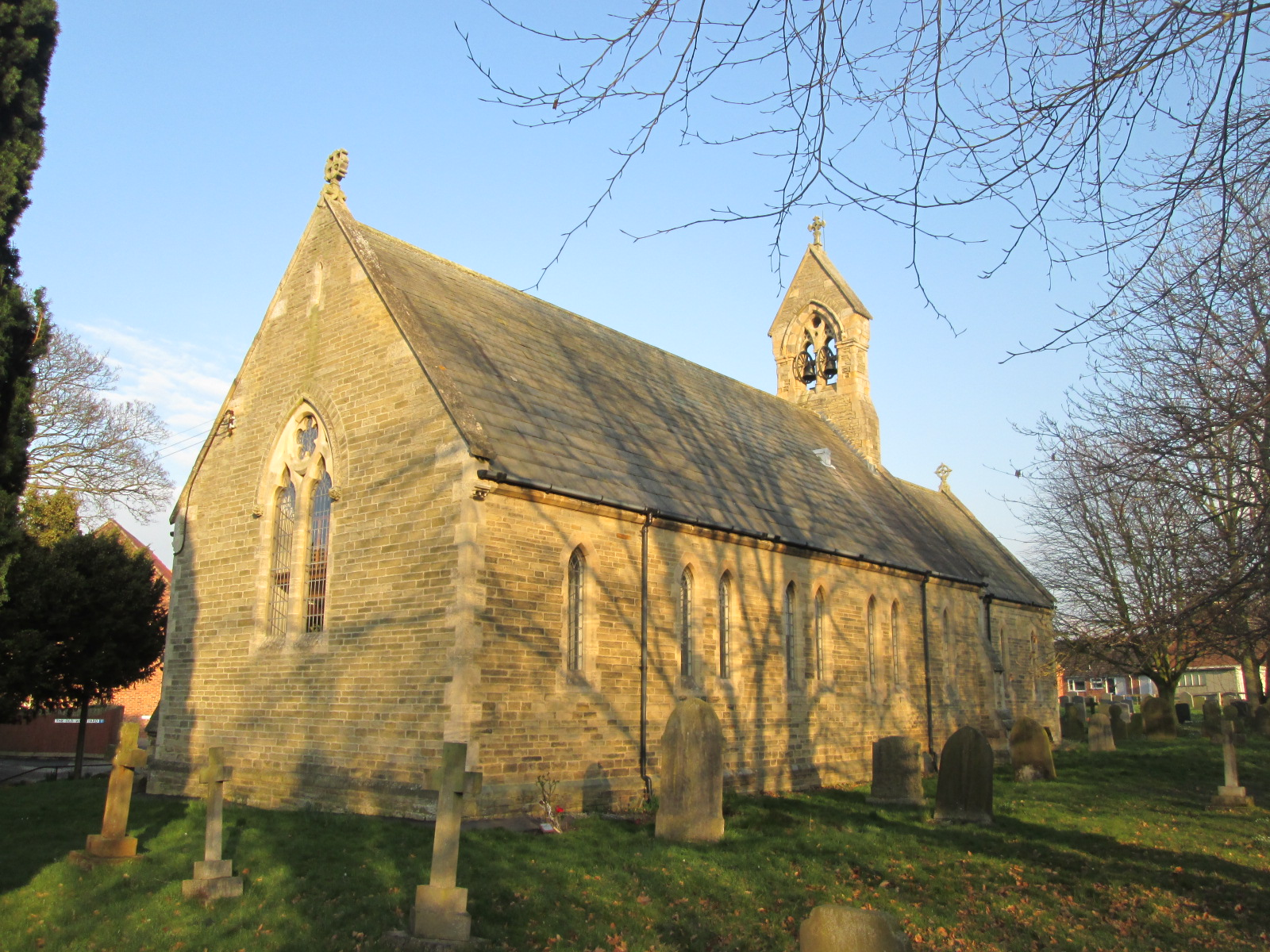
The church, in 2014

St John the Baptist's Church is the parish church of Stamford Bridge, East Riding of Yorkshire, a village in England.

Until the mid 20th century, Stamford Bridge was in the parish of All Saints' Church, Catton. A chapel of ease was built in the village in the Mediaeval period, dedicated to Saint Leonard, and it remained in use until the early 18th century. In 1868, a new church was built in Stamford Bridge, dedicated to Saint John the Baptist. It was designed by George Fowler Jones, and cost £1,500. In 1957, it was made the parish church, with All Saints becoming a chapel of ease.

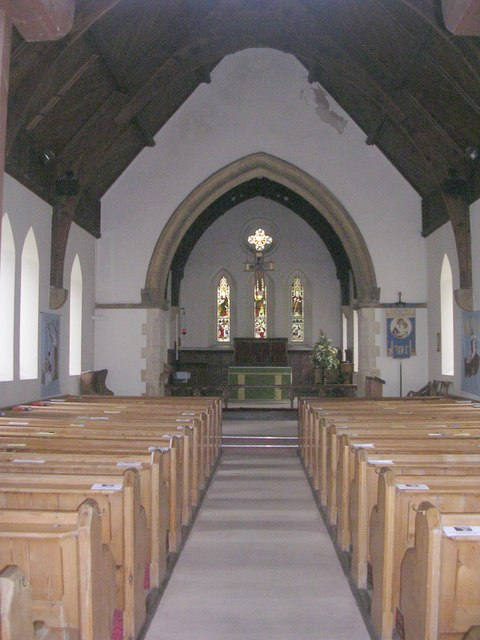
View from the nave into the chancel

The church is built of yellow sandstone, with limestone dressings. It is in the Early English style, and consists of a nave and chancel, with a vestry and porch on the north side, and a bellcote at the east end. Inside, there is a west gallery with an organ. The stained glass in the east window is by Clayton and Bell and was installed in 1892. There is a wooden baptismal font, by a local carpenter.
