= Matt Brash (veterinarian) =

British veterinarian and TV presenter

- Born: Matthew Brash; 1963 (age 62–63); Bonn, Germany
- Education: Royal Veterinary College
- Medical career
- Profession: veterinarian

Matthew Brash (born 1963) is a British veterinarian and television presenter. Brash began his career at the Flamingo Land zoo around 1991. He has been a TV presenter or star in the TV programmes Zoo Vet, Zoo Vet At Large, Vets to the Rescue, and Vets in the Country on BBC and ITV1. He wrote the book Zoo Vet about the situations he encountered as a veterinarian.

== Personal life ==
Brash was born in 1963 in Bonn in Germany. He has three siblings and is the youngest. His parents were diplomats and moved with their family around the world. When he was six years old, Brash lived in Canada and remembers trying to play with an infant brown bear. His family next moved to Vietnam while the Vietnam War was being fought – Brash recalls hearing exploding bombs in the distance. The family was protected by the Gurkhas. While in Vietnam, Brash began studying lizards and insects and became interested in rare animals.

Brash attended The King's School, Canterbury as a boarder while his parents served around the world. He studied at the Royal Veterinary College between 1982 and 1987, and while there met Clare, his future wife. In 1991, he relocated to be closer to her. Clare became an equestrian veterinarian. The couple have four children, Jack, Charlie, Alfie, and "Tiger".

== Career ==
Brash began serving as a veterinarian at the Flamingo Land zoo (North Yorkshire) around 1991. At the zoo, he once spent two days giving vasectomies to 27 baboons and took 10.5 hours to anaesthetise 99 flamingos to allow the zoo to identify each animal's sex. In 1998, he joined the Royal Society for the Prevention of Cruelty to Animals and HM Customs and Excise officials in an operation against a parrot smuggler. The raid, filmed for Undercover Police, was Brash's first television appearance, and it was where he first met Katie Metcalfe, a television producer. As a result of that encounter, Brash came up with the concept for the TV show Zoo Vet At Large. In 1998, he received television coverage of his work at the Flamingo Land zoo, and, after the BBC noticed him, he appeared with the veterinarian Trude Mostue as co-star of the TV programme Vets to the Rescue. In 2002, he starred in the TV programme Vets in the Country which centred on his veterinary clinics near York, and in 2003, he began starring in the ITV1 show Zoo Vet. Brash treated the owls that appeared in the 2001 film Harry Potter and the Philosopher's Stone; when the American owl trainers noticed that the owls were unwell during practices in Newcastle upon Tyne, their Hampshire veterinarian suggested that they seek Brash's help. Brash, who had three days to treat them before filming began, determined that the owls had leukocytozoonosis and treated them.

Brash had a veterinary clinic called Battle Flatts surgery in Pocklington that he started on 8 September 2001. He later opened three more practices in Stamford Bridge, Strensall, and Norton-on-Derwent, and began attending weekly at Flamingo Land zoo, though he saw the small animals from Flamingo Land at Pocklington to allow him to be at his practice more. One of his most serious injuries as a veterinarian was caused when a white rabbit bit his wrist and opened an artery. In 2010, national veterinary chain CVS purchased Brash's four veterinary practices, which had nine veterinarians and 31 additional employees on their staff. After the transaction, Brash departed from the Ark Alliance, his veterinary group that owned the clinics. Between August 2008 and August 2009, the company had £1.8 million (US$2,804,090.95) in revenue and a before-tax profit of £141,000 (US$219,653.79). Brash is a member of the British Veterinary Zoological Society and was vice president of the society in 2014.

Brash authored Zoo Vet for Shaffron Publishing in 2007 about his experiences as a veterinarian. His publisher had asked him to write about 80,000 words and gave him 12 weeks to complete the book, so before going to his regular daily work, Brash would wake up by 4:00 am to write several thousand words while his family was still asleep. He promoted the book at Great Yorkshire Show.

Testifying in Hull Magistrates' Court, Brash in 2010 was a prosecution witness in a case involving three men who were found guilty of violating the Protection of Badgers Act 1992 when they were caught digging up a sett. He testified that he believed the badgers had been living in the sett. In 2015, Brash was a Burgess Pet Care veterinary adviser, and in 2017, he was the resident veterinarian for Co-op Insurance.
