= Stamford Bridge (bridge) =

Grade II* listed bridge in the East Riding of Yorkshire, England

Coordinates: 53.991°N 0.916°W

Stamford Bridge (Replacement and Tolls) Act 1724
- Act of Parliament
- Parliament of Great Britain
- Long title: An Act to enable the Justices of the Peace for the East Riding of the County of York to take down the County Bridge, called Stanford Bridge; and to build a Stone Bridge, at a more convenient Place, over the River Darwent, in the said Riding, instead thereof.
- Citation: 11 Geo. 1. c. 10
- Territorial extent: Great Britain

Dates
- Royal assent: 24 March 1725
- Commencement: 31 May 1725 (Note: Start of session.)
- Repealed: 23 May 1950
Other legislation
| Repealed by | Statute Law Revision Act 1950 |

Status: Repealed

Text of statute as originally enacted

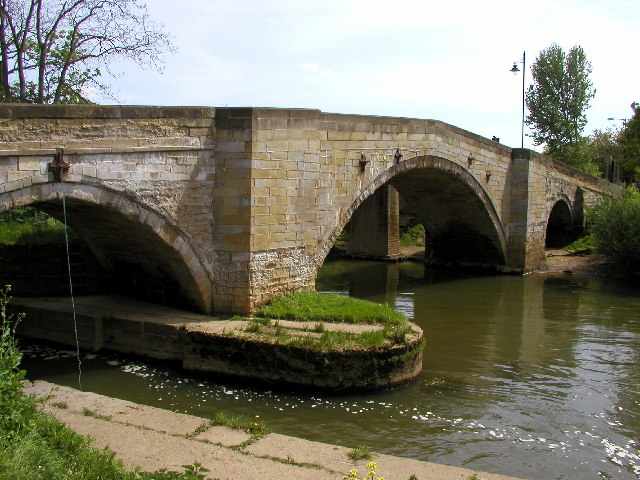
The bridge, in 2005

Stamford Bridge is a historic bridge, in the village of Stamford Bridge, in the East Riding of Yorkshire in England.

In the Roman period, the River Derwent could be crossed near the fort of Derventio by a ford. The first bridge in the area is believed to have been built during the existence of the Kingdom of Northumbria, a narrow, timber structure, which may have been on the site of the ford, or about 160 yards (150 m) downstream. The next record of a bridge is in 1280, on the downstream site, and this is probably the same structure described in 1581 as having stone piers supporting a timber bridge.

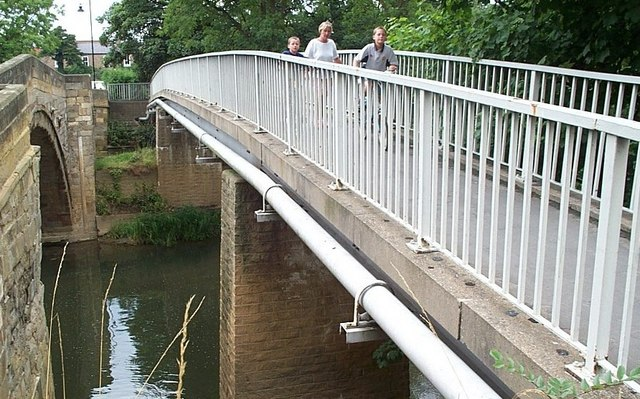
The adjacent footbridge

In 1727, a new bridge was constructed, a further 160 yards (150 m) downstream, where the river is narrower but deeper. It was designed by William Etty. It is built of stone, with three arches: a wider central arch, and narrower north and south arches which are usually dry. There are narrow refuges, formerly for pedestrians, and a stone parapet.

In 1765, the road became a turnpike, and it was tolled until 1812. Its southern span was widened in the 19th century. It has been grade II* listed since 1952, and was formerly also a scheduled monument. The bridge now carries the A166 road, from York to Bridlington. In 1967, a steel footbridge was constructed alongside the road bridge.

The bridge was damaged after a number of traffic strikes and was closed for a number of weeks in 2024 to undergo repairs to the stone parapets. Traffic bollards were also installed to prevent further collisions.

== See also ==
- Grade II* listed buildings in the East Riding of Yorkshire
- Listed buildings in Stamford Bridge, East Riding of Yorkshire
