= Burnby Hall Gardens =

Gardens in the East Riding of Yorkshire, England

Coordinates: 53.927855°N 0.776083°W

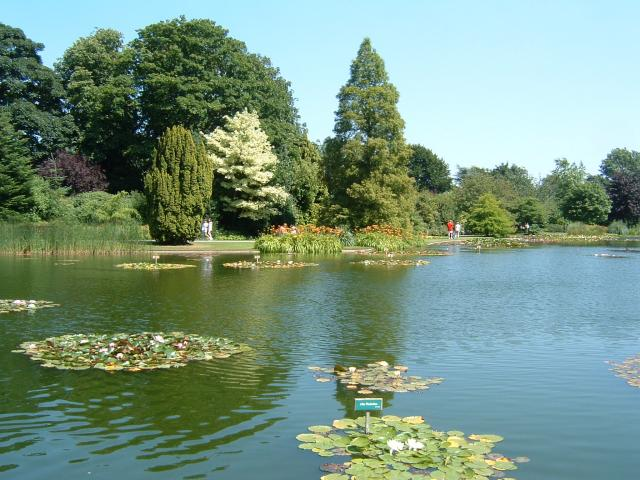
Lily ponds, Burnby Hall Gardens, Pocklington

Burnby Hall Gardens, also known as Stewart's Burnby Hall Gardens and Museum, are located close to the centre of Pocklington, East Riding of Yorkshire, England. They are home to the United Kingdom's national collection of hardy water lilies, and contain the largest such collection to be found in a natural setting in Europe. The 8 acres (3.2 ha) of gardens with two lakes planted with naturalized water lilies were bequeathed to Pocklington by Major Percy Marlborough Stewart.

The lakes, originally created for fishing, are stocked with ornamental roach and carp that visitors can hand feed.

In 2024, Burnby Hall Gardens was awarded the prestigious Gold Award from Yorkshire in Bloom.

== Stewart Museum ==
The estate's house contains the Stewart Museum, which features the personal collections of Major Percy Marlborough Stewart (1871–1962). The collections include sporting trophies of animal heads and artefacts from Stewart's travels around the world.
