= Easton Gardens =

Garden in Dorset, England

Coordinates: 50.5453°N 2.4364°W

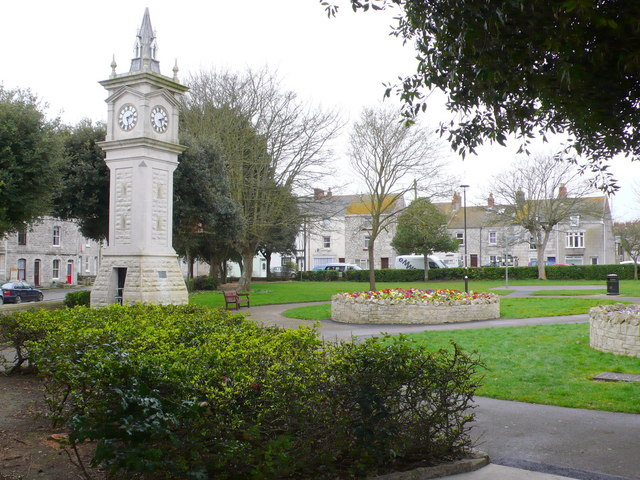
Easton Gardens, including the Clock Tower.

Easton Gardens is a public garden, located at Tophill, Isle of Portland, Dorset, England. It is found at Easton Square, the centre of Easton village. The gardens have remained a focal point since their opening in 1904 and have been awarded the Green Flag Award in recent years. The gardens feature grassed and formal bedding areas, with other facilities including a children's play area and basketball court.

== Background ==
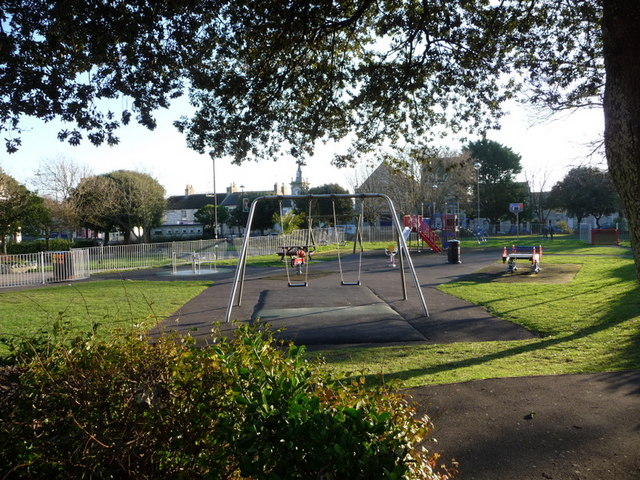
Easton Gardens' play area.

The idea of transforming an area of Tophill into a public garden was first suggested in 1896, along with the transformation of another Portland site, Little Common, into Victoria Gardens. Easton Square was later chosen as Tophill's site in 1901 and plans, created by engineer Mr R. S. Henshaw, were approved in August 1903. That year saw work commence on their creation, with Messrs Stewart & Sons tasked with laying out lawns, flower beds and footpaths, along with a bandstand.

The gardens were opened by Mr Henry Sansom, Chairman of the Portland Urban District Council, on 18 August 1904, in front of large audience. The day was noted for its sunshine. In 2004, locals donned costumes of the 1900s to celebrate the garden's 100th anniversary. In recent years, Easton Gardens has been awarded Green Flag status.

In 1905, Sansom suggested the erecting of a clock tower within the gardens. Designed by R. Stevenson Henshaw, the clock was built by Wakeham Brothers and unveiled during a ceremony in May 1907. As a prominent feature in the square ever since, the clock tower became Grade II Listed in 1993. English Heritage's survey noted that the clock is a Jacobethan-styled structure with Gothic details.
