= Stamford Bridge, East Riding of Yorkshire =

Village and civil parish in the East Riding of Yorkshire, England

Coordinates: 53°59′24″N 0°54′42″W

Stamford Bridge
- Village and civil parish
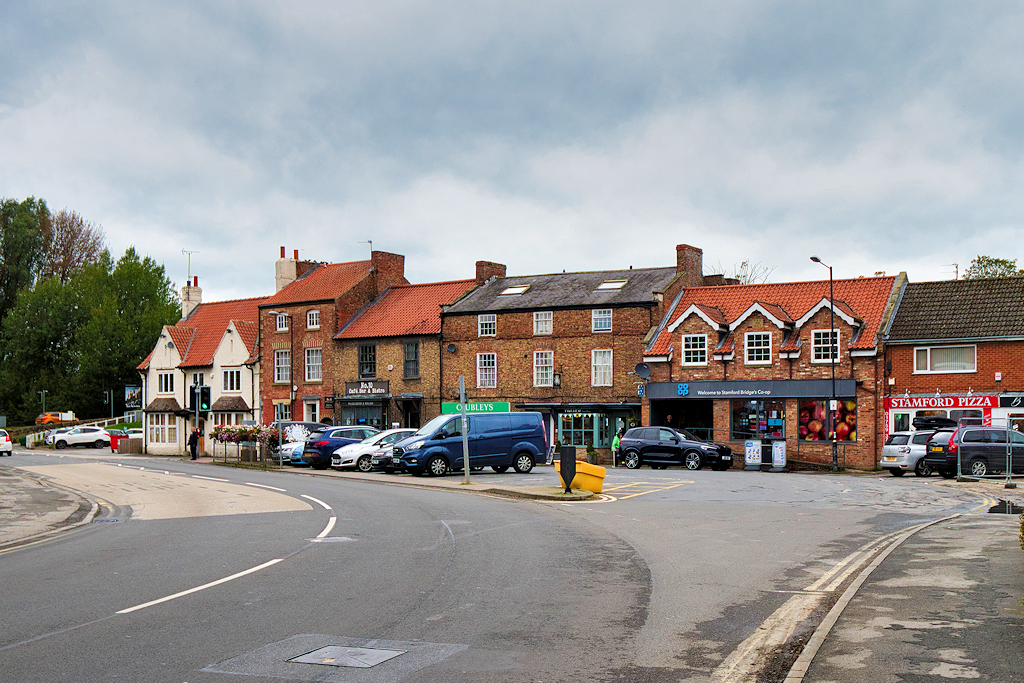
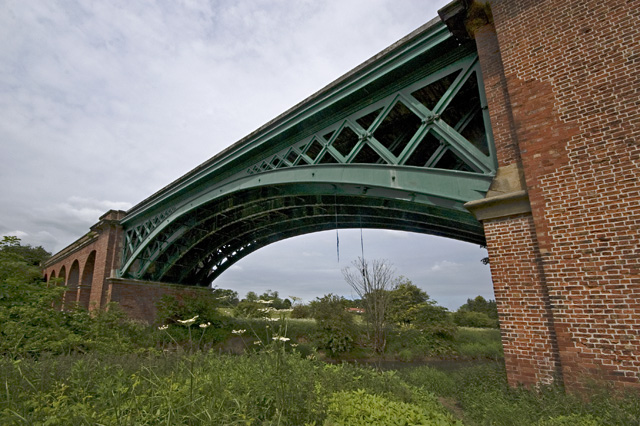
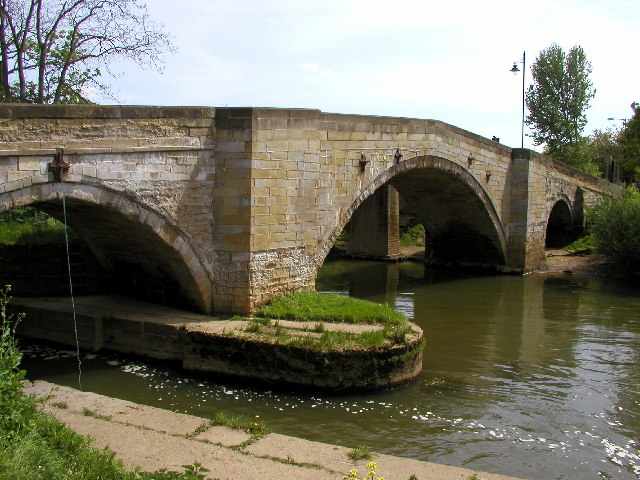
- The Square Stamford Bridge Viaduct The road bridge

- Location within the East Riding of Yorkshire
- Interactive map showing the parish boundary
- Population: 4,490 (built-up area, 2021)
- OS grid reference: SE713556
- Civil parish: Stamford Bridge
- Unitary authority: East Riding of Yorkshire
- Ceremonial county: East Riding of Yorkshire
- Region: Yorkshire and the Humber
- Country: England
- Sovereign state: United Kingdom
- Post town: York
- Postcode district: YO41
- Dialling code: 01759
- Police: Humberside
- Fire: Humberside
- Ambulance: Yorkshire
- UK Parliament: Goole and Pocklington

Stamford Bridge is a village and civil parish on the River Derwent in the East Riding of Yorkshire, England, approximately 5 miles (8 km) east of York and 22 miles (35 km) west of Driffield. The village sits astride an ancient ford on the River Derwent.

Stamford Bridge is known for the Roman fort Derventio, the Battle of Stamford Bridge (1066 AD), Stamford Bridge railway station and Stamford Bridge Viaduct on the disused York–Beverley railway, and the Stamford Bridge road crossing of the River Derwent.

== Governance ==
The village lies on the borders with the North Yorkshire and the City of York unitary authorities. The parish has a parish council, known as Stamford Bridge Parish Council. It is also within the boundaries of the Pocklington Provincial ward of East Riding of Yorkshire Council, which elects three councillors every four years.

== Demographics ==
The population has increased in recent years due to substantial new housing developments, particularly on the south side of the town.

At the 2021 census, the civil parish had a population of 3,998 people in 1,729 households. This figure excludes new housing built on the northern periphery of the town in Skirpenbeck parish; in 2023, the parish boundary was adjusted to transfer this development into Stamford Bridge parish.

The Office for National Statistics also define a Stamford Bridge built-up area, which excludes rural parts of the parish, but does include the new developments outside the pre-2023 parish boundary, and which had a pop 4,490 in 2021.

Census population of Stamford Bridge parish
Census	Population	Female	Male	Households	Source
2001	3,394	1,788	1,606	1,397	
2011	3,528	1,861	1,667	1,492	
2021	3,998	2,142	1,856	1,729	

== History ==
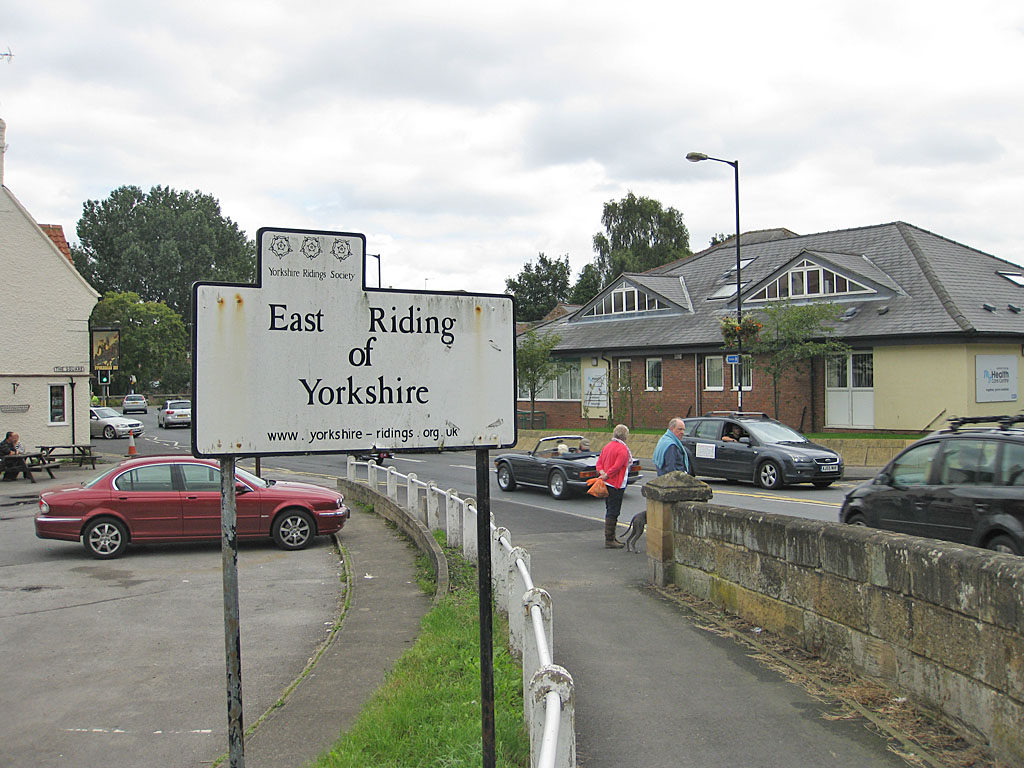
Crossing the Bridge from North to East Yorkshire

=== Roman fort Derventio ===
The Romans established a fort here about 70 AD, around which later developed a large linear civilian settlement focused on a bridge one mile (1.6 km) south of the present town.

Iter I of the Antonine Itinerary lists "Derventio" as being seven Roman miles from Eboracum (York) which matches the distance from York. In relation to known discoveries under the town of Malton, antiquaries always assumed that Malton should be called Derventio. The remains at Stamford Bridge were not known to them, lying undiscovered under arable and pasture fields until quite recently.

The name Derventio is of Celtic origin (dervo- "oak-tree") and relates to the River Derwent. The fort had access to the Roman road network of Roman Britain via the Roman road known as Cade's Road (Margary road 80a).

=== Viking Age ===
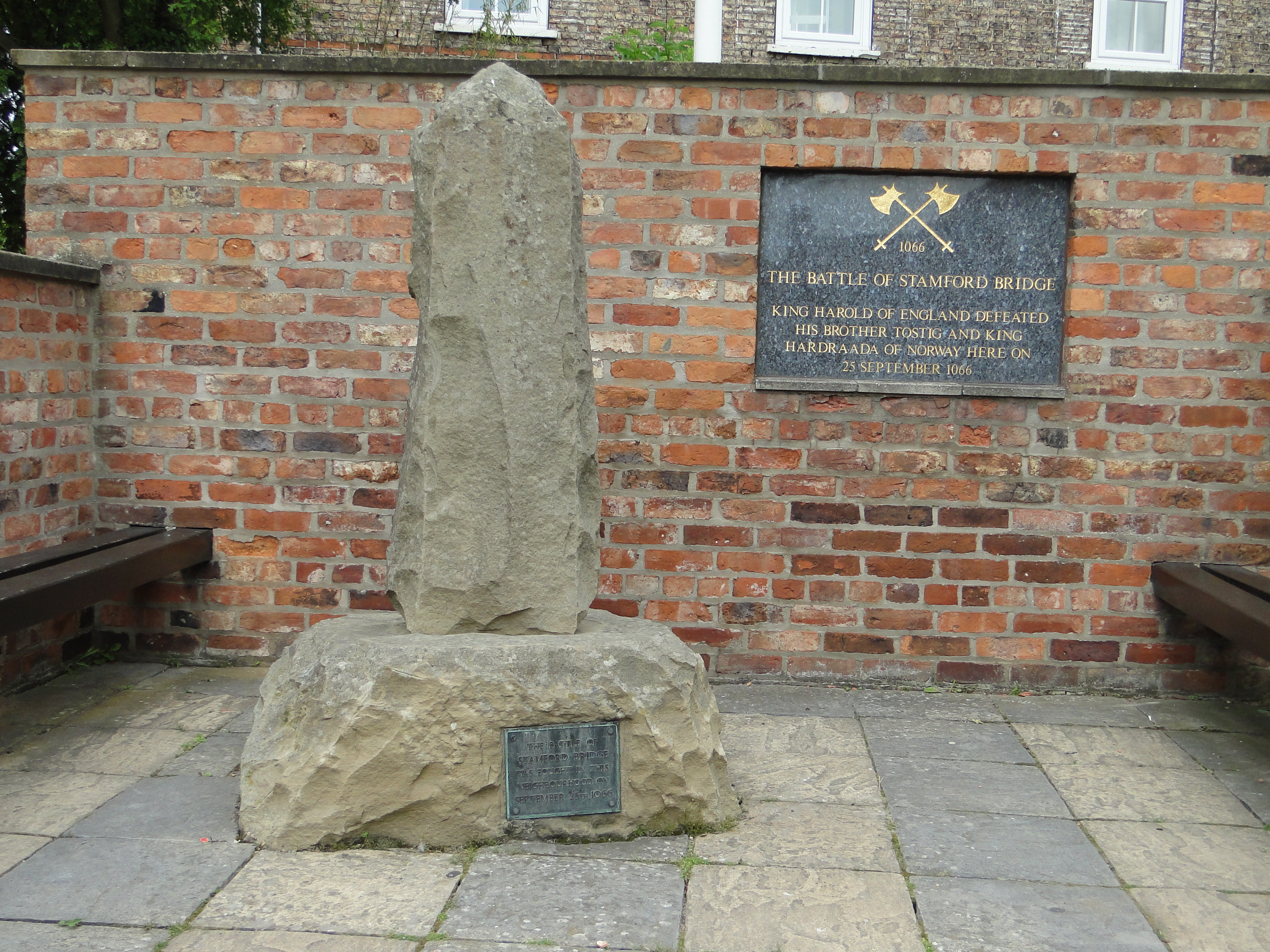
The Battle of Stamford Bridge 1066 memorial

The Battle of Stamford Bridge on 25 September 1066 is often regarded as the traditional end of the Viking Age in England. At Stamford Bridge, King Harold II repelled the invading Norwegian force led by his brother Tostig Godwinson and King Harald Hardrada of Norway, but, three weeks later, his loss at the Battle of Hastings allowed the Norman Conquest of England.

The settlement was called Pons Belli by the Normans, meaning battle bridge. Rents of freeholders and cottagers were recorded in 1368 and there was a common oven recorded the same year.

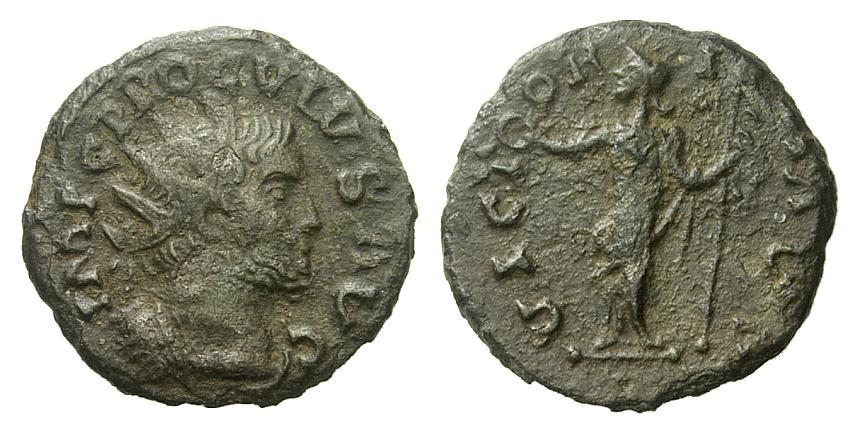
A coin from the Roman times of Emperor Proculus was recovered in Stamford Bridge in 2012

=== Recent history ===
The A166 east–west road crossing the river at Stamford Bridge is one of the main roads from York to the East Riding and the coast. The road bridge in the village was closed on 5 March 2007, for just over 11 weeks, so that essential repairs could be carried out, in light of the enormous volume of traffic that uses it, exceptional for such an old bridge (dating from 1727). The bridge reopened on 22 May.

The village suffered from record floods in November 2000 which seriously flooded 30 businesses and homes. Flood defences have now been installed, costing £3.7 million.

The 80m-long bridge, built in 1727, over the River Derwent has been struck in several traffic accidents in recent years, causing severe damage to its stone parapets. In 2024, the East Riding of Yorkshire Council invested £350,000 in repairing the Grade II listed bridge and improving road safety, following years of damage caused by vehicles.

== Natural history ==
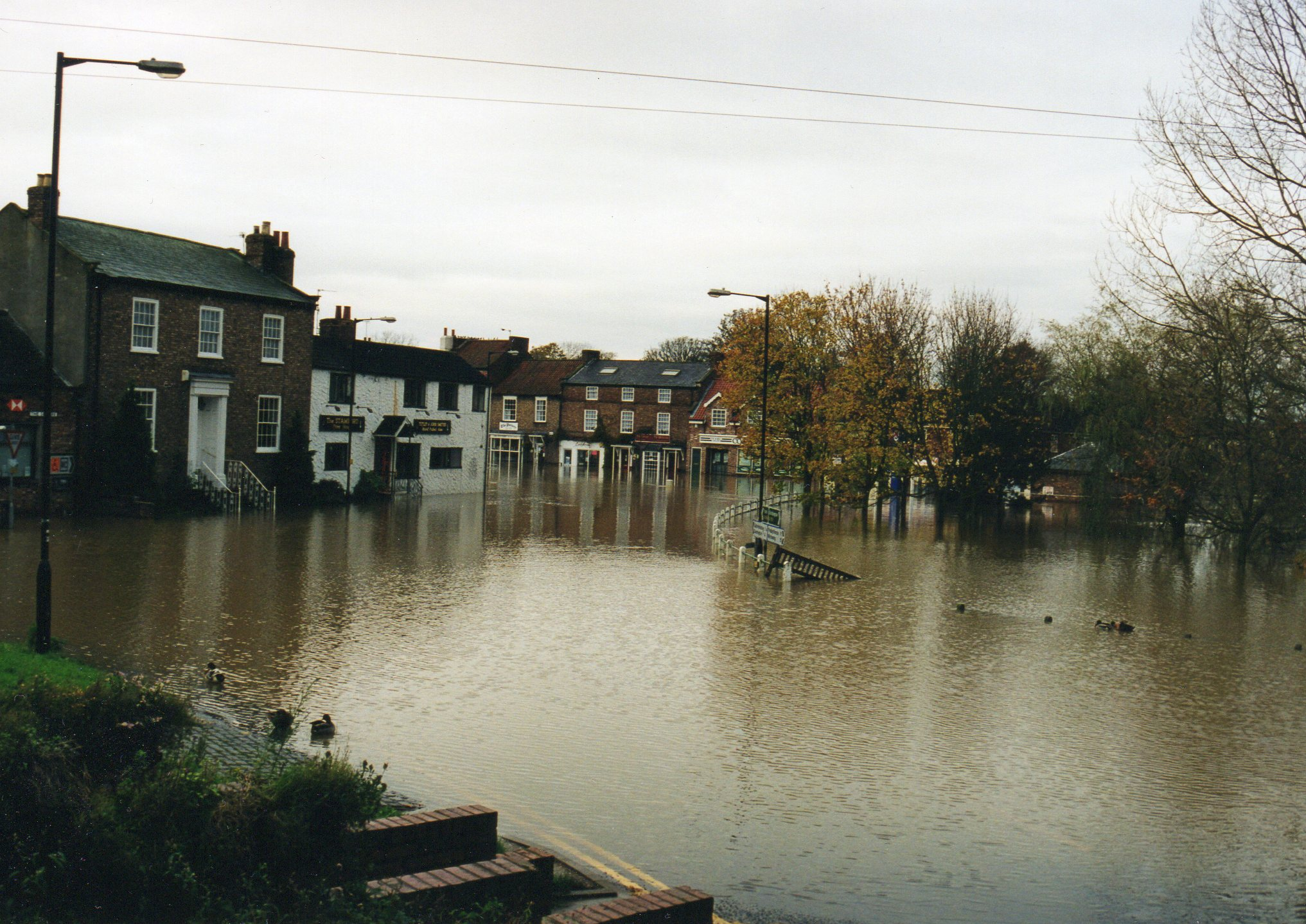
Village flood in October 2000

The River Derwent divides Stamford Bridge into two. During 4/5 March 1999, exceptional levels of rainfall were experienced in the Derwent catchment area, reaching 125 millimetres (4.9 in) in 24‑hours, worsened by melting snow which had earlier accumulated on the North York Moors. By Sunday 7 March large areas of Stamford Bridge were under water and a final flooding depth of approximately 1.5 metres (4.9 ft) was recorded by Monday 8 March. At the height of the flooding the River Derwent reach the peak of 5m above its normal level, the highest level ever recorded exceeding the previous highest in 1931 by 0.5 metres (20 in).

The following year a new record flood level was set. In October 2000 the Derwent again burst its banks and peaked slightly above the 1999 flood level.

In 2003–04, new flood defences were built. The flood defences were breached, and much of the village square was under water, on the morning of 26 June 2007.

== Landmarks ==
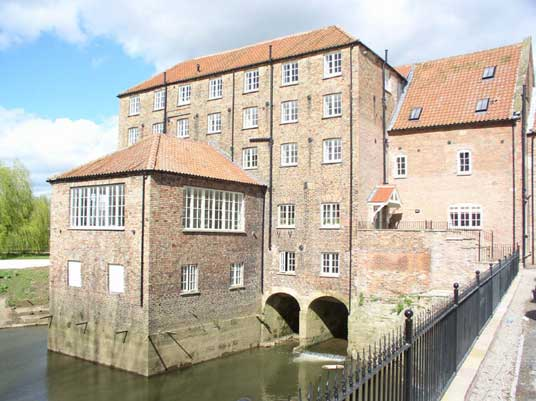
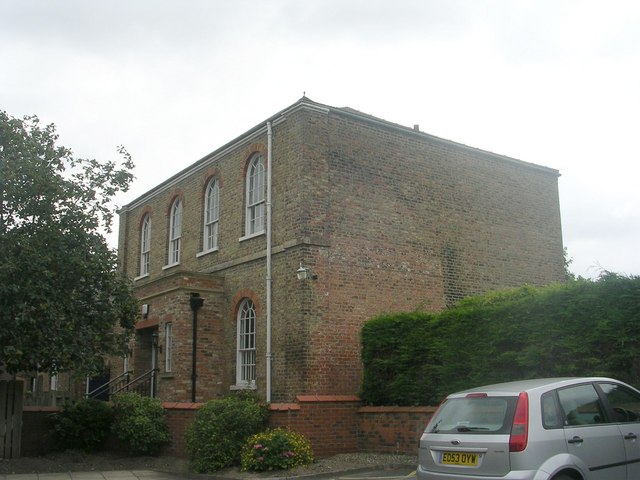
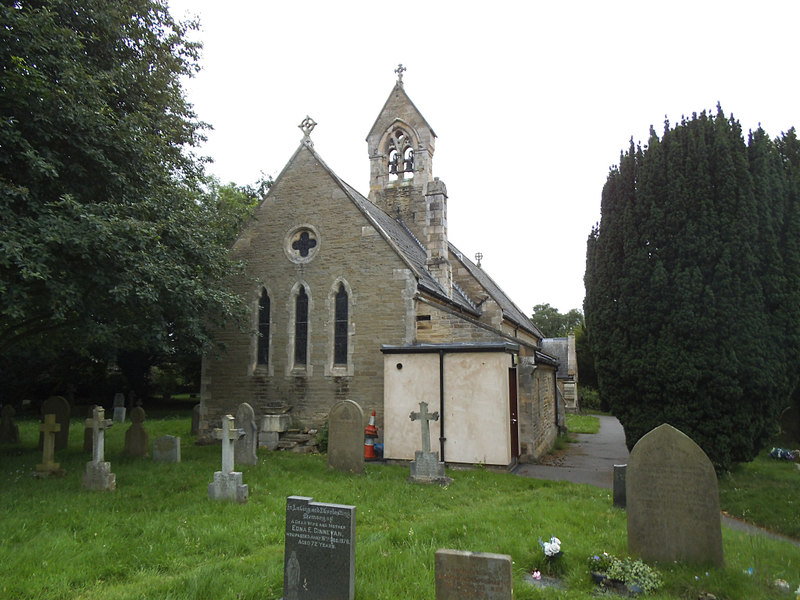
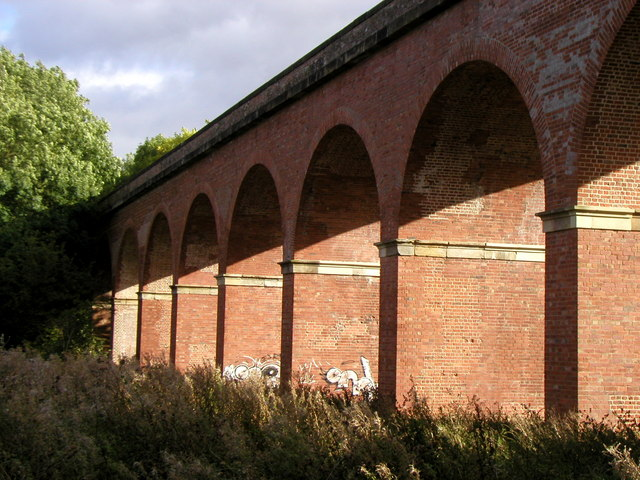
The Old Cornmill, Wesleyan Chapel, St John's Church and the Viaduct

Stamford Bridge has several notable landmarks, including the Corn Mill; the stone arched bridge over the River Derwent; the Stamford Bridge Viaduct, and Stamford Bridge railway station, both c. 1847; a Wesleyan Methodist Chapel, built 1828 in yellow brick; the Bay Horse Inn, late 18th to early 19th century public house; as well as "Derwent Plastics factory", on the west side of the river, established in 1934 from a former brewery building. St John the Baptist's Church, Stamford Bridge is the Anglican parish church.

Just east of Stamford Bridge is the manor house Burtonfields Hall, built in 1837 by the architect Anthony Salvin for Charles Darley. Darley was married to Salvin's sister-in-law Marianne Nesfield, and their daughter married Anthony Salvin Junior. The original house was extended by W. H. Brierley in about 1898.

A memorial commemorating the Battle of Stamford Bridge overlooking the field where the battle is thought to have taken place is on Whiterose Drive.

The Cornmill is a late 18th to early 19th century Grade II listed water mill. The current mill was possibly expanded in 1847–50 when nearly £1,000 was spent on it. Subsequently, there were two water wheels and seven pairs of grinding stones. The mill ceased operation in 1964 and was converted into a restaurant in 1967. More recently the Cornmill was converted into twelve two-bedroom flats but some original equipment remains.

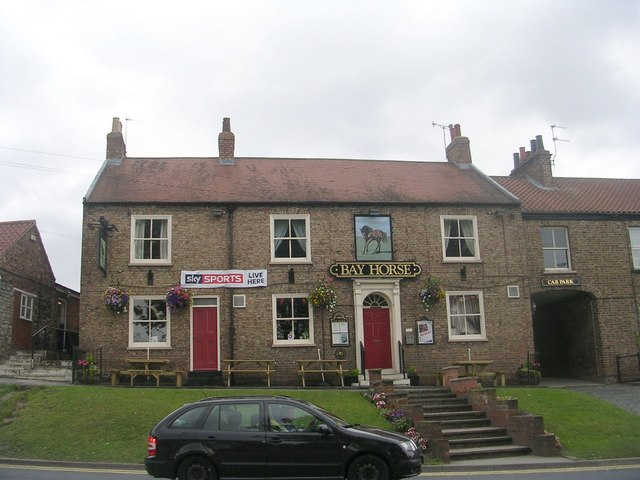
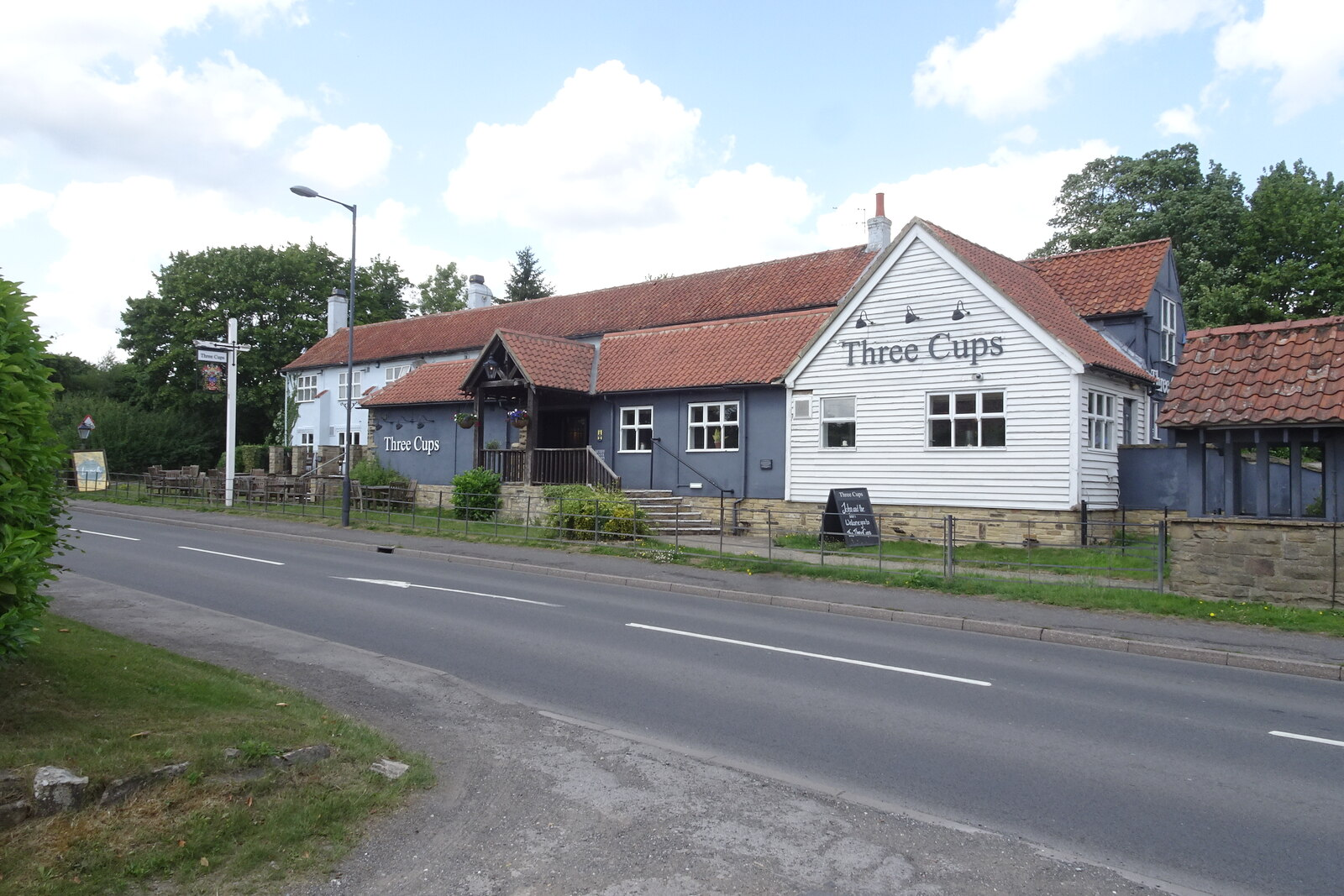
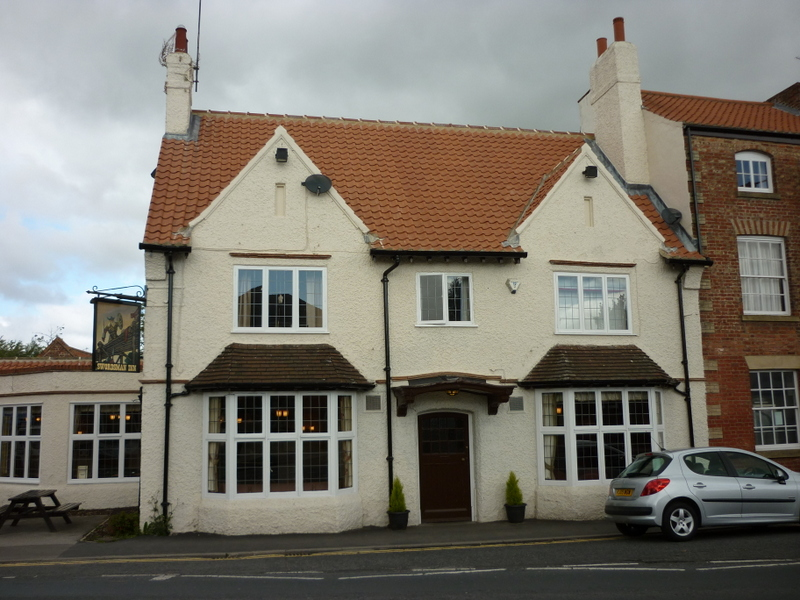
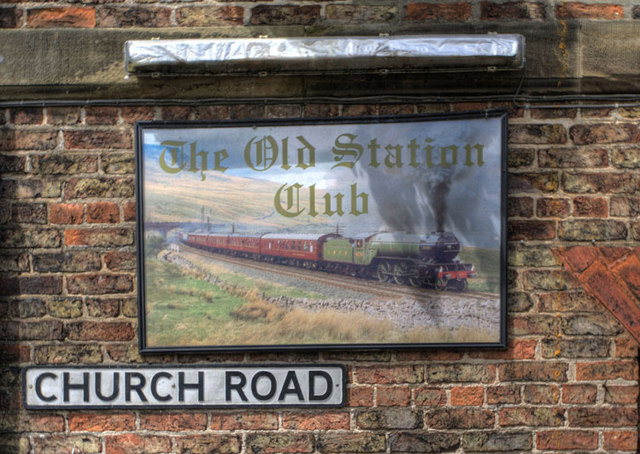
The Pubs, The Bay Horse, The Three Cups, The New Inn and The Old Station Club

The present Stamford Bridge was designed by William Etty under the Stamford Bridge (Replacement and Tolls) Act 1724 and completed in 1727. The bridge was strengthened in the 1960s and at the same time the adjacent pedestrian bridge was erected. It replaced a medieval bridge made of timber supported on three stone piers, which stood upstream of the current bridge.

The bridge is a Grade II* listed monument.

Opened on 3 October 1847, Stamford Bridge Viaduct originally carried the York to Beverley railway line across the Derwent, closed 1965. It consists of red brick arches on either side of a single wider wrought-iron span that crosses the river. The viaduct now forms part of a public cycle route, and is Grade II* listed.

== Education ==
The village school was first built in Main Street in 1795 as a result of a legacy left by Christopher Wharton. Education was provided free for 12 poor boys and 6 poor girls who had to provide one shilling a year for kindling. Pay scholars were also taught and by 1822 the school population numbered 30. 1874 saw compulsory education and in 1911 the East Riding County Council took over and built a school on the present Church Road site.

This original building was modernised and extended in 1968 and because of the rapid development of the village a further extension was added in 1978. In April 1983 a new infants building, in Godwinsway, Stamford Bridge, was added to the school. Built for 120 infant children it makes the school a split site establishment, but adds greatly to the educational provision for the children. In 2000 this building was also extended.

== Transport ==
The village is served by two bus routes. The number 10 route is operated by First York (and York Pullman in the evenings) with a regular service via Dunnington to the centre of York and then Poppleton. East Yorkshire Motor Services operate an occasional service (No 747) between York and Stamford Bridge continuing to Full Sutton, Fangfoss and Pocklington. Information as at October 2011.

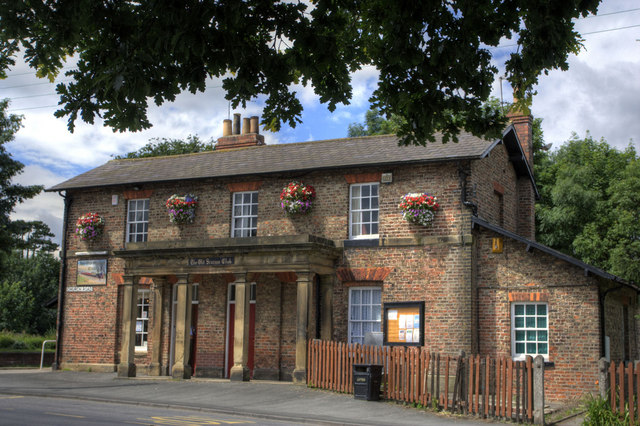
Stamford Bridge railway station site, now used as a Social Club

Stamford Bridge railway station closed in 1965 as part of the Beeching cuts. The Minsters Rail Campaign is campaigning to re-open the railway line between Beverley and York (with stops at Stamford Bridge, Pocklington and Market Weighton). The proposed re-opened railway would skirt the eastern edge of the village as the former alignment has since been developed.

== Notable residents ==
- Previous home of former England national football team goalkeeper Paul Robinson.
- Birthplace of former Manchester United F.C. goalkeeper Nick Culkin.
- Veterinary home of television vet Matt Brash with his newly opened surgery next to the bridge.
