= Pocklington =

Town and civil parish in the East Riding of Yorkshire, England

Coordinates: 53.9309°N 0.7781°W

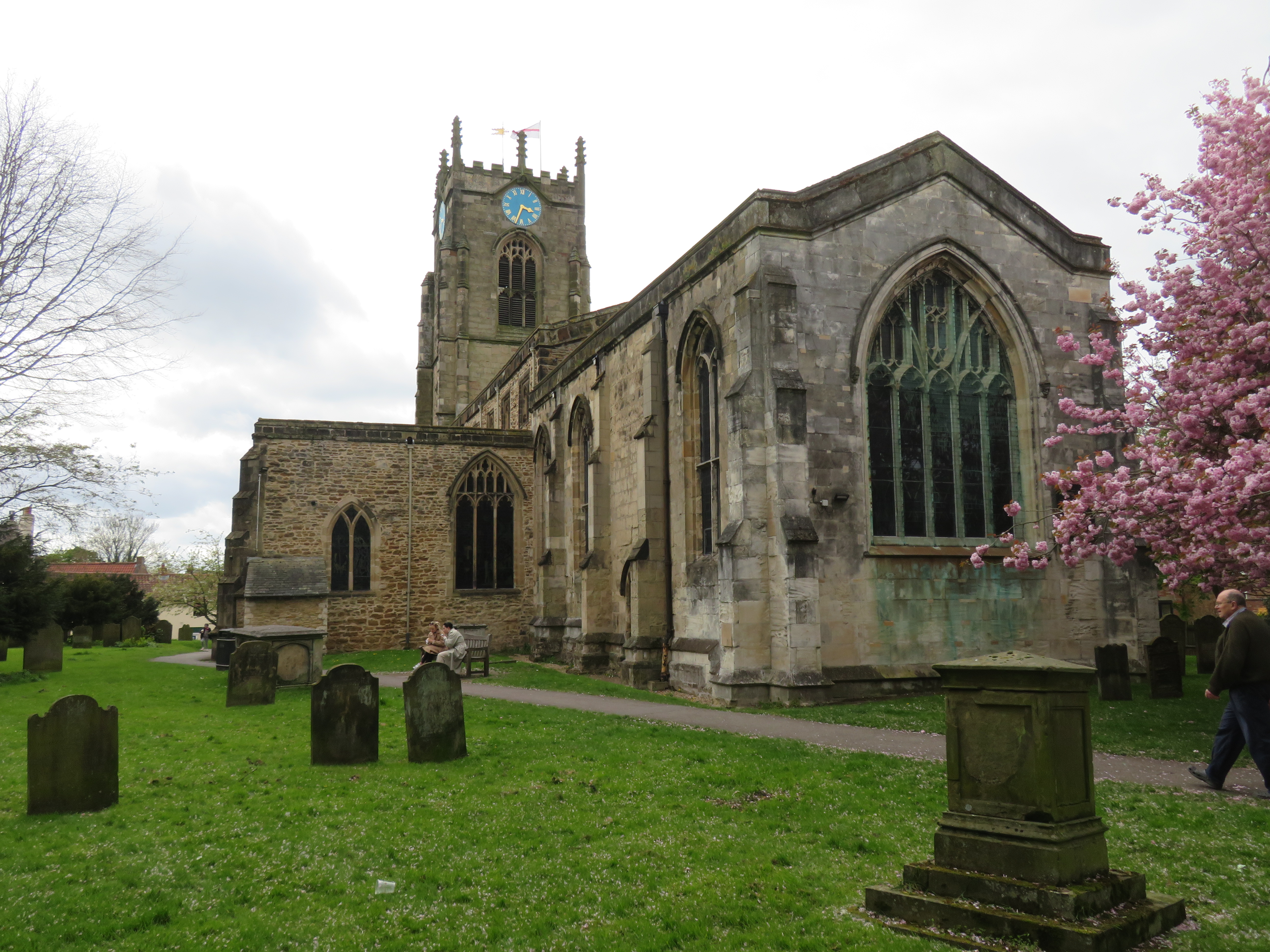
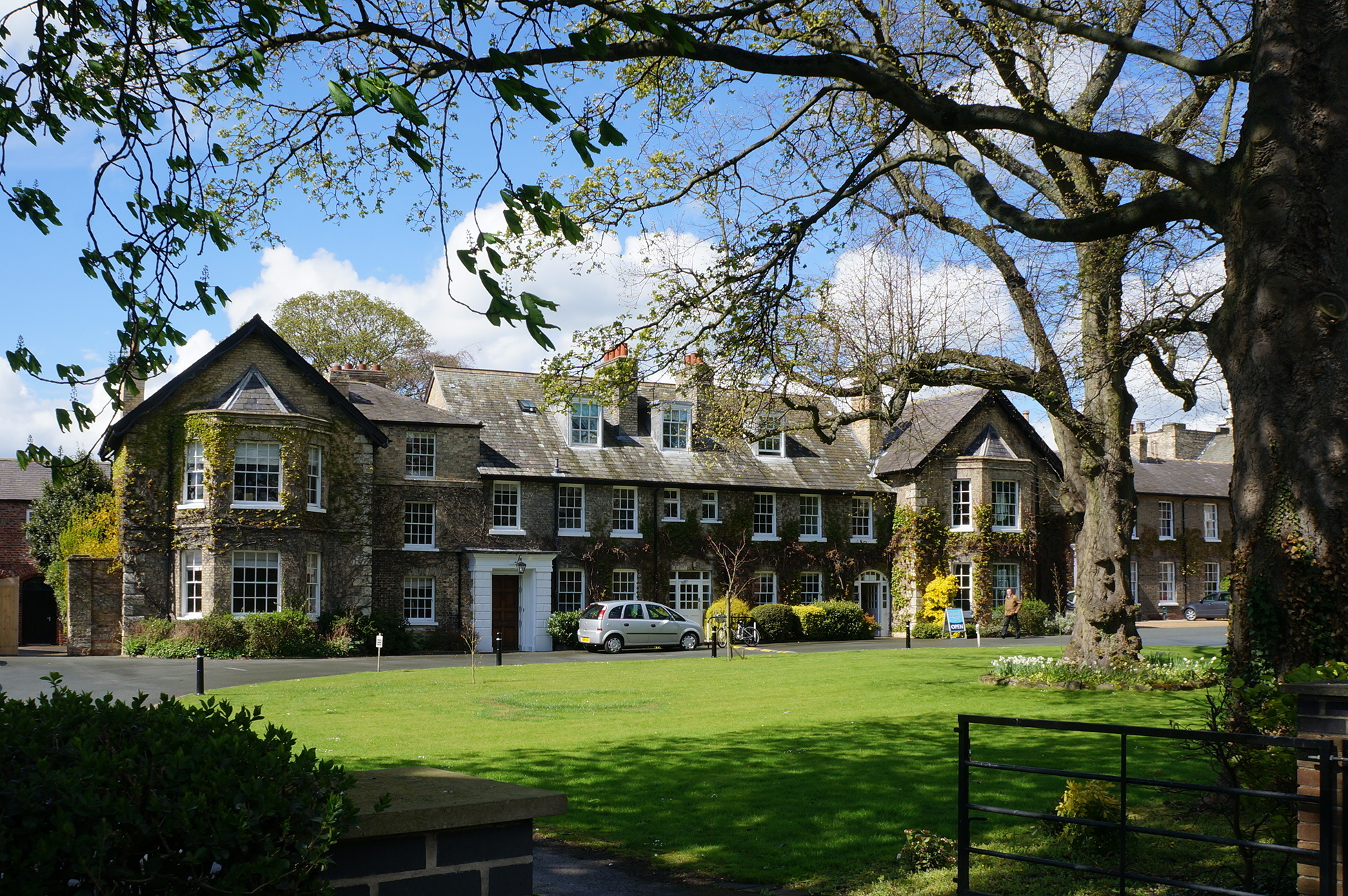
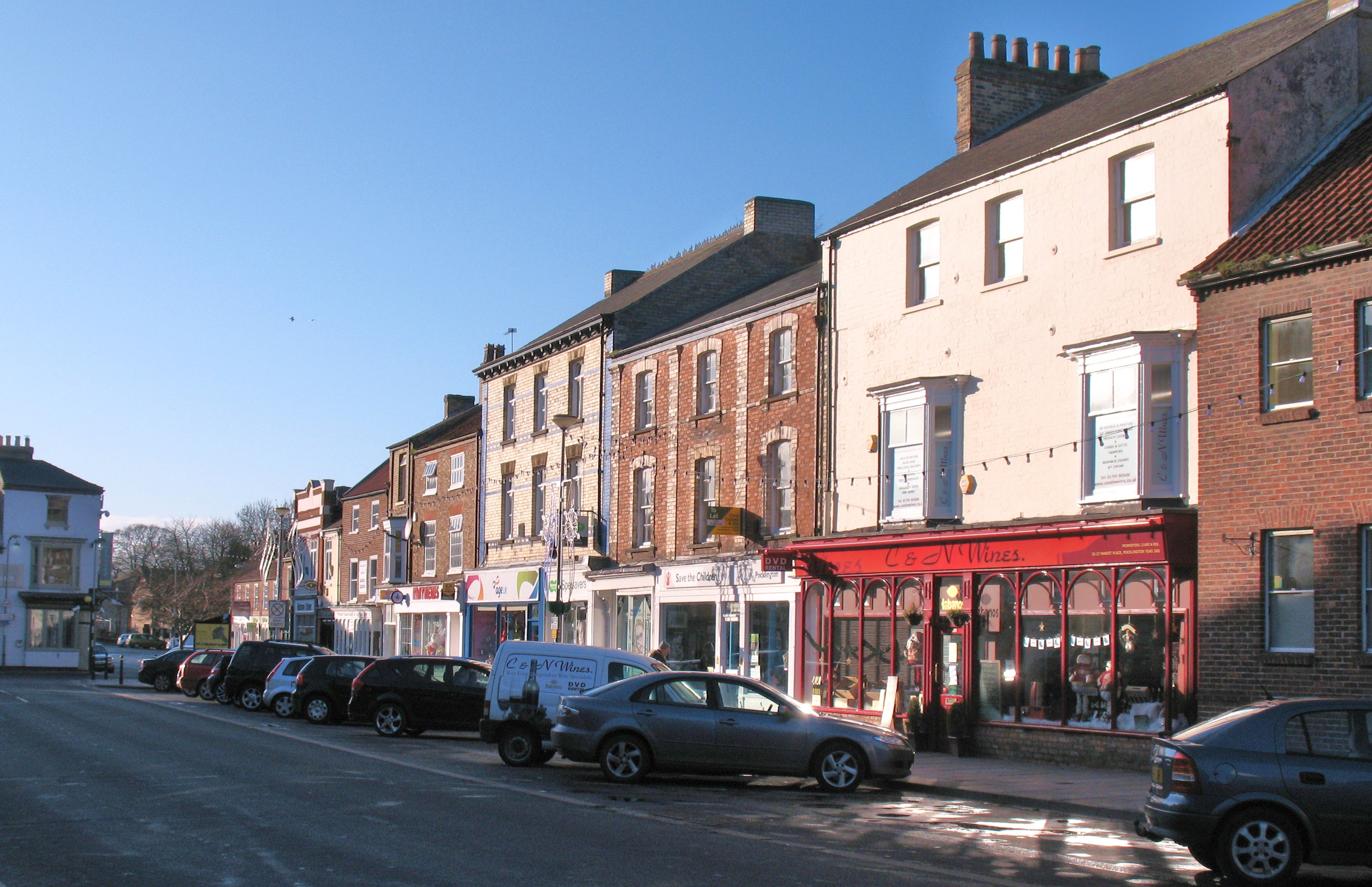
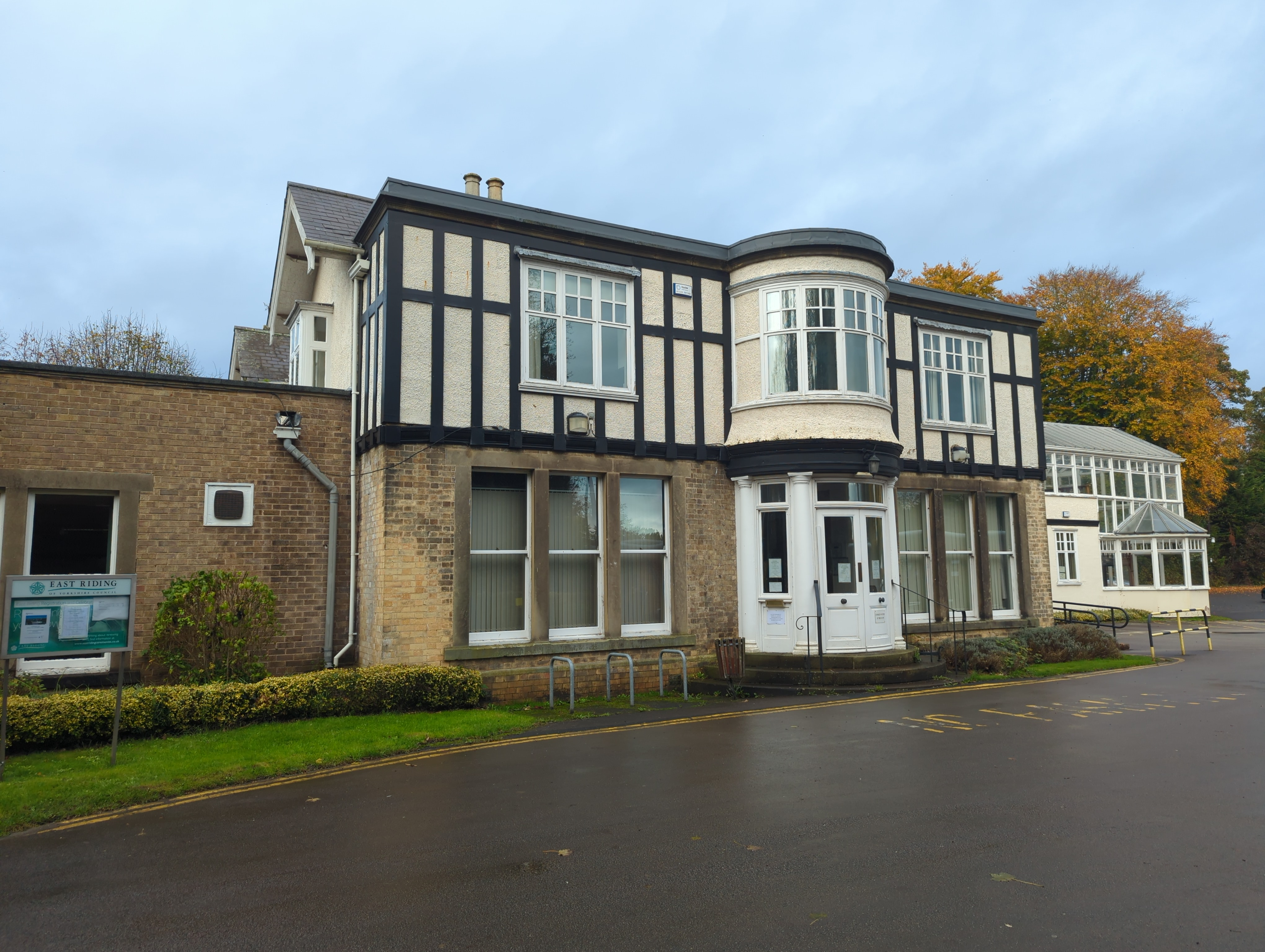
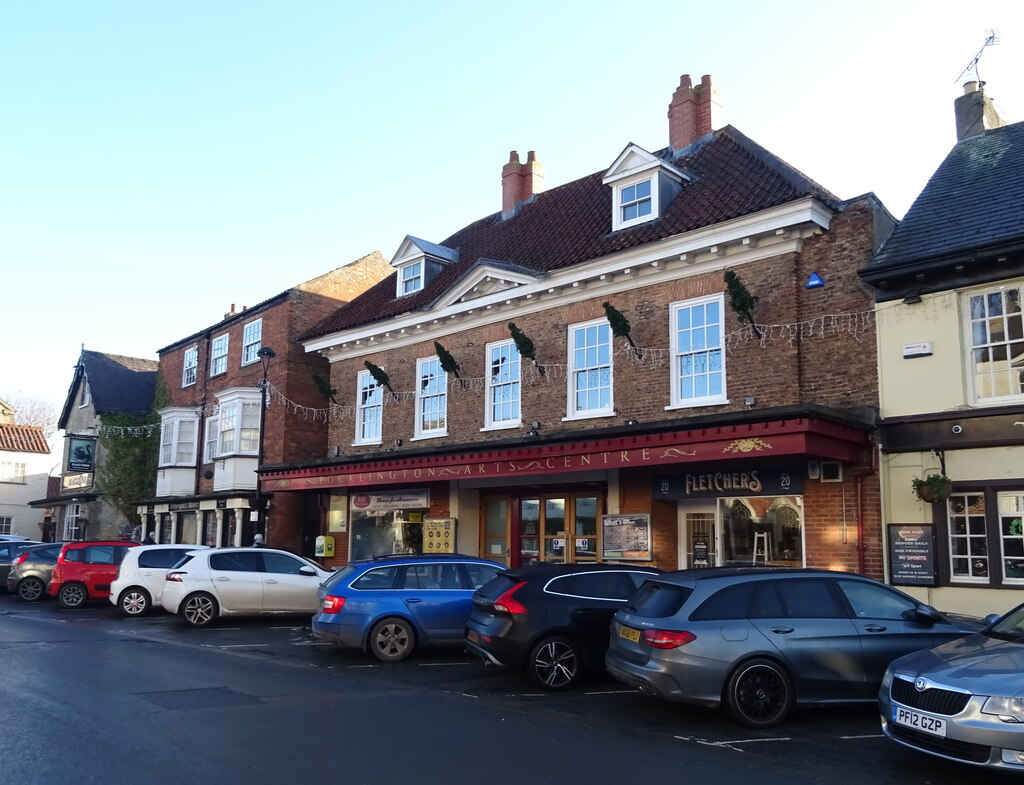
- All Saints Church Pocklington School Market Place Burnby Hall The Arts Centre

- Coat of arms

- Location within the East Riding of Yorkshire
- Population: 10,123 (2021 United Kingdom census)
- OS grid reference: SE802486
- Civil parish: Pocklington
- Unitary authority: East Riding of Yorkshire
- Ceremonial county: East Riding of Yorkshire
- Region: Yorkshire and the Humber
- Country: England
- Sovereign state: United Kingdom
- Post town: YORK
- Postcode district: YO42
- Dialling code: 01759
- Police: Humberside
- Fire: Humberside
- Ambulance: Yorkshire
- UK Parliament: Goole and Pocklington
- Website: Pocklington Town Council

Pocklington (/ˈpɒklɪŋtən/) is a market town and civil parish at the foot of the Yorkshire Wolds in the East Riding of Yorkshire, England. At the 2021 United Kingdom census, its population was 10,123. It lies 13 miles (21 km) east of York, and 22 miles (35 km) north-west of Hull.

The town's skyline is marked by the 15th-century tower of All Saints' parish church. The ecclesiastical parish includes the hamlet of Kilnwick Percy.

== History ==
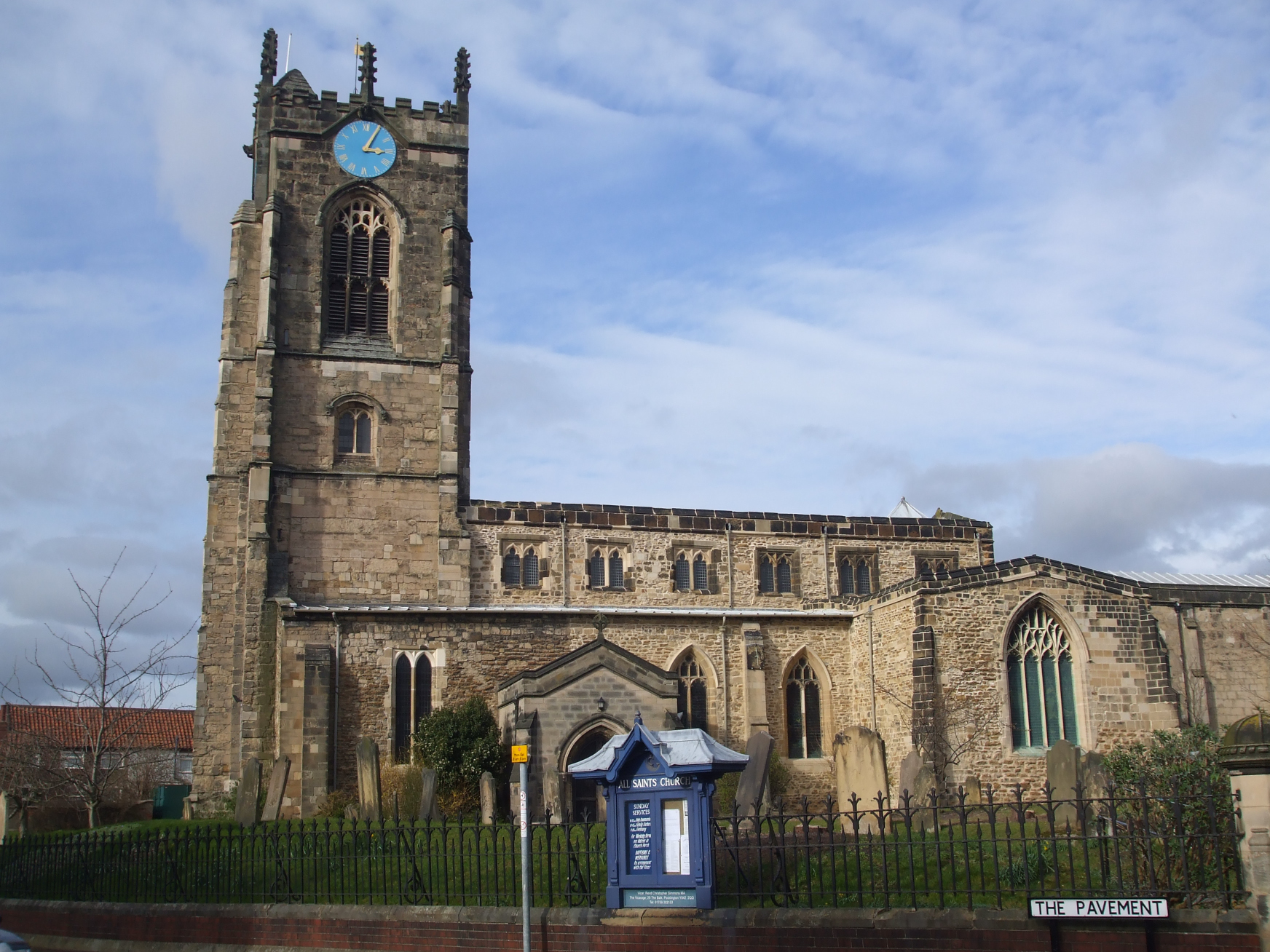
All Saints' Church, Pocklington

Pocklington gets its name via the Old English "Poclintun" from the Anglian settlement of Pocel's (or Pocela's) people and the Old English word "tun" meaning farm or settlement, but though the town's name can only be traced back to around 650 AD, the inhabitation of Pocklington as a site is thought to extend back a further 1,000 years or more to the Bronze Age. Pocklington appears on the 14th-century Gough Map, the oldest route map in Great Britain.

In the Iron Age Pocklington was a major town of the Parisi tribe. In 2017, a Celtic warrior's grave, dated to about BC 320 to 174, was discovered at a housing development under construction. After archeologists had completed a very long excavation project, the site was found to include a bronze shield, remains of a chariot and the skeletons of ponies. The shield's boss bears a resemblance to the Wandsworth shield boss (circa BC 350 to 150), in the British Museum. One design element on the extremely well preserved Pocklington shield, a scalloped border, "is not comparable to any other Iron Age finds across Europe, adding to its valuable uniqueness", commented Paula Ware, managing director at MAP Archaeological Practice Ltd, in late 2019. Horses were rarely included in Iron Age burials, making the find particularly significant. "The discoveries are set to widen our understanding of the Arras (Middle Iron Age) culture and the dating of artefacts to secure contexts is exceptional," according to Paula Ware.

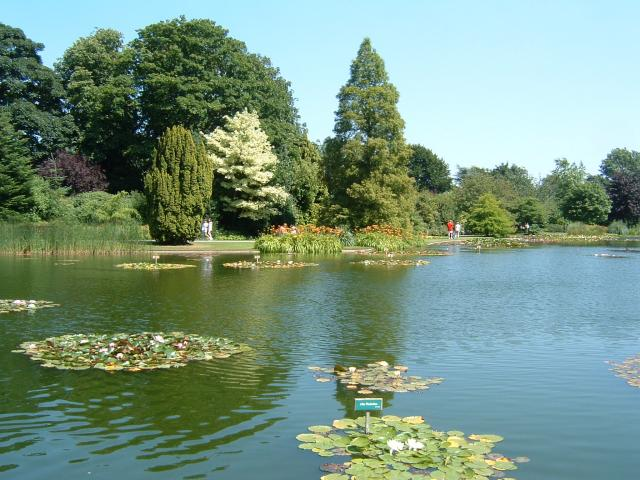
Burnby Hall Gardens

By the time of the Domesday Book in 1086, it was the second largest settlement in Yorkshire after York itself.

Pocklington developed through the Middle Ages while many similar places fell into dramatic decline. Pocklington owed much of its prosperity in the Middle Ages to the fact that it was a local centre for the trading of wool and lay on the main road to York, an important national centre for the export of wool to the continent. Wool was England's main export in the earlier Middle Ages.

=== Town heraldry ===
The town's coat of arms shield is based on that of the Dolman family, founders of Pocklington School. The arms were granted to the town council in 1980. The crown at the base of the shield is the emblem of the saints, and along with the gold cross, symbolises the town's historic connection with Paulinus of York and the Archbishop of York.

The town's motto is "Service with Freedom".

== Governance ==
Pocklington Town Council
- Coat of arms

Type
- Type: Town Council

Leadership
- Mayor: Roly Cronshaw
- Town clerk: Gordon Scaife
- Councillors: List of councillors: Richard Bryon (Lab); Stephen McCann (Ind); Sue Carden (Ind); Roly Cronshaw (Ind); Jon Duke (Ind); Patrick John (Ind); Ged Leach (Ind); Pam Powell (Ind); Robert Fisk (Ind); Stephen McMillan (Ind); Angus Ogilvy (Ind); Jim Davison (Ind)

Structure
- Seats: 13 Councillors
- Independent: 11 / 13
- Labour: 1 / 13
- Vacant: 1 / 13

Elections
- Voting system: Plurality-at-large
- Last election: 2 May 2023
- Next election: 4 May 2027

Meeting place
- Old Courthouse, Pocklington

Website
- www.pocklington.gov.uk

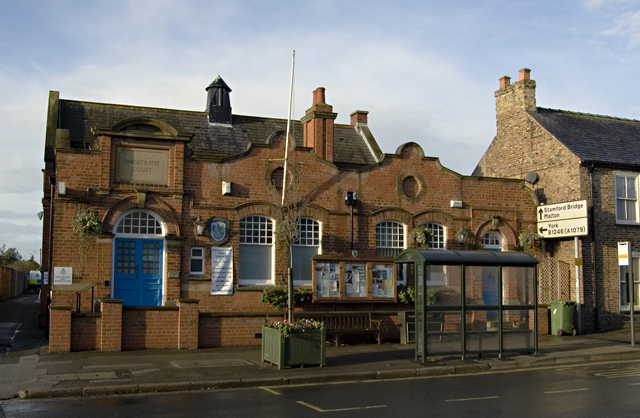
Old Courthouse

Pocklington is under East Riding of Yorkshire Council, a unitary authority. The town is part of the Pocklington Provincial Ward and returns three councillors to the council.

From 2001 to 2024 Pocklington was part of the East Yorkshire Parliamentary Constituency. It became part of the Goole and Pocklington constituency from 2024 onwards.

Pocklington's Town Council consists of thirteen elected councillors and is responsible for the cemetery, allotments, the Croft play-park and the Arts Centre. The Mayor of Pocklington is elected annually by the members of the town council.

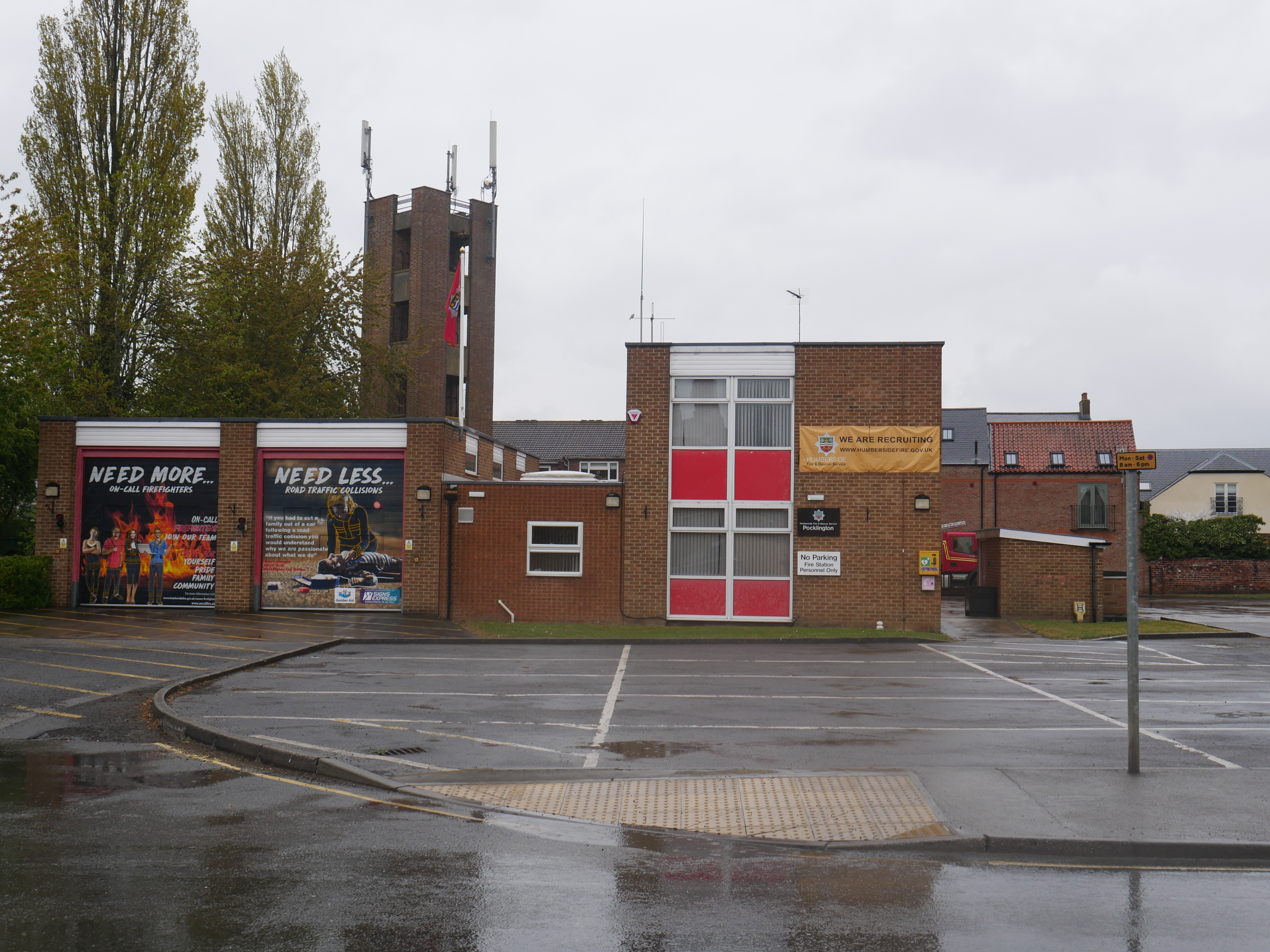
Pocklington Fire Station

The town council has a policy of naming all new streets using the surnames of the war dead who served at RAF Pocklington. This has given rise to the names Strother Close, Waite Close, Garrick Drive, Turnbull Close and Harper Close. There is some controversy surrounding the policy as a local resident believes that war heroes from Pocklington and nearby Barmby Moor should also be honoured in this way.

=== Town twinning ===
Pocklington is twinned with:

- Le Pays de Racan, France (Official)
- Trendelburg, Germany (unofficial)

== Education ==
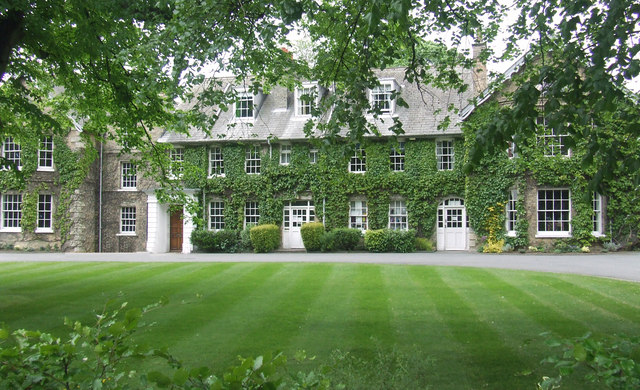
Pocklington School

=== Pocklington School ===
Pocklington School is an independent co-educational day and boarding school located on West Green. Founded in 1514 by John Dolman, it began as a grammar school during the reign of Henry VIII. Its foundation was authorised by royal letters patent, and in 1525 Dolman established five scholarships for pupils to attend St John's College, Cambridge.

Among its former pupils is William Wilberforce, the politician and abolitionist, who attended as a boarder from 1771 until 1776.

=== Woldgate School and Sixth Form College ===
Woldgate School and Sixth Form College is a state secondary school and sixth form located on Kilnwick Road, Pocklington. Established in September 1958 as Pocklington County Secondary School, it originally accommodated approximately 500 pupils. The school later became a comprehensive school and converted to academy status in January 2017. It provides education for pupils aged 11 to 18.

== Geography ==
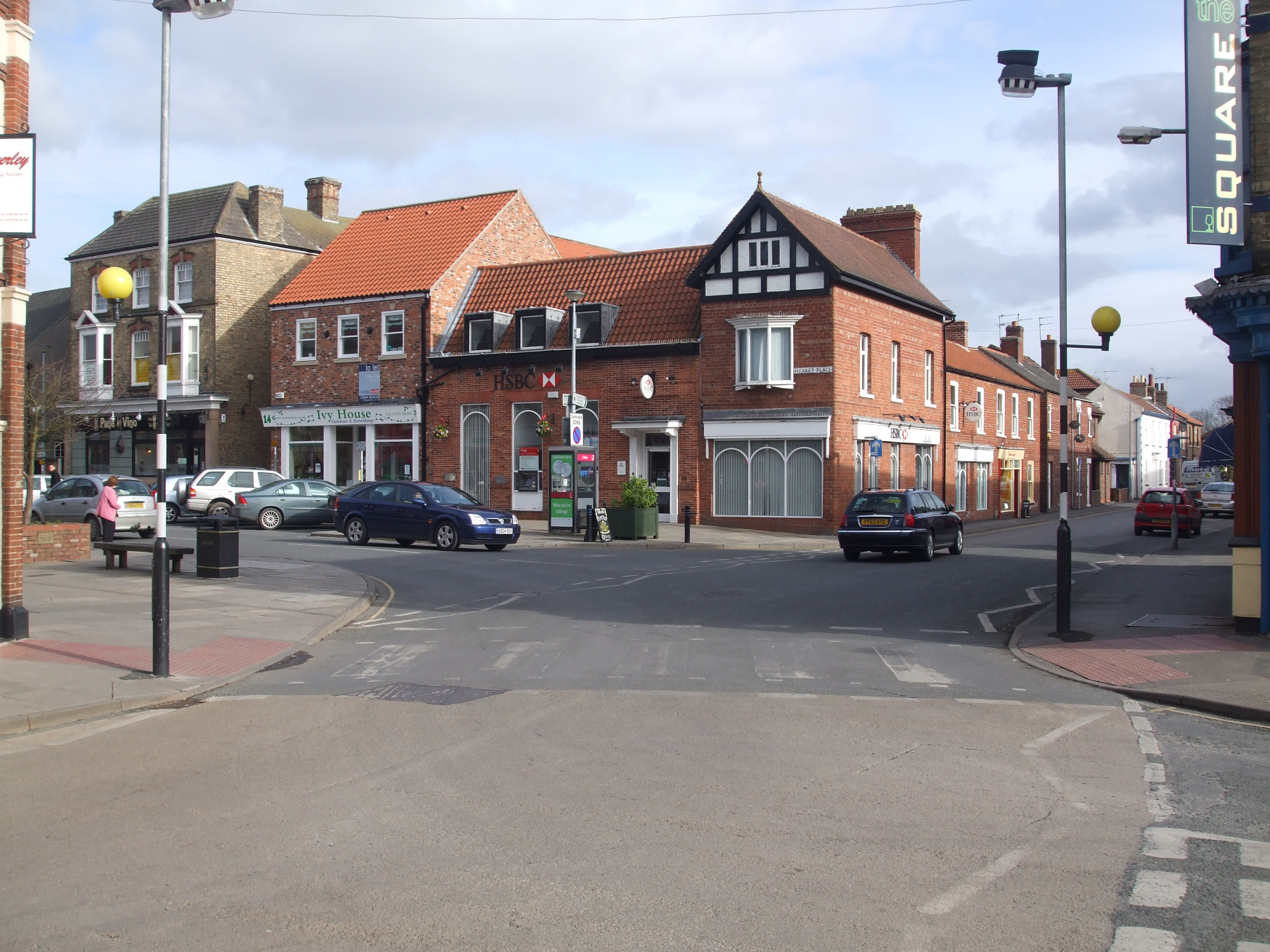
Market Place, Regent Street, Railway Street Junction

Pocklington is a spring line settlement at the foot of the Yorkshire Wolds. The rocks underlying this area were deposited on the bed of a tropical ocean. When the land rose, the chalk wolds were formed from the exoskeletons of micro-organisms covering the sea floor. The landscape around Pocklington therefore varies from flat arable land primarily devoted to agriculture to the south and west, and grassy, chalk hills and dry valleys to the north and east. A lot of the more level farming country was, from the Middle Ages onwards, reclaimed from marshland. Pocklington is bisected by the largely culverted Pocklington Beck, a small brook that feeds into the Pocklington Canal. The beck and canal are usually good fishing grounds but a sewerage overflow in 2003 killed thousands of fish and severely damaged the ecosystem, from which it is now recovered.

== Demography ==
According to the 2021 Census, Pocklington parish had a population of 10,123, an increase on the 2011 UK census figure of 8,337.

The civil parish is not very ethnically diverse, with the 2001 UK census reporting 98.4% of the 7,632 inhabitants being white.

The East Riding of Yorkshire has a higher than average level of Christian belief and a much lower rate of observance for other faiths and those of no faith. This can be attributed to the aforementioned lack of ethnic diversity in the area.

== Entertainment and culture ==
Pocklington Arts Centre (formerly the Oak House Cinema) opened in 2000 and offers "a mixed programme of film, music, drama, dance, lectures, workshops and exhibitions". Previous performers at the arts centre include the comedians Jenny Eclair, Clive James, Dave Gorman and Barry Cryer and the musicians Midge Ure and Steve Harley (in 2-man (2002), 3-man (2010, 2012, 2014 (twice), 2018–2019) and 4-man (2003) electro-acoustic sets only, no full rock band (i.e. Cockney Rebel shows). The centre also puts on "second screenings" of recently released films. The TV presenter Victoria Coren Mitchell used the name of the Pocklington Arts Centre for her Ormerod hoax.

In a tribute to Munich's traditional Oktoberfest, Pocklington hosts its own annual Pocktoberfest. Unlike the original on which it is based, Pocktoberfest is pared down to a single-issue event: beer. In the 2006 event, 19 casks (or about 452 litres) of ale were consumed. Organiser of the 2012 Pocktoberfest, Clare Saunders, arranged for brewers from Germany. Italy, France, Belgium and the Netherlands to attend the festival, which is sponsored by C & N Wines and Swirlz Ice Cream Emporium.

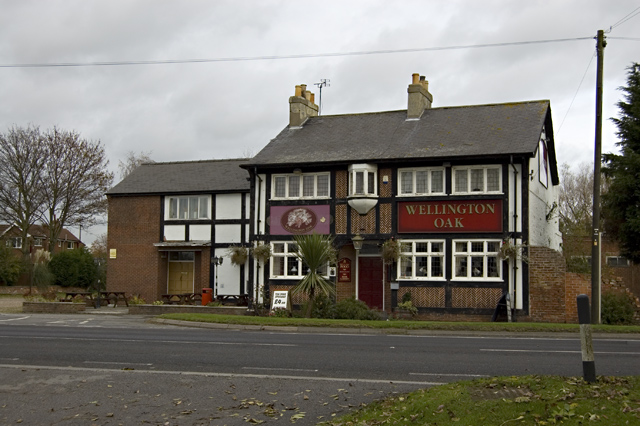
The Wellington Oak, one of many Pubs in Pocklington

Pocklington celebrates an annual Flying Man Festival with a multitude of themed events from 12 to 14 May, in memory of the showman Thomas Pelling, the "Flying Man of Pocklington", who, with a pair of homemade wings, tried to fly from the top of the local church, and was killed when he hit one of the church's buttresses.

=== Sport ===
The combined Pocklington School and Town Rugby Team in 1881

Pocklington RUFC rugby team is based on Burnby Lane. The first rugby game in Pocklington was held on West Green on Wednesday 12 November 1879 between Pocklington Town and District and Pocklington School.

The first Pocklington rugby club Pocklington F.C. was formed in 1885. The current club, formed in 1928, plays in Regional 2 North East and also hosts the traditional "Good Friday Sevens" tournament, which is Yorkshire's longest-established sevens tournament launched in 1958 and Pocklington's premier sporting event, which sees local, county-based and even international teams compete.

The town has a council-run Francis Scaife Sports Centre, which includes a 20-metre swimming pool and gym. The town has swimming, football and cricket clubs.

Kilnwick Percy Golf Club – locally known as the KP – lies just outside of Pocklington and offers luxury hotel rooms and lodges in addition to its championship golf course.

Pocklington's football club, Pocklington Town A.F.C., competes in the Humber Premier League. The club operates three other Saturday football teams alongside an U19s team and girls' team. In the 2012–13 season the club's 1st team won the highest level trophy in the club's history by winning the Whitehead's Fish & Chips Humber League Cup at North Ferriby United's Rapid Solicitors Stadium, a da decade later, the club were champions of the Humber Premier League. The club had floodlights installed during July 2008, allowing the club to make progress in the football league pyramid.

In 2007, Michael Woods, a Pocklingtonian, made his debut for Chelsea.

Pocklington Tennis Club, which has 6 astro-turf style courts and plays in both the York & District Tennis League and the Driffield & District Lawn Tennis League, is located on West Green.

Pocklington is a control point at the quadrennial London-Edinburgh-London long-distance bicycle event.

=== Media ===
Pocklington has a local weekly newspaper, the Pocklington Post, owned by Johnston Press. Television signals are received from either the Emley Moor or Belmont TV transmitter. The town is covered by both BBC Radio York and BBC Radio Humberside. A full-time community radio station, Vixen FM, based in nearby Market Weighton, broadcasts to the town. Also in the area is Beverley FM which serves Beverley and all of its surrounding areas, including Pocklington. A Pocklington-based community radio station, West Wolds Radio, went on air in November 2015 but closed in September 2016.

== Religion ==
Churches in Pocklington include:

- The Church of England parish church of All Saints, nicknamed the Cathedral of the Wolds. The Grade I listed building is 12th- and 13th-century and has a 15th-century west tower.
- Pocklington Christian Fellowship, formerly Pocklington Pentecostal Church, meets in the former Ebenezer Independent Chapel built for Dissenters in 1807.
- Pocklington Methodist Church, whose red brick Neoclassical building was completed in 1864 as a Wesleyan Methodist Church.

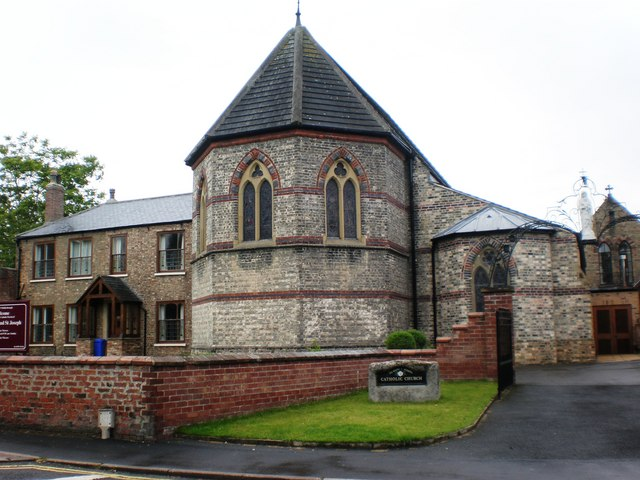
Church of St Mary & St Joseph

- The Roman Catholic church of SS Mary and Joseph, whose Gothic Revival brick building was completed in 1863 to replace a chapel dating from 1807.

There are no non-Christian houses of worship in Pocklington, but Kilnwick Percy Hall, just outside Pocklington, is now a large residential Buddhist Centre called Madhyamaka Kadampa Meditation Centre. It runs regular Buddhist meditation classes.

== Freemasonry ==
Pocklington has its own Masonic Hall which is situated on the Mile. It is home to several lodges and orders including:

- Beacon Lodge No. 4362
- Old Pocklingtonian Lodge No. 7867 – formed by former pupils of Pocklington School but membership is no longer restricted to those with a connection to the school.
- Beacon Chapter No. 4362

== Transport ==
=== Car ===
Pocklington lies near the A1079 road, the main arterial route between the cities of York and Hull.

=== Bus ===
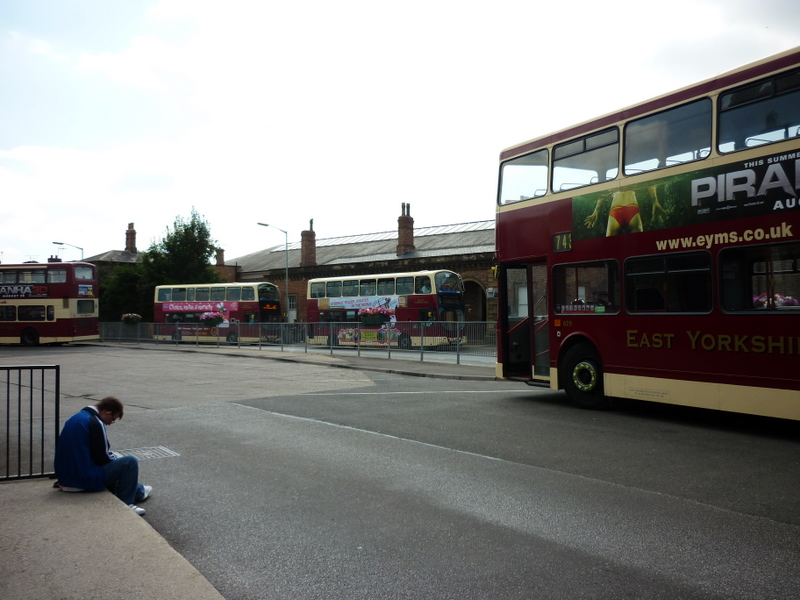
Pocklington Bus station

Pocklington is served by a number of bus routes provided by East Yorkshire Motor Services who have a depot in the town centre. Their X46 and X47 routes branded "EastRider" operate hourly through the town between York and Hull. York Pullman also serve the town with their route X36 service 6 days a week.

=== Air ===
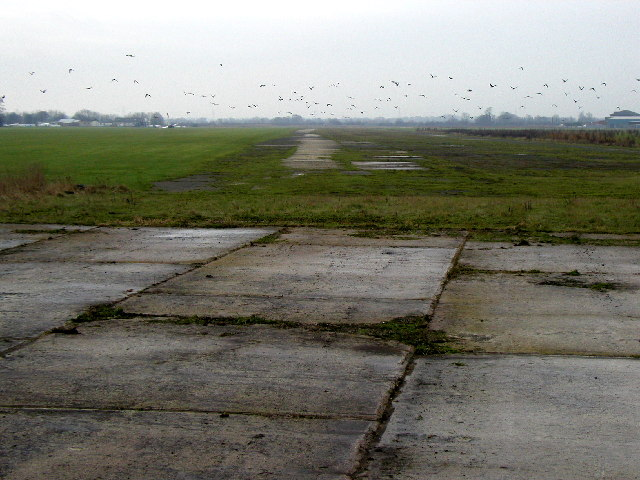
Pocklington Airfield

Pocklington Airfield has three concrete and tarmac runways of 1,600 yards (1,500 m), sufficient in length to take RAF bombers during the Second World War, but in September 1946 the airfield was closed. Although the site remains in use with gliders – and occasionally hot air balloonists – a lot of the concrete runway surface has gone, and the control tower is not in operation. It is therefore classified as "limited flying". The airfield is now wholly owned by the Wolds Gliding Club.

The nearest commercial airport is Humberside Airport, another former RAF airfield.

=== Rail ===
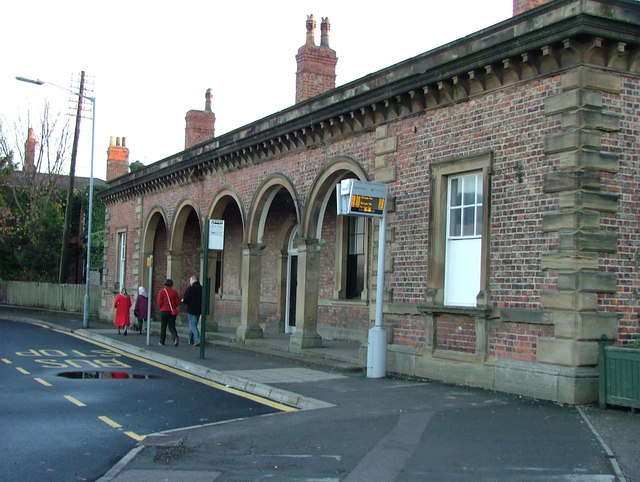
Pocklington Railway Station

Pocklington was once part of the rail network, with a railway station dating back to 1847. This was closed as a result of the Beeching Report in November 1965. There is a small but vocal pressure group that is trying to get the railway station and line re-opened. The City of York Local Transport Plan for 2006 noted that: "work has recently been undertaken by East Riding of Yorkshire Council to examine the feasibility of reopening the former direct York – Pocklington – Beverley line that closed in 1965... given the unavailability of funding for such a scheme at present and the extensive time required for any reinstatement of a rail line, the scheme remains a longer-term aspiration."

The Minsters Rail Campaign was campaigning to re-open the railway line between Beverley and York (with stops at Stamford Bridge, Pocklington and Market Weighton). The re-opened railway would skirt the southern edge of the town as the former alignment has since been developed. In 2006, the issue of re-opening the line was raised in Parliament and, although prohibitively expensive, was otherwise considered favourably. However, in 2013, East Riding of Yorkshire Council decided that the line could not be funded.

The old railway building, designed by George Townsend Andrews, was saved from demolition due to its interesting architecture. It now serves both as a bus shelter, and as a sports hall for nearby Pocklington School.

=== Boat ===
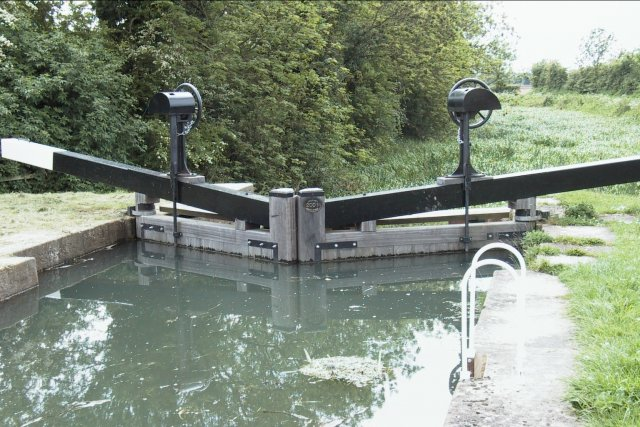
Pocklington Canal

The Pocklington Canal, in commercial use in the 19th century by barges, is now navigable as far as Bielby Basin. Full restoration of the canal is one of the aims of the Pocklington Canal Amenity Society, which was formed in 1969.

== Notable people ==
Alphabetically:

- Paul Banks, guitarist in Britpop band Shed Seven
- Matt Brash, celebrity vet, Zoo Vet at Large (TV series)
- Thomas Cooke, 19th-century scientific instrument maker, born in nearby Allerthorpe
- Adrian Edmondson, comedian, The Young Ones and Bottom
- Richard Herring, comedian, was born in Pocklington
- Ralph Ineson, comedian and actor in The Office and Game of Thrones
- Joseph Malet Lambert, 19th-century author and social reformer
- William Richardson (astronomer) (1797–1872), astronomer born in Pocklington
- George Herbert Stancer, cyclist, cycling journalist and administrator
- Sir Tom Stoppard, playwright
- Joseph Terry (1793–1850), founder of Joseph Terry & Sons, confectioner and industrialist
- Rob Webber, Sale Sharks and England rugby union player
- William Wilberforce, 18th-century anti-slavery campaigner
- Michael Woods, footballer, fourth youngest to ever play for Chelsea.

== See also ==
- Listed buildings in Pocklington
