= Victoria Gardens, Portland =

Park on the Isle of Portland, Dorset, England

Coordinates: 50.562°N 2.4473°W

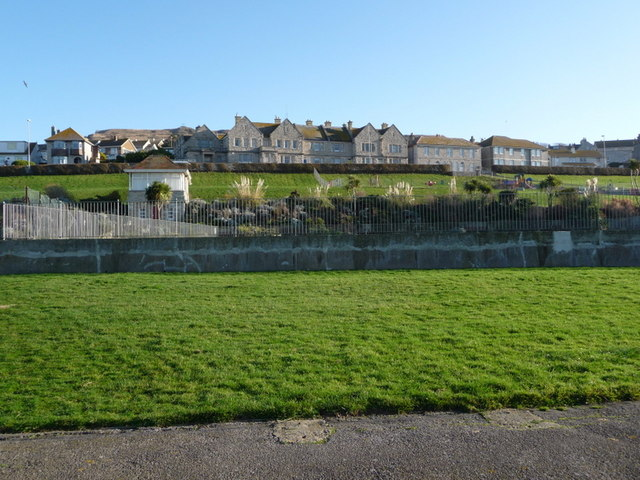
Victoria Gardens from the Western corner.

Victoria Gardens is a public garden, located at Underhill, Isle of Portland, Dorset, England. It is found close to Fortuneswell village and overlooks both Victoria Square and Chiswell. The gardens, which were created to mark the 1897 Diamond Jubilee of Queen Victoria, have remained a focal point since their opening in 1904.

The gardens are made up of grassed and formal bedding areas, with a large rockery running along its centre. There is a children's play area, tennis courts and a bowling green managed by the Portland Victoria Bowls Club.

== History ==
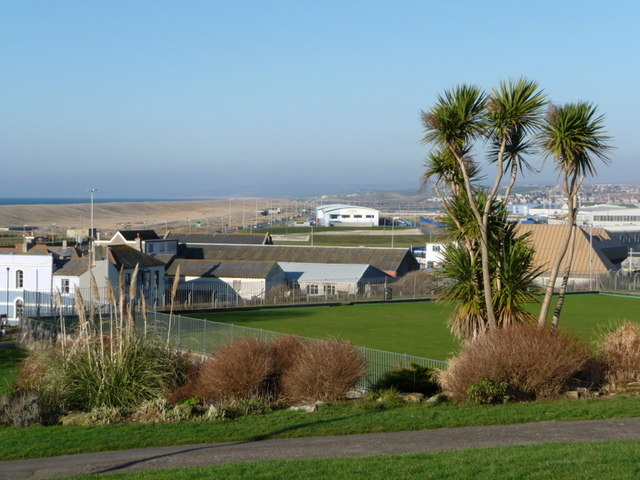
Victoria Gardens' bowling green.

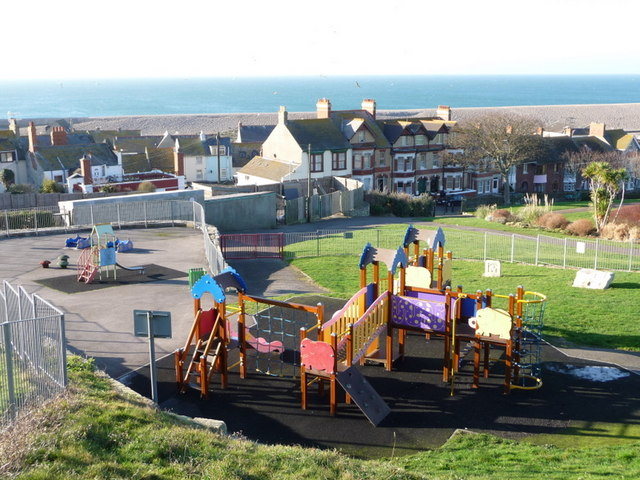
The play area of Victoria Gardens.

The idea of transforming the land known as Little Common into a public garden was first suggested in 1896, along with the transformation of another Portland site, Easton Square, into Easton Gardens. Plans for Little Common were drawn up by the surveyor Mr E. J. Elford in 1897 and approved in 1901. Once funding was secured, work began in November 1902 and Victoria Gardens were officially opened on 25 May 1904 by Mr Henry Sansom, Chairman of the Portland Urban District Council. The event was attended by thousands of local residents and visitors, and performances were provided by the Portland Town Band.

The original lower gate of the gardens was later replaced by a new set in 1953, made by the inmates of HM Prison The Verne. These were later removed but not replaced until 2015.

== D-Day Memorial ==
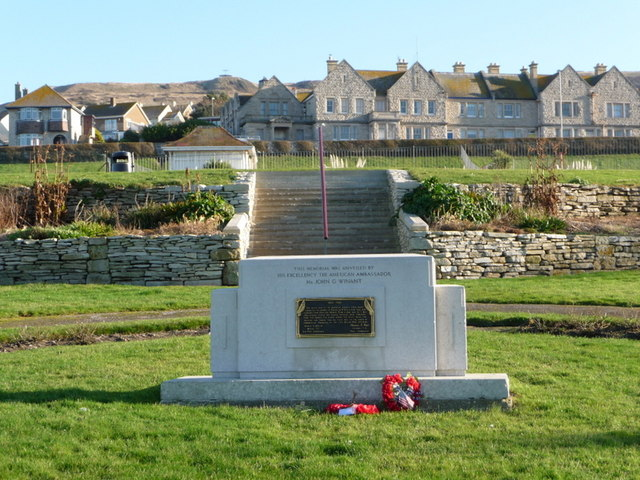
Victoria Gardens' D-Day memorial.

In 1944, Portland Harbour and its naval base were commissioned as part of USNAAB Portland-Weymouth, which was used as a major embarkation point for American troops during D-Day, particularly the US 1st Division who embarked for "Omaha Beach" in June 1944. Portland's role in the landings was celebrated on 22 August 1945, when American ambassador John Gilbert Winant unveiled a commemorative stone in the gardens.

The plaque attached to the stone reads: "The major part of the American Assault Force which landed on the shores of France on 'D' Day, 6 June 1944, was launched from Portland Harbor. From 6 June 1944 to 7 May 1945, 418,585 troops and 144,093 vehicles were embarked from this harbor. This plaque marks the route which the vehicles and troops took on their way to the points of embarkation. Presented by the 14th major port, U.S. Army." It is signed Harold G. Miller, Major, T.C., Sub Port Commander, and Sherman L Kibor, Colonel, T.C., Port Commander.
