= William Etty (architect) =

British architect

William Etty (c. 1675 – 1734) was an English architect and craftsman, best known for designing Holy Trinity Church, Leeds and (probably) Holy Trinity Church, Sunderland.

== Life and work ==
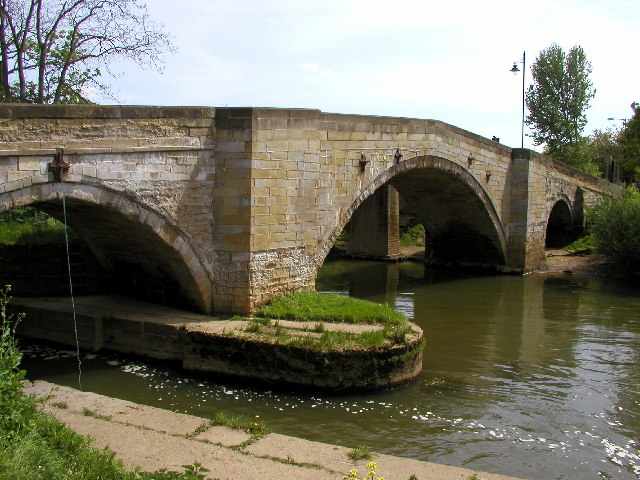
William Etty's 1727 bridge across the Yorkshire Derwent at Stamford Bridge

He was the son of John Etty of York (c. 1634 – 1708), also an architect and craftsman, to whom there is a monument in All Saints', North Street in York. William Etty's first known building was the Moot Hall, Leeds (1710, demolished in 1825). Holy Trinity, Sunderland, followed in 1719 and Holy Trinity Church, Leeds, in 1722–7 (the steeple is a later addition by R D Chantrell). He also worked at John Vanbrugh's Castle Howard from 1701 onwards and at Seaton Delaval Hall from 1719.

In York, he designed the reredos in St Michael le Belfrey in 1712, and may have been responsible for the Red House, Duncombe Place, and the frontage of the Mansion House.

Etty also contributed work to a number of country houses and estates, notably Temple Newsam House, Barrowby Hall (Austhorpe), Whixley Hall, Brocklesby Park, Holme Hall at Holme-on-Spalding-Moor, Scriven Park (Knaresborough), and Aldby Park.

In later life, he was clerk of works at Colen Campbell's Newby Park (Baldersby Park) in 1720–1, and, from 1729 until his death, on the mausoleum at Castle Howard designed by Nicholas Hawksmoor. In 1727, he built Stamford Bridge, a stone bridge across the River Derwent at Stamford Bridge.

Etty died in 1734, and Hawksmoor recommended that his son, John Etty (born in 1705), should succeed him at Castle Howard. John, the last of the Etty dynasty, died in 1738.
