= Holbrook Garden =

Garden in Devon, England

Coordinates: 50.9288°N 3.3631°W

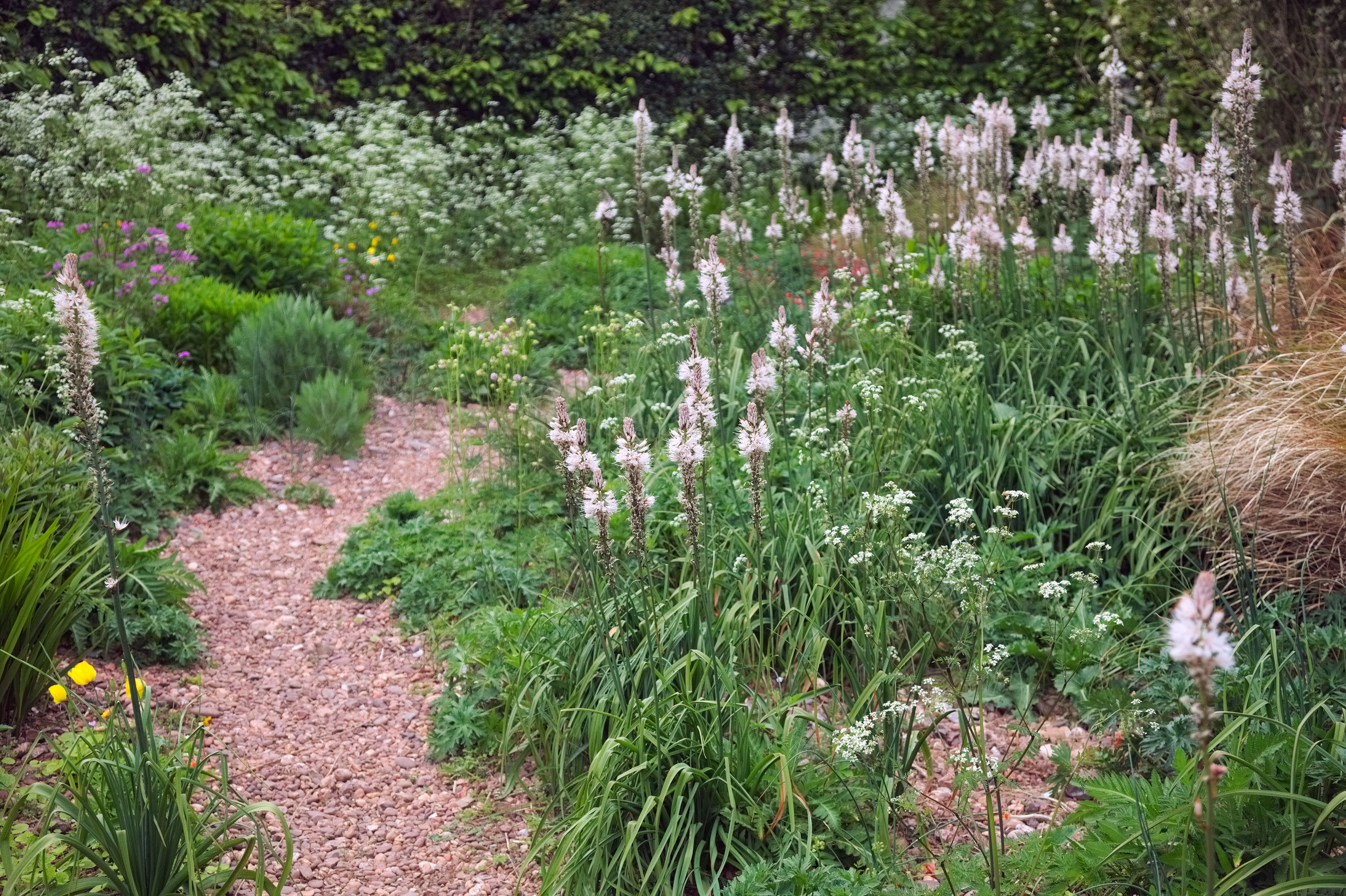
Naturalistic plantings at Holbrook

Holbrook Garden is a one hectare garden outside Sampford Peverell, Tiverton, Devon, with experimental naturalistic plantings creating differing habitats. The plantings draw on the German approach to naturalism but strongly influenced by wild plant populations and species. It is considered by the garden writer Noel Kingsbury to be, "One of the best examples of ‘New Perennial’ planting in Britain". The garden formerly held the UK national collection of the genus Helenium.
