= John Musgrave (disambiguation) =

John Musgrave (born 1948) is an American Vietnam veteran, poet, counselor, and veterans' affairs advocate.

John Musgrave may also refer to:

- John Musgrave (cricketer), English cricketer
- John Oliver Musgrave, New Zealand motor transport operator
- John Musgrave & Sons, a company that manufactured stationary steam engines

== See also ==
- Jonathan Musgrave, British orienteering competitor
