= Pocklington School =

Independent school in Pocklington, East Riding of Yorkshire, England

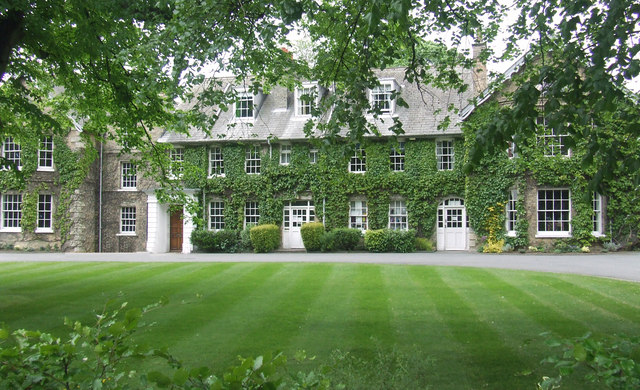

Location
- West Green; Pocklington, East Riding of Yorkshire, YO42 2NJ; England; 53.9290°N 0.7824°W

Information
- Type: Public School; Private school
- Motto: Latin: Virtute et Veritate (with courage and truth)
- Religious affiliation: Church of England
- Established: 1514; 512 years ago
- Founder: John Dolman
- Department for Education URN: 118132 Tables
- Head: Becky Lovelock
- Gender: Co-educational
- Age: 2 to 18
- Enrolment: 730
- Campus size: 50-acre (20 ha)
- Houses: 12
- Alumni: Old Pocklingtonians (“OPs”)
- Website: https://www.pocklingtonschool.com/

wha

Pocklington School is a public co-educational British private boarding and day school in Pocklington, East Riding of Yorkshire, England. It was founded in 1514 by John Dolman. The school is a part of the Headmasters' and Headmistresses' Conference and Independent Schools Council, it is situated in 50 acres (20 ha) of land, on the outskirts of the small market town, 12 miles (19 km) from York and 26 miles (42 km) from Hull. It is the 67th oldest school in the United Kingdom and celebrated its 500th anniversary in 2014.

== Introduction ==
The most common entry points are at Pre-School and Reception, at Pocklington Prep School and the First Year (Year 7), Third Year (Year 9) or Sixth Form in Pocklington School. Pupils can however be accepted for all school years subject to vacancy. All pupils are interviewed as part of the admissions process, depending on year of entry pupils may be required to sit a entrance examination test. Academic scholarships and exhibitions are offered to candidates for the First Year, Third Year and Sixth Form of Pocklington School. A limited number of Sixth Form Bursaries, worth up to 100% of the day tuition fee, are available to Sixth Form applicants.

As of the 2026–27 academic year, Pocklington School charges annual tuition fees of £25,542 for day pupils in Years 7–13, including Sixth Form students. Full boarding fees range from £40,773 per year for Years 7–8 to £49,335 for Years 9–13. Fees are payable in three termly instalments and include VAT. Pupils are also subject to an additional compulsory school lunch charge.

The current head is Becky Lovelock, who took over the role in September 2025.

Pocklington School has a number of traditions, such as the year group naming convention (first year, second year, etc.). It's three academic terms Michaelmas, Lent, and Summer are based on medieval Christian church calendar and the ancient university of Cambridge. Its motto Virtute et Veritate is Latin for With courage and truth.

There are six senior houses for the school altogether: Dolman, Gruggen, Hutton, Wilberforce, Fenwick-Smith, and Faircote. The Prep School operates a separate six-house system comprising Byland, Fountains, Jervaulx, Rievaulx, Dolman, and Orchard.

The school has an armed forces centre, located on the edge of campus in the Annand VC Cadet Centre. The Combined Cadet Force takes part in various competitions each year and cadets can attend camps around the country.

The school sports hall is housed in the train shed of the former Pocklington railway station, designed by George Townsend Andrews. The school runs outreach programmes engaging other schools, and working in the local community, as well as an app called Chatta to improve communication among preschool children, and has won awards for this work.

The School’s alumni or “Old Pocklingtonians” includes actors, bishops, CEOs, scientists and politicians.

== History ==
=== Tudor beginnings ===
Pocklington School’s foundation charter, February 1517

The historic seal of Pocklington School's religious guild.

John Dolman, a civil lawyer and ecclesiastic, founded Pocklington Grammar School, now known as Pocklington School. According to Venn and Venn’s biographical records he received his Bachelor of Civil Law in 1488 and his doctorate in 1494 and was appointed as a prebendary and archdeacon of Suffolk. His school was associated with a religious guild devoted to Jesus, the Virgin Mary and St Nicholas. H. B. Browne’s history records an endowment of twenty marks a year for the support of a grammar teacher.

Henry VIII’s licence of 24 May 1514 permitted the foundation; the school charter followed on 3 February 1517. By a deed dated 1 December 1525, Dolman endowed five scholarships and nine sizarships at St John's College, Cambridge, with income from lands in Yorkshire and Derbyshire. The deed valued the lands at £15 a year. Dowman reserved the right to choose the scholars during his lifetime. After his death, the Pocklington guild was to fill vacancies, giving preference to his relatives and otherwise choosing boys educated at his grammar school who met the college's standards of learning and conduct.

The deed also gave St John's College, Cambridge a role in overseeing the school. The master of the college, or a fellow sent in his place, was to examine the schoolmaster when visiting Pocklington. If he found the schoolmaster unsuitable, the guild was to replace him. The deed also provided for the scholarship lands to pass to Christ's College, Cambridge, if St John's failed to meet its obligations.

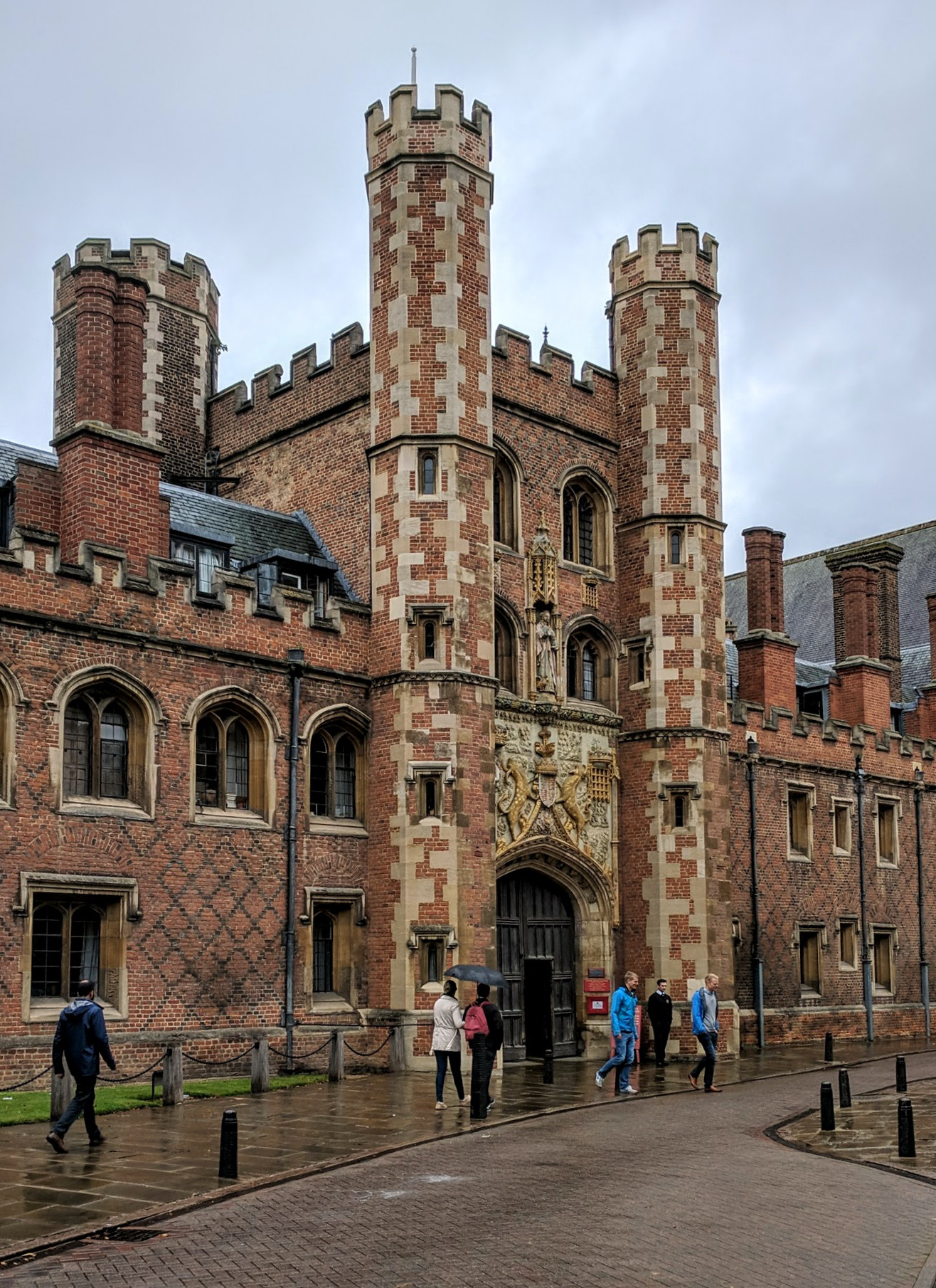
St John's College, Cambridge, patron of the school until 1875.

When the guild was dissolved under the Chantries Act 1547, St John's retained the scholarship lands, but the body responsible for nominating scholars ceased to exist. The arrangements made in 1552, with the support of the founder's kinsman Thomas Dowman, re-established the school and made its master and usher a corporation with perpetual succession. The legislation gave the schoolmaster, vicar and churchwardens of Pocklington the right to nominate pupils for vacant scholarships, making the school a feeder for st John's College, Cambridge.

The charter provided in 1517 allowed for free instruction in Latin grammar. The charter regulated the master’s duties, residence and conduct. Walter Carr, who was appointed by Dolman as the master, was set to receive £10 per year. The curriculum was based on established Latin grammatical and literary texts; the charter, however, restricted the use of Terence.

=== Seventeenth-century growth and setbacks ===
After the Tudor settlement the foundation’s prosperity fluctuated. John Lawson records complaints from the town that only two pupils remained in 1612. According to the people of the town the downfall of 1612 was due to the master’s neglect; Lawson also associated the collapse with the master’s acceptance of a benefice away from the school. Archbishop Sandys intervened over negligent teaching in 1581, urging St John’s College, Cambridge to appoint a suitable successor. A surviving register for 1650–1657 records boys aged between six and eighteen, most between eight and fifteen. William Wilberforce boarded later under the master Kingsman Baskett.

In 1650–1657 the school was once more on the rise under the headship of Edward Llewellyn who belonged to the Commonwealth-era of the school’s history. Hugh Aveling records Catholic pupils during this period, including boys from the notable Vavasour, Dolman and Dalton families. Llewellyn declared himself a Catholic in 1657 and subsequently resigned.

=== William Wilberforce ===
William Wilberforce is one of the school's most notable pupils. He attended as a boarder from 1771 to 1776. His mother sent him there after bringing him back from the care of his aunt and uncle, whose Methodist influence concerned his family. He arrived in November 1771, aged twelve, and lived with headmaster the Reverend Kingsman Baskett and his family in the headmaster’s house on West Green.

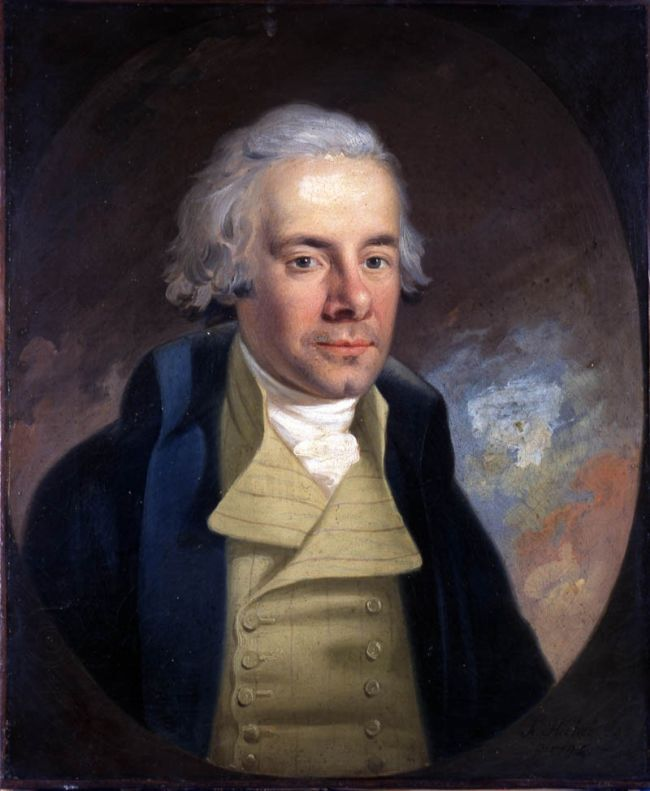
William Wilberforce (1794) by Anton Hickel

The Dictionary of National Biography describes Wilberforce as a popular pupil, particularly admired for his singing, who performed well in composition and learnt much English poetry despite his limited application to schoolwork. He left for St John's College, Cambridge, in October 1776. According to local historian Phil Gilbank, while at Pocklington he wrote a letter to a York newspaper condemning slavery at the age of fourteen.

Wilberforce is famous as the parliamentary campaigner who brought about the abolition of the slave trade and the emancipation of slaves. A statue of a freed slave sculpted by Peter Tatham (1983–1993) is in the centre of the St Nicholas Quadrangle. A bronze statue of Wilberforce as a boy, by York sculptor Sally Arnup, stands near the school foyer. Dr John Sentamu unveiled the new statue in autumn 2007, which was erected in commemoration of the 200th anniversary of the emancipation of slaves in the British Empire. Pocklington School appeared in a television programme entitled In Search of Wilberforce, made by former BBC news presenter Moira Stuart, and first shown on BBC 2 on 16 March 2007.

=== Nineteenth-century decline and Gruggen ===
In his 1818 Letter to Sir Samuel Romilly, Henry Brougham criticised Pocklington as an endowed school educating just one boy and claimed that the schoolroom had become a sawpit. This account was qualified by James J. Fishman’s study of charity reform: fellows of St John’s College, Cambridge visited in 1817 and recommended improvements; however, by the time the letter had appeared the school had been rebuilt, a council heritage account identifies that the master’s house and schoolroom of 1818 are the earliest surviving school buildings that still remain on the site. . Nonetheless, Fishman records that though the school had been rebuilt it still educated only twenty boys with an annual income of £1,000.

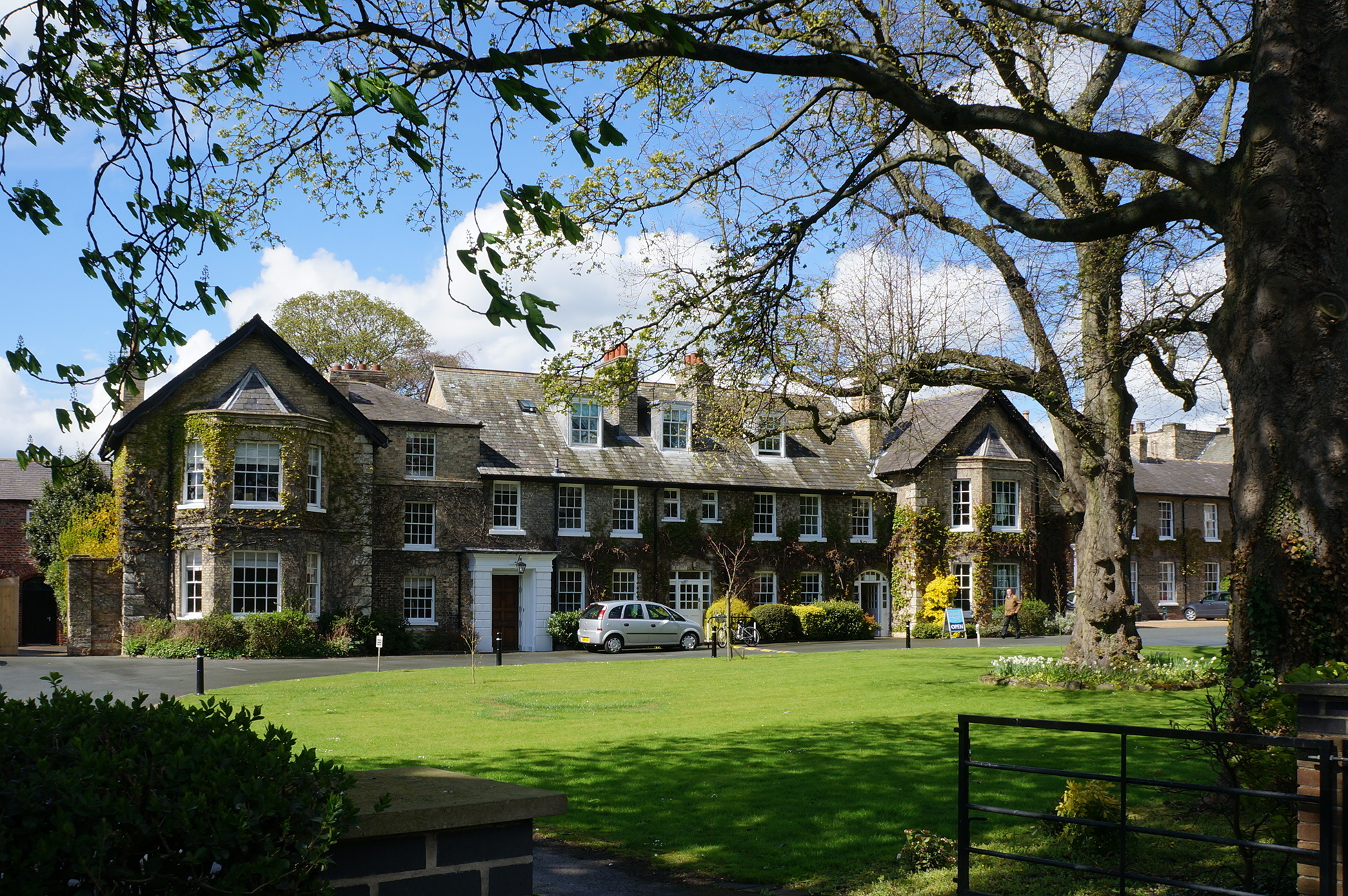
Pocklington School buildings on West Green dating back to 1818

The endowment’s income depended on the management of its landed estates. The 1857 directory reports Thomas Shield found an income of roughly £100 a year in 1807 and increased it to £1,000 with the use of litigation overturning disadvantageous leases. According to the directory the rebuilding remained incomplete until Gruggen was appointed in 1848.

In the archive catalogue there is a period in the 1840s described as having only one pupil, followed by a revival under Frederick James Gruggen, who was a headmaster from 1848 to 1872.

Frederick James Gruggen, headmaster from 1848 to 1872, was a fellow of St John's College, Cambridge, and the last headmaster appointed by the college. He revised the curriculum and oversaw a recovery in pupil numbers, which reached 43, including 25 boarders, according to the directory academic successes were reported by former pupils at Cambridge.. White's directory of 1858 lists the Rev. E. B. Slater as second master and the Rev. S. Wilson as assistant master.

Pocklington Grammar School Land Ownership 1862 - 852 acres, 3 roads, 4 perches

In 1850–51, Gruggen raised approximately £4,000 for rebuilding. About a quarter came from a loan from St John's College, Cambridge at four per cent interest; the published school history suggests that much of the remainder came from his own funds. The work included the white-brick frontage of 1851, with two-storey bay windows and a classical doorway. Wilberforce Lodge followed in 1858 as accommodation for the second master, while St John's Lodge and Dolman House were subsequently built and rented out.

Gruggen also consolidated, extended and improved the school's landholdings. An estate map of 1862 records holdings principally at Barmby Moor, with additional land at Pocklington, Acklam and Cayton Lodge near Filey. An external inspection published in 1870 was largely favourable. Due to the major successes of Frederick James Gruggen a schoolhouse was named after him, which continues to be operational to this day.

=== Late-Victorian reformations and recovery ===
In 1875, the Endowed Schools Commissioners transferred control of Pocklington Grammar School from St John's College, Cambridge, to a local governing body of twelve members. Admiral Arthur Duncombe was its chairman by 1889. The scheme ended the headmaster's freehold tenure and broadened the curriculum. Historian John Lawson associated the reforms with improved finances and the school's gradual development from an endowed grammar school into a public school.

The 1879 Post Office Directory reported that pupil numbers had risen under the Reverend Charles Gilmour Wilkinson and that additional buildings had been erected during his headship. By 1889, however, enrolment had fallen to ten under his successor, the Reverend Herbert London. London's successor, Charles Frederick Hutton, brought forty boarders from Daventry Grammar School, raising enrolment to fifty.

=== Hutton, financial troubles, and after war expansion ===
During Charles Frederick Hutton’s headmastership (1889–1910), it was reported pupil numbers and facilities had expanded. Hutton brought 40 boarders from Daventry to join the ten students who remained at Pocklington. Kelly's Directory listed eight awards of £7 10s a year for local day boys and foundation scholarships of £20 a year for boarders, awarded by examination. The Worsley fund, transferred from Daventry Grammar School, supplemented scholarships held at Pocklington and open scholarships won by boys leaving the school. Enrolment reached approximately 100 by 1892 and 150 roughly by 1905.

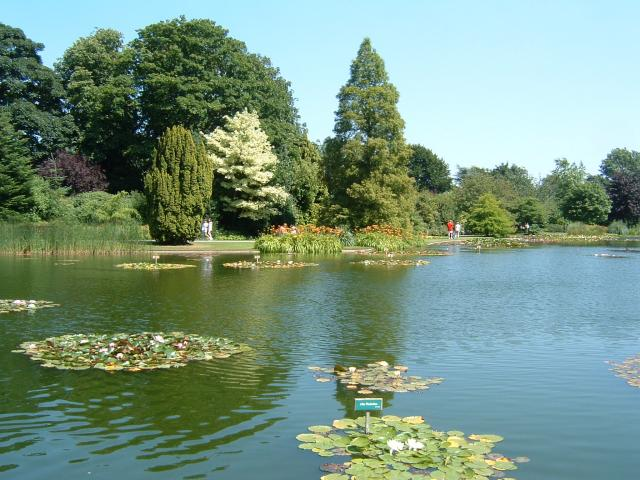
Burnby Hall and Gardens.

Percy Marlborough Stewart taught Hebrew at the school and later became known as Major Stewart of Burnby Hall. His gardens and collections became Burnby Hall Gardens and the Stewart Museum in Pocklington. Under Hutton, pupils obtained university scholarships in Hebrew, classics, science and mathematics. A gymnasium, chemical laboratory and infirmary were built in 1890–1891, followed by a new wing in 1898.

Sport was prominent during Hutton's headmastership. In 1892, the school cricket XI won every match it played. Facilities developed during this period included a cricket pavilion in 1893, a fives court in 1896, and a new dormitory with classrooms beneath it and a bell tower in 1898. A further science laboratory followed in 1907. The school magazine adopted the title The Pocklingtonian in 1891, succeeding the earlier Annual Register.

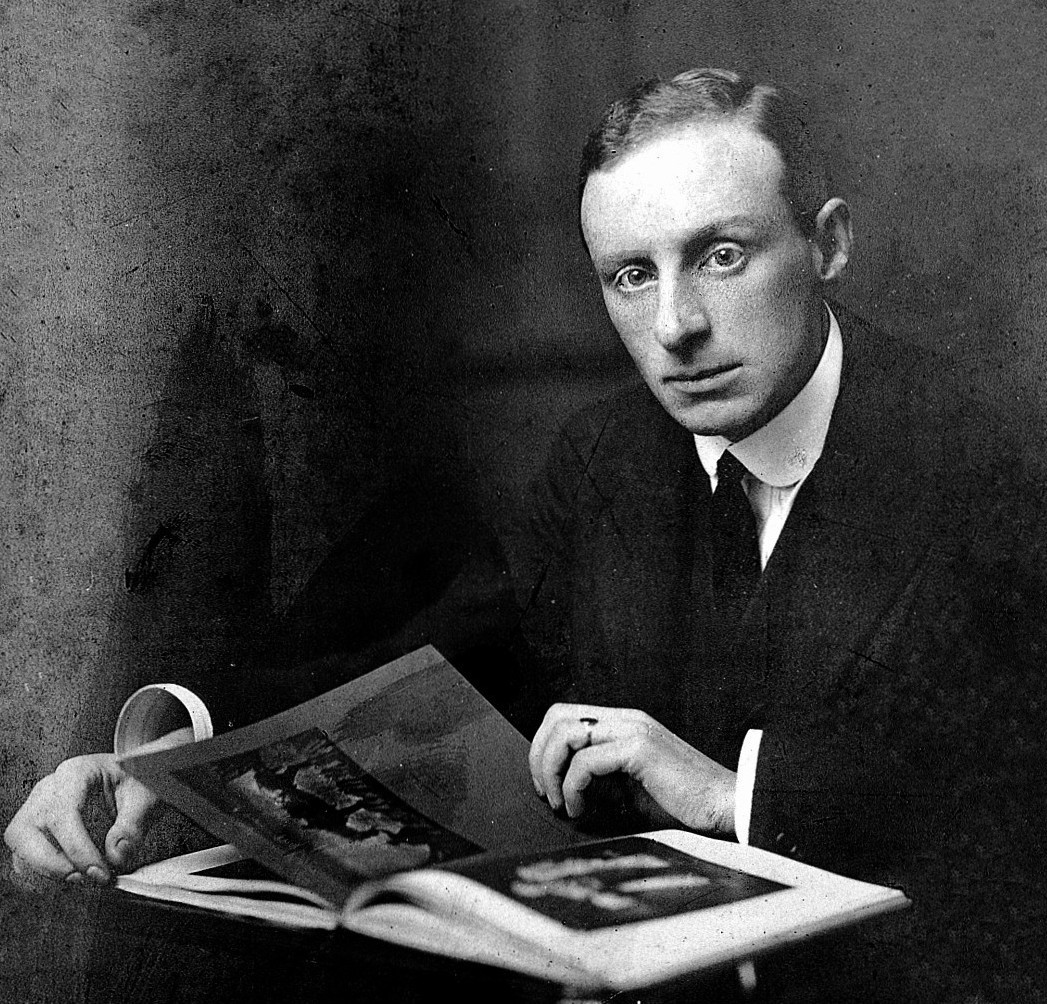
Charles McMoran Wilson c. 1900

Links between former pupils developed during Hutton's tenure, with the first Old Pocklingtonians' Club dinner and cricket tour taking place in April 1898, although a permanent organisation was not established until 1915. Hutton was invited to join the Headmasters' Conference. Among the pupils educated during his headmastership was Lord Moran, who later became Winston Churchill's physician and president of the Royal College of Physicians. Despite this growth, low fees and poor financial management would contribute to difficulties towards the end of Hutton’s tenure. By 1909-1910 the school’s overdraft had exceeded £4,000, an unfavourable Board of Education inspection preceded Hutton’s departure in 1910. A day house was named after Hutton, which still operates to this date.

The 2014 historical synopsis records that soon after the appointment of Sands as the new head in 1914 the local education authority’s grant was threatened to be withdrawn, this was when low enrolment put the school’s survival in doubt. Subsequent growth made a junior house necessary in 1919; a brief decline followed during the Depression of 1929-31.

Kelly’s 1937 directory documents the scale of interwar expansion. It describes the assembly hall, new laboratories and classrooms opened in 1932, and the school’s scholarships and boarding provision.

=== War years and commemoration ===
Accounts from the school magazine describe blackout precautions during Zeppelin raids in 1916. The school magazine recorded that an election for Sergeant-at-Arms was interrupted when the lights were extinguished during an alert. Another school account recalled townspeople asking the headmaster to quieten the pupils, fearing that their voices might attract the attention of an airship overhead. The First World War memorial was unveiled in 1921 by former headmaster Hutton. A newspaper report identifies the designer as Allan Foxley, an Old Pocklingtonian, and records that head Percy Sands participated in the ceremony.

At the outbreak of the Second World War, Pocklington had approximately 200 pupils and was operating at capacity. Wartime blackout restrictions limited dormitory lighting to dim blue bulbs. Pupils assisted local farmers, filled sandbags for the local authority and dug a trench in the Dolman playing field as protection against air raids. Much of the same field was converted to vegetable cultivation.

An aerodrome was constructed near the school in 1941. In September that year, anti-personnel bombs fell around the school; the published school history records that no injuries occurred, although much of the window glass was blown out.

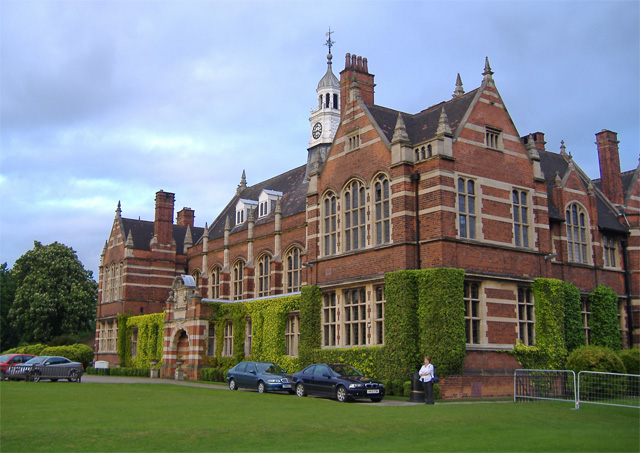
Hymers College, Hull Site

The school’s retrospective account records that pupils and staff of Hymers College shared the Pocklington School premises after evacuating from their Hull site in September 1939, with the last of the cohort returning in December 1942. Pocklington compressed its teaching to six morning periods leaving the facilities available to Hymers in the afternoons. Among those educated at Pocklington after wartime evacuation was the musicologist, Eric Roseberry.

In 1955 the Memorial Pavilion opened following an appeal which supported the first XI cricket field. It commemorated former pupils who had died in the two world wars. The association’s account of the pavilion’s seventieth anniversary reports renewed research into other rolls of honour: additional names were identified and two people listed were found to have survived. Remembrance continues through a yearly Armistice service at the pavilion.

=== Post-war development ===
The school became direct-grant in 1945 and independent in December 1975. Lyndhurst, a site elsewhere in the town, became a junior school in 1951, which was then moved across to the main Pocklington School campus in 1987 and renamed Pocklington Prep School in 2014. The school’s sporting history dates becoming full co-education (allowing attendance of girls) to 1989.

Historical synopsis records that by 1950 there were roughly 300 boys and about 500 by the time Pitts Tucker retired in 1966. Post-war demand also led to overcrowding; building appeals supported substantial improvements between 1958 and 1965. In 1976 a Pocklington team won the BBC’s Young Scientists of the Year competition. The project was an oscillating-aerofoil wind pump. An alumni account from David Quarton credits design teacher John Jeffery with guiding this project.

=== Sir Tom Stoppard ===
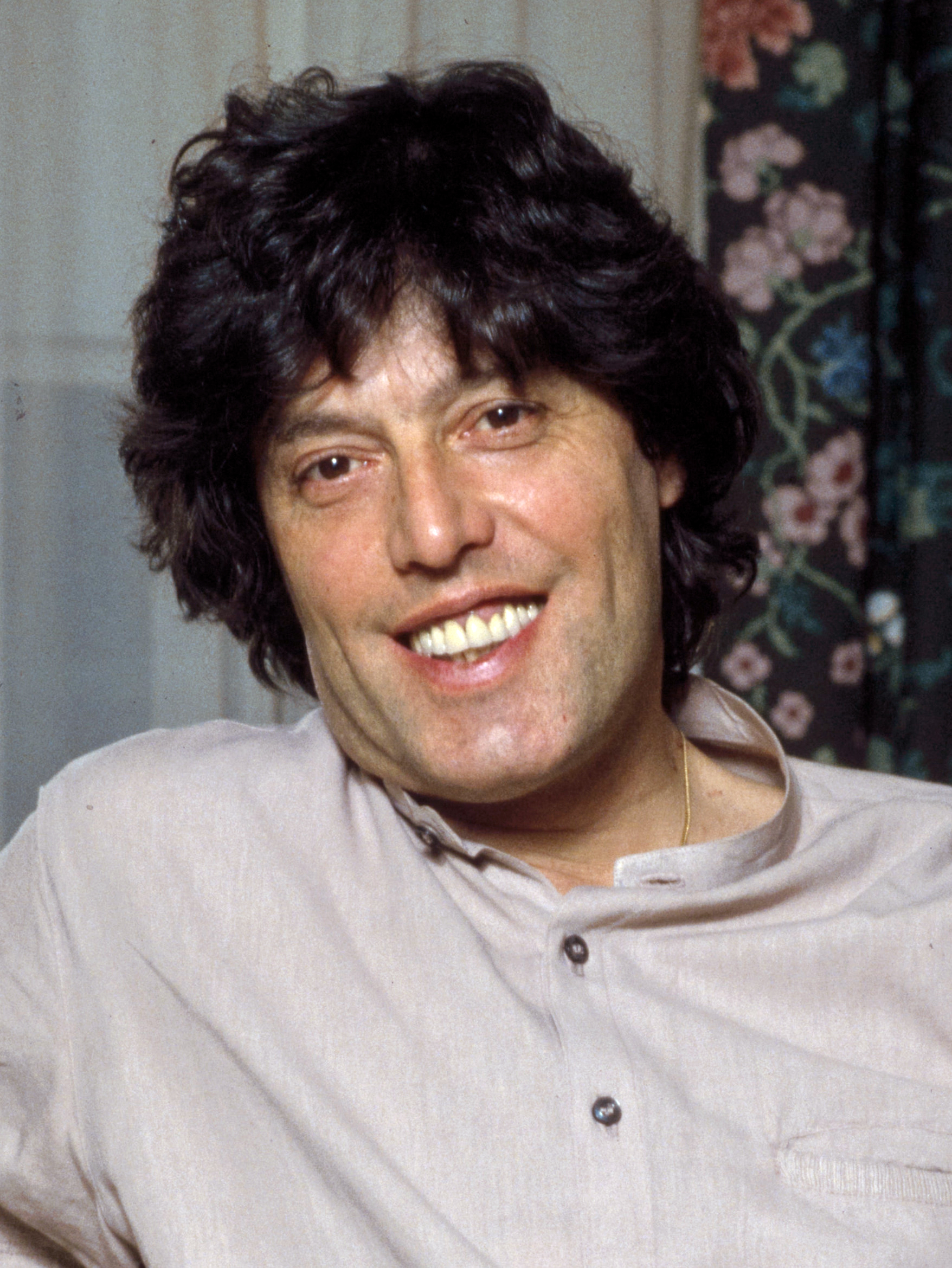
Tom Stoppard, playwright, NYC (cropped)

Sir Tom Stoppard another one of Pocklington School's highly notable pupils attended as a boarder from 1951 to 1954. In his final year, he received an award for Use of English at the school's prizegiving. His studies concentrated on classics and history, alongside the required courses in mathematics and science. According to Stephen Abbott's account, his principal extracurricular interests were the debating society and cricket. He played first-XI cricket; a later newspaper profile described him as academically average and a target of bullying.

Abbott records that Stoppard ironically did not participate in school theatre beyond studying Shakespeare in English lessons, which he later recalled finding uninteresting. He completed O-levels in Greek and Latin, but subsequently described leaving school with little enthusiasm for intellectual pursuits. Among his teachers was the musician and instrument-maker Christopher Monk. Stoppard left school in 1954, aged seventeen, to become a journalist on the Western Daily Press in Bristol.

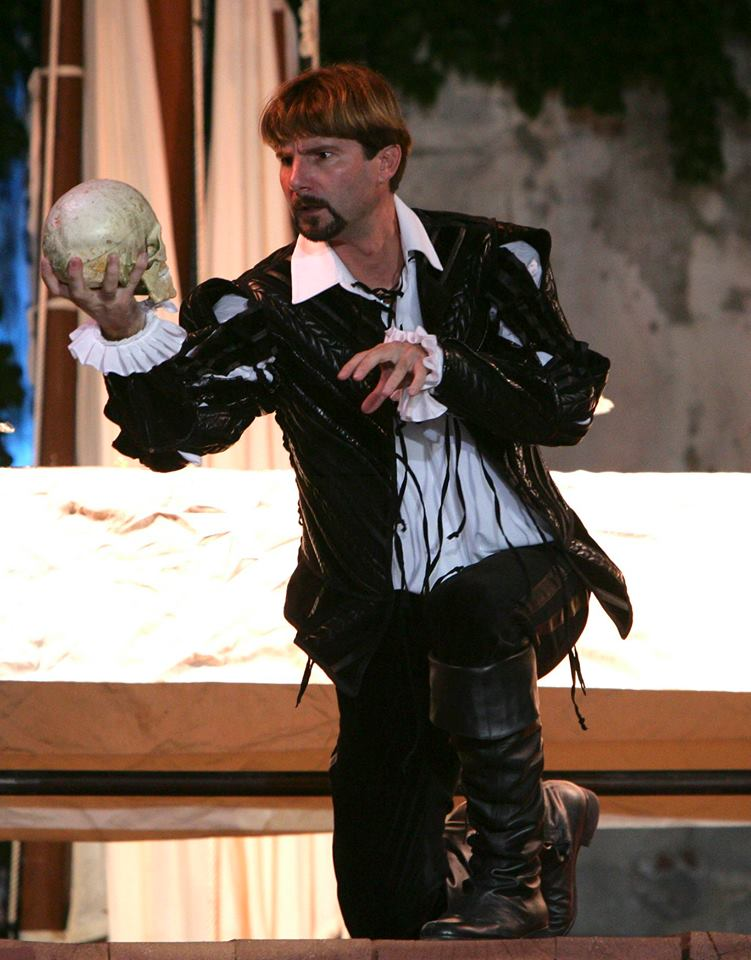
Josip Zovko as Hamlet in Rosencrantz & Guildenstern are Dead.

Stoppard became known for plays including Rosencrantz and Guildenstern Are Dead (1966), The Real Thing (1982) and Arcadia (1993). His work combined verbal comedy with philosophical, historical and scientific themes. He was knighted in 1997 for services to literature. He also co-wrote the screenplay for Shakespeare in Love (1998), for which he shared the Academy Award for Best Original Screenplay.

During the 1967–68 school year, pupils attended a performance of his play Rosencrantz and Guildenstern Are Dead at the Grand Theatre in Leeds, an outing recorded in the school magazine. On 1 May 2001, Stoppard returned to open the school's 300-seat Tom Stoppard Theatre, named in his honour.

=== Changes to traditional working week ===
In November 2020 the school announced a change to the week, Saturday academic lessons would be removed, introducing a five-day academic week from September 2021. Saturdays were retained for sports fixtures and an updated boarding programme. This announcement also proposed longer lessons, extended term dates, additional curriculum choices and an improved tutor programme. MTM Consulting, who researched parental views of the school, described the decision as being made following parent surveys, forums and staff consultations.

Weekly and part-time boarding arrangements were reworked alongside the change in timetable. An announcement made in February 2021 revealed a Monday morning to Friday evening boarding option, known as weekly boarding, with measures for Sunday night arrival and participation in Friday night and Saturday boarding activities

=== First female head ===
In October 2024, the governors of Pocklington School announced the appointment of Becky Lovelock to succeed Toby Seth as Head of the Pocklington School Foundation from 1 September 2025. Her appointment made her the first female Head in the school's history, more than five centuries after its foundation in 1514.

Before joining Pocklington, Lovelock was Deputy Head Academic at Sydney Grammar School in Australia. She studied mathematics at the University of Bristol and completed a master's degree in Teaching and Learning at the University of Oxford.

== Sport ==
Sport at Pocklington includes timetabled games, inter-house competitions and fixtures against other schools. The Senior School's programme includes rugby union, hockey, cricket, netball, tennis and athletics, with additional activities offered through clubs and external competitions. Former Yorkshire cricket captain David Byas leads the sports department.

The Prep School provides swimming, gymnastics, dance, cross-country and athletics, with competitive rugby, hockey and netball beginning from Year 3. Its published programme provides at least four hours of physical activity a week from Reception to Year 2, including swimming, physical education and Forest School, and at least five hours of sport from Year 3.

=== Rugby union ===
The combined Pocklington School and Town Rugby Team in 1881

The first recorded rugby match in Pocklington took place on West Green on 12 November 1879, between Pocklington Grammar School and a town and district side. Local historian Phil Gilbank identifies the organiser as the Reverend Walter Walters, an assistant master who had played rugby in Wales and at Cambridge. School and town subsequently combined to play a small number of fixtures each season.

According to the school's sporting history, an unbeaten season in 1880–81 was followed by declining enrolment and a switch to association football in 1884. Regular rugby resumed in 1911 under George Haydn Keeton, and the rugby centenary was celebrated in 1979–80.

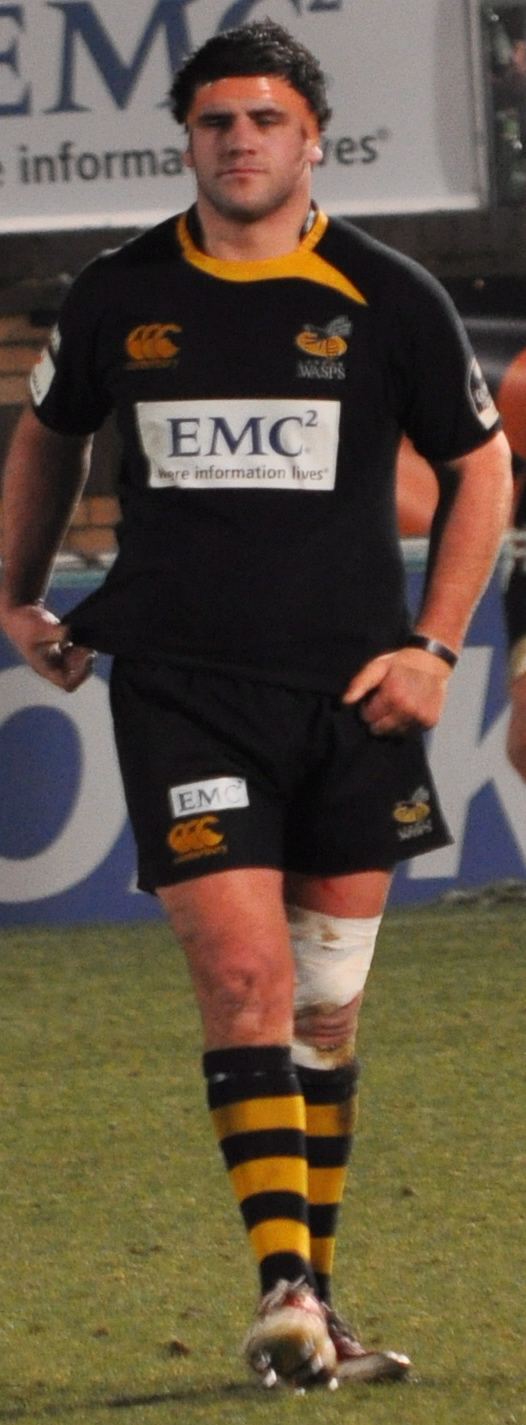
Rob Webber vs Newcastle, 2010.

Former pupil Rob Webber represented England at age-group level while at school and later won 16 senior caps, including appearances at the 2015 Rugby World Cup. Another former pupil, Diccon Edwards, played rugby union for Leicester and Leeds and rugby league for Castleford, before becoming a coach with Leeds and the England under-20 programme.

In 2017, the under-15 side reached the final of the inaugural NatWest Schools Bowl. Its route included a 24–0 semi-final victory over King's Priory School, following wins against Wolfreton, Richmond, Millthorpe, Birkdale and Clevedon. The final against Beths Grammar School was scheduled at Sixways Stadium in Worcester.

The school also participates in rugby sevens. In Lent term 2025 it hosted five sevens and tens competitions involving more than 500 players from 15 schools, and entered more than 18 sevens competitions with pupils from Years 6 to 13. In 2026, its under-13 team won all four matches at the Rosslyn Park Preparatory National Sevens, played in a one-day waterfall format.

Pocklington School won the town club's Good Friday sevens tournament in 1960, taking the W. S. Fowler Challenge Trophy. The tournament's honours list also records a school victory in the M. B. Herring Plate in 1981.

=== Cricket ===
==== Early history and grounds ====
Playing fields at St Peter's School, York, which played Pocklington in two recorded cricket matches in 1853.

Pocklington played two matches against St Peter's School, York, in 1853, with each school winning once. These are identified in St Peter's account as its earliest recorded cricket matches. During Charles Frederick Hutton's headmastership, Pocklington's first XI won all its matches in 1892, and a pavilion was built in 1893. The first Old Pocklingtonians' Club dinner and cricket tour followed in April 1898.

Former pupils funded a replacement War Memorial Pavilion, opened in 1955 by Colonel Sir Percy Simner in memory of those killed in the two world wars. It replaced the wooden pavilion of 1893 on a different site. The development coincided with the acquisition of adjoining allotments to extend the school's playing fields.

==== Post-war teams and individual recognition ====
In its account of the 1965 season, Wisden Cricketers' Almanack reported that Pocklington won six of its seven inter-school matches unaffected by rain, drawing the other. It highlighted Johnson and Jackson's batting, Flitton's bowling and Aldred's wicketkeeping. C. R. Flitton took 42 wickets at an average of 8.52. The following season's school return recorded ten wins, one defeat and two draws, with a further match abandoned.

Colin Johnson was retrospectively selected as the Wisden Schools Cricketer of the Year for 1966 when the publication extended its award back to 1900 in 2021. The retrospective selections were based on school performances recorded in the almanack; the annual award itself had been introduced in 2007.

Rex Alston's Wisden report described 1978 as Pocklington's best season to that date in terms of results, with twelve victories against other schools. J. D. Guillen scored 967 runs and captain A. G. Brumfield 719; Alston also praised the team's fielding.

==== National competitions and the Pocklington Pixies ====
The cricketer and schoolmaster Mike Stevenson ran cricket at Pocklington and founded the Pocklington Pixies club. A team drawn from former pupils, the Pixies reached the inaugural national club knockout final in 1969. The Yorkshire Premier League North's history identifies Colin Johnson, Malcolm Milne, Alasdair Swann and Paul Jackson among its players. The final against Hampstead took place at Edgbaston on 13 September 1969. CricketArchive also records the Pixies' quarter-final against Formby at the school ground and their semi-final against Steetley.

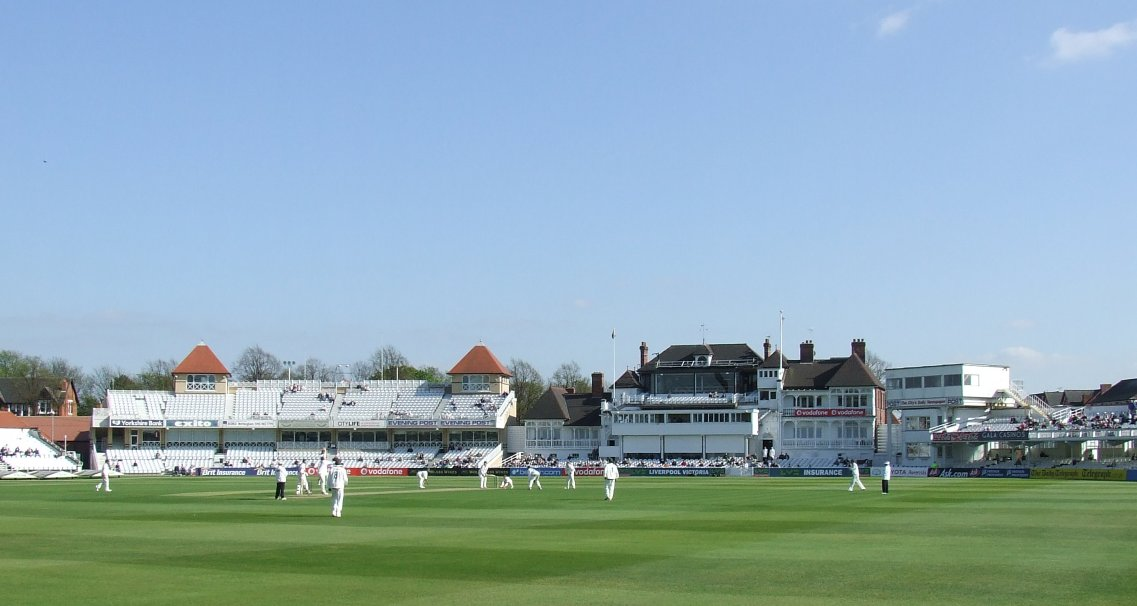
Trent Bridge, the scheduled venue for the rain-abandoned 1993 final, after which Pocklington and Millfield shared the Lord's Taverners Trophy.

In 1993, the school under-15 XI shared the national Lord's Taverners Trophy with Millfield after the final at Trent Bridge was rained off. The school's retrospective account of the 1992–93 academic year also records Scott Boswell's selection for England Schools, MCC Schools and Young England, and three first-XI centuries by captain Matthew Atkinson.

In 2011, King's School, Chester, identified Pocklington as the East Yorkshire winners when reporting its Lord's Taverners Colts Trophy campaign. In the 2017 National Schools Twenty20 competition, Pocklington won its North East group after victories over Hymers and Woodhouse Grove, before losing to Worksop in the section semi-final.

==== Girls' cricket and current provision ====
The 2025–26 co-curricular handbook lists seven Senior School boys' teams and identifies cricket as a summer games option. It also records girls' cricket replacing rounders. The school hosted its first senior girls' cricket festival in the summer term of 2025. In April 2026, its girls' side advanced in the Cricket Paper Under-18 100-ball competition after defeating Queen Ethelburga's, scoring 88 for two in reply to 86 for eight.

School cricket retains links with former pupils. In July 2021, a combined Old Pocklingtonian and Pixies XI played the school first XI in memory of Malcolm Milne, a former pupil, teacher and long-serving Pixies secretary.

==== Hockey & Netball ====
Girls' hockey developed with full co-education in 1989. Teacher M. Newhouse's retrospective records East Riding championships for the under-14, under-15 and under-16 sides in 1991–92, and the under-15 team's progress to the last sixteen of the National Schools Competition in 1994–95. The first girls' hockey tour visited eastern Canada in 1995; synthetic pitches were developed in 2005.

The 2025–26 handbook places girls' hockey in the Michaelmas term and boys' hockey in the Lent term, with matches during games sessions and on Saturdays. The President's Cup fixture against Hymers College, originally a rugby competition, was extended to first-XI girls' hockey in 2024. Pocklington won the inaugural hockey match 3–2.

Netball was introduced as part of the girls' games programme following full co-education. Newhouse's account records an East Riding championship for the under-14 side in 1997–98, followed by an unbeaten senior season and victories in two local tournaments in 2002–03. The Foundation's annual report for the year ending 31 August 2024 records county performance and development pathway selections and an under-14 team's progression to county finals.

=== Tennis ===
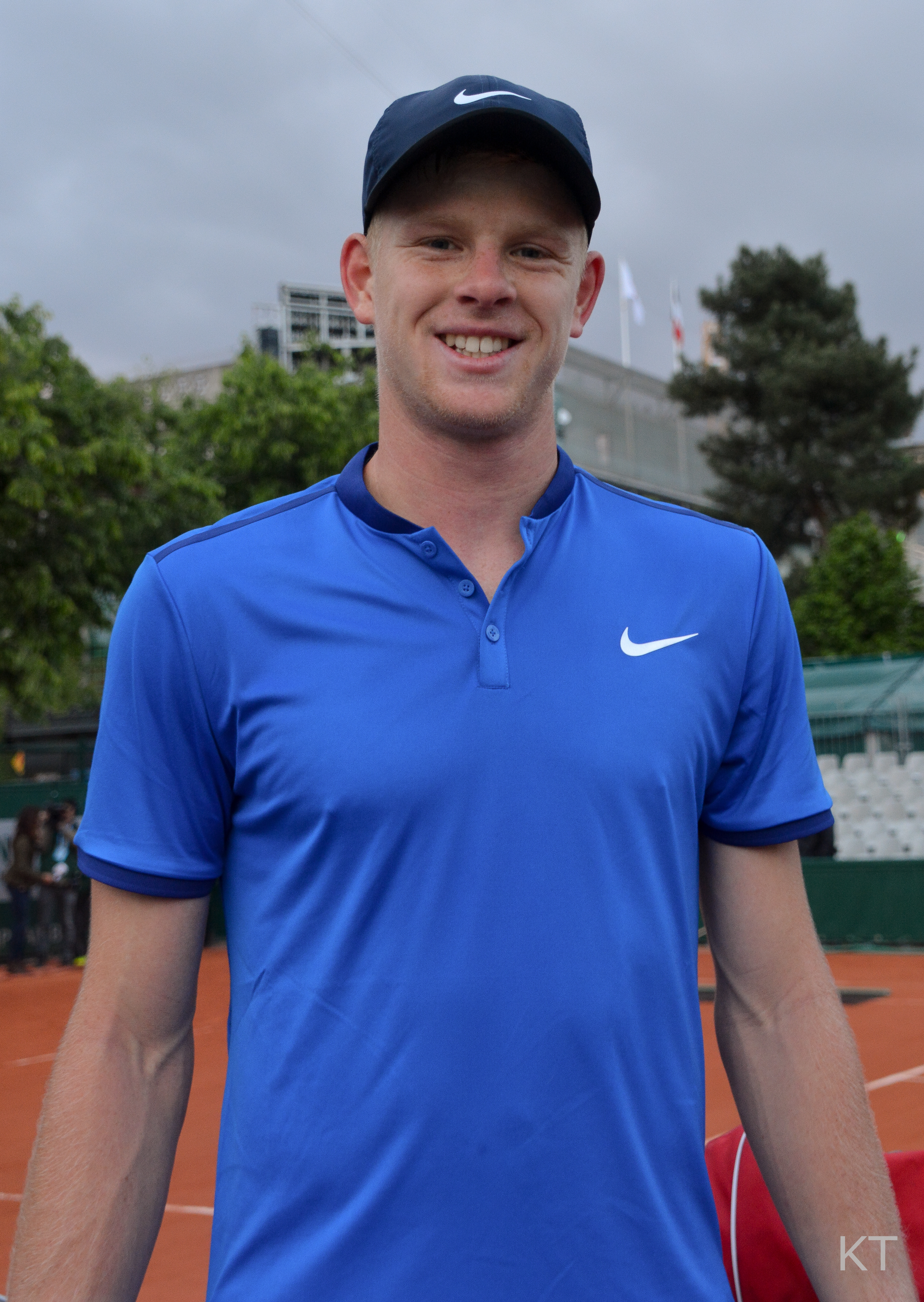
Kyle Edmund at the 2016 French Open.

Tennis is a summer sport, with boys', girls' and mixed fixtures and entries in Lawn Tennis Association competitions and the Independent Schools Tennis Association championships at Eton. Pocklington also hosts school tournaments; Queen Margaret's School's report of the under-13 girls' event in May 2025 records matches involving Pocklington, Ashville College, the Grammar School at Leeds, St Peter's and Hymers.

Pocklington won the Independent Schools Tennis Association's Phillips Cup for under-15 boys in 1996.

In 2026, Pocklington's under-15 girls' first pair reached the ISTA National Plate final at Eton, finishing runners-up to Marlborough College, who won 6–2, 7–5. The under-19 boys' team reached the Plate semi-finals after wins against Pangbourne College, New Hall School and Rugby School, before losing to Whitgift School.

Kyle Edmund, later a member of Britain's 2015 Davis Cup-winning team and an Australian Open semi-finalist, attended the Prep School from 2002 to 2006. A school account published in 2018 records that he won its tennis championship three times. Coach Trevor Loten recalled selecting Edmund, aged ten, for the under-12 Northern School Boys Championship, which he won with his partner. Edmund returned to the Prep School after the 2015 Davis Cup victory to meet pupils.

=== Fixtures and former-pupil sport ===
Pocklington's President's Cup against Hymers began as a first-XV rugby fixture in 2021, adding first-XI girls' hockey in 2024. The October 2024 meeting produced one victory for each school: Hymers won the rugby 21–3 and Pocklington won the hockey 3–2.

Former pupils also play the town rugby club in a Boxing Day fixture for the Bottomley Trophy. Cricket and tennis form part of the annual Old Pocklingtonian summer reunion. In 2026 the reunion included a school-versus-former-pupils cricket match and tennis for the Edmund-Loten Trophy.

== Other sports ==
=== Athletics and cross-country ===
Athletics is a summer games option, with track and field training, school fixtures and opportunities to enter English Schools competitions. The school also holds an annual sports day. Its sporting archives include accounts of nineteenth-century athletics: Walter Judkins won the senior 440 yards and long jump in 1893, as well as playing first-team football and some first-XI cricket.

In cross-country, the junior girls' team qualified for the English Schools' Athletic Association Cross Country Cup final in 2019. Two senior boys also qualified for the English Schools Cross Country Championships in the same academic year.

=== Equestrian sport ===
The school's equestrian team competes in National Schools Equestrian Association events. At the 2019 NSEA National Championships at Addington Manor, Pocklington won the 75 cm arena-eventing team title. Cranleigh's account of the championships records that its team finished on the same score, with Pocklington winning on the style mark.

In its account of the 2025 NSEA championships, the school reported a national title in combined training, comprising dressage and showjumping. Its 80 cm showjumping team also reached the jump-off and finished sixth of 38 teams.

=== Other activities ===
Other activities include clay-pigeon shooting, skiing and trampolining; the school enters trampolining teams in the Kingston League and National Schools competitions. The 2025–26 handbook also lists basketball, archery, football and table tennis, with golf fixtures played at the KP Club.

== Daily routine and worship ==
The Senior School operates on a two-week timetable alternating between Week A and Week B, with academic lessons from Monday to Friday. The school’s published routine follows a schedule of tutor time at 8.30 which may be followed by assembly from Monday to Thursday and church on Friday. Each day entails six lessons, with a midday break for lunch and activities; the teaching day ends at 3.50 pm; however many day pupils remain until 5.00 pm following an after-school programme.

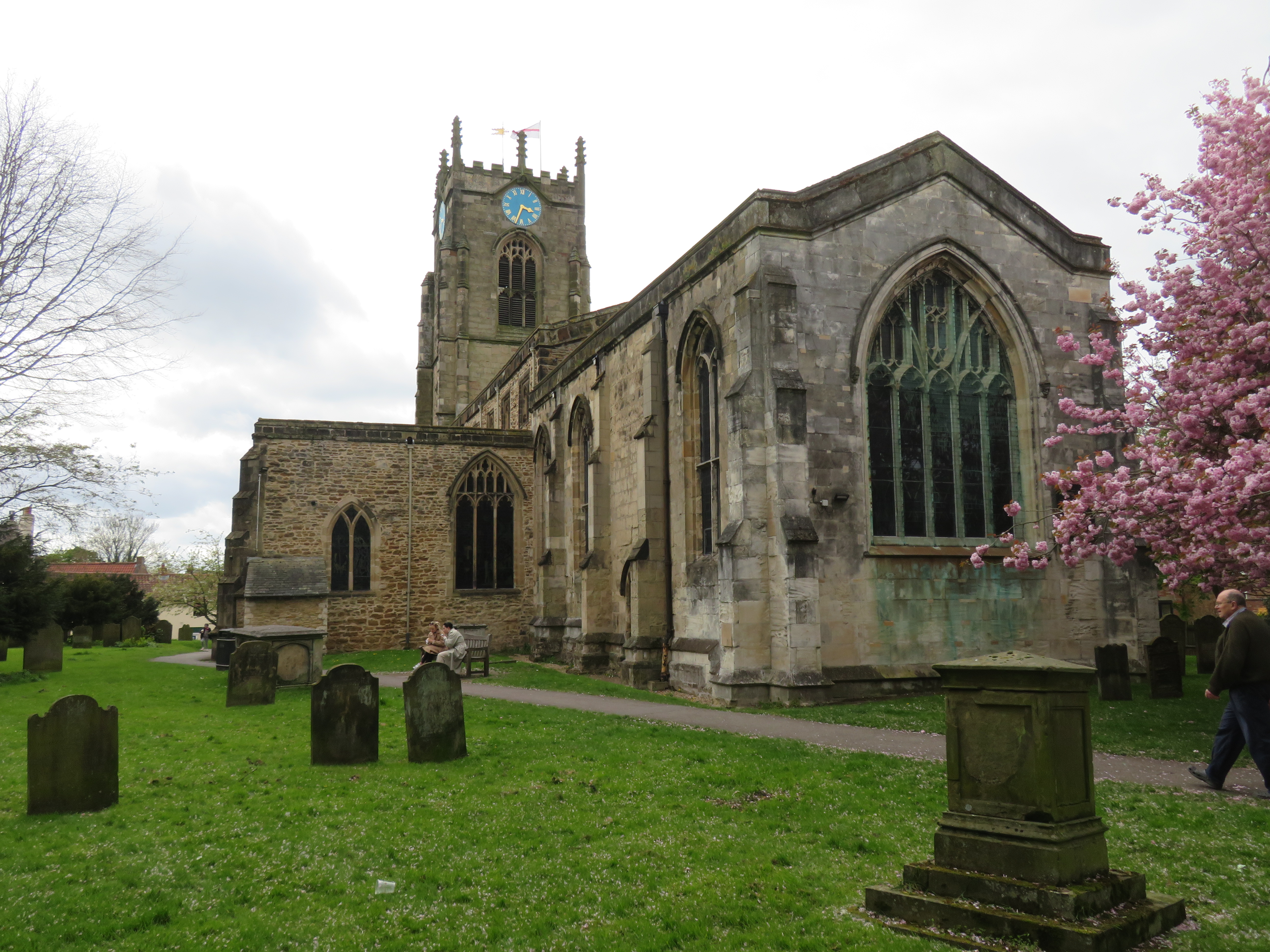
All Saints’ Church, Pocklington, in 2024.

The after-school programme follows the end of lessons at 3.50 pm. The school’s 2025–26 information requires Lower School day pupils remaining at school without an activity to attend supervised prep until 5.00 pm. The 2024 handbook allows Middle School and Sixth Form pupils to work or relax in their respective areas. Boarders have separate evening study and activities. Friday morning services take place at All Saints’ Church, Pocklington. The published timetable places church at 8.30 am and the first Friday lesson at 9.10 am, compared with 8.55 am on other weekdays. Pupils have daily contact with their tutors. In the Sixth Form, pastoral organisation combines tutors and day-house staff with boarding houseparents as well as a health and wellbeing service which includes nurses and counsellors.

The Commemoration of Benefactors includes prayers, music and a staff procession; the school’s account of the 2024 service links it to remembering those who had established and supported the foundation.

The school publishes an annual magazine, The Pocklingtonian, which is distributed around the October half-term, commonly to former pupils, staff, parents, and supporters.

The school archive has preserved issues of this magazine dating back to 1898-1907, which provides valuable information to the magazine’s early history. The school’s sports history records a rugby centenary in 1979–80, dating the school’s first rugby match to 1879.

== Houses ==
The Senior School has six houses: Dolman, Gruggen, Hutton, Wilberforce, Fenwick-Smith, and Faircote, two of which are exclusive to boarders - boarding pupils have a shared membership of both a day and boarding house. All pupils, including boarders, each belong to a day house and retain their membership as they progress through the school.

Each house is divided into three sections: Lower School, Middle School, and Sixth Form, each with housemasters and housemistresses, tutors, student captains and prefects providing academic and pastoral support. Over a pupil’s time at the school, they will move between the sections while remaining part of the same house. House activities include assemblies, individual tutorials, and house competitions in sport, music, drama and academic subjects.

In the Sixth Form, each house has four tutors, one of whom serves as housemaster or housemistress; tutor groups usually contain between ten and twelve students.

Senior House-tie stripe colours
Day houses
Dolman	Gruggen	Hutton	Wilberforce
Blue	Light blue	Dark red	Green
Boarding houses
Fenwick-Smith		Faircote	
Burnt orange		Purple	

Sixth Form students organise and produce their houses’ performances in the House Music and Drama competitions. Each house also participates in charitable fundraising. During Charity Week 2026, Dolman supported Inspire Children and Youth Trust, Gruggen supported The Brain Tumour Charity, Hutton supported the Marine Conservation Society and Wilberforce supported The People’s Pantry in Pocklington. The combined fundraising total was just under £5,500.

Boarding accommodation is organised separately from the day-house system. Boarders participate in day-house assemblies, competitions and activities, while boarding houseparents will oversee their residential welfare and communicate with day-house staff. The 2024 parent handbook listed Dolman House for boys in the First to Fourth Years and Orchard House for girls in those years, with Fenwick-Smith and Faircote accommodating boys and girls respectively from Fifth Year onwards.

The school’s boarding webpage, accessed in October 2026, describes boys and girls living in Fenwick-Smith and Faircote respectively, with junior boarders up to and including Year 10 (Fourth Year) using an evening hub known as The Hive @ Dolman. The hub provides space for supervised prep, recreation, reading, and organised activities.

The Prep School operates a separate six-house system comprising Byland, Fountains, Jervaulx and Rievaulx, named after Yorkshire abbeys and the boarding houses, Dolman and Orchard. Each pupil belongs to a house, and a house buddy scheme connects prep school children across year groups. Students earn rewards towards a House Merit Shield, which is presented each half-term, and participate in sporting and other house activities.

Boys' Sixth Form tie
Navy blue with green tree motifs
Prep School tie
Navy blue and light blue diagonal stripes

== Music and drama ==
=== Music ===
Music at Pocklington includes individual tuition, choral and instrumental ensembles, and public performances. The Independent Schools Inspectorate's 2013 report recorded regular overseas music tours and opportunities to perform in choirs and instrumental groups. The school's summer 2025 programme listed an orchestra, chamber choir, swing band, string, brass and woodwind groups, and a Lower School rock band, alongside seasonal concerts and a carol service.

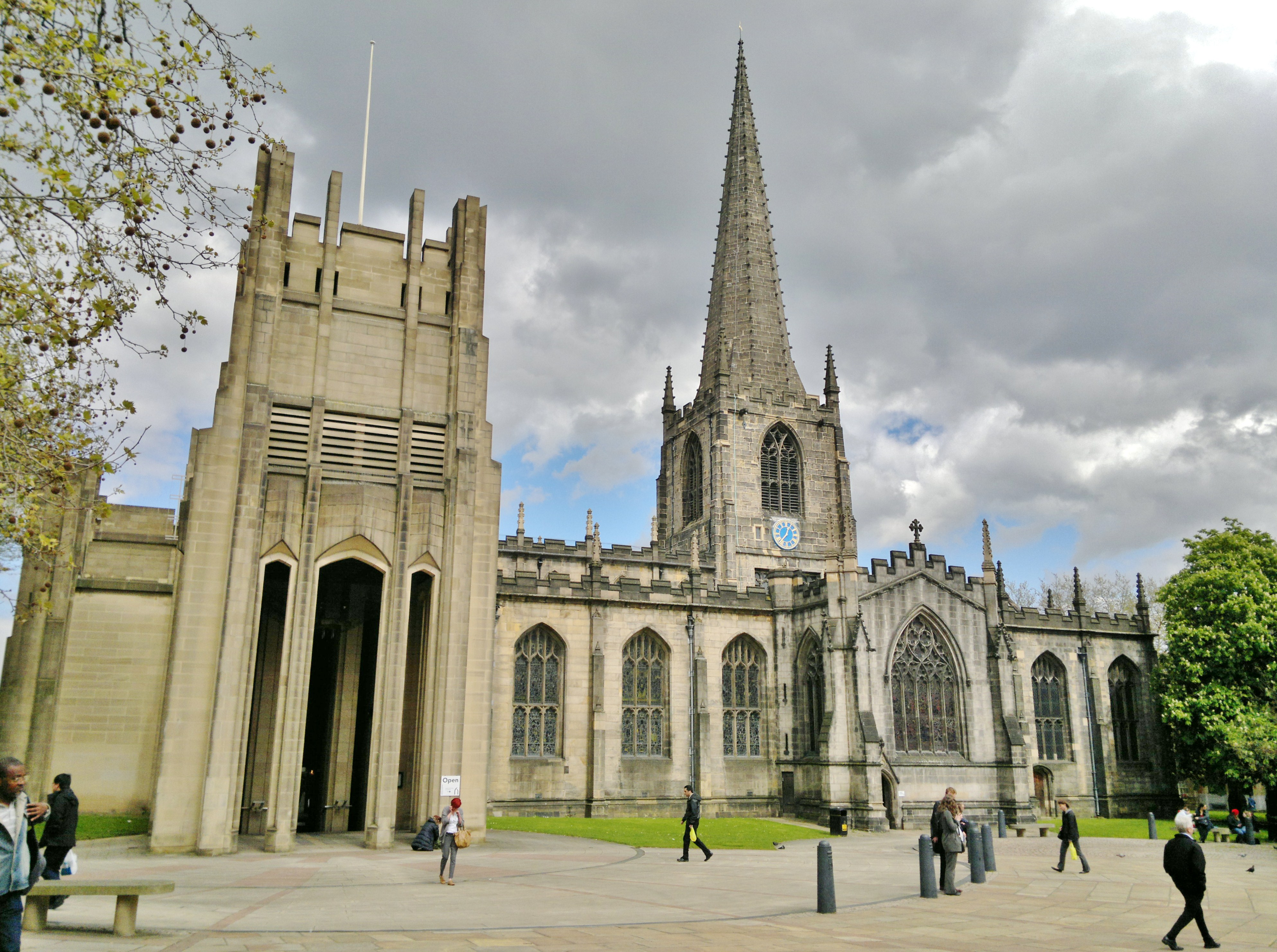
Cathedral Church of St Peter and St Paul, Sheffield

Pupils have performed at venues outside the school, including a March 2020 concert at Beverley Minster by the swing band, chamber choir, string group and soloists. On 6 July 2022, pupils from the Lower, Middle and Upper School gave a lunchtime recital at Sheffield Cathedral, with a programme including music by Fauré, Gershwin, Mozart and Chaminade. During the COVID-19 lockdown in 2020, the music department produced an online concert incorporating separately recorded performances by Senior and Prep School pupils.

The Silvestri Music Scholarships developed through collaboration between pianist Anda Anastasescu and David Gray, then head of Pocklington. The competition was launched in 1999 to enable Romanian teenage musicians to study in Britain. Alexandra Dariescu attended Pocklington on a one-year Silvestri scholarship from 2002. She later recalled that a teacher encouraged her to audition at the Royal Northern College of Music and paid her travel fare; the audition led to a scholarship for her conservatoire studies.

=== Drama ===
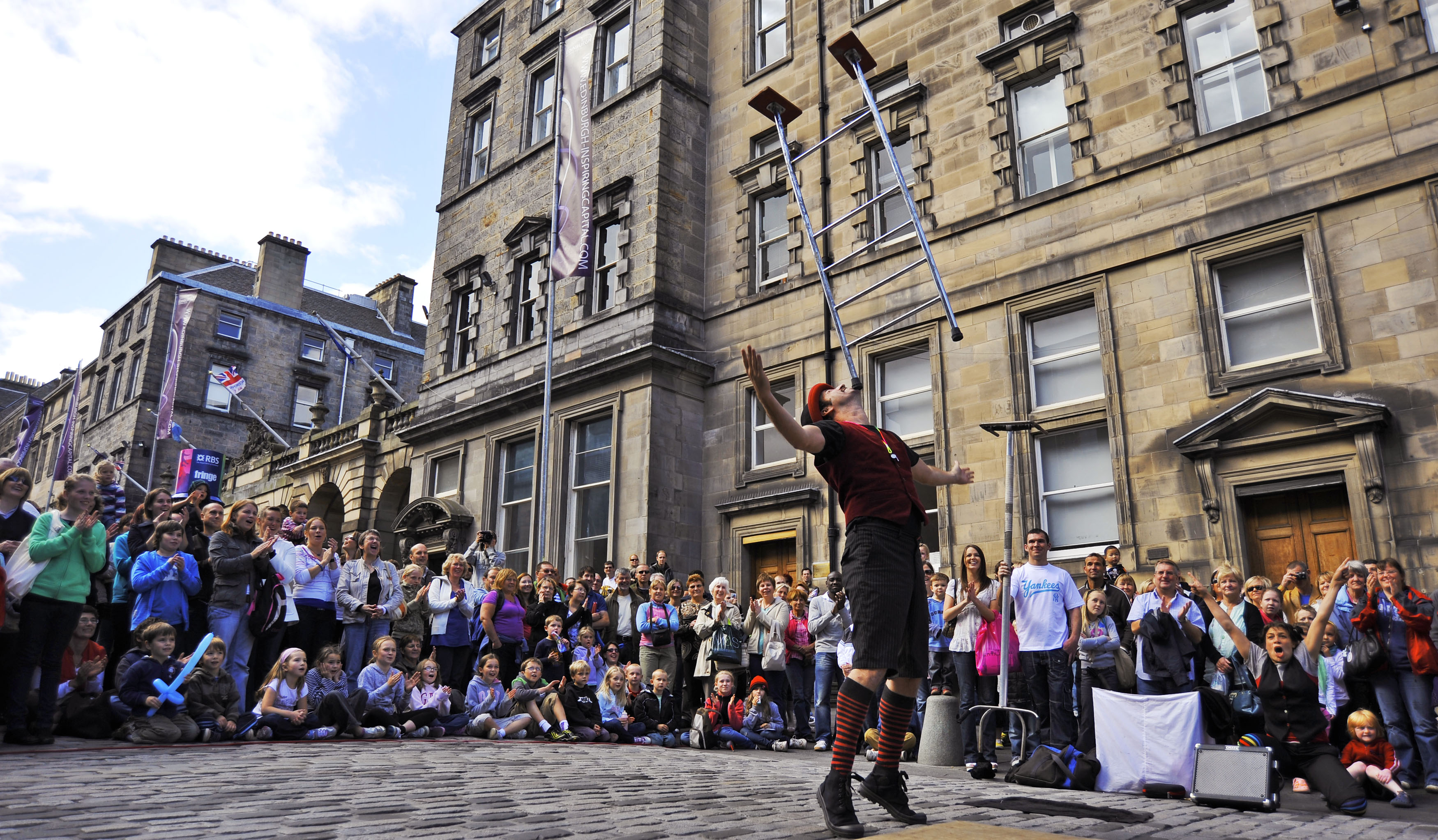
Edinburgh Fringe 037

The School Dramatic Society performed Virtute et Veritate (sed non semper), a pageant of the school's history written by Michael Stevenson, for the school's 450th anniversary in 1964. Its programme is held by East Riding Archives. The 2013 inspection recorded school productions, participation in the York Mystery Plays, productions taken to the Edinburgh Festival Fringe, and opportunities for pupils to work backstage.

Senior and junior productions are supported by technical theatre activities covering lighting, sound, scenery, costume and stage management. Sixth Form pupils organise their houses' entries in the House Music and Drama competitions, participating in production and performance.

=== York Mystery Plays ===
In a retrospective published by the York Mystery Plays organisers, Alan Heaven dated the school's involvement to a production of the cycle in its theatre in 2006. This was followed by a performance of the Potters' Pentecost pageant and, in 2010, a production for the Company of Merchant Adventurers. The plays' archive identifies the 2010 production as the Mercers' Pageant of the Last Judgement, directed by Heaven with music by Allison Bond. Ravens Morris joined the production in 2014 and took the leading role in 2018, while the school remained involved.

== Clubs and societies ==
The school's archive newsletter dates its first debating society to 1894 and describes a re-enactment in 2010 of a debate preserved in the school magazine. Its 2024 curriculum guide lists debating, chess, history and psychology societies, alongside creative and technical activities. The school's "POCK Challenge" encourages participation across physical, outreach, creative and knowledge-based activities.

=== Cadets and outdoor activities ===
The school's Combined Cadet Force has Army and Royal Air Force sections. Membership was compulsory in Year 10 at the time of the 2013 inspection, which recorded approximately 150 cadets. The school now describes membership from Year 10 as voluntary, with weekly meetings, field exercises, flying opportunities, camps and adventurous training. It also offers the Duke of Edinburgh's Award at Bronze, Silver and Gold levels.

== School buildings ==
The school buildings on West Green in 2015.

The Post Office Directory of 1857 attributes the start of rebuilding in 1818 to Shield, who pursued litigation over the school’s leases. It states that work on the school buildings and master’s house had remained incomplete until Gruggen was appointed in 1848, which the buildings were substantially refreshed under his supervision.

The nineteenth-century front of the school dates from 1851, and the bell-tower extension to 1898. Kelly’s 1933 directory describes the late-Victorian enlargement, including a gymnasium, chemistry provision and infirmary, followed by the 1898 wing. A swimming pool is also recorded to have been constructed in 1921, the purchase of Dolman House for boarders in 1923, new laboratories, classrooms and in 1932 an art room was opened by Lord Irwin.

Kelly’s directories date the assembly hall’s construction to 1927, however Ainscough’s later history contradicts this date with 1928. The 1932 Laboratories, classrooms and art rooms cost £7,500. Before the construction of the hall, the school had used the town’s Victoria Hall for functions. Architects Brierley Groom record a clock installed in 2013 following a historic Brierley design that was rediscovered in the Borthwick archives in 2006.

== Campus and facilities ==
The school is situated on a 50-acre campus on the edge of the Yorkshire Wolds at West Green, where the Senior School has been located since its inception. The estate houses dedicated teaching blocks, specialized co-educational boarding houses, and a range of performing arts, early years, and sporting infrastructure.

Pocklington School

=== Academic and performing arts buildings ===
Significant modern additions have shaped the academic layout. In May 2001, playwright and former pupil Sir Tom Stoppard opened the 300-seat Tom Stoppard Theatre, a facility designed to host both school performances and community events under the administration of the Pocklington School Performing Arts Centre Trust.

On 18 May 2018, Lord Halifax officially opened a £3 million Art and Design Technology Centre, completing a three-year fundraising initiative to provide north-facing, light-optimized studios and workshops for art, design, and photography.

Academic workspaces were further upgraded in September 2026 following a major structural and cosmetic redevelopment of the Sixth Form Centre. Completed in partnership with design specialists TS Booker, the project transformed the upper floor into a contemporary study zone featuring individual study pods, while the lower floor was reimagined as a collaborative workspace funded by a £100,000 capital investment.

=== Early years and literacy environments ===
Literacy and early-years environments have similarly seen targeted investment across the campus. In September 2021, the Pocklington Prep School library reopened following an extensive summer refurbishment executed by David Cliff Designs. The updated facility was configured to accommodate the school's Accelerated Reader scheme and was officially inaugurated by television correspondent and children's author Catherine Jacob, who performed a ribbon-cutting ceremony and an inaugural book reading for students.

Following this, in September 2025, the school expanded its early-years operations with the launch of Little Pips Nursery for children aged 0 to 4 years. The nursery occupies "The Hawthorns"—a building originally built to house the school's estates, joinery, and grounds maintenance teams—which underwent a complete physical refurbishment by Cooper Construction Services. Operating under a Reggio Emilia educational philosophy, the facility integrates four learning spaces, an indoor central piazza, a creative atelier, a parental rest space termed "The Pip Stop," and access to the wider campus's swimming facilities and woodland spinney for daily Forest School programming.

=== Boarding and sports infrastructure ===
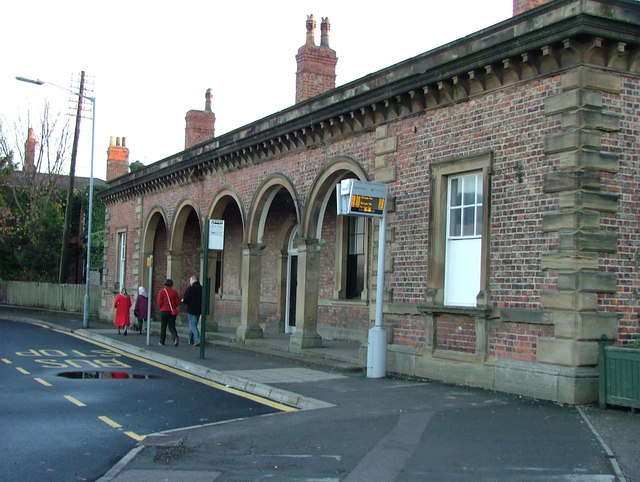
Spots hall

Residential facilities across the campus provide a total of 129 beds, which expanded significantly in 2007 with the construction of Fenwick-Smith House, a purpose-built senior boys' boarding facility funded by a gift from alumnus Brian Fenwick-Smith. The building provides 40 beds arranged across 27 rooms, comprising a mixture of single, double, and three-bed configurations featuring en-suite facilities, alongside dedicated study areas and exam preparation spaces.

The school's athletic facilities are anchored by 21 acres of grass pitches used for rugby, cricket, hockey, and football, alongside two full-size, sand-dressed synthetic surfaces. Indoor facilities include a heated swimming pool and a sports hall housed within the train shed of the former Grade II listed Pocklington railway station. Originally designed by George Townsend Andrews and opened in 1847, the station was acquired by the school in 1974, before being converted into a sports hall by architect and former pupil Arthur Quarmby.

== Coat of arms and motto ==
The Historic Coat of Arms Used by the Dolman family

Civic Heraldry of England and Wales identifies the arms displayed by Pocklington School as those of the Dolman family. The school’s 2019-20 annual magazine describes the redrawing of the coat of arms for communications and use of a wheatsheaf which was taken from the arms in the senior and preparatory schools’ identities.

The school’s motto, Virtute et Veritate, is translated as “with courage and truth” in L. G. Pine’s dictionary of mottoes

== Headmasters and mistresses ==
The following list contains historical masters and modern heads. Where complete dates are not established the table gives an attested year.

Robert Robertson, Head 1740–1749

George Keeton on the left (Head 1910–1914) with Edward, Prince of Wales (later Edward VIII) to the right.

Dates	Master or head
Named in 1517	Walter Carr
1552–1558	Adam Lockwood
1558–1581	Anthony Ellison
Late sixteenth century	Robert Fawcett
Late sixteenth century–1600	James Nelson
1600–1613	Martin Briggs
In post in 1616	Richard Elcock
Tenure ended in 1630	James Sotheby
1630–1650	Robert Sedgwick
1650–1657	Edward Llewellyn (also Lluellin)
Appointed in 1657	Rowland Greenwood
Succeeded Greenwood	John Clarke
1693–1698	Thomas Dwyer
Appointed 25 June 1698	Miles Farrer
Recorded in 1704	John Foulkes
In post in 1716	Christopher Lantrow
1717–1739	John Baker
1740–1749	Robert Robertson
1754–1807	Kingsman Baskett
1807–1848	Thomas Shield
1848–1872	Frederick James Gruggen
After Gruggen; in post in 1878–1879	Charles Gilmour Wilkinson
In post in 1889	Herbert London
1889–1910	Charles Frederick Hutton
1910–1914	George Haydn Keeton
1914–1944	Percy Cooper Sands
1945–1966	Robert St John Pitts-Tucker
1966–1980	Guy Longfield Willatt
In post by 1981; retired 1992	Anthony Derwent Pickering
1992–2000	David Gray
2000–2007	Nicholas Clements
2008–2018	Mark Ronan
January 2019–2025	Toby Seth
September 2025–present	Becky Lovelock

== Old Pocklingtonians and archives ==
Former pupils are known as Old Pocklingtonians. The Old Pocklingtonian Association dates its permanent organisation back to 1915. The association’s own account links its establishment to Sir Percy Simner and describes social and sporting events, careers advice and mentoring among its activities.

East Riding Archives holds the Pocklington School records under reference DDPS. The collection covers 1525–1972 and includes foundation and endowment documents, governors’ minutes, Charity Commission schemes, inspection reports, staff records, pupil registers, accounts and building records. Its catalogue identifies an early pupil register covering 1626–1717 and admissions records from 1908 to 1958. The collection’s early admissions register also contains school memoranda, accounts and a fundraising appeal catalogued provisionally to 1698. This includes Gruggen’s nineteenth-century compilation of earlier masters and ushers.

Building-related records include photographs and newspaper cuttings which concern the opening of new buildings by Lord Irwin in 1932.

A contemporary copy of the 1517 foundation charter came to light through a London book sale in 1908 and was later given to St John’s College, Cambridge. Gilbank’s account describes the rediscovery in 2009 and translation for the school’s quincentenary. The foundation documents were published with translations and introductions in 2014.

== Notable alumni ==
The school's alumni are known as "Old Pocklingtonians". This list contains former notable pupils of Pocklington School, grouped by profession and listed alphabetically by surname within each category.

=== Politics, diplomacy and business ===
William Wilberforce, politician and abolitionist, painted by Thomas Lawrence in 1828.

- Edward Clay, British diplomat and former High Commissioner to Kenya.
- Stewart Eldon, British ambassador to Ireland.
- Steve Hare, CEO & executive director of Sage Group Plc, non-executive director of Sainsbury's.
- Richard Leonard, politician.
- Sir William Leveson-Gower, 4th Baronet, politician.
- Stephen Maxwell, author and politician.
- Martin St Quinton, Founder of Azzurri Communications, owner & chairman of Gloucester Rugby.
- Sir George Stephen, solicitor, barrister and abolitionist, prominent in the British anti-slavery movement.
- Henry John Stephen legal writer, sergeant-at-law, author of Treatise on the Principles of Pleading in Civil Actions.
- Sir James Stephen, British colonial administrator and Permanent Under-Secretary of State for the Colonies, involved in the abolition of slavery.
- Daniel Sykes, whig politician and barrister, Member of Parliament.
- William Wilberforce, politician and anti-slavery campaigner.

=== Arts, entertainment and literature ===
Sir Tom Stoppard, playwright, in 1990.

- Matt Baker, television screenwriter, known for adapting European crime dramas for British television.
- Martin Crimp, playwright and translator, known for Attempts on Her Life and The City.
- Alexandra Dariescu, concert pianist, known for international performances and the multimedia production The Nutcracker and I.
- Adrian Edmondson, comedian, actor and writer, known for The Young Ones and Bottom.
- Charlie English, journalist and author, known for books on art, history and cultural heritage.
- Dudley Foster, stage and television actor, known for appearances in British television dramas.
- Sebastian Horsley, artist and writer, known for his autobiography Dandy in the Underworld.
- Ralph Ineson, film and television actor, known for The Office, The Witch and Game of Thrones.
- Eille Norwood, silent-film actor, best known for portraying Sherlock Holmes in the 1920s.
- Ronald Payne, journalist, foreign correspondent and author, specialising in espionage and international terrorism.
- Jonathan Quarmby, record producer and songwriter, known for working with internationally recognised recording artists.
- Alec Sabin, actor, journalist and broadcaster, known for his television and radio work.
- Robin Skelton, poet and literary scholar, co-founder of the literary journal The Malahat Review.
- Sir Tom Stoppard, playwright and screenwriter, known for Rosencrantz and Guildenstern Are Dead and Arcadia.
- Richard Vergette, playwright and actor, whose works include American Justice and Dancing Through the Shadows.
- Ollie Wride, singer-songwriter, known for his synthwave recordings and collaboration with FM-84.

=== Sport ===
Kyle Edmund competing at the 2019 Wimbledon Championships.

- Claude Anson, first-class cricketer who represented Yorkshire County Cricket Club.
- Scott Boswell, former professional cricketer who represented Leicestershire County Cricket Club.
- Patrick Briggs, cricketer, rugby union player and headmaster, who represented Cambridge University in first-class cricket.
- Kyle Edmund, professional tennis player, 2018 Australian Open semi-finalist and Davis Cup winner.
- Diccon Edwards, former rugby union and rugby league player, who later became a professional coach.
- Colin Johnson, first-class cricketer who represented Yorkshire County Cricket Club.
- Gerald Kirk, professional footballer who played in the Football League.
- Tom Loten, former professional cricketer who represented Yorkshire and Nottinghamshire.
- Ben McNamara, professional rugby league footballer who has played for Hull FC and Castleford Tigers.
- John Musgrave, first-class cricketer who represented Cambridge University.
- Michael Rose, former first-class cricketer who represented Cambridge University, Leicestershire and Marylebone Cricket Club.
- Frank Smailes, first-class cricketer who represented Yorkshire and played Test cricket for England.
- Jonathan Stuart, former professional rugby union player who represented Scotland A, Glasgow Warriors and Leicester Tigers.
- Rob Webber, former England international rugby union hooker who played for Wasps, Bath and Sale Sharks.

=== Military ===
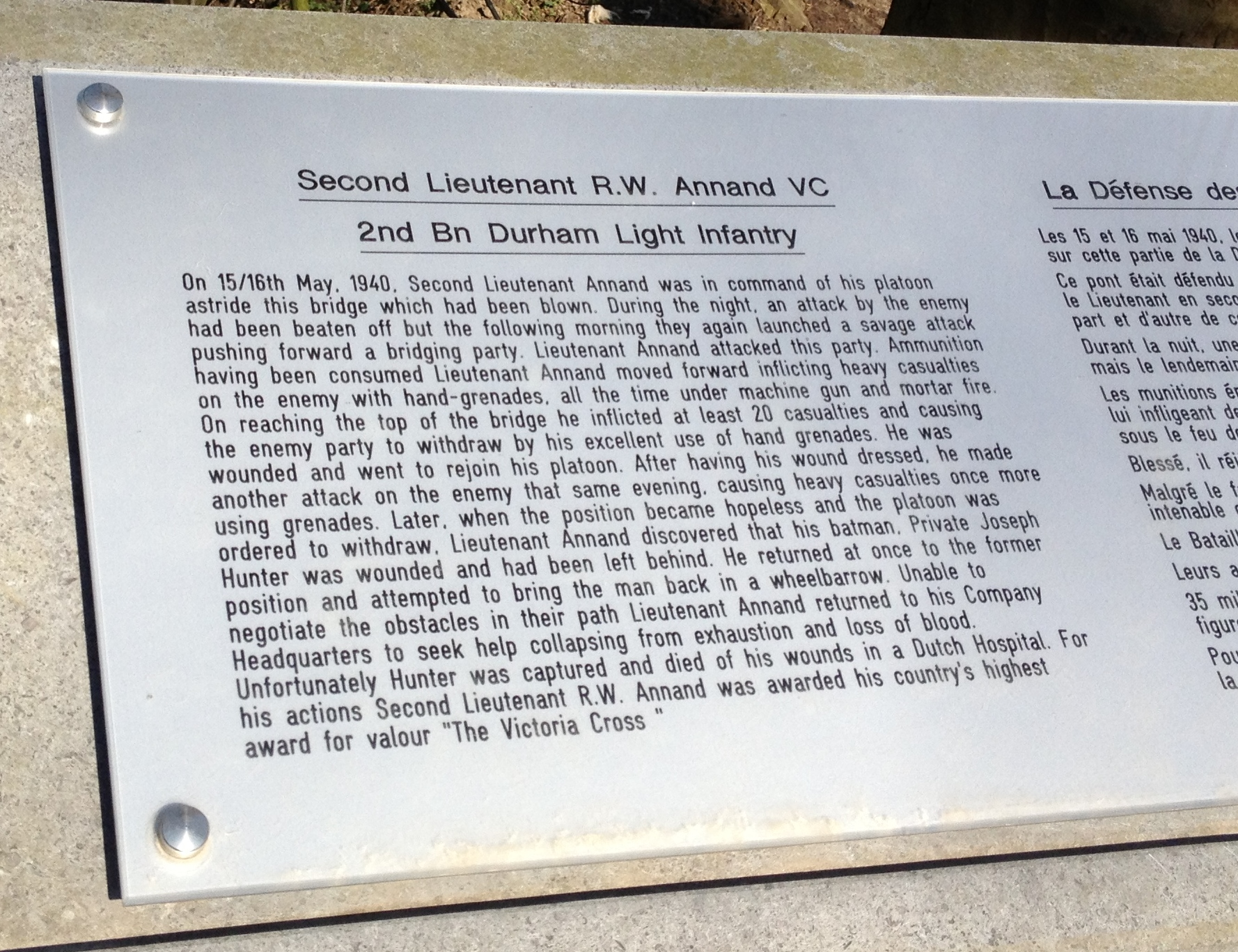
Memorial plaque commemorating Richard Annand VC at the River Dyle in Belgium.

- Richard Annand, British Army officer awarded the Victoria Cross for gallantry during the Second World War.
- Christopher Elliott, British Army major general who held senior military command and administrative appointments.
- Andrew Farquhar, senior British Army officer who held command appointments and served as a military administrator.
- Ronald Hamlyn, Royal Air Force fighter pilot and Battle of Britain veteran, awarded the Distinguished Flying Medal.
- Alec Ingle, Royal Air Force fighter pilot who served during the Battle of Britain.
- Jeff Rees, Royal Air Force squadron leader who served during the Second World War.
- Peter Walker, Royal Air Force air marshal and former director of NATO's Joint Warfare Centre.

=== Science, medicine and academia ===
Charles Wilson, 1st Baron Moran, physician to Winston Churchill, in the 1950s.

- Mark Child, theoretical chemist and former Coulson Professor of Theoretical Chemistry at the University of Oxford.
- Sir James Cobban, educationalist who served as headmaster of Abingdon School from 1947 to 1970.
- David H. French, archaeologist, known for his research into the archaeology of ancient Anatolia.
- Joseph Hill, seventeenth-century academic, clergyman and lexicographer, known for expanding Schrevelius's Greek–Latin lexicon.
- James Johnson, academic, Master of Sidney Sussex College and Vice-Chancellor of the University of Cambridge.
- Kenneth Arthur Pyefinch, zoologist and Fellow of the Royal Society of Edinburgh, specialising in marine biology.
- John Samuel Slater, civil engineer and academic, who served as principal of Bengal Engineering College in India.
- Alick Walker, palaeontologist, known for his research into fossil reptiles and the evolution of archosaurs.
- Francis James West, British-Australian historian and academic, former professor at Deakin University, specialising in colonial and Pacific history.
- Sir Dawson Williams, physician and medical editor, known for his long tenure as editor of the British Medical Journal.
- Charles Wilson, 1st Baron Moran, physician to Winston Churchill and author of The Anatomy of Courage.

=== Architecture, engineering and design ===
- T. J. Cobden-Sanderson, bookbinder, printer and Arts and Crafts designer, who co-founded the Doves Press.
- Thomas Cooke, scientific instrument maker and founder of T. Cooke & Sons, known for manufacturing astronomical telescopes.
- Mark Fisher, architect and stage designer, known for designing concert stages for Pink Floyd and the Rolling Stones.
- Ralph Hooper, aeronautical engineer, known for his role in developing the Hawker Siddeley Harrier aircraft.
- Roger Kohn, designer and author, whose work encompasses design and the visual arts.
- A. Michael Mennim, architect and author, known for his work on historic buildings and architectural conservation.
- Xavier Pick, artist and illustrator, known for his documentary drawings and travel-related artwork.
- Oswald Longstaff Prowde, civil engineer who worked on major engineering and infrastructure projects.

=== Religion ===
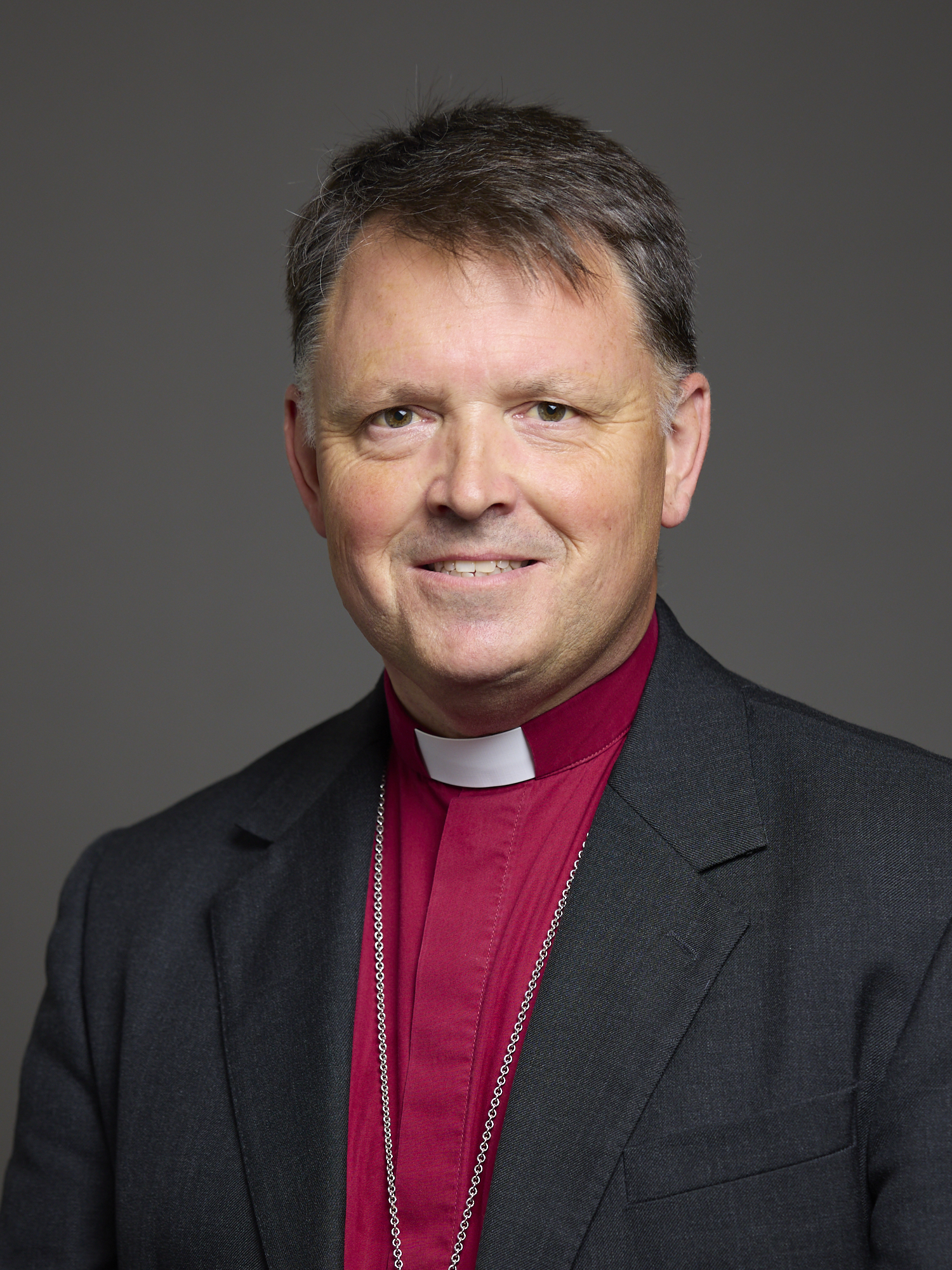
Graham Usher, Bishop of Norwich, in 2024.

- William Andleby, Roman Catholic priest and martyr, beatified by Pope Pius XI in 1929.
- Cecil Cooper, Anglican clergyman who served as Dean of Carlisle from 1933 to 1938.
- Samuel Drake, English Anglican clergyman and religious writer.
- Arthur Stuart Duncan-Jones, Anglican priest and writer, who served as Dean of Chichester.
- Edmund Hickeringill, seventeenth-century Anglican clergyman and author, known for his writings on religious controversy.
- John How, Scottish Episcopal clergyman who served as Bishop of Glasgow and Galloway.
- Paul Hughes, Anglican clergyman who served as Archdeacon of Bedford.
- Joseph Malet Lambert, Anglican priest and social reformer who served as Archdeacon of the East Riding.
- George Plaxton, Anglican clergyman and antiquarian, known for his historical and ecclesiastical research.
- Frank Swindell, Anglican clergyman who served as Archdeacon of Singapore from 1916 to 1929.
- Graham Usher, Anglican bishop, appointed Bishop of Norwich in 2019 after serving as Bishop of Dudley.
- Robert Wilkes, Anglican clergyman who served as Dean of Birmingham.
