= K. A. Pyefinch =

British zoologist and freshwater biologist

Kenneth Arthur Pyefinch, MA, FRSE (1911–1979) was a 20th-century British zoologist and freshwater biologist. As its first Officer in Charge, he led the development of the Brown Trout Research Laboratory in Pitlochry into its establishment as the Freshwater Fisheries Laboratory with a national and international reputation for research.

== Early life ==
Pyefinch was born in Kingston upon Hull on 10 January 1911, the elder child of Arthur Edward Hare Pyefinch (1877–1947). and Ellen Susannah (née Roberts). Pyefinch was educated at Hull Grammar School 1919 to 1924 then Pocklington School in Yorkshire 1924 to 1930.

== Education ==
Pyefinch won a place studying Natural Sciences at St John's College, University of Cambridge and graduated in 1934, being awarded the degree of MA in 1936.

== Career ==
From 1934 to 1942, Pyefinch lectured in Zoology at the University of Nottingham, being appointed Acting Head of the Zoology Department at the outbreak of the Second World War.

Over this period his interests were in the morphology of parasitic crustacea, particularly the Cirripedia and Ascothororacica. He spent some time studying marine ecology on Bardsey Island in North Wales; he identified two new species of Ascothororacica: Baccalaureus Maldivensis Pyefinch (1934) and Baccalaureus Nexapus Pyefinch (1936)

Initially part-time in 1942 and then full-time in 1943, he joined a team undertaking research for the Iron and Steel Institute (subsequently the British Iron and Steel Research Association) into the biology of marine organisms, the mechanisms of their attachment and methods used to assess the effectiveness of anti fouling paints – work of particular importance for naval vessels at that time. He became head of the anti fouling section of BISRA in 1946

In 1948, pursuing his interest in aquatic biology, he applied for and was appointed as Officer in Charge of the Brown Trout Research Scheme at Faskally in Pitlochry, a new joint venture between the Scottish Home Department and the North of Scotland Hydro Electric Board. This soon became the Brown Trout Research Laboratory and, in 1957, to reflect the changing nature of its work, the Freshwater Fisheries Laboratory. By 1958 the laboratory was sufficiently well established to come under the direct responsibility of the Scottish Home Department (subsequently Department of Agriculture and Fisheries for Scotland). During these 10 years, under his leadership, the laboratory had grown from 6 members of staff in temporary quarters in the gunroom at Faskally House to a workforce of 20 in purpose built and other accommodation. By the time he retired in 1973 staff numbered almost 60 and the importance of its work was widely recognised.

As head of the only freshwater laboratory in Scotland, he provided scientific background to the work of the Committee set up in 1962 chaired by Lord Hunter, to examine the state of Scottish salmon and trout fisheries. From 1957 he was involved in the work of the International Council for the Exploration of the Sea (ICES) representing Scotland on the Salmon and Trout Committee, chairing this committee (renamed the Andromous and Catadromous Fish Committee) 1970–1972 and serving from 1966 on the ICES/ICNAF Working Group (International Commission for the North West Atlantic Fisheries) investigating the effects of Greenland salmon fishing on home waters stocks.

Pyefinch also represented the interests of Scottish fisheries research on a number of bodies: as a member of the Fisheries Advisory Committee of the Development Commission (until it came to an end in 1964) as a member of the Freshwater Sub Committee of the Natural Environment Research Council from 1967 to 1970, as a member of the Council of the Freshwater Biological Association from 1951 to 1973.

Some of his publications are listed below. Particularly notable is Trout in Scotland, an account of the work of the first ten years of the work of the laboratory in Pitlochry (reviewed in the New Scientist June 1960). A Review of the Literature on the Biology of the Atlantic Salmon demonstrates his detailed knowledge of the general bibliography of Atlantic salmon; his enthusiastic acquisition of books and reprints contributed greatly to the development of the library at Faskally.

After he retired in 1974, he was appointed to the Buckland Professorship, taking as his subject the exploitation of salmon stocks

== Publications ==
- Pyefinch, K. A., The fresh and brackish waters of Bardsey Island North Wales: A chemical and faunistic survey. Journal of Animal Ecology 6. 115–137.
- Pyefinch, K. A., The intertidal ecology of Bardsey Island North Wales with special reference to the recolonisation of rock surfaces and the rock pool environment. Journal of Animal Ecology. 1943
- Pyefinch, K. A., and Mott, J.C., The sensitivity of barnacles and their larvae to copper and mercury. Journal of Experimental Biology, 25, 276–298. 1948
- Pyefinch K. A., Methods of identification of the larvae of Balanus balanoides (L.), B. crenatus Brug. and Verruca stroemia. Journal of Marine Biological Association of the United Kingdom. 1948
- Pyefinch K. A., Notes on the biology of Cirripedes. Journal of Marine Biological Association of the United Kingdom. 1948.
- Pyefinch K. A., The larval stages of Balanus crenatus Bruguière. Proceedings of the Zoological Society of London 1948.
- Pyefinch, K. A., and Downing, F. S., Notes on the general biology of Tubularia larynx Ellis and Solande. Journal of Marine Biological Association of the United Kingdom. 1949.
- Pyefinch, K. A., Short period fluctuations in the number of barnacle larvae with notes on comparison between pump and net plankton hauls. Journal of Marine Biological Association of the United Kingdom. 1949.
- Pyefinch, K. A., Notes on the ecology of ship fouling organisms. Journal of Animal Ecology. 1950.
- Pyefinch, K. A., Capture of the pre-grilse stage salmon. Scottish Naturalist. 1952.
- Pyefinch, K. A., A review of the literature on the biology of the Atlantic salmon. Freshwater and Salmon Fisheries Research Series 9 HMSO. 1955.
- Pyefinch, K.A., and Woodward, W. B. The movements of salmon tagged in the sea: Montrose, 1948, 1950, 1951. Scottish Home Department. 1955
- Pyefinch, K.A., Geographical variation in the Atlantic salmon. Nature. 1955
- Pyefinch, K. A., Trout in Scotland, a story of brown trout research at Pitlochry. HMSO. 1960
- Pyefinch, K. A., and Mills, D. H., Observations on the movement of Atlantic salmon in the River Conon and the River Meig Ross-shire. Freshwater and Salmon Fisheries Research. 1963.
- Pyefinch, K. A., and Elson, K. R., Salmon disease in Irish rivers. Scottish Fisheries Bulletin 26. 21–3. 1967.

== Personal life ==
Pyefinch took a keen interest in meteorology, railways and cricket.

In 1940, Pyefinch married Kate Madeleine Price, in Nottingham.

In 1950, Pyefinch married Agnes Elizabeth Sharp, botanist, in Perth. They have four daughters, Peggy, Barbara, Ann, and Sarah.

On 10 July 1979, Pyefinch died at his home in Pitlochry, Scotland. On 18 July 2010, Pyefinch's wife died.
