= Michael Rose (cricketer) =

English cricketer (born 1942)

Michael Harrison Rose (born 8 April 1942 in Hereford) is an English former cricketer active from 1963 to 1964 who played for Cambridge University(1962–1964), Leicestershire(1963–1964), and Marylebone Cricket Club (1964). Rose was educated at Pocklington School, where he was coached by Mike Stevenson. He appeared in 31 first-class matches as a right-handed batsman who scored 808 runs with a highest score of 86.
