= Claude Anson =

English cricketer

Claude Esmond Anson (14 October 1889 – 26 March 1969) was an English amateur cricketer, who played one first-class cricket match for Yorkshire County Cricket Club in 1924.

== Biography ==
Anson was born in Bradford, Yorkshire, He attended Pocklington Grammar School, a boarding school in the east Riding of Yorkshire. A right-handed opening batsman, he scored 14 and 13 and took a catch in the game against Derbyshire at Queen's Park, Chesterfield on 14, 16 and 17 June 1924. Opening the batting with Percy Holmes, Anson helped add 40 for the first wicket before falling in the unusual manner of hit wicket to Townsend for 14. Yorkshire went on to post 169 thanks to Holmes' 46. Derbyshire mustered just 74 in reply, and Yorkshire piled on the pressure with a second innings of 205, Anson again adding a useful 35 with Holmes. Anson also took a catch in the game. Derbyshire fought hard in their second innings, but were dismissed for 163 by Wilfred Rhodes and Macaulay to hand Yorkshire victory by 137 runs.

Despite this success, Anson never played for the county again, as Herbert Sutcliffe returned to reclaim his opening spot, and scored 213 in the next match against Somerset.

Anson died in March 1969 in Selby, Yorkshire, at the age of 79.
