= John Samuel Slater =

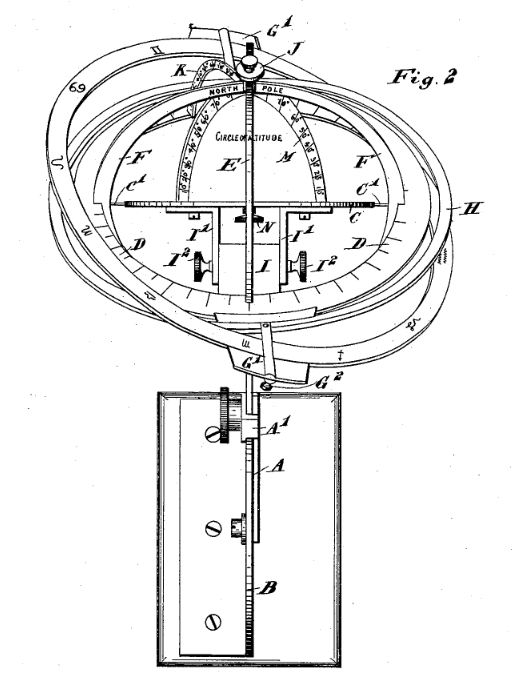
Slater's Armillary Sphere, US patent No 482,278

John Samuel Slater (born 1850 in Calcutta; died 1911 in Ealing) was a British professor of Civil Engineering at the Presidency College, Calcutta, and later principal of the Engineering College in Sibpur.

== Life and work ==
John Samuel Slater was educated at Pocklington Grammar School, and Bishop Cotton School, Simla. He graduated in 1870 at the Thomason Civil Engineering College, Roorkee, obtaining the gold medal for mathematics. The same year he was appointed to the Public Works Department of the Government of India and served at Dera Ghazi Khan and other locations in the Punjab.

In 1875, he was appointed Professor of Engineering at the Presidency College Calcutta, and in 1880, when the Engineering Department of that College was formed into an independent residential Engineering College at Sibpur, he took a leading part in its organisation, became one of the original members of its staff, and was eventually appointed Principal in 1891. He inaugurated a scheme of modern education for the District Schools of Bengal and Assam, and was responsible for the reorganisation of the technical schools of those two provinces. In 1897, he was for some months Inspector of Schools of the Rajshahi Division, and in 1901 officiated as head of the Educational Department of Bengal. In 1904, he was incapacitated by a serious illness which necessitated his retirement from India.

He was responsible for teaching astronomy to the students of the Engineering College, and was always keenly interested in that science. In 1891, while on leave, he devised and patented an armillary sphere. He presented this to the Royal Astronomical Society in 1891. which he used for instructional purposes.

After his retirement, he devoted himself enthusiastically to an investigation of the pollen of plants, and prepared by micro-photography a very large number of enlarged photographs of pollen grains. The value of his work in this direction was recognised by the botanical authorities at Kew.

== Family ==
He married in 1873 Jessie Frances, by whom he had a son and a daughter.

== Patents ==
- He didn't make the Armillary sphere. US patent No 482,278. Patented 6 September 1892.
