= Jeff Rees =

Jeff Rees in his Royal Air Force sergeant's uniform.

Squadron Leader William Jeffrey Rees DFC (21 May 1920 – 13 March 2015) carried out more than 60 operations for the Royal Air Force's Bomber Command during the Second World War. He twice flew damaged aircraft back to Britain and was awarded an immediate Distinguished Flying Cross and bar.

== Early life ==
Rees was born in Seaham and educated at Pocklington Grammar School.

== Second World War ==
Rees flew more than 60 operations for Bomber Command during the Second World War. He twice flew damaged aircraft back to Britain and was awarded an immediate Distinguished Flying Cross in 1941 for his actions in bringing a Wellington Bomber back after it was damaged by enemy action.

Later, when flying Mosquitos with 139 Squadron, he added a bar to his DFC when he successfully brought his aircraft back to England on one engine after it was hit by anti-aircraft fire. He subsequently became an instructor and then was seconded to BOAC on routes to the Near and Far East.

== Post-war career ==
Rees left the RAF in October 1946 and joined British South American Airways and then British Overseas Airways Corporation (BOAC) which became British Airways. By the time he retired from that company he was flying Boeing 747s. He finally retired after flying for Iraqi Airlines from Baghdad.
