= Scott Boswell =

English cricketer (born 1974)

Scott Anthony John Boswell (born 11 September 1974 in Fulford, York, North Yorkshire, England) is an English cricketer, who until his retirement specialised as a medium-fast bowler.

In his youth, Boswell played both cricket and rugby for the first team at Pocklington School and captained his house. After leaving school he attended the University of Wolverhampton, where a shoulder injury stopped him playing rugby. Boswell then went on to play first for Northamptonshire and then for Leicestershire before moving to club cricket.

He is most well known for bowling a 14 ball over in the 2001 C&G Trophy final against Somerset at Lord's, whilst playing for Leicestershire. Cricinfo rated this as the sixth worst over in history and The Observer rated him as the 9th biggest choker in the history of sport. In the semi-final, where Leicestershire defeated Lancashire, Boswell had taken four wickets for 44 runs, all of them England internationals.

Boswell currently coaches Stoughton and Thurnby in the Leicestershire Premier League and plays for Kibworth. He also coaches at Loughborough University and started his teaching career at the Beauchamp College, in Oadby, Leicestershire, where he also coached the school's cricket teams and the sixth form rugby team. He was the Director of Cricket at Nottingham High School until 2011 and is currently Head of Cricket at Trent College, Nottinghamshire.

Scott recently made his return to Lord's as a player, fielding for several overs as twelfth man during Kibworth Cricket Club's rain-abandoned 2008 Cockspur Cup final match.
