= Noel Davies =

British businessman

Sir Charles Noel Davies (2 December 1933 – 10 February 2015) was a British businessman who was chief executive of Vickers Shipbuilding & Engineering Ltd (VSEL) from 1989 to 1995 during the period when the yard built the Vanguard-class submarines that replacing the former Polaris fleet. The Vanguards were armed with Trident missiles.

Son of Henry and Vera Davies, he was born at Caeguision, near Oswestry into this Shropshire farming family. Davies was educated at Ellesmere College 1940 -1950, and started his career at the Austin motor company at Longbridge, going on to Vickers in Barrow and then the Atomic Energy Authority at Harwell. For two years he was chief engineer at the Dounreay nuclear power station in Caithness.

Davies was President of the Engineers Employers Federation in 1966 and was knighted the same year.
