= John Dolman =

English clergyman

John Dolman, Dowman or Dowlman (died 1526) was an English clergyman and benefactor.

The Historic Coat of Arms Used by the Dolman family

John Dolman was the son of William Dowman of Pocklington in the East Riding of Yorkshire. He was educated at the University of Cambridge, graduating B.Civ.L. in 1488 and D.Civ.L. in 1494. From 1507 until his death he was archdeacon of Suffolk. He established Pocklington Grammar School —now Pocklington School — in 1514, and founded five scholarships and nine sizarships at St John’s College, Cambridge. He also founded a chantry for two priests in St Paul’s Cathedral.

Will dated 8 November 1526, to be buried in the chapel of St Catharine, on the south side of the cathedral of St Paul, against the pavement under the altar there, by him made.

He bore: Azure, on a fesse dancettee between 8 garbs or, birds close on the field, beaked and membered gules. Crest: On a bezant a bird as in the arms.
