= Christopher Leslie Elliott =

British Army officer and author

Major General Christopher Elliott CB MBE
- Born: 18 March 1947 (age 79)
- Military career
- Allegiance: British
- Branch: Army
- Service years: 1967–2002
- Rank: Major General
- Unit: Royal Engineers

Major General Christopher Leslie Elliott CB MBE (born 18 March 1947) is a retired senior British Army Officer and author.

Elliott is the son of Peter Archibald Elliott, a civil engineer, and Evelyn Sarah (née Wallace). He was educated at Pocklington School, the Royal Military Academy Sandhurst and the Royal Military College of Science, Shrivenham, where he earned a bachelor's degree in engineering.

== Military career ==
Elliott was commissioned into the Royal Engineers in 1967, became a lieutenant in 1969, Captain in 1973, and Major in 1979. In 1969 he was created a Member of the Order of British Empire for Gallantry, following an incident in which he was instrumental in rescuing an injured man whilst climbing on Mont Blanc.

Elliott commanded 48 Field Squadron Royal Engineers from 1980. He was made a Lieutenant-Colonel in 1984 and a Colonel in 1989. He commanded 21 Engineer Regiment (1986–88) and the 6th Armoured Brigade (1990–91) as part of the British Army of the Rhine. His military staff appointments included Assistant Chief of Staff 1st British Corps (1988–90), Director of Studies at the Staff College, Camberley (1991–92), Director of the UK Higher Command and Staff Course, and the Director of Military Operations in the Ministry of Defence (1993–95).

Elliott studied as a Defence Fellow at University of Southampton in 1986, leading to the award of Master of Philosophy from Cranfield University. His work, in collaboration with Professor Geoffrey Mays and Dr. Peter Smith, investigated the impact of terrorist explosive attacks on domestic and commercial buildings and suggested structural arrangements to protect against their worst effects. As a result of this work, the Institution of Civil Engineers formed a Working Party—including Elliott— which led to changes to UK Building Regulations to improve building safety in the event of a blast. In 1995, he contributed a chapter to the book "Blast effects on buildings: design of buildings to optimize resistance to blast loading". The same year Elliott was promoted to the rank of acting Major General and was appointed Military Advisor to Carl Bildt, Chairman of the International Conference on the Former Yugoslavia, playing a part in the Dayton Agreement for Peace in Bosnia and Herzegovina. On his substantive promotion to Major General in January 1996, Elliott was made Director General and Chief Executive of the newly formed UK Army Training and Recruiting Agency, with a remit to retain more recruits, including changing the historic culture of training to one more effective given the changes in gender, race, educational and social backgrounds of those enlisting. After three years he was created a Companion of the Most Honourable Order of the Bath. He then served as Chief of Staff to the Quartermaster General from 1999 to 2000, and ended his military career as the UK Director General of Doctrine and Development, retiring from active service in 2002. For his last six years of service he was a Commissioner of the Royal Hospital, Chelsea.

== Later life ==
On leaving military service, Elliott was appointed a director of General Dynamics UK (2002–2010) and a consultant for Ove Arup and Partners (2002–12). He was a visiting professor to Cranfield University from 2002 to 2015. Elliott served as colonel commandant of the Corps of Royal Engineers from 2000 to 2008, President of the Institution of Royal Engineers from 2002 to 2007 and was a member of the Royal United Services Institute Acquisition Forum examining defence procurement. He was President of Victim Support Wiltshire, an independent charity supporting the victims of crime, from 2003 to 2009. Whilst some sources state that Elliott co-founded and chaired Purple Secure Systems Ltd, an IT consultancy from 2006 to 2009, Companies House records indicate he served as a director from 16 February 2007 to 24 April 2009.

In 2012 Elliott enrolled as a Research Fellow in the Changing Character of Warfare Programme in the Faculty of History of the University of Oxford, studying under Professor Sir Hew Strachan. At the same time, he was admitted as a Research Fellow at the School of Politics and International Relations at the University of Reading and appointed an Associate Fellow of the Royal United Services Institute. His studies led to the publication of "High Command" which examined the performance of the UK's High Command during the Iraq and Afghanistan Wars from 2000 to 2010. Elliott concluded that the Service Chiefs had been set at odds by the Ministry of Defence structure, making them almost rivals, with responsibility diffuse and authority ambiguous; that the UK High Command fell into the trap of doing just enough to satisfy the demands of the hour, but never enough to deliver strategic success. The result was that in two wars success on the battlefield had eluded them, but still at great cost in lives and money. The book was positively reviewed, and won the Society for Army Historical Research's Templer Best First Book Award in 2015. He has since lectured on the subject.

Eliott enjoys sailing and paragliding. He was Commodore of the Royal Engineer Yacht Club (1995–96) and the Army Sailing Association (2000–02). and President of the Joint Services Paragliding and Hang Gliding Association (1993–2002). He is a Fellow of the Institution of Royal Engineers. He was elected as a Parish Councillor of Easton Royal from 2003 to 2017.

He married Margaret Bennett in 1970, with whom he had two daughters, one of whom has predeceased him.

== Publications and papers ==
- "The Protection of Buildings Against Terrorism And Disorder". Proceedings of Institution of Civil Engineers 1992, 94, Paper 9930.
- "Blast Effects on Buildings" 1995 (chapter) Thomas Telford Publications. ISBN 0 7277 2030 9. Second Edition, 2009.
- "The Impact of the Media on the Prosecution of Contemporary Warfare" – British Army Review 1992.
- "Terrorism – Why Do Buildings Collapse?" RUSI Security Monitor 2 Dec/3 Jan Vol 1 No 5.
- "Preventing Terrorist Attacks on Buildings" RUSI Homeland Security and Resilience Monitor Nov 2003 Vol 2 No 8.
- "Towards Decision Superiority – The n-legged Spider Diagram" RUSI Journal Vol 148 No 6 Dec 2003.
- "Command and Control in the Information age. Evolution or Revolution?" RUSI Defence Systems Spring 2005
- "Acquisition Issues: The New MoD Partnering Handbook – Fit for Purpose?" RUSI Defence Systems Feb 2009
- Review of "Desperate Glory" Sam Kiley Bloomsbury 2009. pp. 106–7 RUSI Journal Vol 154 No 6. Dec 2009
- "High Command – British Military Leadership in the Iraq and Afghanistan Wars". Hurst, London 2015. ISBN 9781849044608. Paperback edition 2017.
- "The Chilcot Report: Early Thoughts on Military Matters." RUSI Journal 29 Sept 2016 Vol 161 No 4
