= Reginald Ryder =

English cricketer (1875–1923)

Personal information
- Full name: Reginald Talbot Ryder
- Born: 18 June 1875; Monks Coppenhall. Cheshire, England
- Died: 6 November 1923 (aged 48); Stockport, Cheshire, England

Domestic team information
- Years: Team
- 1903: Derbyshire
- Only FC: 20 August 1903 Derbyshire v London County

Career statistics
Competition	First-class
Matches	1
Runs scored	10
Batting average	10.00
100s/50s	0/0
Top score	10
Catches/stumpings	1/–
- Source: CricketArchive, June 2012

Reginald Talbot Ryder (18 June 1875 – 6 November 1923) was an English cricketer who played for Derbyshire in 1903.

Ryder was born in Monks Coppenhall, Cheshire, the son of William C Ryder and his wife Octavia. His father was a general draper. He was educated at Ellesmere College, Shropshire 8 September 1884 to 26 April 1886. Ryder played for Derbyshire in one first-class match during the 1903 season, against London County. He took a catch and was bowled for 10 in the first innings of the match in the upper order, but Derbyshire had won in the second innings before he was called in to bat.

On the Census for 1901 and 1911 he was a Schoolmaster for the Hutton Trust Secondary School, Preston.

Ryder died in Stockport at the age of 48 and is buried in Reddish Willow Grove Cemetery, Stockport.
