= Frederick Gruggen =

English educationalist, cricketer, and clergyman

Frederick James Gruggen (1820 – 30 March 1872) was an English educationalist and a first-class cricketer who played for Cambridge University in four matches in 1844 and 1845. He was born at Chichester, West Sussex, though the exact date of birth is not known, and he died at Liverpool.

In his four first-class cricket matches, two each in the 1844 and 1845 seasons, Gruggen batted as an opening or middle order batsman; he took seven catches in his four games, though he does not appear to have kept wicket.

== Background and later life ==
Gruggen was educated at St John's College, Cambridge. He was academically successful, winning the Hulsean prize for a dissertation, and was the sixth Wrangler when he graduated, later becoming a fellow of his college. He was ordained as a Church of England clergyman after graduation and from 1848 to his sudden death in 1872 he was the headmaster of Pocklington Grammar School in East Yorkshire, where one of the school houses still bears his name.
