= James Johnson (academic) =

James Johnson (1640-1704) was an academic in the last decades of the 17th century and the first of the 18th.

Johnson was born in Rise, Yorkshire, and educated at Pocklington School. He entered Sidney Sussex College, Cambridge in 1655. He graduated B.A. in 1659, M.A. in 1662 and B.D. in 1669. He was a Fellow of Sidney from 1662 to 1688; and its Master from then until his death in January 1704. His predecessor as Master, Joshua Basset, a Catholic convert, had abandoned his post during the Glorious Revolution. Johnson was Vice Chancellor of the University of Cambridge from 1689 to 1690.
