= Frank Swindell =

English Archdeacon (1874–1975)

Frank Guthrie Swindell, MA (18 December 1874 – 22 December 1975) was Archdeacon of Singapore from 1916 until his retirement in 1929.

Swindell was educated at Pocklington School, Ellesmere College (1887–1890) and St Catharine's College, Cambridge; and ordained in 1899. After a curacy in Boxley, he went out to the Far East. He was Chaplain at Selangor, Kuala Lumpur, Malacca and Negri Sembilan. In 1910 he married Gladys Dorothy Page at St Andrew's Cathedral, Singapore, the service was conducted by the Right Reverend Charles James Ferguson-Davie the Bishop of Singapore. Swindell himself became its Colonial Chaplain from 1914 until 1929. On his return from service overseas he was Rector of Isfield. He died in 1975 aged 101 years.
