= Ellesmere College =

Private school in Shropshire, England

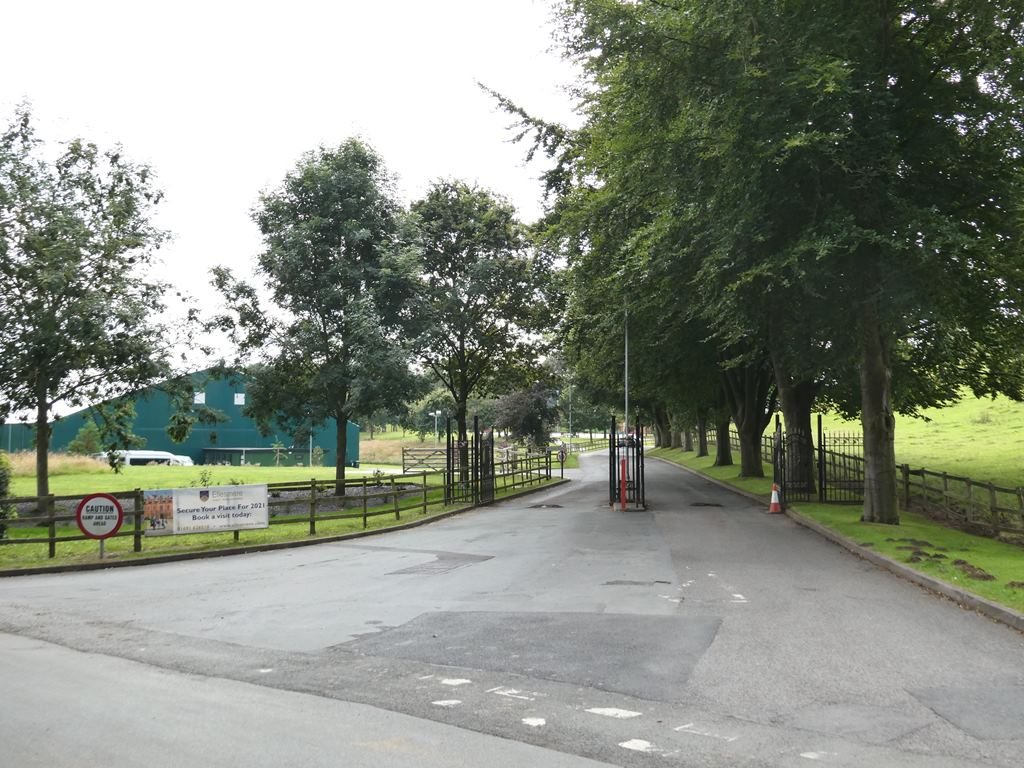
- Entrance to Ellemere College

Location
- Ellesmere, Shropshire, SY12 9AB; England; 52.89522°N 2.89189°W

Information
- Type: Private school Boarding school Day School
- Motto: Latin: "Pro Patria Dimicans" (Striving for one's country)
- Religious affiliation: Church of England
- Established: 1879
- Founder: Canon Nathaniel Woodard
- Local authority: Shropshire
- Department for Education URN: 123600 Tables
- Gender: Coeducational
- Age: 7 to 18
- Enrolment: 518
- Song: Jerusalem
- Publication: The Ellesmerian
- Website: http://www.ellesmere.com

Ellesmere College is a co-educational boarding and day school in the English public school tradition located in Shropshire, near the market town of Ellesmere. Belonging to the Woodard Corporation, it was founded in 1884 by Canon Nathaniel Woodard.

The Woodard Corporation is an Anglican educational charity which educates over 30,000 pupils across academy, private, and state-maintained schools.

The College consists of a Lower School (Years 3–8), a Middle School (Years 9–11) and a Sixth Form (Year 12–13) with A-Level, BTEC, and International Baccalaureate subjects.

== History ==
The College was founded in 1879 by Canon Nathaniel Woodard as a boys' school in association with the Church of England, with the 114-acre (46-hectare) land being provided by Lord Brownlow. Originally called St. Oswald's School, the building was designed by Richard Carpenter and Benjamin Ingelow, and the College opened on 5 August 1884 with 70 boys and four masters. The College-based itself on Anglo-Catholic values within a traditional public school framework, with the aim of providing education at a low cost for the sons of families with limited finances.

Despite the school's Christian foundation, there was no permanent chapel until 1926, and a temporary chapel operated in the crypt beneath the dining hall. In 1926, an official chapel was designed by Sir Aston Webb, but only the first portion was built in 1928. Modified plans were then drawn up in 1932 by Sir Charles Nicholson, and the building was completed in 1959. In 1966, the newly completed chapel and dining hall were then destroyed by a fire. They were both reopened in 1969, and building work continued at the College throughout the 1970s, including new classrooms and additional boarding accommodation.

During World War II, the College stored a number of notable paintings from the Walker Art Gallery including Dante's Dream. Additionally, in 1978, the College became the location for the filming of Absolution, starring Richard Burton and was also the first film role for Billy Connolly, though the chapel scenes were filmed at Pinewood and Bradfield College.

Since 1980, the College has been home to a Schulze Organ, originally installed at St Mary's Parish Church, Tyne Dock.

== Boarding ==
The school has seven boarding houses. There are two boarding houses dedicated to Middle School boys; St. Cuthbert's and St. Patrick's. St. Aidan's is a boarding house for Middle School girls. There are two Sixth Form boys boarding houses; St. Bede's and St. Luke's. St. Oswald's & St. Hilda's are both Sixth Form girls boarding houses.

Additionally, there are four competitive houses, Meynell, Talbot, Wakeman-Lambart and Woodard, all named after original family benefactors of the school. These compete in sport, music, debating and drama, among others.

== Sport ==
Ellesmere College has been recognised as an Athlete Friendly Education Centre (AFEC) by the World Academy of Sport (WAoS) in recognition of the way it helps student-athletes on the International Baccalaureate course balance sport and education as they follow an athletic pathway concurrently with their studies. Ellesmere College is one of only 22 schools in the world to receive this accreditation.

== Headmasters ==
- J. Bullock (1884 – 1890)
- J. Harrison (1890 – 1894)
- J. Beviss Thompson (1894 – 1903)
- E. Illiff Robson (1903 – 1907)
- H. Woolsey (1907 – 1910)
- T.H. Hedworth (1910 – 1927)
- A.V. Billen (1927 – 1935)
- R.A. Evans-Prosser (1935 – 1961)
- I.D.S. Beer (1961 – 1969)
- D.J. Skipper (1969 – 1982)
- F.E. Maidment (1982 – 1988)
- D.R. Du Cros (1988 – 1996)
- B.J. Wignall (1996 – 2024)

Ellesmere College's last headmaster, Mr. Brendan Wignall, was recognised in National Awards, being named one of the UK's best leaders of a public school, and was shortlisted in the best Headmaster category at the Tatler School Awards 2017.

== Notable Old Ellesmerians ==
- Martin Aitchison – Illustrator of over 70 Ladybird Books
- Freya Anderson, freestyle swimmer and Olympic gold medalist
- Bill Beaumont – Chair of World Rugby and Captain of the British Lions
- Ralph Benjamin – NATO scientist and member of Defence Scientific Advisory Council
- John Brunt – World War II recipient of the Victoria Cross
- Michael Chapman – Archdeacon of Northampton
- Noel Davies – Chief Executive of Vickers Shipbuilding & Engineering Ltd
- Paul Dean, Baron Dean of Harptree – Conservative Member of Parliament
- Robert Godwin – author
- Lady Edwina Grosvenor – prison reformer and founder of The Clink Restaurants
- Hugh Grosvenor, 7th Duke of Westminster
- Frederick Harvey – Ireland rugby player and World War I recipient of the Victoria Cross
- Chris Hawkins – DJ, television and radio presenter and reporter
- David Henderson – Chief Economist, OECD.
- Guy Home – Cricketer
- Michael Howard – Musician
- Peter Jones – actor, broadcaster and screenwriter
- Elfric Wells Chalmers Kearney – Australian inventor and railway engineer
- Mark Keyworth – rugby player
- James King – rugby player
- Dave Manby – slalom canoeist
- Peter McEnery – actor
- Chris Moncrieff – journalist
- Grenville Morris – footballer
- Marty Natalegawa – Indonesian Minister of Foreign Affairs
- Dewi Penrhyn Jones – professional cricketer
- Reginald Ryder – professional cricketer
- Frank Swindell – Archdeacon of Singapore
- Huw Thomas – broadcaster, ITN newscaster, barrister and Liberal Party politician
- Harry Herbert Trusted – British Colonial Attorney-General and Chief Justice
