= Francis James West =

British historian

Francis James West FAHA (26 June 1927 – 2 February 2025) was a British-Australian historian who began his career in England as a historian of Norman rule, he came to be known for his research into what he called 'alien rule' in the colonial territories of the South Pacific. He held senior academic posts in the United Kingdom, New Zealand and Australia, concluding his career as professor of history and government and pro vice-chancellor (research and development) at Deakin University in Victoria.

== Early life and education ==
West was born in Hull, England, on 26 June 1927 to George Henry West and Florence Caroline West (née Selby). He attended Hymers College in Hull from 1938 to 1944 on an East Riding scholarship; during World War II, he was evacuated to Pocklington School.

He studied history at the University of Leeds on a Mirfield scholarship. There, he studied under David C. Douglas, a historian of Norman rule, and John Le Patourel, a historian of the Middle Ages. West graduated and subsequently enrolled as a doctoral student at the Institute of Historical Research in London from 1947 to 1949. He studied palaeography and diplomatic under V. H. Galbraith and John Goronwy Edwards. During this time, he was a contemporary of the Tudor historian Geoffrey Elton.

In 1951, West was awarded his doctorate from Leeds for his 1950 thesis, The Office of the Justiciar in Anglo-Norman England. Prior to this, he had been appointed the Rouse Ball research student at Trinity College, Cambridge, where he worked from 1949 to 1952. At Cambridge, his contemporaries included Geoffrey Best, Donald Friedman, Peter Green, E. J. Kenney, Richard Mayne, and Victor Sandelson. Supervised by mediaeval scholar Edward Miller, West completed a second doctoral thesis, The Justiciarship in England, 1204–32. These two theses formed the basis of his 1966 book, The Justiciarship in England 1066–1232.

== Career ==
While at Cambridge, West developed an interest in comparing "alien rule"—such as that of the Normans in England—with colonial governance in other regions. This led him to accept the position of the first Research Fellow in Pacific History at the Australian National University (ANU) in Canberra in late 1952.

In 1954, West travelled to Papua New Guinea to gather research on Hubert Murray, the first Australian lieutenant-governor of Papua, and other local administrators. In 1955, he took up a senior lectureship in history at Victoria University of Wellington in New Zealand. Research trips conducted from Wellington in 1958 resulted in his book Political Advancement in the South Pacific (1961), a comparative study of colonial practice in Fiji, Tahiti, and American Samoa.

West returned to Canberra in 1959 as a senior research fellow at the ANU, becoming a senior fellow in Pacific history in 1962. Following a brief tenure as professor of comparative government at the University of Adelaide (Bedford Park campus, now Flinders University) in 1964–1965, he returned to ANU as a professorial fellow.

In 1973, he took leave to assist in the establishment of the University of Buckingham in the UK, serving as professor of history and dean of arts & social studies until 1974. He subsequently joined the newly founded Deakin University in Geelong, Australia, as professor of history and government and foundation dean of social sciences. He served as pro vice-chancellor (research and development) from 1987 until his retirement as emeritus professor in 1990.

West was a foundation member of the Australian Academy of the Humanities and served as its secretary from 1969 to 1973. He contributed entries to the Oxford Dictionary of National Biography and wrote biographies of Hubert Murray and his brother, the classicist Gilbert Murray.

== Later life and death ==
Following his retirement in 1990, West returned to Cambridge. He had maintained a long association with Churchill College, Cambridge, having been a fellow commoner in 1981 and 1982 and an overseas fellow in 1984 and 1985. He pursued research at the Churchill Archives Centre, and later quoted the first master of Churchill, Sir John Cockcroft, as recommending Churchill to him because the plumbing was better than at Trinity, although it was also Sir John's enthusiasm for building up the archives that had led him to undertake research there.

Francis West died at his home in Cambridge on 2 February 2025, aged 97, following a short respiratory illness. His books were bequeathed to Churchill College, Cambridge. His papers are held in the National Library of Australia and the Royal Commonwealth Society collections at Cambridge University Library.

== Selected works ==
- Political Advancement in the South Pacific: A Comparative Study of Colonial Practice in Fiji, Tahiti and American Samoa (1961). Melbourne: Oxford University Press.
- Hubert Murray (Great Australians Series) (1962). Melbourne: Oxford University Press.
- The Justiciarship in England 1066-1232 (1966). Cambridge: Cambridge University Press.
- Hubert Murray: The Australian Pro-Consul (1968). Melbourne: Oxford University Press.
- (Ed.) Selected Letters of Hubert Murray (1970). Melbourne: Oxford University Press.
- Biography as History (1973). Sydney: Sydney University Press.
- University House: Portrait of an Institution (1980). Canberra: ANU Press.
- Gilbert Murray: A Life (1984). London: Croom Helm; New York: St Martin's Press.
- The Study of the Past (1984). Deakin University Press.
- From Alamein to Scarlet Beach: The History of 2/4 Light Anti-Aircraft Regiment, Second A.I.F. (1989). Deakin University Press.
- Errant Historian: A Memoir (2026). Cambridge: Gretton Books.
