= Gerald Kirk =

English footballer (1883–1915)

Personal information
- Full name: Gerald Kirk
- Date of birth: 14 July 1883
- Place of birth: Bramley, England
- Date of death: 24 April 1915 (aged 31)
- Place of death: Poperinge, Belgium
- Position: Centre half

Senior career*
Years	Team	Apps	(Gls)
1900–1905	Ingleton		
1905–1906	Bradford City	40	(2)
1906–1907	Leeds City	7	(1)
1907–1908	Bradford City	3	(0)
- Ingleton
- * Club domestic league appearances and goals

Gerald Kirk (14 July 1883 – 24 April 1915) was an English amateur footballer who played as a centre half in the Football League for Bradford City and Leeds City. He spent the majority of his career in non-League football with Ingleton, whom he captained.

== Personal life ==
Kirk was born into a wealthy land-owning family. He attended Pocklington School and later married. On 1 September 1914, a month after Britain's entry into the First World War, Kirk enlisted as a private in the King's Own (Royal Lancaster Regiment). In October he was promoted to lance corporal and by 31 January 1915, he had been commissioned as a second lieutenant. In March 1915, Kirk's battalion was posted to the Western Front and entered the trenches near Bailleul. On 23 April 1915, he was shot through the chest while leading his platoon in an attack and died the following day at Number 3 Casualty Clearing Station, Poperinghe. Kirk was buried in Poperinghe Old Military Cemetery.

== Career statistics ==
Appearances and goals by club, season and competition
Club	Season	League			FA Cup		Total	
Club	Season	Division	Apps	Goals	Apps	Goals	Apps	Goals
Bradford City	1905–06	Second Division	24	1	3	0	27	1
Bradford City	1906–07	Second Division	16	1	0	0	16	1
Bradford City	Total		40	2	3	0	43	2
Leeds City	1907–08	Second Division	8	1	1	0	9	1
Bradford City	1907–08	Second Division	3	0	—		3	0
Bradford City	Total		43	2	3	0	45	2
Career total			51	3	4	0	55	3

== Honours ==
Ingleton

- Lancaster & District League: 1902–03
