= Mike Stevenson =

British cricketer (1927–1994)

Personal information
- Full name: Michael Hamilton Stevenson
- Born: 13 June 1927; Chinley, Derbyshire, England
- Died: 19 September 1994 (aged 67); Colwyn Bay, Wales
- Batting: Right-handed
- Bowling: Left-arm orthodox slow

Domestic team information
- Years: Team
- 1949–1952: Cambridge University
- 1950–1952: Derbyshire
- 1955–1967: MCC
- FC debut: 7 May 1949 Cambridge Univ. v Essex
- Last FC: 10 June 1967 MCC v Cambridge Univ.

Career statistics
Competition	First-class
Matches	66
Runs scored	2,467
Batting average	24.91
100s/50s	4/14
Top score	122
Balls bowled	4,123
Wickets	50
Bowling average	37.64
5 wickets in innings	1
10 wickets in match	0
Best bowling	5/36
Catches/stumpings	26/–
- Source: CricketArchive, November 2011

Michael Hamilton Stevenson (13 June 1927 – 19 September 1994) was a schoolmaster, journalist and cricketer who played for Cambridge University, Derbyshire, Ireland and Marylebone Cricket Club (MCC) between 1949 and 1969.

Stevenson was born at Chinley, Derbyshire and educated at Rydal School, Colwyn Bay, North Wales, where he was cricket captain in his last year. He played various matches for Derbyshire in 1945 and 1946 and for Staffordshire in 1947 and Derbyshire 2nd XI in 1948. He went to Cambridge University in 1948 and was given a blue in his first season 1949. He played regularly for the university for four years appearing in the Varsity match each year. In 1950 against Leicestershire Stevenson made 109 in a third wicket stand with Peter May of 233. In 1952 against Surrey he made 111 in two and a half hours with two 6s and twelve 4s, and against Worcestershire he hit four 6s and six 4s to reach 53 within the hour. In 1950 and 1952 he played occasional games for Derbyshire – three in 1950 and one in 1952. He also played for Ireland in 1952 and 1956 on the basis of residential qualification after his parents retired there. He played for Leinster and Clontarf over three seasons. He also started playing for MCC in 1956, played for Derbyshire Juniors in 1958 and various matches for Ireland until 1964 and MCC until 1969.

He was a right-hand batsman who played 106 innings in 66 first-class matches with an average of 24.91 and a top score of 122. He was a slow left-arm orthodox bowler who took 50 first-class wickets at an average of 37.64 with a best performance of 5 for 36.

Stevenson taught at three public schools. At Pocklington School he ran the cricket and founded the Pocklington Pixies club which reached the final of the national club championship in their first year. He gave up teaching for a while and took up journalism and writing on North of England, cricket and rugby. He wrote two books, "A History of Yorkshire Cricket" and a biography of Ray Illingworth. After ten years he returned to Rydal to teach English and run the cricket.

Stevenson died at Colwyn Bay shortly after retiring at the age of 67.
