= Faskally Forest =

Park in Perth and Kinross, Scotland

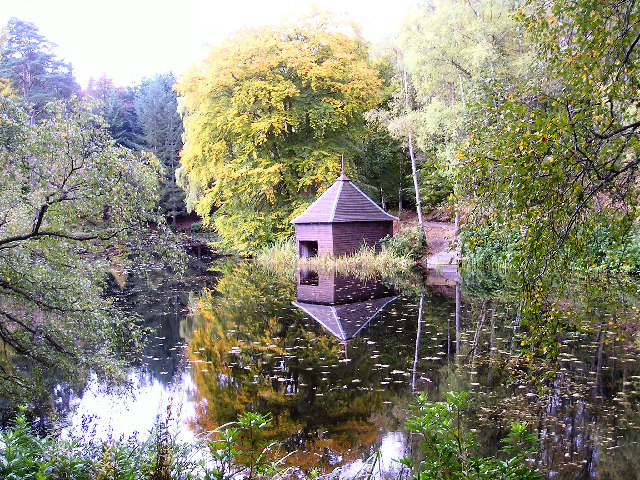
- Faskally Forest around Loch Dunmore
- Interactive map of Faskally Forest
- Type: Mixed woods
- Location: Perth and Kinross, Scotland
- Coordinates: 56.7°N 3.75°W
- Area: 25 acres (10 ha)
- Created: 1953
- Operator: The Forestry Commission
- Open: All year

Faskally Forest, also known as Faskally Woods, is a wooded area in the historic county of Perthshire, Scotland. It is among the mixed woodlands of Perthshire, and is well known for its radiant colours during the autumn. It is one of the early forest lands of Perthshire Big Tree County. Originally a "model woodland" developed in the 19th century with a resort owned by Archibald Edward Butter. In 1953, Faskally was acquired by the Forestry Commission of Scotland to set up a school for training young foresters.

A colourful annual event at Faskally, known as "The Enchanted Forest", received awards consecutively for three years (2011–2013), as the Best Cultural Event in Scotland.

== Location ==
Faskally Woods is located about 1 mile (1.6 km) north-west of Pitlochry, which is also a railhead.

It is situated on Loch Faskally's north shore, while the forest itself contains Loch Dunmore. When acquired by the Forestry Commission in 1953, it covered an area of about 55 hectares (140 acres), but in the present day measures 25 hectares (62 acres) after undergoing a "transformation into an irregular structure". The Faskally House is situated within this forest. The River Garry flows below the lawns of this house.

== History ==
The Faskally Forest was created in the 19th century by Archibald Butter, who later built his estate here. The entire estate was acquired by the Forestry Commission, and Faskally House was used as a forestry training centre until the late 1960s when it was shut down. The forest is maintained on a "continuous cover forestry basis" by developing appropriate management plans. Faskally Wood became a part of the Forestry Commission's Tummel Forest administration. Under the East Scotland Conservancy, the priority emphasis for its development was to make it a recreation centre with landscaping of high aesthetics, rather than producing timber.

== Features ==
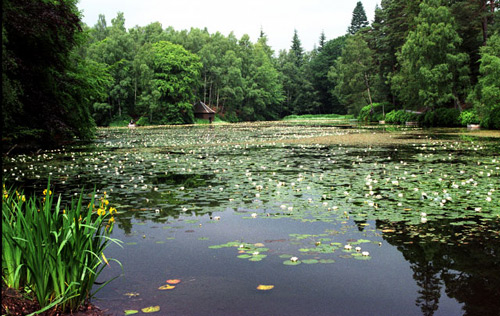
Loch Dunmore surrounded by Faskally Forest

The soil formation in this forest land is a mixture of brown earth and ironpans that are formed above the Dalradian mica schist. In view of sheltered conditions, the area experiences frost. The mean annual rainfall here is about 900 millimetres (35 in).

The vegetation in the early part of the 20th century consisted of European beech (Fagus sylvatica), Douglas-fir (Pseudotsuga menziesii), European larch (Larix decidua), Norway spruce (Picea abies), and Scots pine (Pinus sylvestris). Following the purchase of the forest land by the Forestry Commission, it was subjected to restrictions and restructuring of the forest vegetation, and reduction of the area. Sequential planting occurred, including Douglas fir, Norway spruce, western hemlock (Tsuga heterophylla), European beech, Scots pine, European larch and silver birch (Betula pendula Roth).

As of 1995, Faskally Woods has 23 species of trees comprising an assemblage of "conifers and broad leaves" vegetation such as Douglas fir, silver firs, wild cherry, and oak. The trees are of various sizes, and some are more than 100 years old.

== Events ==
There is a free, weekly 5K parkrun on Saturdays at 9:30am.

== Climate ==
Climate data for Faskally: 94 m (308 ft) 1991–2020 normals, extremes 1960–2019
Month	Jan	Feb	Mar	Apr	May	Jun	Jul	Aug	Sep	Oct	Nov	Dec	Year
Record high °C (°F)	14.5 (58.1)	14.6 (58.3)	21.6 (70.9)	23.5 (74.3)	26.0 (78.8)	31.2 (88.2)	30.0 (86.0)	28.7 (83.7)	26.8 (80.2)	21.8 (71.2)	18.6 (65.5)	15.9 (60.6)	31.2 (88.2)
Mean daily maximum °C (°F)	5.6 (42.1)	6.7 (44.1)	9.2 (48.6)	11.9 (53.4)	15.3 (59.5)	17.5 (63.5)	19.2 (66.6)	18.7 (65.7)	16.1 (61.0)	11.8 (53.2)	8.4 (47.1)	5.7 (42.3)	12.3 (54.1)
Daily mean °C (°F)	2.4 (36.3)	3.2 (37.8)	5.1 (41.2)	7.4 (45.3)	10.2 (50.4)	13.0 (55.4)	14.7 (58.5)	14.2 (57.6)	12.0 (53.6)	8.2 (46.8)	5.1 (41.2)	2.4 (36.3)	8.3 (46.9)
Mean daily minimum °C (°F)	−0.7 (30.7)	−0.3 (31.5)	0.9 (33.6)	2.9 (37.2)	5.1 (41.2)	8.4 (47.1)	10.2 (50.4)	9.7 (49.5)	7.8 (46.0)	4.6 (40.3)	1.8 (35.2)	−1.0 (30.2)	4.1 (39.4)
Record low °C (°F)	−19.6 (−3.3)	−13.3 (8.1)	−13.9 (7.0)	−7.2 (19.0)	−3.9 (25.0)	−1.2 (29.8)	−1.5 (29.3)	−0.6 (30.9)	−2.5 (27.5)	−5.7 (21.7)	−12.6 (9.3)	−18.2 (−0.8)	−19.6 (−3.3)
Average precipitation mm (inches)	120.2 (4.73)	81.6 (3.21)	66.8 (2.63)	56.8 (2.24)	60.2 (2.37)	64.4 (2.54)	75.3 (2.96)	81.1 (3.19)	73.0 (2.87)	107.0 (4.21)	103.2 (4.06)	108.6 (4.28)	998.2 (39.29)
Average precipitation days	16.0	13.4	12.5	10.8	10.8	11.9	13.1	12.2	11.9	15.0	15.3	14.8	157.7
Source 1: Météo Climat
Source 2: KNMI (extremes)
