= John Musgrave (cricketer) =

English cricketer (1845–1885)

John Musgrave Tattersall-Musgrave (?13 February 1845 – 12 March 1885) played first-class cricket in a single match for Cambridge University Cricket Club while a student at Cambridge University in 1868. He was born at Armley, Leeds, West Yorkshire and died at Beverley, East Riding of Yorkshire. Musgrave's name developed over the course of his life: according to Cricketarchive, he was born as "John Musgrave Tattersall"; at Cambridge, he was "John Musgrave"; by the time he received his Master of Arts in 1872, he was "J. Musgrave Tattersall-Musgrave". There is also doubt over his birth: Cricketarchive states that he was born on 13 February 1845, while the Alumni Cantabrigienses publication indicates that was the date of his baptism.

Musgrave was educated at Pocklington School and at St John's College, Cambridge. As a cricketer, he was a right-handed lower-order batsman and a right-arm fast bowler, bowling in the round-arm style. In his single first-class match in 1868 he failed to score in his only innings, and took one wicket for 19 runs with his bowling. He played minor cricket for amateur teams in Yorkshire between 1866 and 1873.

At his death in 1885, he left personal estate valued at £46,000 and land holdings in West Yorkshire and the East Riding.
