= John Oliver Musgrave =

New Zealand motor transport operator

John Oliver Musgrave (10 April 1895 – 19 October 1974) was a notable New Zealand motor transport operator. He was born in Bradford, Yorkshire, England on 10 April 1895.
