= Xavier Pick =

Xavier Pick is an art teacher and a former war artist in Iraq. Pick currently lives in Hong Kong and works as an educator throughout Asia. In 2008 and 2009, he joined the British Army's 20th Armoured Brigade (The Iron Fist) in southern Iraq to record the final weeks of Operation Telic, producing sketches, photographs and film footage.

Pick has a B.A. from the Glasgow School of Art and a M.A. from the Royal College of Art.

== Credentials ==
- Produced a series of coins commemorating the First World War, commissioned by The Royal Mint, 2013
- Managed ACAVA Parkham Street Studios for recent art and design graduates, 2012–13
- Conducted drawing courses for young people in Baghdad, 2011
- Official war artist, Ministry of Defence in Iraq, 2008 to present
- Conducted drawing courses for British troops in Iraq, 2008–09
- Visiting lecturer, Royal College of Art, 2005 to present
- Course leader and visiting lecturer, The Royal College of Art, 2003–05
