= Pocklington Beck =

Watercouse in the East Riding of Yorkshire

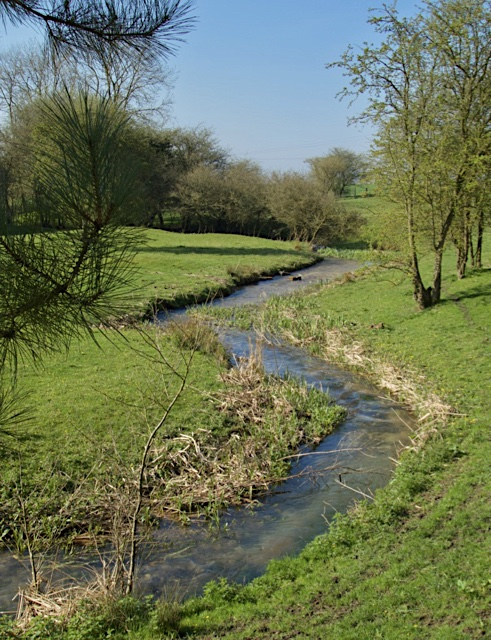
- Beck between Millington and Pocklington

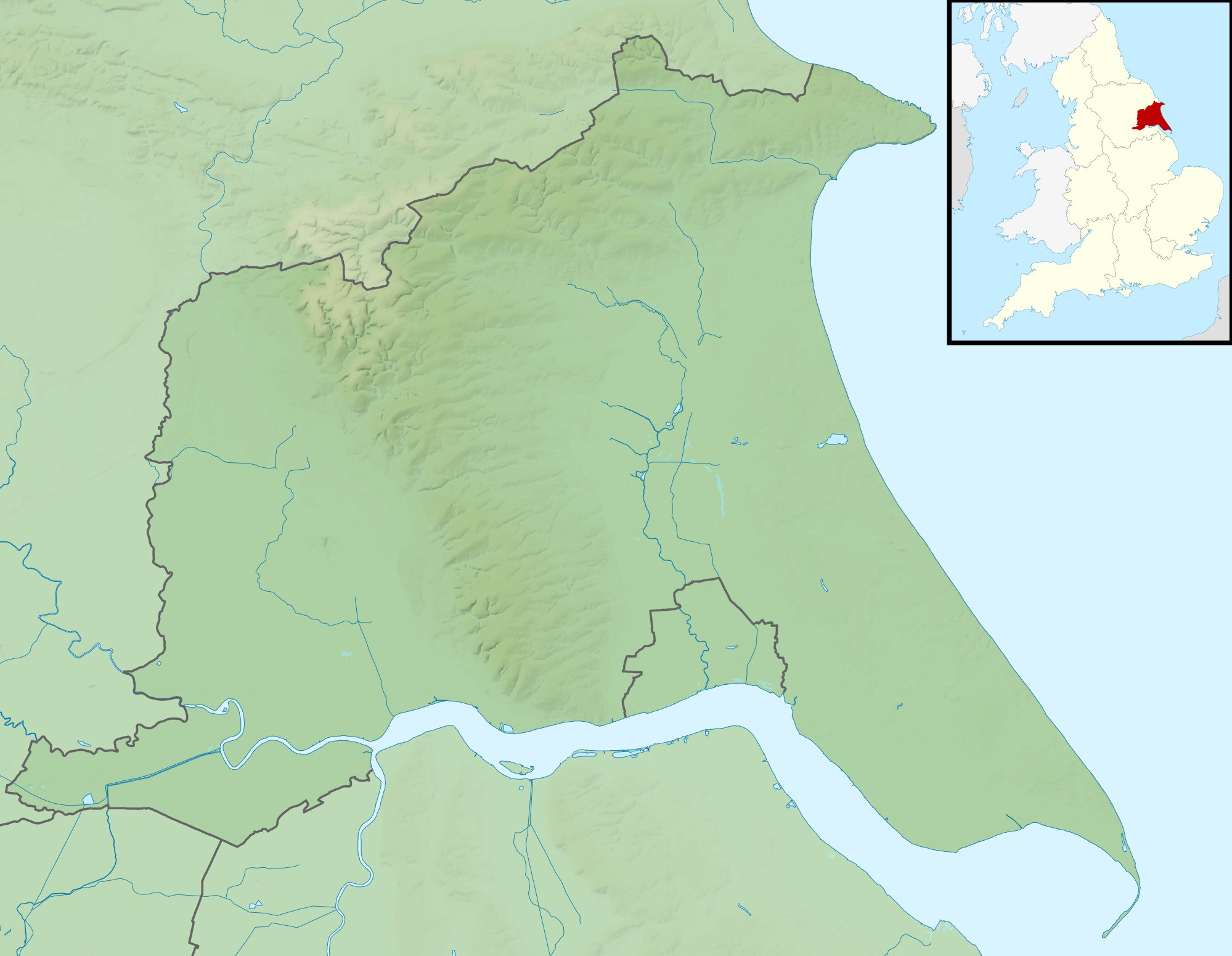
- Location within East Riding of Yorkshire

Location
- County: East Riding of Yorkshire
- Country: England

Physical characteristics
- Source: Millington Springs
  - location: Millington
  - coordinates: 53.9686°N 0.7164°W
  - elevation: 289 feet (88 m)
- Mouth: Cottingwith Lock
  - location: Cottingwith
  - coordinates: 53.8757°N 0.9366°W
  - elevation: 16 feet (5 m)
- Basin size: 23,300 acres (9,431 ha)

Basin features
- River system: River Derwent

Pocklington Beck is a watercourse that flows westwards from Pocklington in the East Riding of Yorkshire, and empties into the River Derwent at East Cottingwith. The beck is known for being culverted through the town of Pocklington, and for being susceptible to flooding. Historically the beck supported the villages along the route by providing water-power for several corn mills.

== Course ==
The beck has two feeder streams which are to the north of Pocklington, including Millington Springs which feed Millington Beck, an affluent of Pocklington Beck. Further downstream, the beck acquires different names such as Bielby Beck and simply just The Beck on mapping, but the Environment Agency lists it as Pocklington Beck until it reaches the River Derwent. The beck flows south-westwards across the low-lying edge of the Vale of York, and is the chief watercourse for drainage in the area.

As the beck runs through Pocklington, the streets and road run parallel to the beck, akin to the situation in Driffield. Various building schemes and civic improvements have left the beck largely culverted through the town of Pocklington, though accumulation of silt and gravel adds to the beck being flooded during high rainfall. To the south of Pocklington, a mill dam used to extend from just under the railway line to feed White Mill. After the old mill site, is a permanently flooded area which provides a haven for wildlife. Further south, the Pocklington Canal parallels the course of the beck all the way to the River Derwent, however, all the drainage channels still feed into the beck, not the canal. As it meanders through the land, the beck is the natural dividing line between the parishes, with Allerthorpe to the north of the beck, and Harswell and Seaton Ross to the south.

The beck flows into the Pocklington Canal at Cottingwith at a height of 16 feet (5 m) above sea level, and then the combined waters empty into the River Derwent. The beck has many tributaries and all told, drains an area covering 9,431 hectares (23,300 acres).

== Hydrology ==
Despite the land being underlain by the Pocklington Gravel Formation, which should drain away the excess water, the area surrounding the beck is fairly low-lying (at most it is 50 feet (15 m) above sea level apart from Millington Springs) and the beck is prone to flooding. Documents from the 1320s describe flooding in the small valley that the beck flows through due to the drains being overwhelmed, and the road crossing the beck at Walbut water mill being difficult to pass during periods of high rainfall.

Water from the beck was diverted south of Pocklington in 1818 to feed the Pocklington Canal. When this canal fell into disuse, neither waterway was maintained which led to flooding on both waterways. Flooding remains an issue on the beck, and in the 21st century the beck has flooded the town of Pocklington in 2007, 2012 and in 2015. During the period of the Boxing Day Floods of 2015, Pocklington was not as severely affected as other locations in Northern England, the beck did record its highest level at 2 feet 5 inches (0.73 m). Flooding through the town is partly due to fact that the beck has been culverted through the town, and silt and gravel have built up in the culverts. Work was undertaken in 2010 to remove debris, silt and gravel from the beck. Historical floods have occurred in December 1927, when snow-melt and heavy rain resulted in numerous streets within Pocklington being inundated, December 1954 when several streets were flooded to a depth of 2 feet (0.61 m), October 1968, when 1.31 inches (33 mm) of rain fell in one day (the area normally receives an average of 24 inches (610 mm) of rain per year), and December 1996 when Chapmangate was flooded.

In 1995, sewage spilled into Pocklington Beck which then flowed into the Pocklington Canal through the canal had which is fed from Pocklington Beck. Many fish were suffocated due to the sewage removing the oxygen from the water. The National Rivers Authority (precursor of the Environment Agency) spent time pumping oxygen into the canal.

In 2016, a proposal was put forward to build a flood alleviation dam upstream of the town of Pocklington which was approved at a cost of £4.6 million in October 2017. Work commenced in 2018 and the dam was completed in 2019 and cost £4.7 million. The dam consists of a bund 5 metres (16 ft) high, 600 metres (2,000 ft) long, and 45 metres (148 ft) wide, located at SE808499.

The spring at Millington used to be a source of public water supply, at a rate of 590,000 imperial gallons; 710,000 US gallons (2,700,000 L) per day, but it was closed in the 1970s when rising nitrate levels within the water became an issue. In 2024, Yorkshire Water stated that they would be investing £7.3 million in upgraded the wastewater treatment works at Pocklington to prevent discharge into the beck during periods of heavy or prolonged rainfall, and that phosphorus pollution would be reduced.

== Flora and fauna ==
The beck is known to have species of brown trout, rainbow trout, minnow, stickleback and crayfish along its length. The native white-clawed crayfish was found to be living in the culverts under Pocklington town when action was being taken to remove gravel and silt from the beck. Further downstream is the Melbourne and Thornton Ings SSSI, which supports several plants including reed grass, bladder sedge, reed sweetgrass, marsh stitchwort and tubular water-dropwort. It is also host to a variety of birdlife such as pintail, garganey and gadwall. Otters are also known to visit the site.

== Industry ==
The beck supported several watermills, with some still working up until the middle of the 20th century. The development of the town of Pocklington was due to the "fast-flowing beck", which allowed for several mills to be constructed and the mills were "crucial to the town's development."

- Bielby Beck (SE787440) – a corn mill last used in 1940. Corn was brought to the mill along a special cut of the Pocklington Canal. The mill building is still extant and is grade II listed.
- Clock Mill (SE807496) – a corn mill.
- Devonshire Mill (SE800478) – Former corn mill; can be visited for its gardens. Building is now grade II listed.
- Millington Mill (SE833520) – originally a corn mill on Millington Beck, it was used as a saw mill in the 1920s.
- Ousethorpe Fulling Mill (SE813511) – Part of Medieval site recorded as early as 1241, located on Ridings Beck, a tributary of Pocklington Beck upstream of Pocklington.
- St Helen's Gate Mill (SE806493) - a corn mill, later used as a saw mill.
- Walbut Mill (SE782444) – a corn mill which was subject to flooding, and its mill-dam also caused much flooding in the area, so much so, that a court of sewers ordered a new channel was to be cut around the mill as a diversionary channel.
- White Mill (SE799483) – a corn mill. Also known as Hodgson's or Thirsk Mill, it later had its own railway siding connected to the York–Beverley line near Pocklington station.
