= Seaton Ross =

Village and civil parish in the East Riding of Yorkshire, England

Coordinates: 53.862541°N 0.813253°W

- Village and civil parish
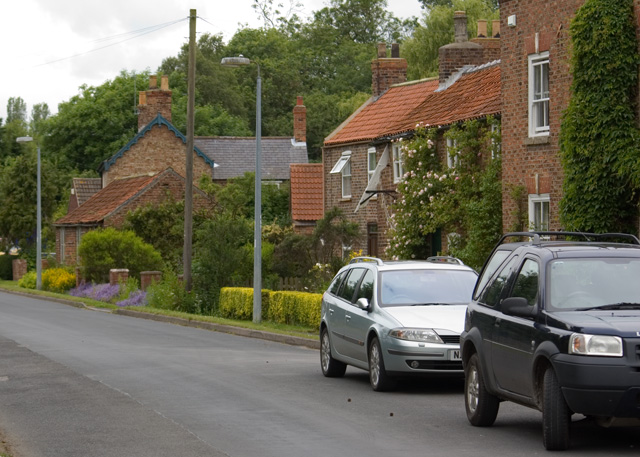
- North End, Seaton Ross

- Location within the East Riding of Yorkshire
- Population: 565 (2011 census)
- OS grid reference: SE781413
- Civil parish: Seaton Ross
- Unitary authority: East Riding of Yorkshire
- Ceremonial county: East Riding of Yorkshire
- Region: Yorkshire and the Humber
- Country: England
- Sovereign state: United Kingdom
- Post town: YORK
- Postcode district: YO42
- Dialling code: 01759
- Police: Humberside
- Fire: Humberside
- Ambulance: Yorkshire
- UK Parliament: Goole and Pocklington

Seaton Ross is a village and civil parish in the East Riding of Yorkshire, England. It is situated approximately 6 miles (9.7 km) west of the market town of Market Weighton and 3 miles (4.8 km) north-west of the village of Holme-on-Spalding-Moor. It lies to the south of the A1079 road and north of the A163 road.

According to the 2011 UK census, Seaton Ross parish had a population of 565, an increase on the 2001 UK census figure of 545.

== History ==
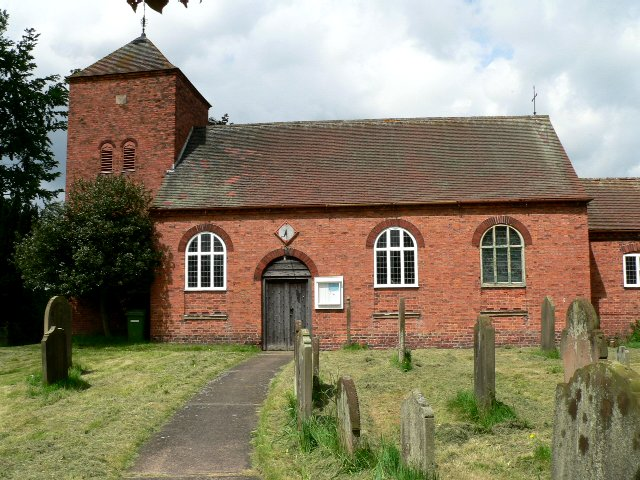
Parish Church in Seaton Ross

The village was recorded in the 11th century Domesday Book using its original name of Seaton (or Settone). This name was derived from the old English words 'Sea' - meaning a body of water, and 'Ton'- meaning an enclosure or farmstead. The 'body of water' probably refers to the wetlands east of the village and towards Holme upon Spalding Moor, itself built on a marsh, which have been drained and cultivated since that time. Aside from recording the village's name the book also shows that the area was an established manor before Norman times, paying a significant amount of tax in comparison to its size - although several other settlements are included in the assessment - saying; 'Settone : Gamel had 1 manor of 4 carucates for geld and 2 ploughs can be there'. The quote then continues: 'Now Nigel has it of the Count of Mortain, and it is waste', which is a reference to the land being subsequently seized and laid waste by William the Conqueror during his scorched earth campaign to end dissent in the north. The dramatic effect of this action can be seen in the value of the land, which fell from £40 per year to only £1 per year in the period to 1086 following William's campaign.

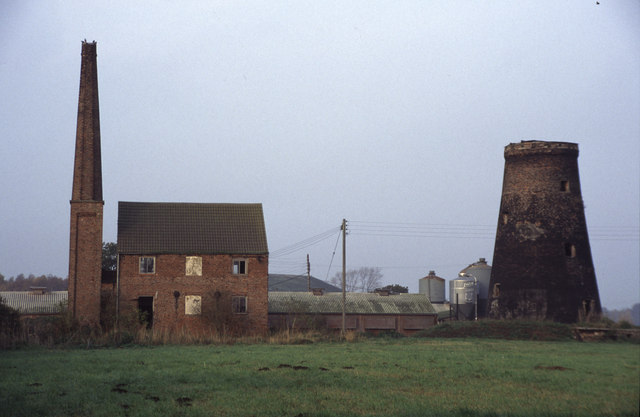
The Old Seaton Ross Mill

The newly installed ruling family, the Saytons, held the land for a time until they had their property seized as a result of their support of the Scots during the reign of Edward I, and tenure was passed to Edmund de Mauley as a reward for his support of the king. The village was passed by descent to the de Ros family, who owned much land in the area including that of the nearby villages of Storwood and Melbourne, and the village came to be referred to as 'Seaton Ross' for the first time. The land was again confiscated due to Baron de Ros's support of the House of Lancaster during the Wars of the Roses and passed to the Earl of Worcester, from where it eventually found its way into the hands of the Everingham Estate

One of the oldest buildings in the village is St. Edmunds church, whose current structure dates from 1789 and is built on the foundations of an earlier church which can trace its records back to 1653. The church also has a Norman font attesting to an even earlier origin. The church was designated a Grade II listed building in 1967. Another site of historical note is the Lady Well, a natural spring located in fields south of the village. Not much is known of the history of this spring, but as with other such sacred pools in the county it is likely to be a place formerly dedicated to the Goddess Freya and re-appropriated by early Christian missionaries as a shrine to the Virgin Mary. Crop markings dating from the Iron and Roman ages have been identified in fields near this natural spring.

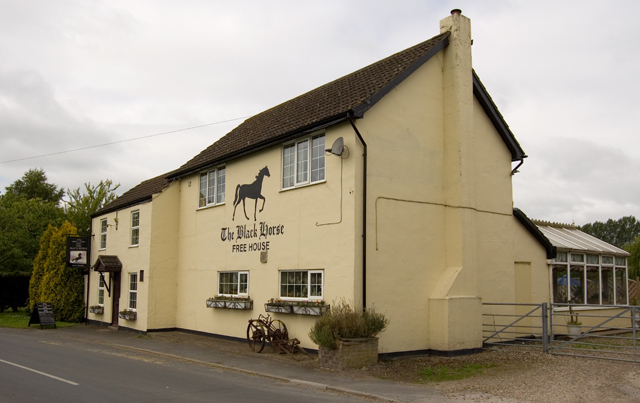
The Black Horse

The village had always been a farming area, with several large farms which survive to the present day. However, by the 18th century the village was also noted for its production of bricks that went into the construction of many of its current structures, such as the brick parish church. The village's prosperity was becoming more obvious, with a large proportion of its original dwellings re-built in brick by the Everingham Estate and new buildings springing up; the Wesleyan Chapel, the Methodist Chapel, the Post Office, the two mills and the Village School (now the village hall). The village also became home to one of Britain's largest Sundials, measured at 12 feet in diameter and built by local surveyor William Watson, as well as another two located at Watson's family home and on his memorial at St Edmund's church.

The celebration of Seaton Ross's prosperity as a parish culminated in the beginning of the famous Seaton Ross Show, which began as a village feast and grew into an annual two-day fair of produce, livestock, crafts and country sports. It continued as Seaton Ross Feast which was celebrated annually until 2007. After a break of 7 years Seaton Ross Fest, a small music festival, was started to create a community event in lieu of the Feast. The village currently maintains a children's play area, playing fields, the village hall, the village nature plot and its public house; The Black Horse.

== RAF Melbourne ==
From 1940 the East Common was requisitioned by the Royal Air Force as a light airfield and named RAF Melbourne. It was later re-built as a standard RAF Bomber Command base from which four engined aircraft flew operational sorties.

The airfield had a large impact on the village, which named one of its public houses after the inhabitants of the station (The Bombers) and had a bench erected in memory of the association in 1986, and at one time the restaurant ceiling to the public house was formed from DH Mosquito wing skins. There is also a memorial outside the village dedicated to the crews of the 109 aircraft that were lost from the airfield.

The airfield ceased operations in 1945 and stopped flights in 1946, it is now owned by Melrose Farm Ltd who rent the old runways to York Raceway throughout the summer.

== See also ==
- Listed buildings in Seaton Ross
