= Listed buildings in Cottingwith =

Cottingwith is a civil parish in the county of the East Riding of Yorkshire, England. It contains 13 listed buildings that are recorded in the National Heritage List for England. All the listed buildings are designated at Grade II, the lowest of the three grades, which is applied to "buildings of national importance and special interest". The parish contains the village of East Cottingwith, the hamlet of Storwood and the surrounding countryside. The Pocklington Canal passes through the parish and the listed buildings associated with it are two locks, a swing bridge and a road bridge. The other listed buildings are houses, a church and a former chapel.

== Buildings ==
| Name and location | Photograph | Date | Notes |
|---|---|---|---|
| House north of St Mary's Church; 53.87403°N 0.93158°W | — | Early to mid-18th century | The house is in colourwashed red brick, and has a pantile roof with raised coped gables. There are two storeys and three bays. On the front is a doorway, and the windows are sashes under segmental brick arches. |
| The Old Ship Inn; 53.87373°N 0.93139°W | — | Mid-18th century | The house is in rendered red brick, with a dentilled brick eaves cornice and pantile roof. There are two storeys and three bays. On the front is a doorway with a fanlight, and the windows are sashes, those on the upper floor horizontally sliding. Inside, there is a large inglenook fireplace with an oak bressumer. |
| Sycamore House; 53.87240°N 0.93009°W | — | Mid to late 18th century | The house is in orange brick, and has a pantile roof with raised coped gables. There are two storeys and three bays. The central doorway has a fanlight, the windows are sashes, all with wedge lintels. |
| Hall Garth; 53.87506°N 0.93155°W | — | Late 18th century | The house is in rendered and colourwashed red brick, and has a slate roof with raised coped gables. There are two storeys and three bays. The central doorway has a fanlight, and the windows are sashes. |
| School House; 53.87408°N 0.93199°W | — | Late 18th century | The house is in brown brick, with a dentilled brick eaves cornice, and a pantile roof with raised coped gables. The central doorway has a rectangular fanlight, the windows are 20th-century replacements, and all the openings are under segmental brick arches. |
| Storwood Grange; 53.89360°N 0.90776°W | | Late 18th century | The house is in red brick, with a floor band and a pantile roof with raised gables. There are two storeys and attics, and three bays. The central doorway has a rectangular fanlight in panelled reveals, the windows are sashes, and all the openings have wedge lintels. |
| The Elms; 53.87201°N 0.92997°W | — | Late 18th century | The house is in orange brick with a pantile roof. There are two storeys, a T-shaped plan, and a front of four bays. On the front is a Tuscan porch, and a doorway with a fanlight. The windows are sashes, those on the ground floor with wedge lintels and raised keystones, and on the upper floor under cambered brick arches. |
| House north of The Old Ship Inn; 53.87399°N 0.93133°W | — | Late 18th century | The house is in orange brick, with a stepped brick eaves cornice, and a pantile roof with raised coped gables. There are two storeys and three bays. The central doorway has a divided fanlight, to its left is a casement window, and the other windows are sashes. All the openings are under segmental brick arches. |
| St Mary's Church; 53.87382°N 0.93172°W | | 1780 | The church is in red-brown brick, with a stepped brick eaves cornice, and a slate roof with raised coped gables. It consists of a nave and a chancel in one unit, a canted apse at the east end, and a west tower. The tower has a plinth, a round-headed west window, round-headed bell openings, and a pyramidal lead roof. The doorway and windows have round heads under gauged brick arches. |
| Former Methodist Chapel; 53.87304°N 0.93041°W | | 1796 | The former chapel is in red brick, with a stepped and dentilled eaves cornice, and a pantile roof with raised coped gables containing oculi. There is one storey and four bays. The doorway has pilasters, a divided fanlight and a hood, and the windows are sashes under flat gauged brick arches. |
| Cottingwith Lock; 53.87577°N 0.93602°W | | 1815 | The lock on the Pocklington Canal is in red brick with gritstone dressings. There are rounded splays to the east and west, timber lock gates, and sluices with gritstone capping. |
| Gardham Lock and swing bridge 53.89898°N 0.89141°W | | c. 1818 | The lock and swing bridge are on the Pocklington Canal. The lock chamber is in red brick with gritstone dressings, and has parallel sides, splayed at the ends beyond the gates. Between the gates is a manually operated iron swing bridge. The curved recess for the bridge has stone ridges along the top to provide purchase. |
| Hagg Bridge; 53.89758°N 0.91053°W | | 1818 | The bridge carries Hagg Lane (B1228 road) over the Pocklington Canal and a beck. It is in brick with stone voussoirs and coping. It consists of two basket arches, the larger over the canal. A towpath runs beneath the canal arch on the north side, and there are rectangular buttresses on both sides of each arch. |
