= Listed buildings in Pocklington =

Pocklington is a civil parish in the county of the East Riding of Yorkshire, England. It contains 16 listed buildings that are recorded in the National Heritage List for England. Of these, one is listed at Grade I, the highest of the three grades, and the others are at Grade II, the lowest grade. The parish contains the market town of Pocklington and the surrounding countryside. The Pocklington Canal ends to the south of the town, and two of its locks are listed. The other listed buildings include houses and cottages, shops, a church, a former watermill, a milestone, a railway station and associated structures, and a war memorial.

== Key ==
Grade	Criteria
I	Buildings of exceptional interest, sometimes considered to be internationally important
II	Buildings of national importance and special interest

== Buildings ==
Name and location	Photograph	Date	Notes	Grade
All Saints' Church; 53.93073°N 0.77949°W		12th century or earlier	The church has been altered and extended through the centuries, including a restoration in 1901–02 by John Bilson. It is built in limestone with lead roofs, and consists of a nave with a clerestory, north and south aisles, a south porch, north and south transepts, an east aisle on the north transept, a chancel with a north chapel, and a west tower embraced by the aisles. The tower has four stages, a chamfered plinth, angle buttresses, moulded string courses, and a west doorway, above which is a five-light Perpendicular window with a hood mould. Above are two-light windows with segmental heads, three-light transomed bell openings with hood moulds, clock faces, and an embattled parapet with eight crocketed pinnacles.	I
3–11 Pavement; 53.93047°N 0.78016°W	—	17th century (probable)	A row of four timber framed cottages, rendered on the exterior, with a pantile roof. There are two storeys and four bays, with an outshut and additions at the rear. On the front are four doorways, and the windows are a mix of horizontally sliding sashes and modern windows.	II
Oak House; 53.93036°N 0.77854°W		c. 1690	A house that has been converted and used for other purposes, it is in brown and red brick on a chamfered plinth, with a modillion eaves cornice, a low pediment over the central bay, and a hipped pantile roof. There are two storeys and attics, and five bays. The ground floor contains modern shopfronts, on the upper floor are sash windows under flat gauged brick arches, and above are two pedimented roof dormers with sashes.	II
80 and 82 Brass Castle Hill; 53.93182°N 0.77727°W		Mid-18th century	A pair of houses in brick, with stone dressings, rusticated stucco quoins, a moulded timber eaves cornice, and a pantile roof with a coped gable on the right. There are two storeys and seven bays. The two doorways have attached Tuscan columns, a rectangular fanlight and a dentilled cornice. Flanking the right doorway are bow windows, in the centre are blocked windows, and the other windows are sashes under flat gauged brick arches.	II
7 Waterloo Lane; 53.93115°N 0.77852°W	—	Late 18th century	A house, later two shops, in colourwashed brick with a pantile roof. There are two storeys and three bays. The ground floor contains two shopfronts, and on the upper floor are sash windows with wedge lintels.	II
Devonshire Mill; 53.92052°N 0.78237°W		1808	The former watermill is in brown brick with a pantile roof. There are three storeys and five bays. On the ground floor are two doorways. Above the doorway on the second bay is a taking-in door, over which is a two-storey lucarne with a gable and bargeboards. The windows are sashes under segmental brick arches.	II
Silburn Lock; 53.91424°N 0.80032°W		c. 1813	The disused lock on the Pocklington Canal is in red brick with gritstone dressings. The lock chamber has parallel sides and rounded splays, stepped at the lower end.	II
Top Lock and Canal Head; 53.91905°N 0.79506°W		c. 1818	The disused lock on the Pocklington Canal is in red brick with gritstone dressings. The lock chamber has parallel sides, it is splayed at the ends, and stepped at the lower end. The lock gates and manual and hydraulic gearing mechanism have been restored to traditional design.	II
11 and 13 Waterloo Lane; 53.93119°N 0.77824°W	—	Early 19th century	A pair of shops in colourwashed brick with a pantile roof. There are two storeys and three bays. On the front is a doorway with reeded pilasters and a rectangular fanlight. To its right is a 20th-century shopfront, and to the left is a bow window with sashes. The upper floor contains sash windows in architraves.	II
Milestone and mounting block 53.91074°N 0.77064°W		Early 19th century	The milestone and mounting block are on the southwest side of the A1079 road. The mounting block is in limestone and has three steps. On it is a round-headed cast iron plaque with the distances to Beverley and York.	II
Waterloo Buildings; 53.93111°N 0.77881°W	—	1828	The house is in brown brick with a hipped pantile roof. There are two storeys and three bays. In the centre is a Roman Doric porch, and on the left is a named datestone. The windows are sashes under wedge lintels with channelled voussoirs, and projecting fluted keystones.	II
25 and 27 Railway Street; 53.92941°N 0.78091°W	—	c. 1847	A pair of houses, originally railway crossing keepers' houses, in red and brown brick on a chamfered plinth, with oversailing eaves and slate roofs. There are two storeys and four bays the outer bays projecting. The entrances are on the sides. Most of the windows are sashes under slightly segmental gauged brick arches.	II
Pocklington railway station 53.92891°N 0.78000°W		1847	The railway station, designed by G. T. Andrews, is in red brick, with stone dressings and a slate roof. It consists of a booking hall, a covered platform at the rear, and a linking wing on the left to the stationmaster's house. The booking hall has one storey and seven bays, and has a chamfered plinth, rusticated quoins, a sill band, a deep bracketed cornice, and a low parapet. The middle five bays have an arcade of five round-headed arches with a continuous hood mould on pilasters, with moulded bases and capitals. The central doorway has a fanlight with radial glazing in an architrave with imposts, a moulded round arch, and a shaped projecting keystone. It is flanked by sash windows in shouldered architraves.	II
Former Station Master's House; 53.92886°N 0.77952°W	—	1847	The house, designed by G. T. Andrews, is in red brick on a moulded plinth, with stone dressings, rusticated quoins, a sill band, a deep moulded cornice, and a hipped slate roof. There are two storeys, three bays and a rear wing. The doorway in the rear wing has a moulded architrave, and the windows are sashes in architraves.	II
Former goods shed 53.92858°N 0.77883°W	—	Mid-19th century	The railway goods shed, later used for other purposes, is in red brick with stone dressings, weatherboarding, and a hipped slate roof. There is one storey and five bays. The left bay has been underbuilt, and the second bay has a doorway flanked by windows with round gauged brick arches. On the other bays are large blocked openings with round gauged brick arches and keystones.	II
Pocklington Memorial Cross; 53.93190°N 0.77750°W		1921	The war memorial in Market Street is about 4 metres (13 ft) in height. It consists of a cross in brown stone on a tapering octagonal shaft in white stone. It stands on a square pedestal in white stone, on a base of two steps. On the pedestal is an inscription and the names of those lost in the First World War.	II
