= Storwood =

Hamlet in the East Riding of Yorkshire, England

Coordinates: 53.889691°N 0.918463°W

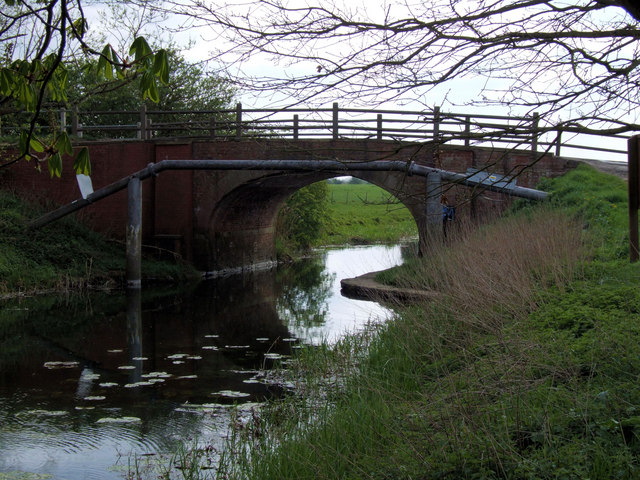
- Hagg Bridge

- Location within the East Riding of Yorkshire
- OS grid reference: SE711442
- Civil parish: Cottingwith
- Unitary authority: East Riding of Yorkshire
- Ceremonial county: East Riding of Yorkshire
- Region: Yorkshire and the Humber
- Country: England
- Sovereign state: United Kingdom
- Post town: YORK
- Postcode district: YO42
- Dialling code: 01759
- Police: Humberside
- Fire: Humberside
- Ambulance: Yorkshire
- UK Parliament: Goole and Pocklington

Storwood is a hamlet and former civil parish, now in the parish of Cottingwith, East Riding of Yorkshire, England. It is situated approximately 6 miles (9.7 km) south-west of Pocklington and lies to the south of the B1228 road on the south bank of the Pocklington Canal. In 1931 the civil parish had a population of 63. Storwood was formerly a township in the parish of Thornton, in 1866 Storwood became a civil parish, on 1 April 1935 the civil parish was merged with East Cottingwith to create Cottingwith. The name Storwood derives from the Old Norse storðþveit meaning either 'plantation clearing' or 'brushwood clearing', i.e. branches and twigs fallen from trees and shrubs.

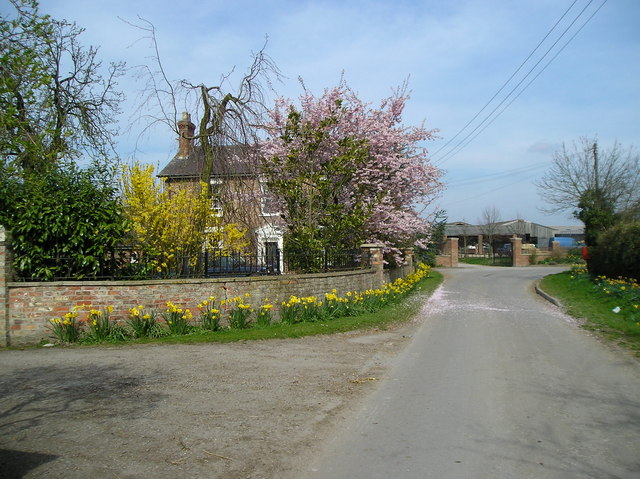
Storwood, looking north towards the manor house

== See also ==
- Listed buildings in Cottingwith
