= Listed buildings in Melbourne, East Riding of Yorkshire =

Melbourne is a civil parish in the county of the East Riding of Yorkshire, England. It contains ten listed buildings that are recorded in the National Heritage List for England. All the listed buildings are designated at Grade II, the lowest of the three grades, which is applied to "buildings of national importance and special interest". The parish contains the village of Melbourne and the surrounding countryside. The Pocklington Canal passes through the parish, and the listed buildings associated with it are a bridge and a lock. The other listed buildings consist of houses, farmhouses and associated structures, and a church.

== Buildings ==
Name and location	Photograph	Date	Notes
Grove Farmhouse; 53.89034°N 0.88186°W	—	Late 18th century	The farmhouse is in red-brown brick, and has a pantile roof with raised coped gables. There are two storeys and three wings, and a rear wing. The middle bay projects slightly and contains a doorway with pilasters and a fanlight with radial glazing. The windows are sashes with segmental heads under cambered wedge lintels.
Rose Lea; 53.88722°N 0.85785°W	—	Late 18th century	The house is in brown brick, with a moulded timber eaves cornice, and a pantile roof with raised coped gables. There are two storeys, three bays and a continuous rear outshut. The central doorway has a fanlight with radial glazing, and the windows are sashes under wedge lintels.
The Beeches; 53.88742°N 0.85687°W		Late 18th century	The house is in brown brick, with a floor band, and a moulded and raked eaves cornice, and a hipped slate roof. There are two storeys and three bays, the middle bay projecting under a pediment containing a blocked oval window. The central doorway has pilasters, a fanlight with radial glazing in panelled reveals and soffit, and an open pediment. The windows are sashes under wedge lintels.
Westfield Farmhouse; 53.89324°N 0.87770°W		Late 18th century	The farmhouse is in red brick with a hipped pantile roof. There are two storeys, three bays, and a continuous rear outshut. The central doorway has sidelights and is under a gauged flat brick arch. Above it is a Venetian window, and the other windows are sashes under gauged flat brick arches.
Melbourne Hall; 53.87992°N 0.85860°W		1780–90	The house is in red brick, with a floor band, a moulded eaves cornice, and hipped slate roofs. The main front has two storeys and three bays, the middle bay projecting and canted. It contains a doorway with a radial fanlight and a pediment on consoles flanked by sash windows. The outer bays and the upper floor also contain sash windows, all under flat gauged brick arches. On both returns are canted bay windows at the front end. At the rear is a former stable block on which is a bell turret with round moulded arches between pilasters, a dentilled cornice and a pyramidal roof with a ball finial.
Thornton Lock; 53.89018°N 0.84363°W		c.1813	The lock on the Pocklington Canal is in red brick with gritstone dressings. The lock chamber has parallel sides, with recesses for the gates and rounded splays at the ends.
Rossmoor Lodge; 53.88999°N 0.89063°W	—	1816	The house is in pale brown brick, the rear range in red brick, with a partial floor band, and a tile roof with raised coped gables on shaped kneelers. There are two storeys and three bays, the outer bays projecting. In the centre is a doorway with projecting pilasters and a fanlight with radial glazing, under a segmental arch. The windows are tripartite sashes; on the upper floor the middle window has a gauged brick arch, and those on the outer bays are in segmental-headed recesses. The outer bays have blocking courses with square coped abutments.
Church Bridge; 53.89044°N 0.85553°W		Early 19th century	The bridge carries a road over the Pocklington Canal. It is in red brick with gritstone dressings, and consists of a single basket arch flanked by semi-cylindrical coped buttresses. The bridge has a band to the ramped bridge deck, and a coped parapet ending in cylindrical abutments to the splays.
Stable block, Melbourne Hall; 53.88071°N 0.85861°W	—	Early 19th century	The stable block is in red brick with roofs of tile and pantile. There are seven bays, the middle bay with three storeys, and the others with two. The middle bay projects slightly and contains a giant round-arched recess with a doorway on the ground floor, a window above and on the top floor is a blocked Diocletian window and a coped] gable. The flanking bays contain sash windows under gauged flat brick arches. The outer two bays on each side are lower, with a dentilled eaves cornice and hipped roofs, and contain horizontally sliding sash windows.
St Monica's Church; 53.88617°N 0.85690°W		1882	The church is built in corrugated iron with a roof in sheet iron, and consists of a two-bay nave, north and south transepts, and a single-bay chancel with a north vestry. In the angle of the north transept and the chancel is a two-stage bell turret with a broach spire and false timber lucarnes. The windows have pointed heads, and the gables have fretted bargeboards.
