= St Helen's Church, Kilnwick Percy =

Church in Kilnwick Percy, East Riding of Yorkshire, England

Coordinates: 53°56′16″N 0°44′31″W

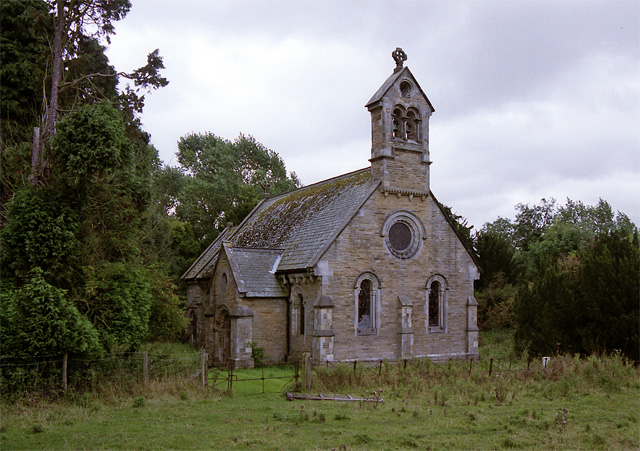
The church, in 2005

St Helen's Church is a redundant Anglican church in Kilnwick Percy, a hamlet in the East Riding of Yorkshire, in England.

A church was built in Kilnwick Percy in the late 12th century. It was rebuilt in 1865 by J. B. and W. Atkinson, probably with the same ground plan. Like its predecessor, it is in the Norman style, but with more ornament. The building was grade II listed in 1967. The church closed in 2012, and its collection of 16th- and 17th-century oak panels depicting Biblical scenes were incorporated into a reredos at All Saints' Church, Pocklington.

The church is built of sandstone with limestone dressings, and consists of a nave, a north porch and a chancel. At the west end is a corbelled-out gabled bellcote with two round-arched openings, below which is a circular window and two round-arched windows. The north door incorporates material from two doors in the original church. It has three orders, and a corbel table incorporating original carved corbels. Inside, there is a wall monument to Thomas Wood, who died in 1583.

== See also ==
- Listed buildings in Nunburnholme
