= St James' Church, Nunburnholme =

Church in Nunburnholme, East Riding of Yorkshire, England

Coordinates: 53°55′10″N 0°42′39″W

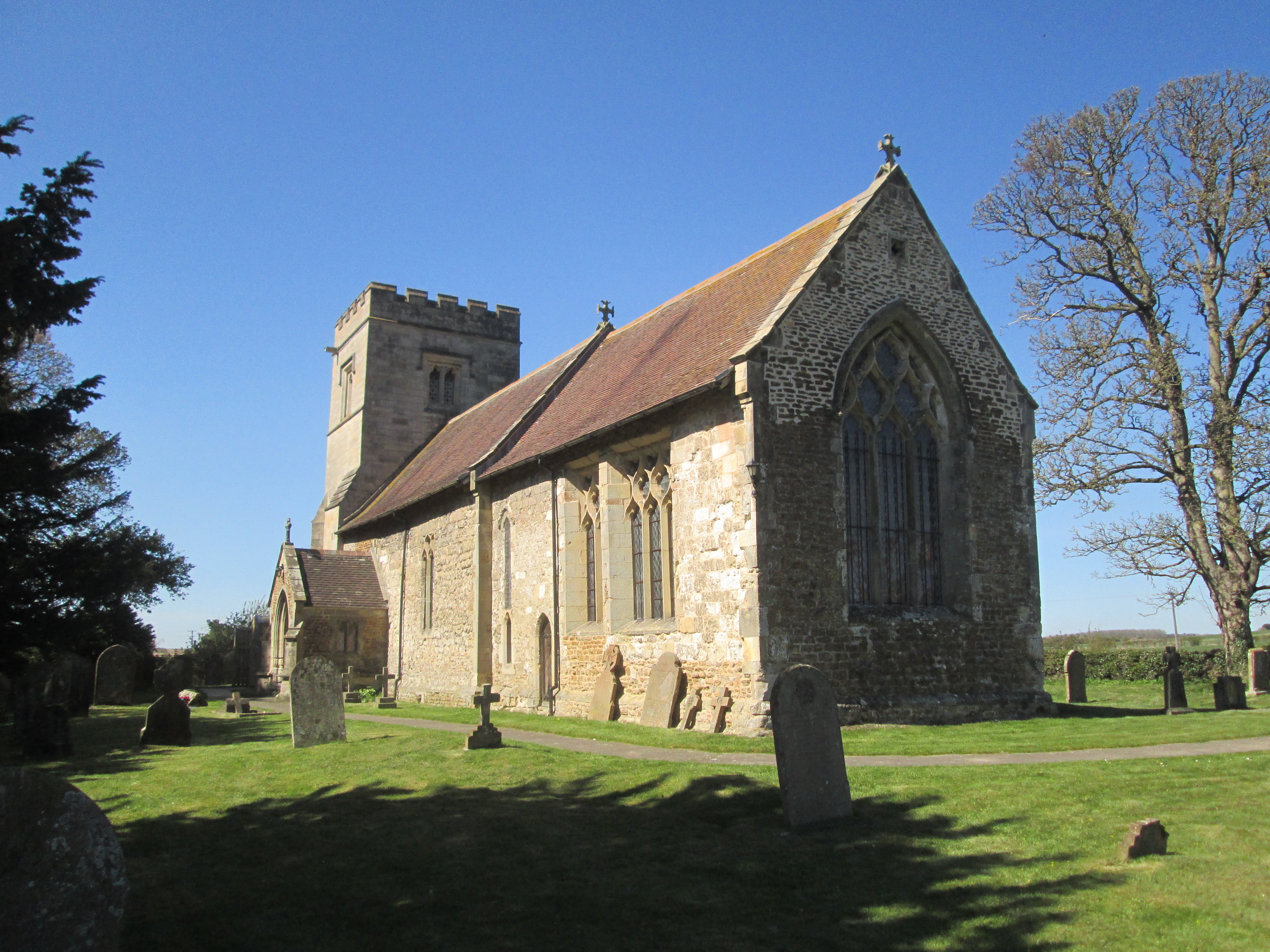
The church, in 2021

St James' Church is the parish church of Nunburnholme, a village in the East Riding of Yorkshire, in England.

The village had a church in the Saxon period. The oldest part of the current church is the nave, which was built in the 12th century, from which period the nave survives, while the chancel was constructed in the 13th century. It served as the church of the nearby Nunburnholme Priory. The tower was rebuilt in a new position in the late mediaeval period. The church was restored between 1872 and 1873 by George Gilbert Scott Jr.. The tower was again rebuilt from 1901 to 1902 by Temple Moore, in the same location as the 12th-century tower. The building was grade I listed in 1967.

The church is built in stone with tile roofs, and consists of a nave, a south porch, a chancel and a west tower. The tower has a chamfered plinth, diagonal buttresses, chamfered string courses, a two-light pointed west window with a hood mould, two-light square-headed bell openings with hood moulds, and an embattled parapet. The tower arch is Norman with two orders, having originally been the chancel arch. There is a reset Norman window in the north wall of the nave. There is a cross shaft inside the church dating from around 1000, carved with religious figures, foliage, and beasts.

== See also ==
- Grade I listed buildings in the East Riding of Yorkshire
- Listed buildings in Nunburnholme
