= Listed buildings in Thornton, East Riding of Yorkshire =

Thornton is a civil parish in the county of the East Riding of Yorkshire, England. It contains three listed buildings that are recorded in the National Heritage List for England. Of these, one listed at Grade II*, the middle of the three grades, and the others are at Grade II, the lowest grade. The parish contains the village of Thornton and the surrounding countryside, and the listed buildings consist of a church, and a bridge and a lock on the Pocklington Canal.

== Key ==
Grade	Criteria
II*	Particularly important buildings of more than special interest
II	Buildings of national importance and special interest

== Buildings ==
Name and location	Photograph	Date	Notes	Grade
St Michael's Church; 53.89742°N 0.84522°W		12th century	The church has been altered through the centuries, including a restoration and some rebuilding in 1890–92 by Ewan Christian. It is built in stone with some cobbles and brick, freestone dressings and a slate roof. The church consists of a nave, a north aisle, and a chancel. At the west end is a timber bellcote with louvres, and a pyramidal roof with a windvane.	II*
Walbut Bridge; 53.88821°N 0.82826°W		Early 19th century	The bridge carries a road over the Pocklington Canal. It is in red brick with gritstone dressings, and consists of a single basket arch. The bridge has a band at the bridge deck level, and coped and splayed parapets ending in half-round square coped abutments.	II
Walbut Lock; 53.88803°N 0.82758°W		Early 19th century	The lock on the Pocklington Canal is in red brick with gritstone dressings. It has a basin with parallel sides, and splays at each end beyond the gates.	II
