= Church of All Saints, Pocklington =

Church of England church in East Riding of Yorkshire, England

All Saints Church
- Church of All Saints, Pocklington
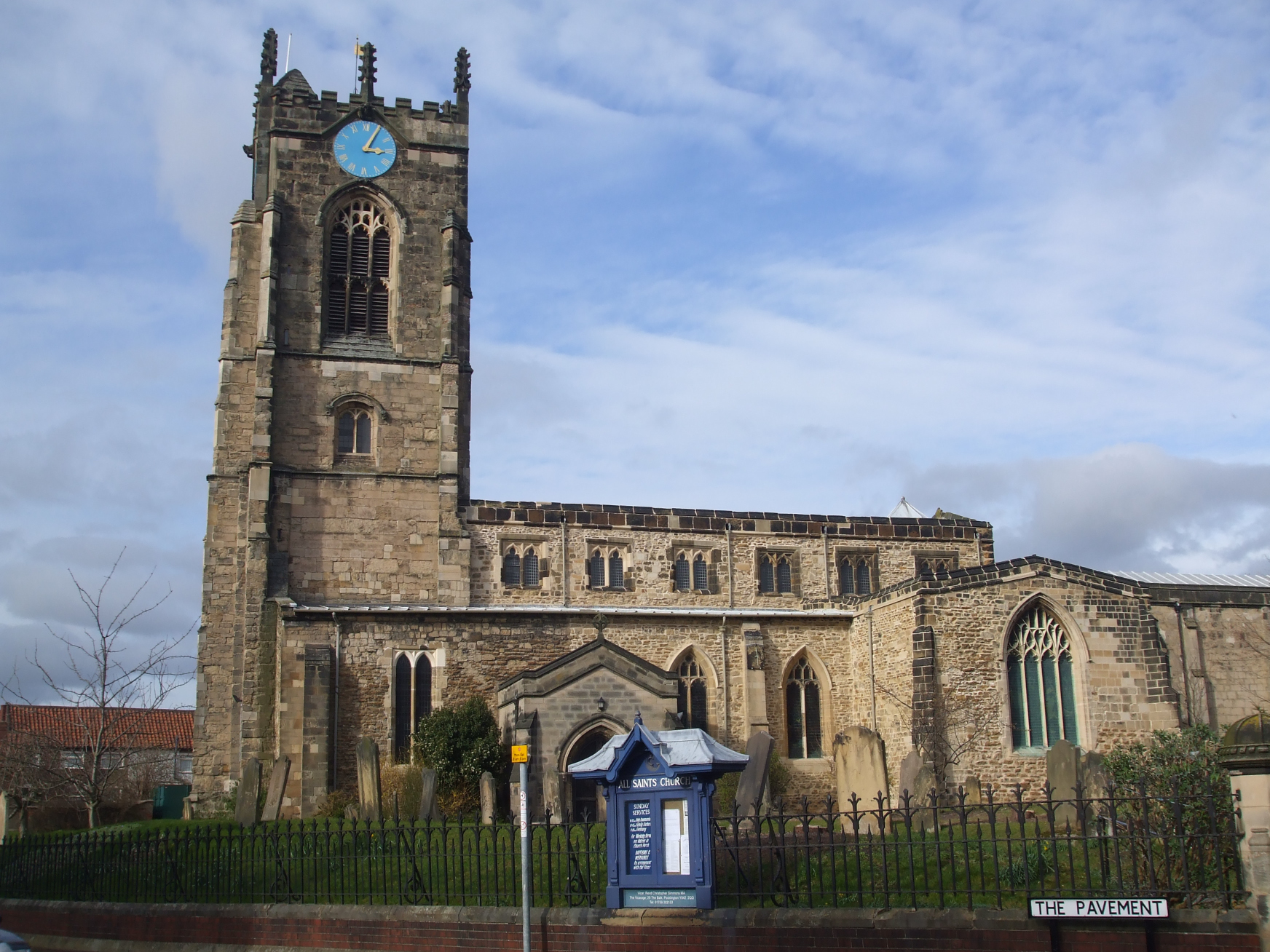
- All Saints' Church, Pocklington

- Location within the East Riding of Yorkshire
- 53.9306°N 0.7796°W
- OS grid reference: SE 80232 48974
- Country: England
- Denomination: Church of England
- Website: Official webpage

Administration
- Diocese: Diocese of York
- Archdeaconry: York
- Deanery: South Wold
- Benefice: Pocklington Wold
- Parish: Pocklington and Owsthorpe and Kilnwick Percy

Clergy
- Vicar: The Revd Dr Jacob Belder

Listed Building – Grade I
- Designated: 22 January 1967
- Reference no.: 1162006

All Saints' Church, Pocklington is the Anglican parish church for the town of Pocklington, East Riding of Yorkshire, England. It is also known locally as the Cathedral of the Wolds. It is an important Grade I listed building, dating mainly from the 12th to the 15th century. It is a constituent parish of the Diocese of York.

== History ==
The missionary St Paulinus likely established the first Christian church in Pocklington on his way from Goodmanham to found York Minster. Certainly, the Sotheby Cross, now in the churchyard, has the inscription "Paulinus here preached and celebrated AD627". The building's foundations go back to the Saxon era, and some fragments remain of the Norman church. However, most of the building dates from the late 12th to early 15th centuries.

The church clock, dating from 1841, has an unusual mechanism in that it uses only one train to strike the hours and chime the quarter hours. It was restored in 2004. Only one other church clock with a similar mechanism is known, that of St John's Church in Keswick, Cumbria.

Extensive repairs and alterations were made to the church in the late 19th century. Most of the stained glass dates from that time, as does the pulpit, with its two carved scenes showing the parable of the Good Samaritan and St Peter healing the man at the Beautiful Gate.

The All Saints Heritage Appeal Fund (also called 'Reveal and Restore') was launched on 29 September 2004 by the Appeal Patron, Lord Halifax, to raise £250,000. This money was needed for a complete re-ordering of the West end of the church to provide additional facilities, for extra space to accommodate larger numbers of people, and to display some significant historical features of the building more appropriately; this first phase of the work has been completed. The funds were also needed to repair crumbling areas of the church's exterior stonework.

During the 1890 renovation, a message detailing the work was sealed in a glass bottle, along with a newspaper of the time, and buried underneath the plinth of the medieval Sotheby Cross. Unearthed accidentally during repairs in 2005, the sealed message and a copy of the 1890 newspaper were re-buried in the same spot, along with a contemporary copy of the Pocklington Post.

== Stories from the past ==
In 1733, the celebrated Flying Man of Pocklington, Thomas Pelling, attempted to travel along a rope between the church and the Star Inn in the Market Square. He crashed to his death, fracturing his skull against the wall of the church following a misunderstanding with men working the windlass. He is buried where he fell at the east end of the church, where a plaque celebrates his memory.

== The Sotheby Cross ==
In the churchyard stands the Sotheby Cross. John Soteby was born in Pocklington in 1390, and the Sotheby Cross was made for him, or in his memory, in the 15th century.

It was rediscovered buried in the churchyard in 1835, since when it had stood inside the church. In 2006, it was reinstated in the churchyard, its location determined by reference to a drawing in an architectural journal from the 1880s. Matthias Garn, from Bugthorpe, was the stonemason who created the replica of the cross head out of Tadcaster limestone. The Sothebys can be traced back to Roger of Lincoln, born in 1302. They came to Pocklington in about 1380. One of John's descendants, James Sotheby, was both vicar of Pocklington and headmaster of the School in the 1620s. The most famous branch of the Sotheby family moved to Bishop Wilton and then to Hackney, London, and Sewardstone in Essex. They gave their name to Sotheby's, the famous international auctioneers of fine art.

== All Saints' Church today ==
The church continues its lively history of fellowship and local activities, and has links with Pocklington Church of England Infants' School. The Benefice of Pocklington Wold also includes the churches at Burnby, Great Givendale, Hayton, Huggate, Millington, and Nunburnholme.

The current vicar, the Reverend Dr Jacob Belder, was appointed on 22 September 2020.

== See also ==
- Grade I listed churches in the East Riding of Yorkshire
- Listed buildings in Pocklington
- History of Pocklington
- Pocklington School
