= St Mary's Church, East Cottingwith =

Church in the East Riding of Yorkshire, England

Coordinates: 53°52′26″N 0°55′54″W

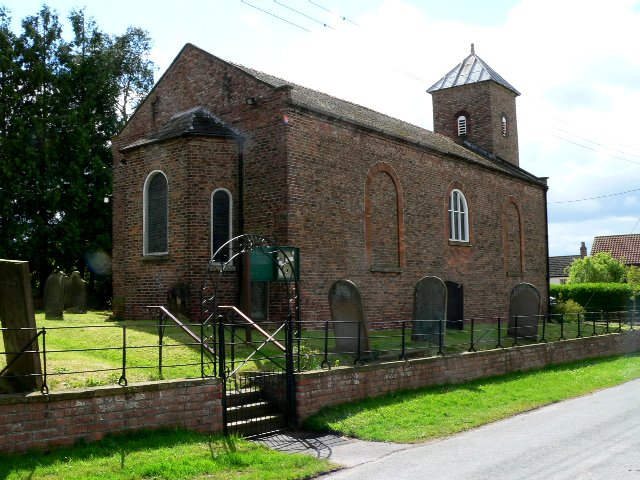
The church, in 2006

St Mary's Church is the parish church of East Cottingwith, a village in the East Riding of Yorkshire, in England.

The church was probably completed in 1786, replacing an earlier chapel. The window sills were raised in the 19th century, to match the one over the door. In 1851, the church could seat 176 worshippers and had a typical weekly attendance of 40. The building was grade II listed in 1967. In 2010, it was holding a service most Sundays, but was running an annual deficit.

The church is built of red-brown brick, with a stepped brick eaves cornice, and a slate roof with raised coped gables. It consists of a nave and a chancel in one unit, a canted apse at the east end, and a west tower. The tower has a plinth, a round-headed west window, round-headed bell openings, and a pyramidal lead roof. The doorway and windows have round heads under gauged brick arches. Inside, there is a hexagonal late-18th century pulpit.

== See also ==
- Listed buildings in Cottingwith
