= Kilnwick Percy =

Village in the East Riding of Yorkshire, England

Coordinates: 53°56′27″N 0°44′40″W

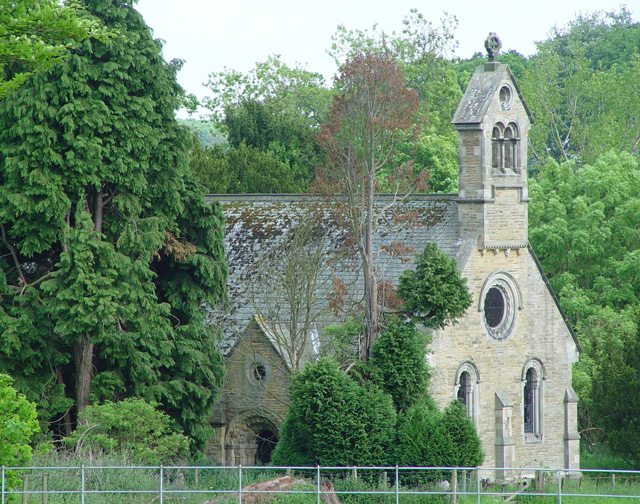
- St Helen’s Church, Kilnwick Percy

- Location within the East Riding of Yorkshire
- OS grid reference: SE825500
  - London: 170 mi (270 km) S
- Civil parish: Nunburnholme
- Unitary authority: East Riding of Yorkshire
- Ceremonial county: East Riding of Yorkshire
- Region: Yorkshire and the Humber
- Country: England
- Sovereign state: United Kingdom
- Post town: YORK
- Postcode district: YO42
- Dialling code: 01759
- Police: Humberside
- Fire: Humberside
- Ambulance: Yorkshire
- UK Parliament: Bridlington and The Wolds

Kilnwick Percy is a village and former civil parish, now in the parish of Nunburnholme, in the East Riding of Yorkshire, England. It is situated approximately 1.5 miles (2.4 km) north-east of Pocklington town centre, and to the north of the B1246 road. In 1931 the parish had a population of 69. On 1 April 1935 the parish was abolished and merged with Nunburnholme.

The name Kilnwick derives from the Old English Cyllawīc or Cyllaingaswīc, meaning 'Cylla's' or 'Cylla's people's trading settlement'. The village was held by the Percy family in the 12th century.

Kilnwick Percy Hall is a Grade II* listed country house built around 1845, formerly the home of Baron Hotham. It is now a Buddhist meditation and retreat centre.

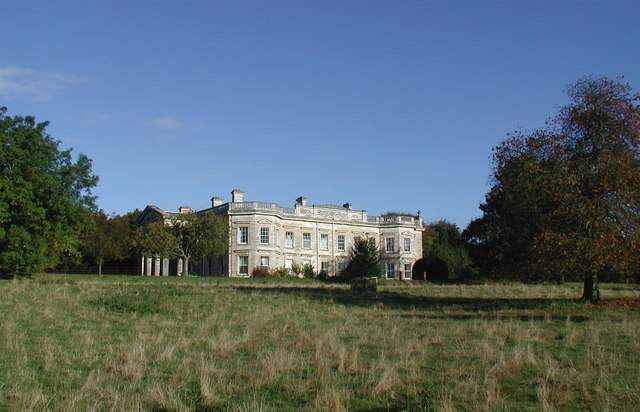
Kilnwick Percy Hall

The grounds of the hall include a lake and the disused St Helen's Church, Kilnwick Percy, built in the Norman style. The church is designated a Grade II listed building and is now recorded in the National Heritage List for England, maintained by Historic England.

In 1823 Kilnwick Percy was a civil parish in the Wapentake and Liberty of Holderness. The ecclesiastical parish was under the patronage of the Dean of York. Population at the time was 43.

In 1994, The KP Club, officially known as Kilnwick Percy Resort & Golf Club, was built. It features 120 acres of Yorkshire Wolds countryside, featuring an 18 hole, par 70 golf course, as well as holiday lodges, a spa, restaurant, and function rooms.

== See also ==
- Listed buildings in Nunburnholme
