= Melbourne, East Riding of Yorkshire =

Village and civil parish in the East Riding of Yorkshire, England

Coordinates: 53.887011°N 0.857140°W

Melbourne
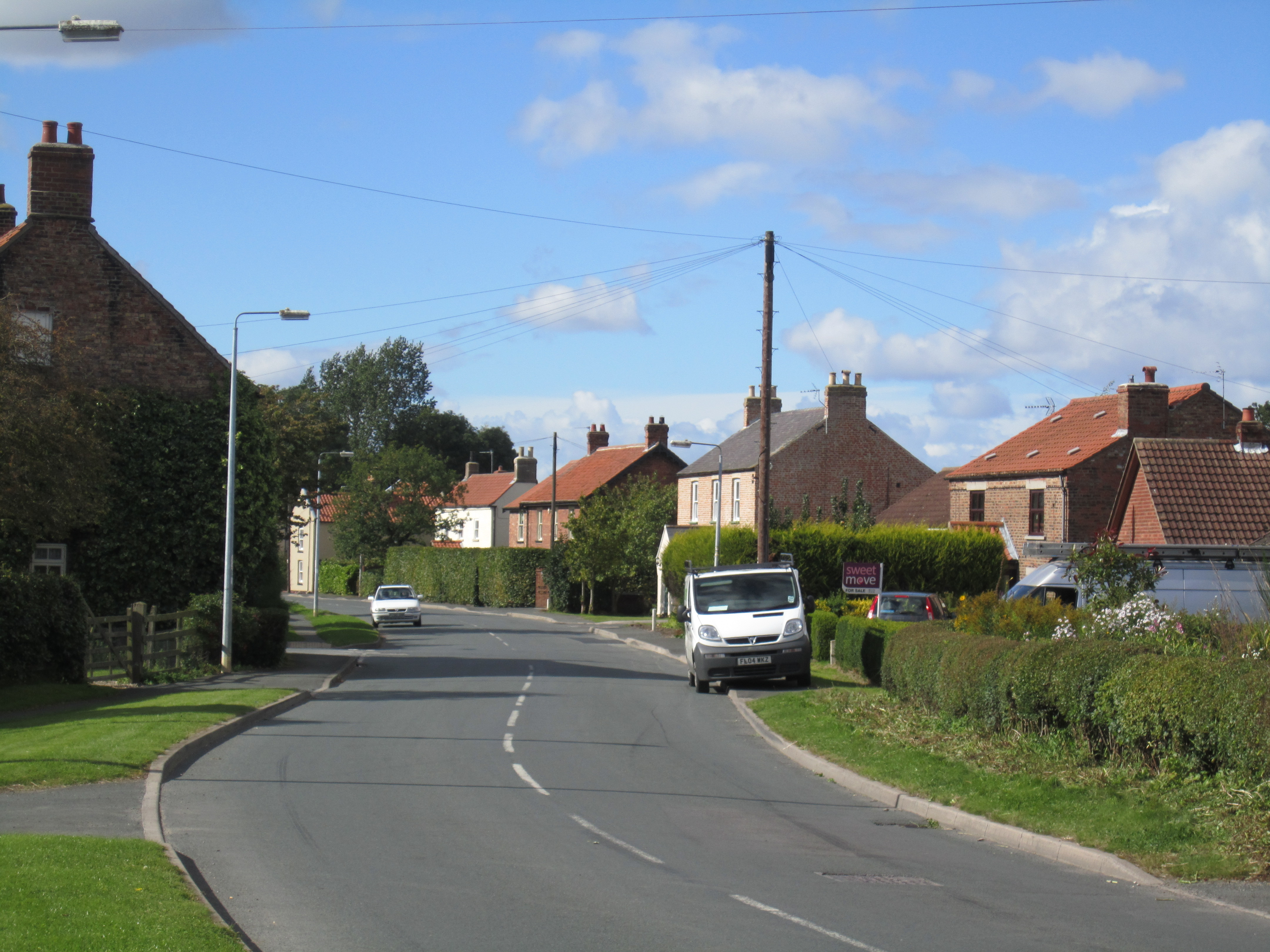
- Main Street, Melbourne

- Location within the East Riding of Yorkshire
- Population: 793 (2011 census)
- OS grid reference: SE752440
  - London: 165 mi (266 km) S
- Civil parish: Melbourne
- Unitary authority: East Riding of Yorkshire
- Ceremonial county: East Riding of Yorkshire
- Region: Yorkshire and the Humber
- Country: England
- Sovereign state: United Kingdom
- Post town: YORK
- Postcode district: YO42
- Dialling code: 01759
- Police: Humberside
- Fire: Humberside
- Ambulance: Yorkshire
- UK Parliament: Goole and Pocklington

Melbourne is a village and civil parish in the East Riding of Yorkshire, England. It is situated approximately 8 miles (13 km) west of the market town of Market Weighton and 4.5 miles (7 km) south-west of the market town of Pocklington. The village lies just to the south of the Pocklington Canal.

According to the 2011 UK census, Melbourne parish had a population of 793, an increase on the 2001 UK census figure of 755.

In 1823, Melbourne was in the civil parish of Thorton and the Wapentake of Harthill. Within the village was a Wesleyan and a Primitive Methodist chapel. Population at the time was 437. Occupations included two blacksmiths, two shoemakers, a joiner, a wheelwright & machine maker, a bricklayer, a cattle dealer, a shopkeeper, a brick & tile maker, and fourteen farmers, one of whom was the landlord of The Cross Keys public house. Resident in the village were two gentlemen and a yeoman, and Lieutenant General James Wharton, who was a Justice of the peace and the Commissioner of Taxes for the East and North Ridings. A carrier operated between the village and York once a week.

The name Melbourne derives from the Old English middelburna meaning 'middle stream'.

== Community ==
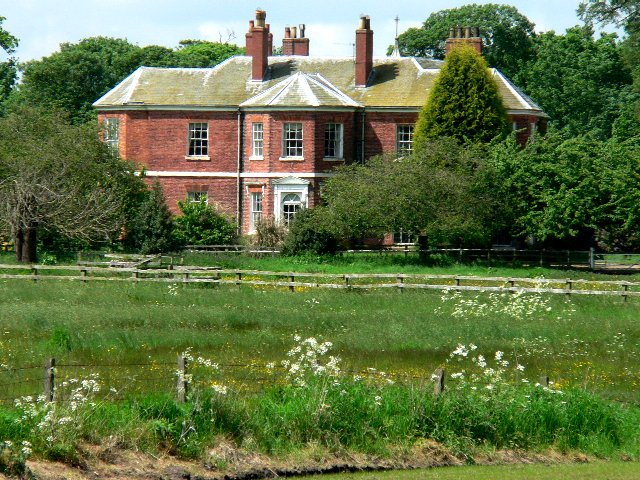
Melbourne Hall

Farming is a main economic driver in the area, however an agricultural machinery business employs about 40 people.

Amenities in Melbourne include a village hall, a playing field, a public house, and a shop.

The Pocklington Canal Amenity Society runs boat trips from the Melbourne Arm of the canal, on its trip boat New Horizons.

The village school is Melbourne Community Primary School. A pre-school, which operated from the village hall, closed in December 2013.

A sports and playing field association manage the village's playing field at the east end of Main Street. The playing field has a pavilion, scout hut, children's play area, tennis court, and football and cricket pitches. Sports' clubs in the village include a cricket and a football club, both based at the playing fields, and a bowling Club at the village hall.

== See also ==
- Listed buildings in Melbourne, East Riding of Yorkshire

== Gallery ==
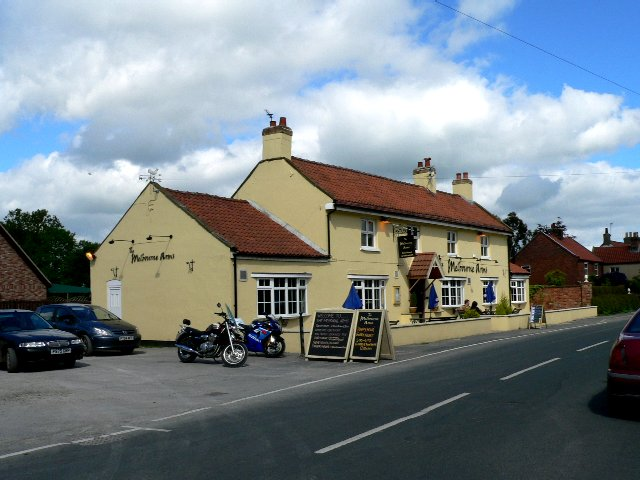
The Melbourne Arms

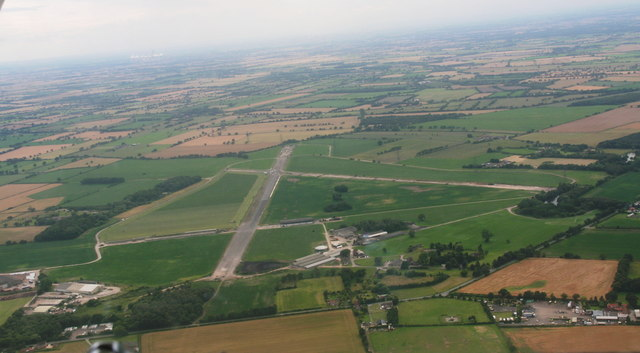
Former RAF Melbourne

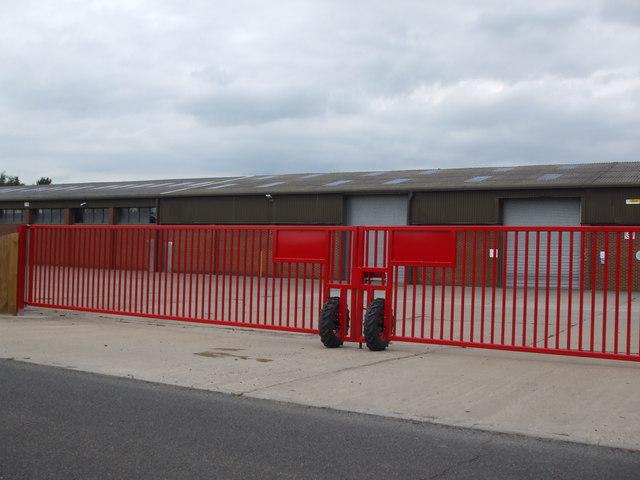
Sumo Ltd Manufacturing Plant
