= Listed buildings in Nunburnholme =

Nunburnholme is a civil parish in the county of the East Riding of Yorkshire, England. It contains six listed buildings that are recorded in the National Heritage List for England. Of these, one is listed at Grade I, the highest of the three grades, one is at Grade II*, the middle grade, and the others are at Grade II, the lowest grade. The parish contains the village of Nunburnholme, the hamlet of Kilnwick Percy, and the surrounding countryside. The listed buildings consist of two churches, a farmhouse, and a country house with its associated lodge and ice house.

== Key ==
Grade	Criteria
I	Buildings of exceptional interest, sometimes considered to be internationally important
II*	Particularly important buildings of more than special interest
II	Buildings of national importance and special interest

== Buildings ==
Name and location	Photograph	Date	Notes	Grade
St James' Church; 53.91935°N 0.71072°W		12th century	The church has been altered and extended through the centuries, including alterations and a restoration in 1872–73 by George Gilbert Scott Jr., and the tower was rebuilt in 1901–02 by Temple Moore. The church is built in stone with tile roofs, and consists of a nave, a south porch, a chancel and a west tower. The tower has a chamfered plinth, diagonal buttresses, chamfered string courses, a two-light pointed west window with a hood mould, two-light square-headed bell openings with hood moulds, and an embattled parapet. The tower arch is Norman with two orders, and there is a reset Norman window in the north wall of the nave.	I
Garforth Farmhouse; 53.92875°N 0.69165°W	—	Mid-18th century	The farmhouse is in red brick, with a floor band, a dentilled brick eaves cornice, and a pantile roof. There are two storeys, four bays, and later extensions. The doorway has a rectangular fanlight, and is under a segmental brick arch. The ground floor windows are tripartite under segmental brick relieving arches, and on the upper floor are tripartite windows and horizontally sliding sashes.	II
Ice house, Kilnwick Percy Hall; 53.93847°N 0.74805°W	—	Early 19th century	The ice house is in the grounds of the house, to its west. It is in red brick, and consists of a tunnel leading to a domed chamber under a mound of soil.	II
Lodge, Kilnwick Percy Hall; 53.93384°N 0.75583°W		c. 1840	The lodge at the entrance to the grounds of the house is in stone with a slate roof. There is a cruciform plan, one storey, and a main front of three bays. At the end of each arm of the cross is a tetrastyle Ionic portico with a pediment. In two of the angles are porches with French windows, and the other windows are sashes in architraves.	II
Kilnwick Percy Hall; 53.93835°N 0.74357°W		c. 1845	A country house, probably with an 18th-century core, in stone on a moulded plinth, with a deep moulded eaves cornice, a balustraded parapet with pilasters, and tile roofs. There are two storeys, and the main front has six bays. On the front is a giant tetrastyle Ionic portico with a coffered ceiling, and a pediment containing an elaborate achievement. The doorway has pilasters, and the windows are sashes. The park front has twelve bays, the outer three bays forming polygonal bay windows with pediments over the central bays.	II*
St Helen's Church; 53.93787°N 0.74184°W		1865	The 12th-century church was rebuilt in elaborate Norman style reusing some earlier material. It is built in sandstone with limestone dressings, and consists of a nave, a north porch and a chancel. At the west end is a corbelled-out gabled bellcote with two round-arched openings, below which is a circular window and two round-arched windows. The restored north door has three orders, and a corbel table incorporating original carved corbels.	II
