= Listed buildings in Seaton Ross =

Seaton Ross is a civil parish in the county of the East Riding of Yorkshire, England. It contains eight listed buildings that are recorded in the National Heritage List for England. All the listed buildings are designated at Grade II, the lowest of the three grades, which is applied to "buildings of national importance and special interest". The parish contains the village of Seaton Ross and the surrounding countryside. Apart from a church and a disused windmill, all the listed buildings are houses.

== Buildings ==
Name and location	Photograph	Date	Notes
Seaton Old Hall; 53.84647°N 0.81889°W	—	Late 17th century	The house is in colourwashed brick on a moulded plinth, with a stepped brick eaves cornice, and a pantile roof. There are two storeys and three bays, the middle bay projecting and containing a doorway in a round opening with moulded imposts, over which is a moulded band. The original window heads survive and consist of segmental and triangular pediments. The windows are sashes.
House opposite West End; 53.86187°N 0.81826°W		Early 18th century	The house was raised in the 19th century. It is in orange brick with a tile roof, two storeys and three bays. On the ground floor is a doorway and sash windows. The windows on the upper floor are horizontally sliding sashes, and all the windows have segmental heads.
House to the left of West View; 53.86505°N 0.81926°W		Mid-18th century	A house, later a pair of cottages, in orange brick, with a pantile roof. There are two storeys and three bays, and on the front are two doorways. The window on the right bay of the upper floor is a horizontally sliding sash window, the other windows are casements, and the ground floor windows and the right doorway are under segmental brick arches. On the upper floor of the left bay is a large painted sundial with a painted timber gnomon on wrought iron stays.
Mains Farmhouse; 53.86106°N 0.81279°W	—	Late 18th century	The house is in red brick, and has a Roman tile roof with tumbled-in brick to plain close verges. There are two storeys and three bays. The central doorway has a fanlight, the windows are sashes, and the ground floor openings have segmental brick arches.
St Edmund's Church; 53.86234°N 0.81357°W		1788	The church, which was built on the site of an earlier church, was restored in 1908 by Temple Moore. It is built in orange brick, with stone dressings and a tile roof. The church consists of a four-bay nave, a single-bay chancel, and a west tower. The tower has two stages, a small round-headed window on the lower floor, and similar bell openings, all under gauged brick arches. Above the bell openings is a datestone, a stepped brick eaves cornice, and a pyramidal roof with a weathervane. The doorway and the windows on the nave are round-headed under round gauged brick arches. The chancel south window has a cambered arch, and at the east end is a Venetian window. Above the doorway is a dated and inscribed sundial.
West View; 53.86499°N 0.81910°W	—	Mid-late 18th to early 19th century	The house is in brick, with a stepped brick eaves cornice, and a pantile roof with raised coped gables and shaped kneelers. There are two storeys and attics, and three bays. The central doorway has a fanlight, the windows are sashes, and all the openings have flat gauged brick arches with keystones. On the right gable end are four blank windows, all with flat gauged brick arches and keystones.
Old Mill; 53.86623°N 0.82369°W		Late 18th to early 19th century	The disused windmill is in tarred brick. It consists of a tapering circular tower with three storeys, containing a doorway and square window openings, all with segmental heads.
Rose Farmhouse; 53.85522°N 0.81493°W		Early 19th century	The house is in brown brick, with a timber modillion eaves cornice, and a hipped slate roof. There are two storeys and three bays. In the centre is a doorway with a reeded doorcase and a fanlight, and the windows are sashes, those on the ground floor with wedge lintels.
