= Devonshire Mill =

Mill in Pocklington, East Riding of Yorkshire, England, UK

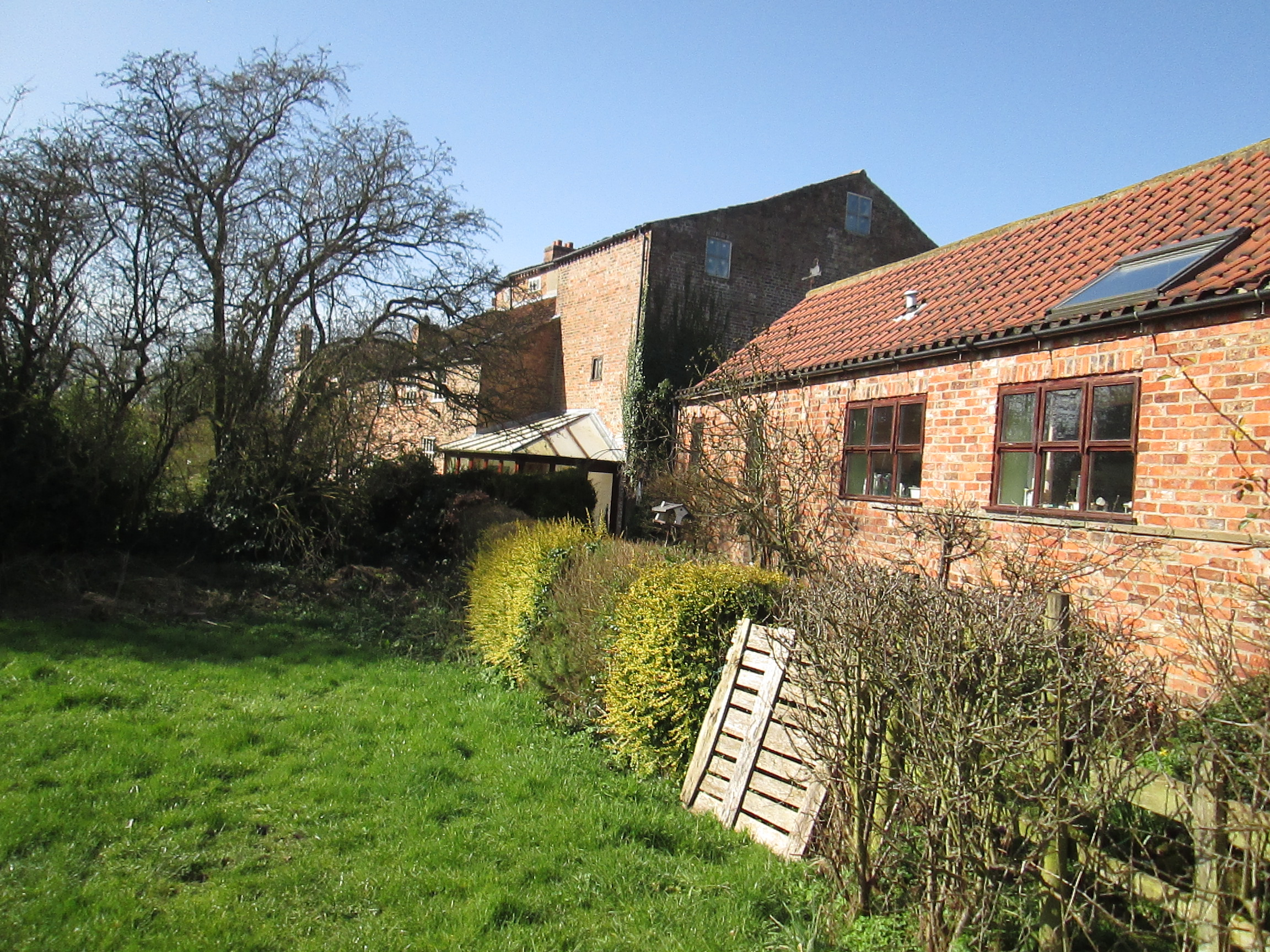
The building, in 2017

Devonshire Mill is a historic building in Pocklington, a town in the East Riding of Yorkshire, in England.

The watermill was built on Pocklington Beck in 1808, to mill corn. It had a breastshot waterwheel, then in 1893 a steam engine was installed, and in 1905 an oil-powered engine. The mill closed in the mid-20th century, but much of the machinery survived, along with two pairs of millstones and the 14 feet (4.3 m) diameter wheel. The building was grade II listed in 1985. Although derelict for a period, it was later converted into a house, with an organic garden.

The building is constructed of brown brick with a pantile roof. There are three storeys and five bays. On the ground floor are two doorways. Above the doorway on the second bay is a taking-in door, over which is a two-storey lucarne with a gable and bargeboards. The windows are sashes under segmental brick arches.

== See also ==
- Listed buildings in Pocklington
