= Kilnwick Percy Hall =

Country house in the East Riding of Yorkshire, England

Coordinates: 53°56′18″N 0°44′37″W

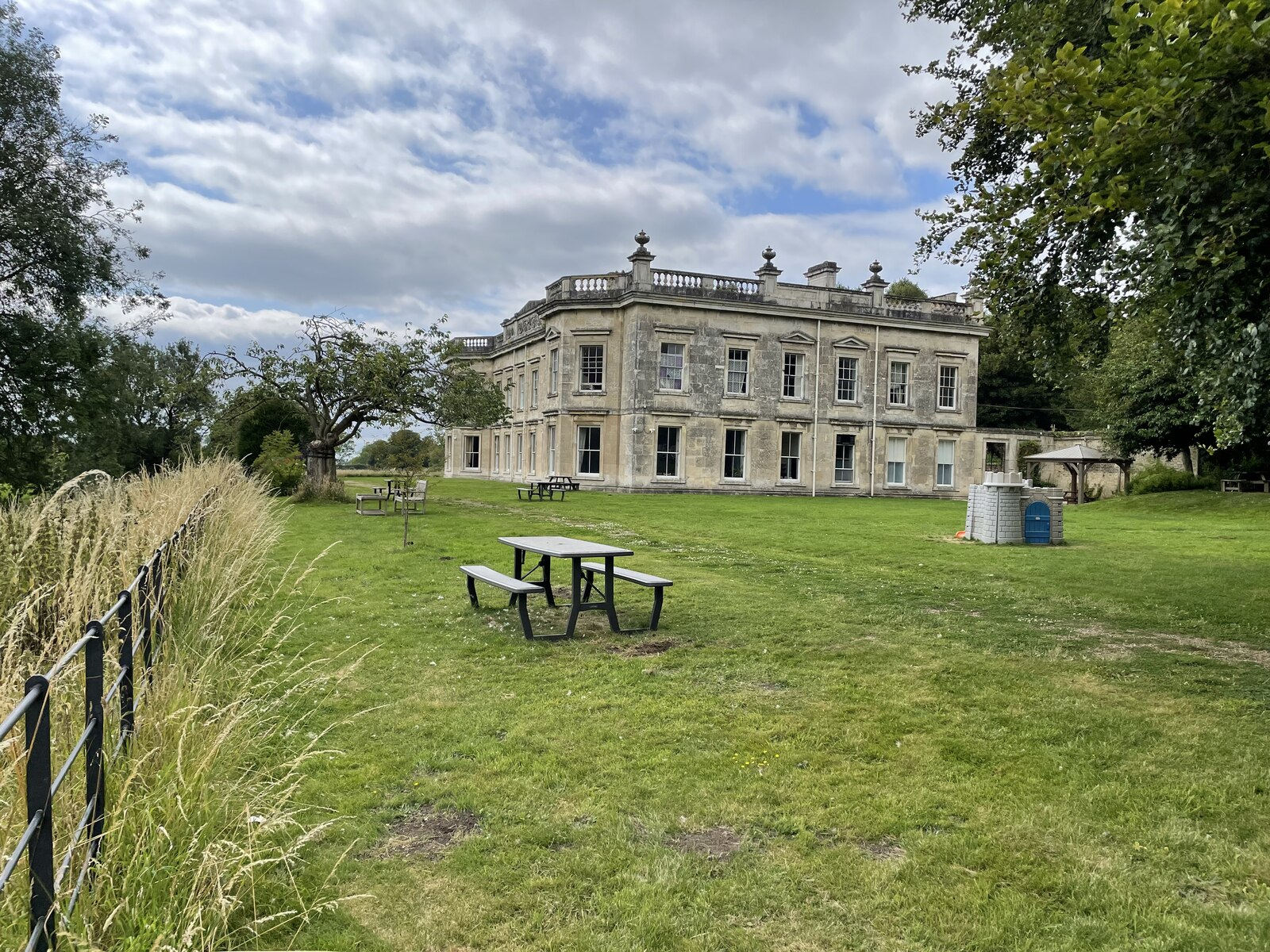
The building, in 2024

Kilnwick Percy Hall is a historic building near Nunburnholme, a village in the East Riding of Yorkshire, in England.

There was a manor house at Kilnwick Percy by 1563, when it was purchased by Thomas Wood. Wood rebuilt the house in 1574. It was again rebuilt in the early 18th century, by Edmund Anderson, and was remodelled in 1784 by Robert Denison. In 1840, the estate was bought by Arthur Duncombe and he rebuilt it once more, perhaps retaining the older core of rooms. The house was sold again in 1947, following which a substantial part of it was demolished. In 1954, it was purchased by Henry Frederick Hotham, 7th Baron Hotham, who used it as a farmhouse. In 1986, it was again sold, and became the Madhyamaka Kadampa Buddhist Centre.

The giant portico

The house has been grade II* listed since 1967. It is built of stone on a moulded plinth, with a deep moulded eaves cornice, a balustraded parapet with pilasters, and tile roofs. There are two storeys, and the main front has six bays. On the front is a giant tetrastyle Ionic portico with a coffered ceiling, and a pediment containing an elaborate achievement. The doorway has pilasters, and the windows are sashes. The park front has twelve bays, the outer three bays forming polygonal bay windows with pediments over the central bays. Inside, the ballroom has ornate rococo decoration, including panel and a series of paintings. The main staircase has been relocated inside the house but retains its basic form.

== See also ==
- Grade II* listed buildings in the East Riding of Yorkshire
- Listed buildings in Nunburnholme
