= Nunburnholme Priory =

Former priory in Nunburnholme, Yorkshire, England

Coordinates: 53.9260°N 0.7012°W

Nunburnholme Priory was a priory of Benedictine nuns in the East Riding of Yorkshire, England. It was founded during the reign of Henry II of England by an ancestor of Robert de Merlay, lord of Morpeth. Except for its demesne, it possessed only little property in its surroundings. In 1313 the prioress claimed the monastery of Seton in Coupland as a cell of Nunburnholme. In 1521 only five nuns and the prioress lived here, and on 11 August 1536 the house was suppressed. It was valued as the poorest and smallest of the Benedictine nunneries in Yorkshire surviving until then.

The priory was northeast of the village of Nunburnholme, between Nun's Walk and Back Lane. The site of the priory is a Scheduled Monument, described as featuring "extensive earthworks ... across the whole of the site" and "a group of well preserved but now dry fishponds".
