= Thornton, East Riding of Yorkshire =

Village and civil parish in the East Riding of Yorkshire, England

Coordinates: 53.898317°N 0.845721°W

Thornton
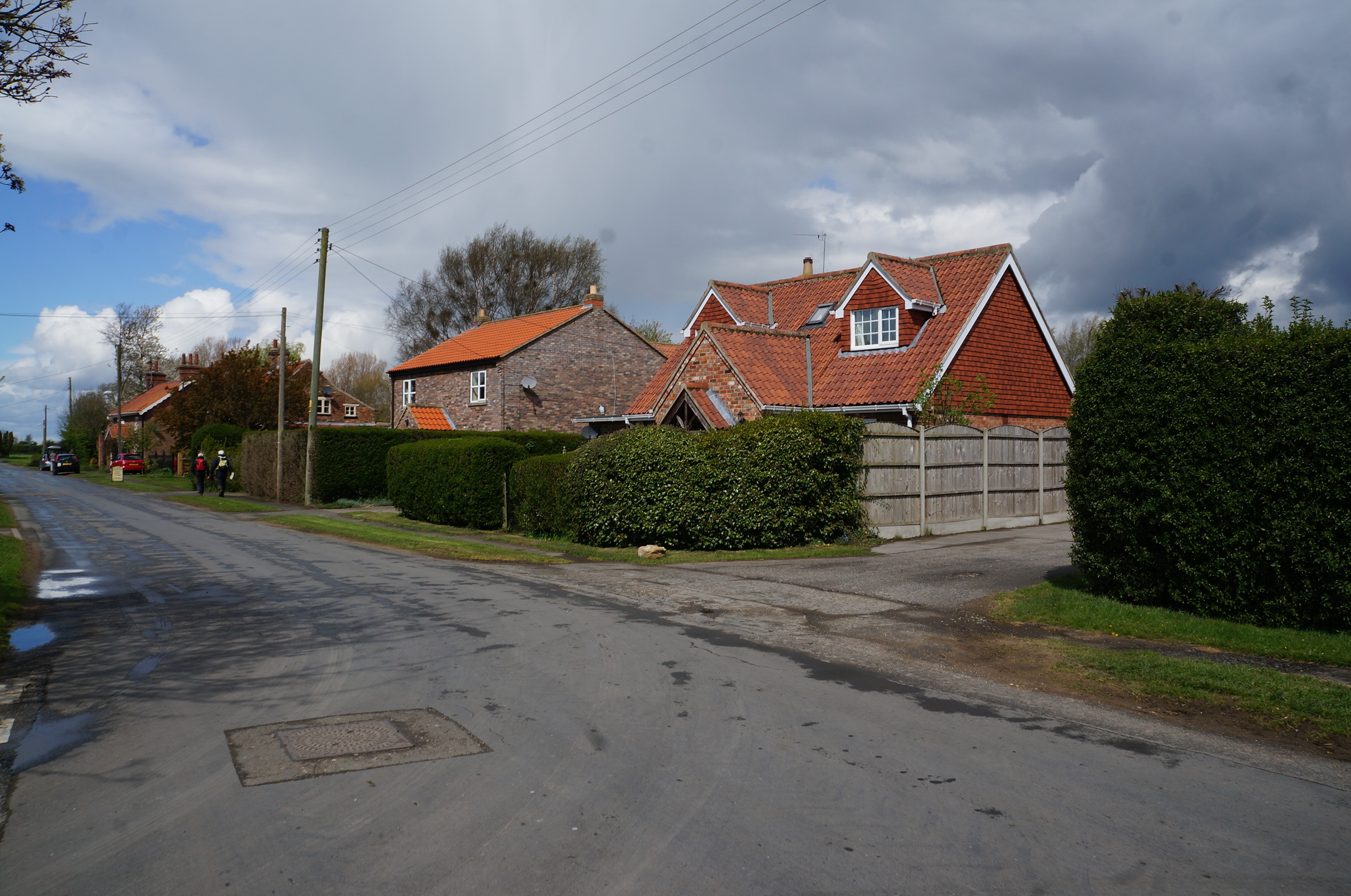
- Street in Thornton

- Location within the East Riding of Yorkshire
- Population: 138 (2011 census)
- OS grid reference: SE759453
- Civil parish: Thornton
- Unitary authority: East Riding of Yorkshire
- Ceremonial county: East Riding of Yorkshire
- Region: Yorkshire and the Humber
- Country: England
- Sovereign state: United Kingdom
- Post town: YORK
- Postcode district: YO42
- Dialling code: 01759
- Police: Humberside
- Fire: Humberside
- Ambulance: Yorkshire
- UK Parliament: Bridlington and The Wolds

Thornton is a village and civil parish in the East Riding of Yorkshire, England. It is situated approximately 3.5 miles (5.6 km) south-west of the town of Pocklington and 5 miles (8 km) north-west of the village of Holme-on-Spalding-Moor. It lies just to the north of the Pocklington Canal.

According to the 2011 UK census, Thornton parish had a population of 138, exactly the same as on the 2001 UK census.

The village was historically sometimes distinguished by the suffix "in Spalding Moor".

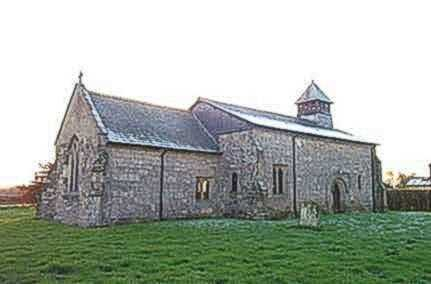
St Michael's Church, Thornton

The parish church of St Michael on Main Street is designated a Grade II* listed building.

The other listed structures in the parish are Walbut Lock and Walbut Bridge on the Pocklington Canal, both of which are Grade II listed.

Recent archaeological excavations at Thornton in advance of a renewable energy project revealed an extensive site of iron smelting, firmly established during the Middle Iron Age and likely linked to the Arras culture.

== See also ==
- Listed buildings in Thornton, East Riding of Yorkshire
