= East Cottingwith =

Village in the East Riding of Yorkshire, England

Coordinates: 53°52′20″N 0°55′50″W

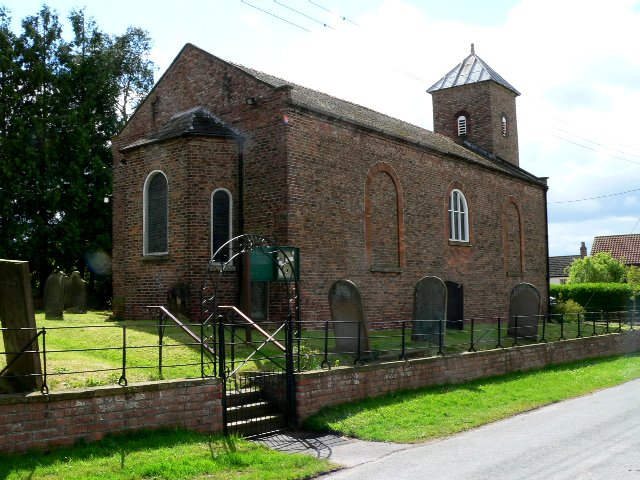
- St Mary’s Church

- Location within the East Riding of Yorkshire
- Population: 349 (2011 census)
- OS grid reference: SE703423
  - London: 165 mi (266 km) S
- Civil parish: Cottingwith
- Unitary authority: East Riding of Yorkshire
- Ceremonial county: East Riding of Yorkshire
- Region: Yorkshire and the Humber
- Country: England
- Sovereign state: United Kingdom
- Post town: YORK
- Postcode district: YO42
- Dialling code: 01759
- Police: Humberside
- Fire: Humberside
- Ambulance: Yorkshire
- UK Parliament: Goole and Pocklington

East Cottingwith is a village and former civil parish, now in the parish of Cottingwith, in the East Riding of Yorkshire, England. It lies on the former Derwent Navigation (canal), and approximately 9 miles (14 km) north-west of the market town of Howden and 7 miles (11 km) south-west of the market town of Pocklington. The village is 1 mile (1.6 km) west of the B1228 road and just east of the River Derwent. In 1931 the civil parish had a population of 185. East Cottingwith was formerly a township and chapelry in the parish of Aughton, from 1866 East Cottingwith was a civil parish in its own right, on 1 April 1935 the civil parish was merged with Storwood to create Cottingwith.

The civil parish of Cottingwith is formed by the village of East Cottingwith and the hamlet of Storwood. According to the 2011 UK Census, Cottingwith parish had a population of 349, an increase on the 2001 UK Census figure of 290.

St Mary's Church, East Cottingwith is a Grade II listed building.

The name Cottingwith derives from the Old English Cottingwīc meaning the 'trading settlement connected with Cott' or 'Cotta'. Wīc was replaced by the Old Norse vithr meaning 'wood' later on.

== See also ==
- Listed buildings in Cottingwith

== Gallery ==
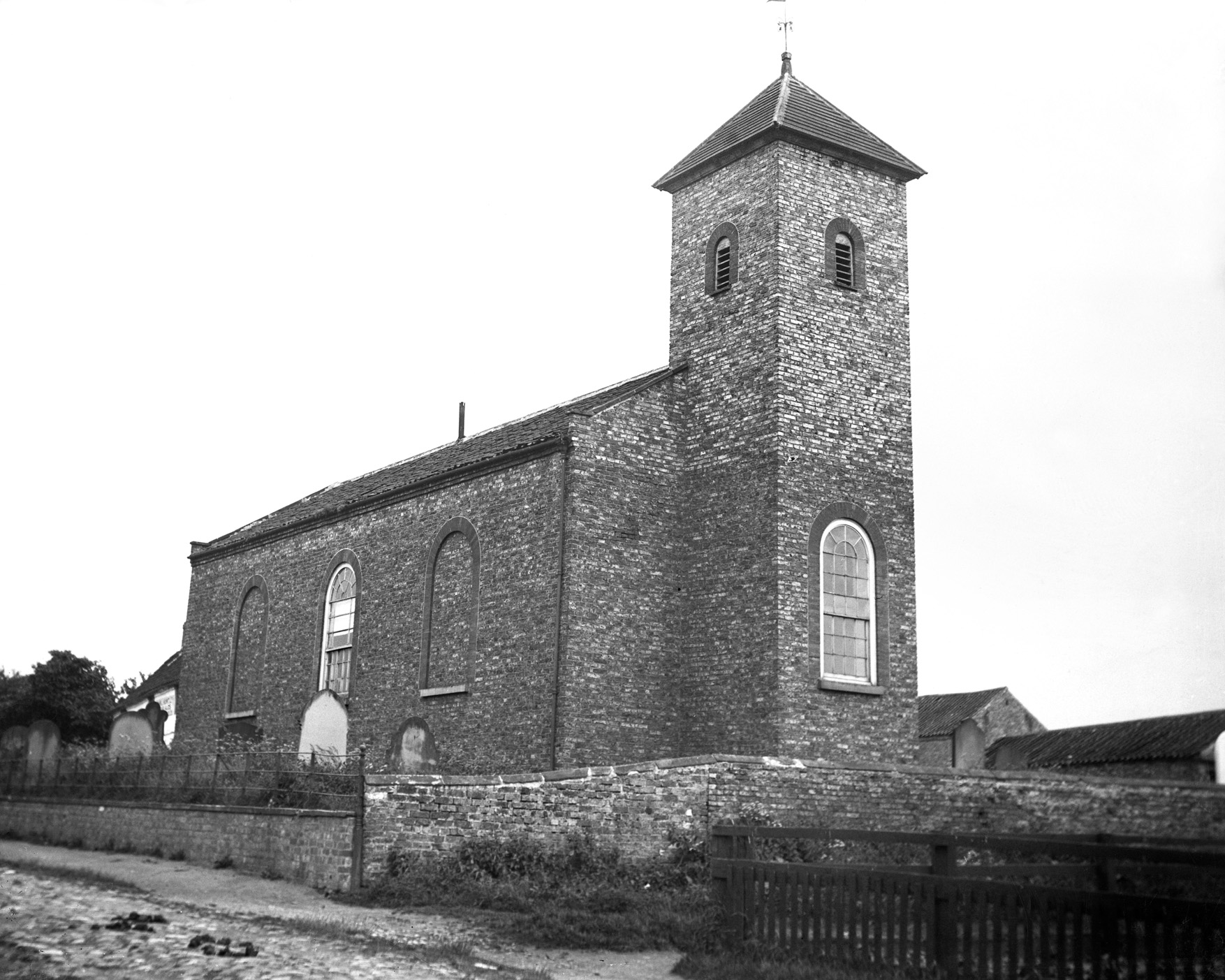
St Mary's Church, 1900–1912

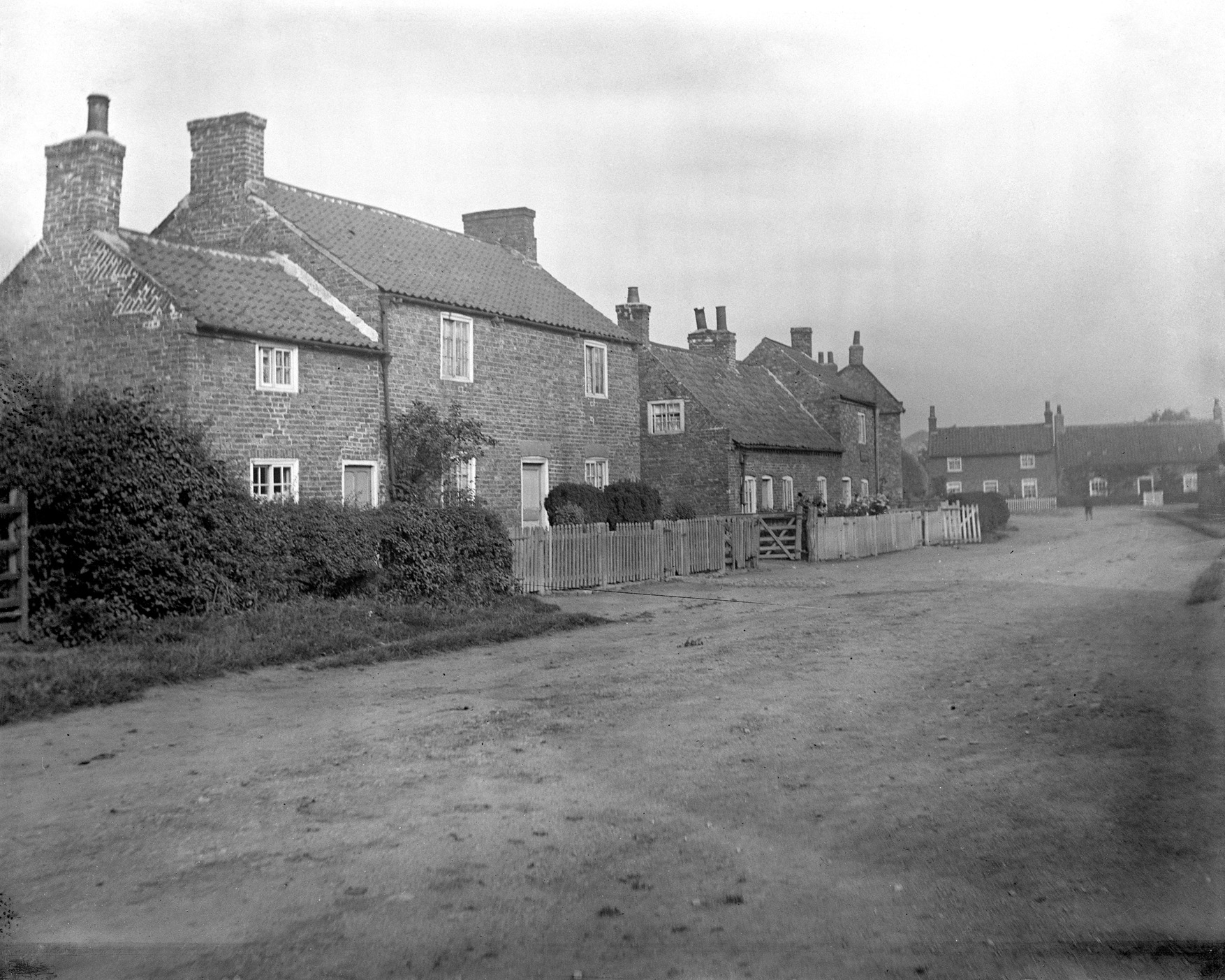
The village street, 1900–1912

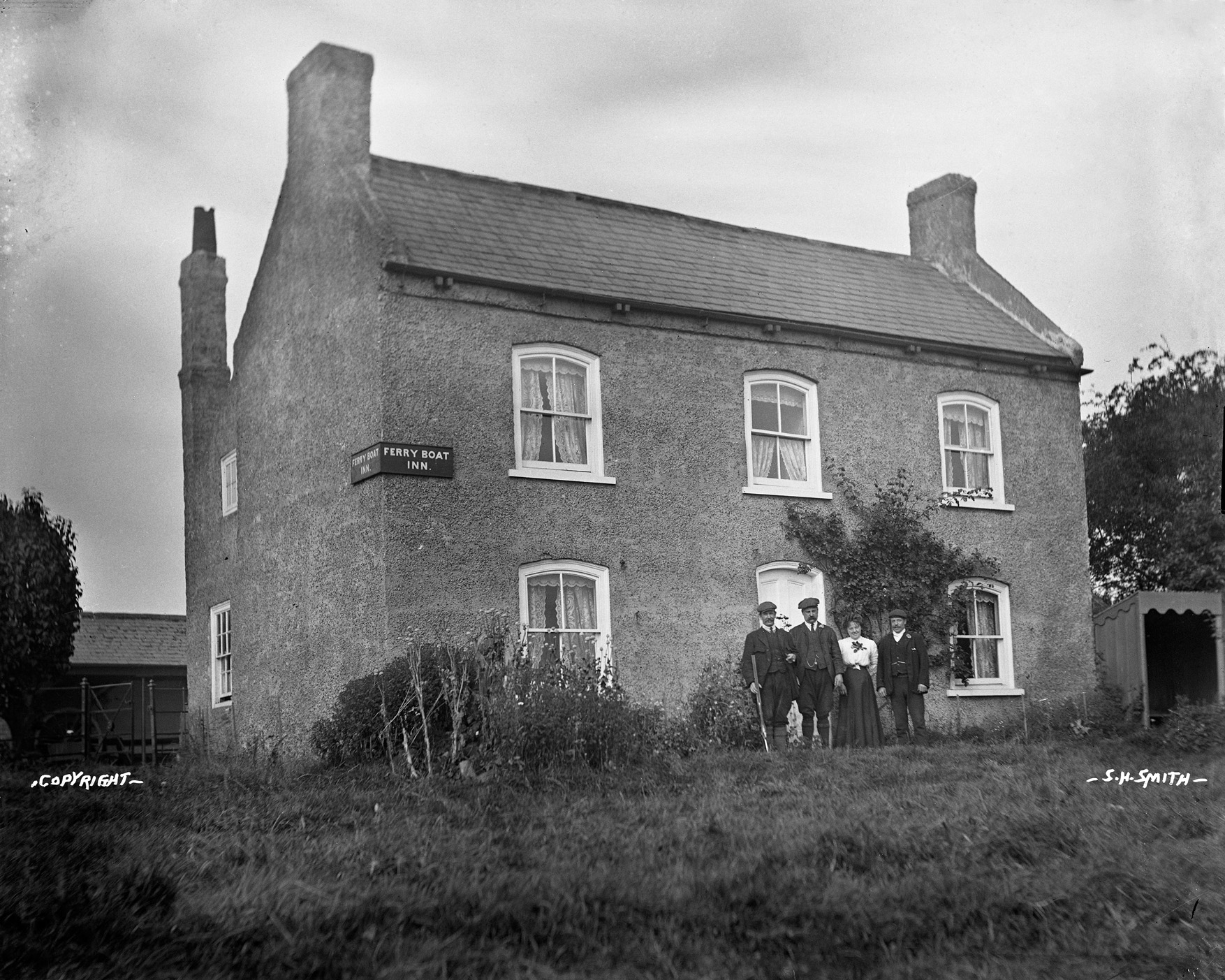
Ferry Boat Inn, 1900–1912

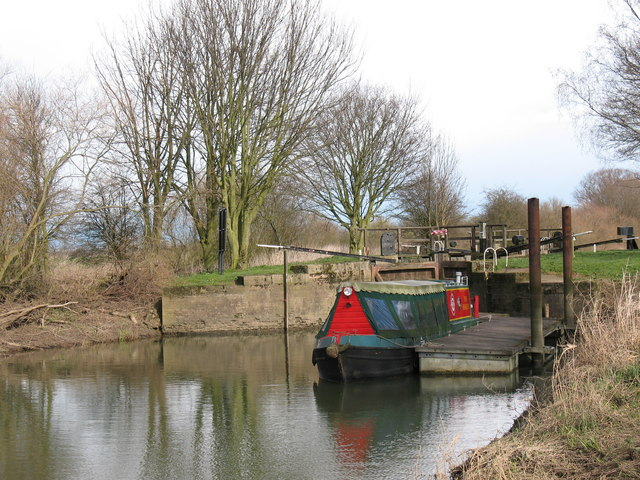
Narrowboat at Cottingwith Lock, near East Cottingwith

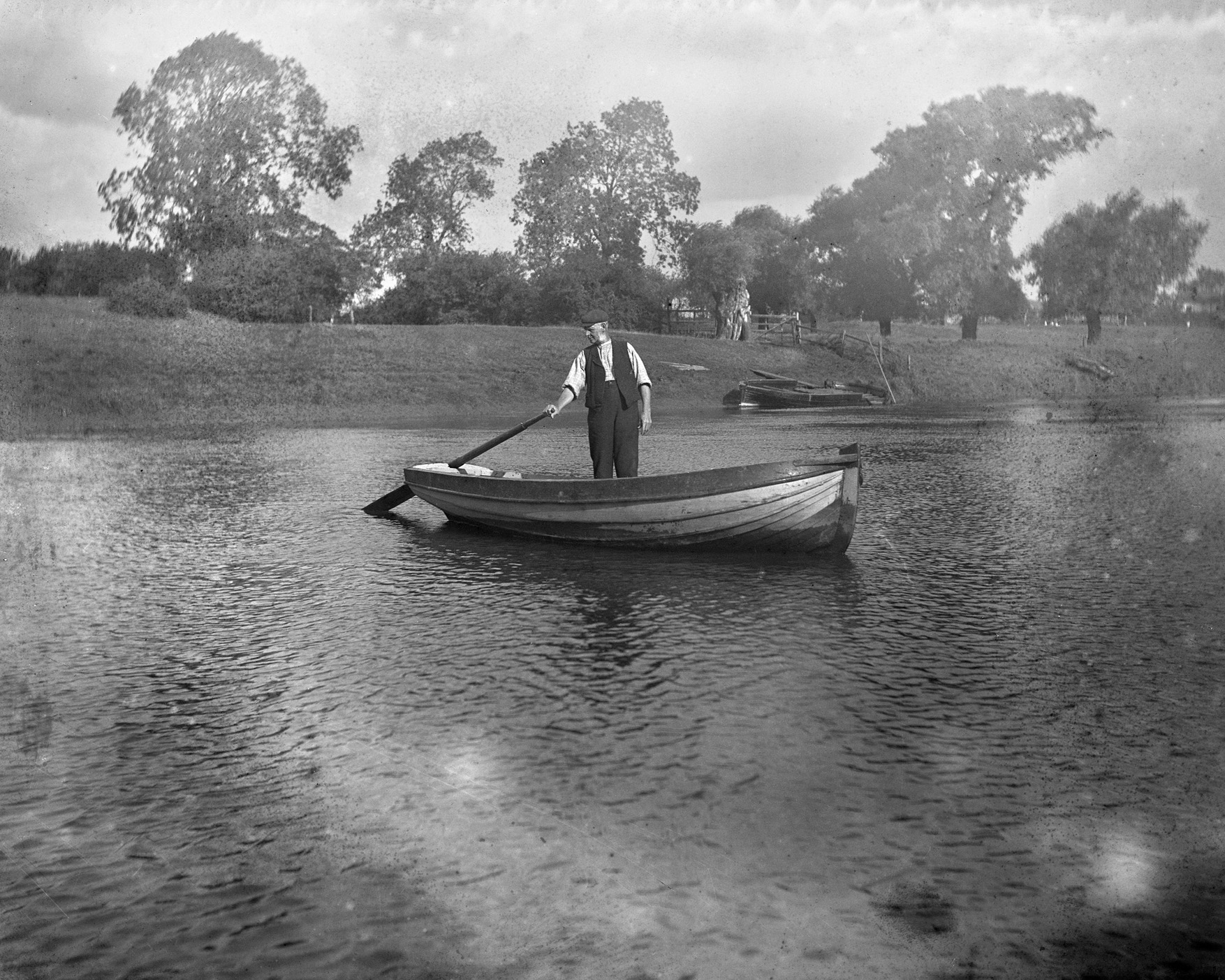
View of the river near East Cottingwith, 1900–1912
