= Nunburnholme =

Village and civil parish in the East Riding of Yorkshire, England

Coordinates: 53°55′20″N 0°42′28″W

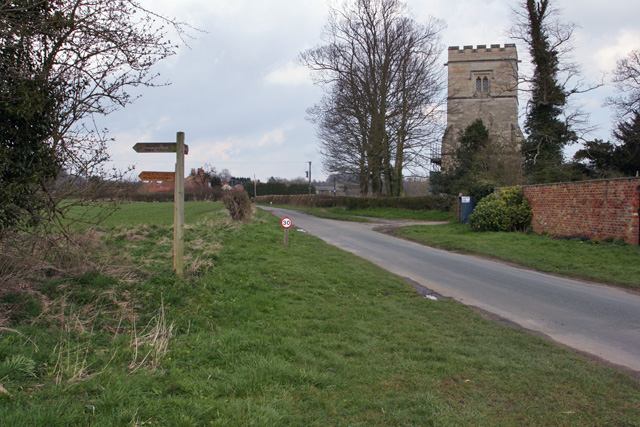
- The road into Nunburnholme

- Location within the East Riding of Yorkshire
- Population: 234 (2011 census)
- OS grid reference: SE849480
  - London: 170 mi (270 km) S
- Civil parish: Nunburnholme
- Unitary authority: East Riding of Yorkshire
- Ceremonial county: East Riding of Yorkshire
- Region: Yorkshire and the Humber
- Country: England
- Sovereign state: United Kingdom
- Post town: YORK
- Postcode district: YO42
- Dialling code: 01759
- Police: Humberside
- Fire: Humberside
- Ambulance: Yorkshire
- UK Parliament: Bridlington and The Wolds

Nunburnholme is a village and civil parish in the East Riding of Yorkshire, England. It is approximately 3 miles (5 km) east of the market town of Pocklington. The civil parish is formed by the village of Nunburnholme and the hamlet of Kilnwick Percy. According to the 2011 UK census, Nunburnholme parish had a population of 234, a decrease on the 2001 UK census figure of 253.

Nunburnholme derives its name from the Old English Burnholme (“burn” = spring, stream; “holm” = island in a river, and was variously spelt Brunnum, Brunham and Brunne in medieval times. The prefix “Nun-“ was added some time before the 16th century with reference to Nunburnholme Priory.

Nunburnholme was laid waste during the Harrying of the North in 1069–70 and was still deserted in 1086. The entry for the manor of Brunham in the Domesday Book reads:

"Terra Tainorum Regis. East Riding. Hessle Hundred. Manerium. In Brunham, Morcar, Turvet and Turchil had 11 carucates of taxable land. There is land for six ploughs. One carucate is soke in Pocklington. Forne holds it of the King, and it is waste."

The Anglican St James' Church, Nunburnholme is a Grade I listed building, noted for its former incumbents the Reverend Francis Orpen Morris, author of works on natural history, and his son, the Rev. Marmaduke Charles Frederick Morris, antiquarian and author.

During restoration in 1872–7 two sections of an important late Anglo-Saxon cross-shaft were discovered walled up in the church. The Nunburnholme Cross now stands within the church, its two sections incorrectly mounted back to front. The highly ornamented faces of the cross-shaft comprise Anglo-Saxon Christian figures, an unusual haloed warrior in profile, and later pagan Viking and Norman additions.

The Yorkshire Wolds Way National Trail, a long-distance footpath, passes through the village, as does the 60-mile (97 km) Wilberforce Way, which runs from Kingston upon Hull to York.

In 1823 Nunburnholme was a civil parish in the Wapentake of Harthill. Baines stated that there was previously a small Benedictine nunnery, indicated by a mound, that was founded by the ancestors of Roger de Morley. Population at the time was 203, with occupations including ten farmers and yeomen, a shoemaker and shopkeeper, a schoolmaster, and a wheelwright.

Nunburnholme was served by Nunburnholme railway station on the York to Beverley Line between 1847 and 1951.

== See also ==
- Listed buildings in Nunburnholme

== Sources ==
- Gazetteer — A–Z of Towns Villages and Hamlets. East Riding of Yorkshire Council. 2006. p. 9.
