= Pocklington Canal =

Canal in the East Riding of Yorkshire, England

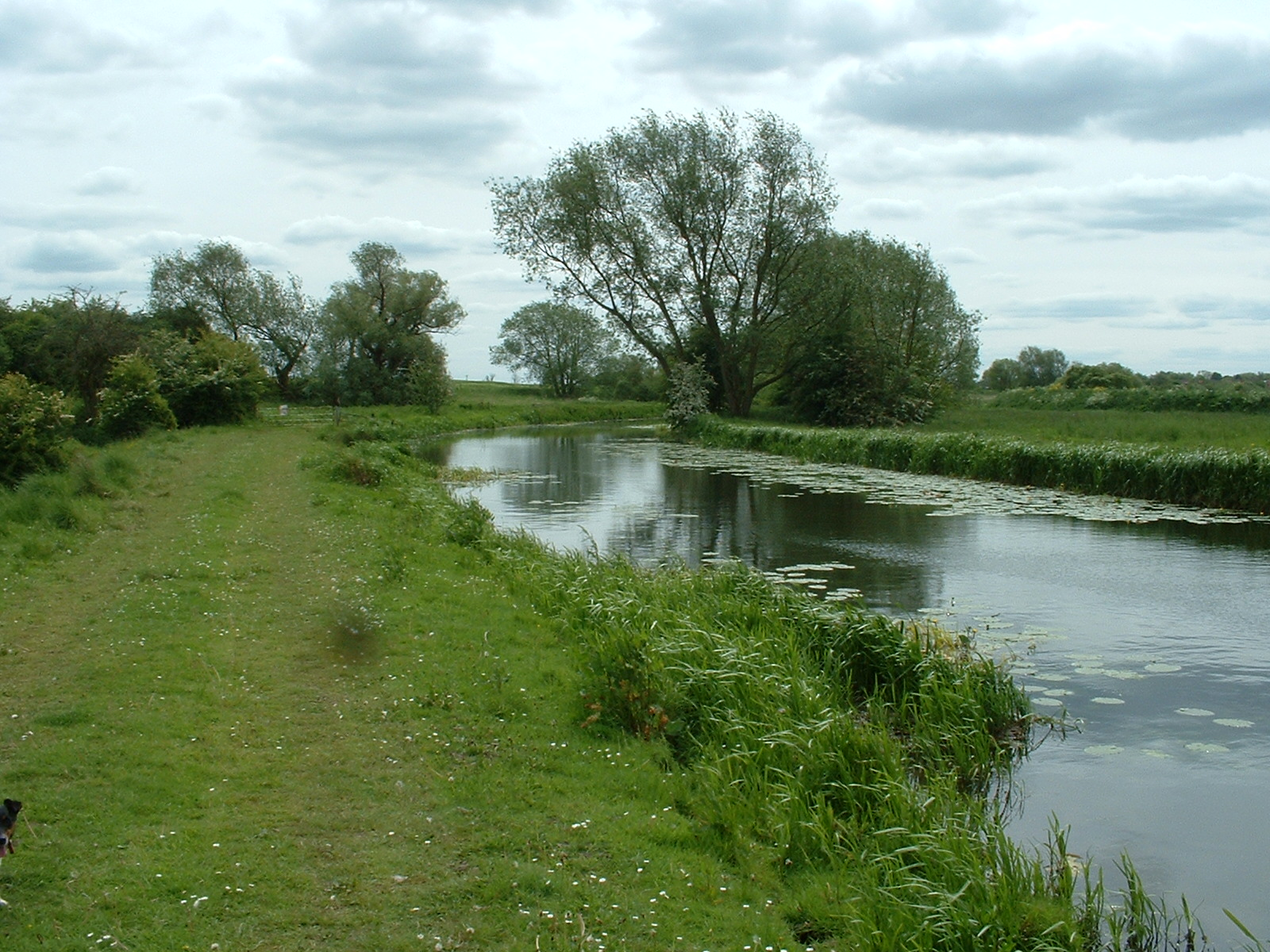
- The Pocklington Canal

Specifications
- Maximum boat length: 57 ft 0 in (17.37 m)
- Maximum boat beam: 14 ft 3 in (4.34 m)
- Locks: 9
- Status: Part Navigable
- Navigation authority: Canal and River Trust

History
- Original owner: Pocklington Canal Company
- Principal engineer: George Leather
- Date of act: 1815
- Date completed: 1818
- Date closed: 1934
- Date restored: 1971

Geography
- Start point: Pocklington
- End point: East Cottingwith
- Connects to: River Derwent

Map of the Pocklington Canal

The Pocklington Canal is a broad canal which runs for 9.5 miles (15.3 km) through nine locks from the Canal Head near Pocklington in the East Riding of Yorkshire, England, to the River Derwent which it joins near East Cottingwith. Most of it lies within a designated Site of Special Scientific Interest.

It ceased to function as a working canal in 1932, and was largely derelict when it was nationalised in 1948. Following a decision by the Bowes Committee in 1958 that it should not be retained for navigation, there were plans to fill it with sludge from a water treatment plant, although this did not occur. In 1969 the Pocklington Canal Amenity Society was formed, with the aim of restoring the canal. Gradually, locks were refurbished and sections reopened, with the most recent being the section to the Bielby Arm, which was completed in 2018. Two of the remaining five locks above this point have since been restored, but are not yet navigable.

== History ==
The first proposals to build a canal to Pocklington were made in 1765, when there were plans for a canal from the Humber Estuary to Wholesea, with two branches from there, one to Weighton and the other to Pocklington. Wholesea is near to the site of Sod House Lock on the Market Weighton Canal. A second assessment of the project was made two years later, and a third in 1771, but by December of that year, the plan was for the Market Weighton Canal as built, and the branch to Pocklington had been dropped completely. In 1777, a new plan for a canal from the River Derwent to Pocklington was considered, and approval was obtained from Lord Rockingham, but no further action was taken. Further debate occurred in 1801, when a public meeting was held at Pocklington. Some were in favour of a route to the River Ouse, but after due consideration, an engineer called Henry Eastburn was asked to make a survey of two possible routes to the Derwent. Eastburn had worked for John Rennie, but his whereabouts after 1801 are unknown, and when the report was presented, it had been produced by William Chapman. He suggested two routes, an 8-mile (13 km) route from East Cottingwith and a 9.5-mile (15.3 km) one from Bubwith. He then recommended that they choose a third route, 13.5 miles (21.7 km) long, which would join the Ouse near Howden. Knowing that this was unlikely to meet the approval either of Lord Rockingham or of Lord Fitzwilliam, who owned the Derwent, the plan was dropped.

Finally, in 1812, Earl Fitzwilliam employed George Leather Jr., to survey a proposed route. At the time, both Leather and his father were working for the Earl on a navigation and drainage scheme for the upper Derwent. The suggested route started at Sutton Lock on the Derwent, presumably so that goods for the Pocklington Canal would have to travel a greater distance along the Derwent, and therefore the tolls would be greater, but Leather found this route to be problematic, and proposed an alternative route to East Cottingwith. Before actually conducting the survey, he estimated the cost at £43,630, for a route with 8 locks that stopped at the turnpike road to Hull. He also suggested that the canal could be continued into Pocklington, with an extra two locks, for an additional cost of £8,257. He calculated the probable revenue at £1,245.50 per year, which was surprisingly close to the actual figure once the canal was built. He started surveying in 1813, but became ill, and the work was not completed until June 1814.

Pocklington Canal Act 1815
- Act of Parliament
- Parliament of the United Kingdom
- Long title: An Act for making and maintaining a navigable Canal from the River Derwent at East Cottingwith, in the East Riding of the County of York, to the Turnpike Road leading from the City of York to the Town of Kingston upon Hull, at a certain Place there called Street Bridge, in the Township of Pocklington, in the said Riding.
- Citation: 55 Geo. 3. c. lv

Dates
- Royal assent: 25 May 1815

Text of statute as originally enacted

There was some debate as to whether the extension from the road into Pocklington should be built, but it was decided to include provision for it in the bill to be put before Parliament, on the understanding that it would only be built if a majority of the shareholders approved. Leather estimated the cost for the section to the road, which included eight locks, at £32,032. The plan which accompanied the bill showed an extra five locks on the extension into Pocklington. The bill became an act of Parliament, the Pocklington Canal Act 1815 (55 Geo. 3. c. lv), on 25 May 1815, which authorised the newly formed Pocklington Canal Company to raise £32,000 by issuing shares, and an extra £10,000 is required, either by subscriptions from the shareholders or by mortgaging the works. A management committee was elected at a shareholders meeting held on 19 June, and all the money had been pledged by 7 July. Leather acted as engineer, and his first job was to write to Earl Fitzwilliam's agent, to enquire whether the Earl would be building a lock on the Derwent at East Cottingwith. As he was not, an entrance lock had to be built, which had not been included in the original estimate.

The canal was started from the Derwent end, so that sections could be brought into use as they were completed. Work progressed quickly, and some of the shareholders protested at the frequency with which calls were made for the money, but a fast build reduced overheads. The section to Hagg Bridge opened in August 1816, and the head of navigation was extended to Walbut in the following spring. Bad weather prevented Leather from completing the work by the end of 1817, and the canal eventually opened on 30 July 1818. The final cost was £32,695, the excess over the original estimate being caused by some additional works which had to be done. £2,495 was borrowed to cover the shortfall, and Leather received a warm vote of thanks from the shareholders.

=== Operation ===
The canal was sized to allow keels which operated on the Derwent to use it, and so the locks were 58 feet (18 m) long by 14 feet 3 inches (4.34 m) wide. The canal rose by around 101 feet (31 m) as it travelled the 9.5 miles (15.3 km) from the Derwent to Pocklington, and so the locks were quite deep, with a rise of a little over 11 feet (3.4 m) each. Pocklington Beck supplies most of the water for the canal through a feeder at Canal Head. The paddle gear on the locks was fitted with fixed handles when the canal opened, but these were replaced by removable ones after incidents where the lock pounds were emptied by unauthorised people. A house was built for the lock-keeper and collector of tolls, and Mark Swann was appointed to the post. The house was located close to the top lock.

Tolls raised just £623 in 1820, as there was competition for goods travelling to Hull, Market Weighton and York from road transport. However, in 1822 a packet boat was bought as a joint venture by several tradesmen, and a weekly service to Hull began. Traffic consisted of coal, lime, manure and general merchandise travelling up the canal to Pocklington, while corn, flour and timber travelled in the opposite direction. Traffic rose gradually, enabling the debts to be repaid during the 1820s, and in 1830, a dividend of 3 per cent was paid to shareholders. Many of the committee who had steered the project from the beginning took the opportunity to stand down at this point, to allow younger men to take the canal forwards. Average receipts from tolls were around £1,400 per year, which allowed the dividend to be around 3 per cent until the late 1840s.

In 1845, the projected York & Hull East & West Junction Railway made an offer to purchase the canal, and the chairman of the Pocklington company, who was associated with the York and North Midland Railway, made a counter offer for the same amount on behalf of his railway. The canal company accepted both offers, on the basis that the first railway to be authorised by an act of Parliament could then buy the canal. The York and North Midland obtained the York and North Midland Railway (East Riding Branches) (No. 2) Act 1846 (9 & 10 Vict. c. lxvi), and opened a line in October 1847 which linked Beverley, Market Weighton, Pocklington and York. They obtained another act, the York and North Midland Railway (Canals Purchase) Act 1847 (10 & 11 Vict. c. ccxvi), which authorised them to buy the canal, as well as the Market Weighton Canal, the Leven Canal and Vavasour's Canal. The total cost to the railway for the canal was £17,980, of which £4,587 was paid in cash and went to the smaller shareholders, while the rest was paid to the larger shareholders as debentures. The purchase was completed on 18 November 1848, and the railway had an obligation to keep the canal open. The Railway Commissioners could intervene if they failed to maintain the canal.

=== Decline ===
To minimise costs little more than token maintenance was carried out by the railway company. In May 1850, Swann, who had been collecting tolls since the canal opened, was dismissed. Some of the locks were repaired in 1851, after which the railway company received a suggestion from landowners that the canal should become a drainage ditch, with a tramway running along the bank for the carriage of goods. Although the idea was well received, no further action was taken. When the York and North Midland Railway was taken over by the North Eastern Railway in 1854, the new owners of the canal followed a similar policy of low maintenance. Traffic declined, from 5,721 tons in 1858 to 901 tons in 1892, by which time most boats terminated at Melbourne, and could only be partially loaded, as the channel was badly silted. Despite the difficulties, trade on the canal continued until 1932 and the canal remained passable for a further two years. When the railways were nationalised in 1948 the largely derelict (although not abandoned) canal became the responsibility of the British Transport Commission and from 1962 the British Waterways Board, which subsequently became British Waterways.

== Restoration ==
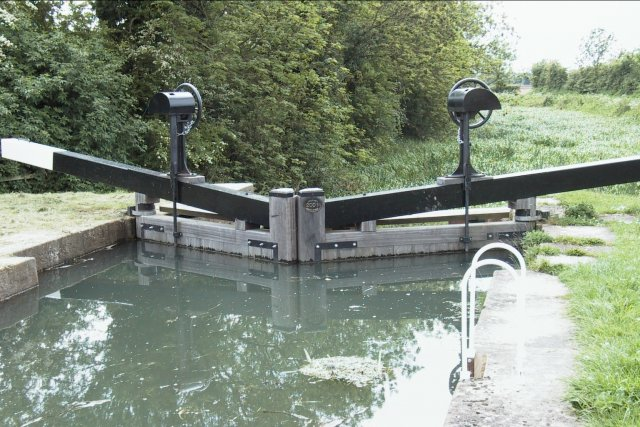
A lock on the Pocklington Canal.

In July 1958, the Bowes Committee published their Inquiry into Inland Waterways, which recommended that waterways should be classed as A, B or C, where class A and B would be retained for navigation, but class C would not. The Pocklington Canal was in class C, and the newly formed Inland Waterways Protection Society carried out a survey of it in 1959, so that they had evidence of its condition. A government White Paper followed the Bowes Report in February 1959, which recommended that an Inland Waterways Redevelopment Advisory Committee should assist schemes to regenerate canals which were no longer commercially viable. The evidence collected by the Protection Society was presented to the Redevelopment Advisory Committee in June 1959, when the Committee were examining a proposal to close the canal and fill it with sludge from a water treatment plant.

In the 1960s consideration was given to the possibility of restoring the canal, and in 1969 the Pocklington Canal Amenity Society was formed. Restoration began in 1971 with the repair of the entrance lock near East Cottingwith. In 1980, the Shell Oil Company funded a new set of gates for Thornton Lock, under an awards scheme. Further assistance was provided in 1986 when Pocklington Canal Amenity Society provided two swing bridges and East Yorkshire Borough Council funded the work to fit them. The canal as far as the Melbourne Arm was formally opened on 19 July 1987 by Brian Dice, Chief Executive of the British Waterways Board. Three sections of the canal, covering most of its route, have been designated as a Site of Special Scientific Interest, and consequently, all restoration and activity had to be by agreement between British Waterways and Natural England. Negotiations to restore Walbut lock took months to complete, but permission was finally granted in 1992. In 1995, the Pocklington Canal Amenity Society launched an appeal to fund new gates for Coates lock, and these were fitted in 2000. The section nearest to Pocklington benefited from a new set of bottom gates on the Top lock in 2002, and dredging of the pound above the lock by British Waterways. Further negotiation with English Nature resulted in permission to submit a bid to the Heritage Lottery Fund for completion of the restoration work.

In 2014, the Waterway Recovery Group held a camp at the canal, and restored much of the towpath between Giles and Sandhill locks. Around 1 mile (1.6 km) of the non-navigable section was dredged in 2017, as it was becoming choked with reeds. Some 8,000 tonnes of silt were removed by an amphibious dredger, and the nutrient-rich material was re-used on a local farm. The creation of areas of open water was expected to improve the bio-diversity of the canal corridor, for the benefit of rare aquatic plants and the 15 species of dragonfly and damsel for which the canal provides habitat. In late July 2018 the section of canal between the Melbourne Arm and the Bielby Arm was re-opened to navigation, exactly 200 years after the original opening of the canal. Restoration of the swing bridge below Walbut lock was funded by a donation from the Pocklington Canal Boat Club in 2014, and the refurbishment of Walbut and Thornton locks was aided by a grant of £500,000 from the Heritage Lottery Fund and £106,400 from the Inland Waterways Association. Dredging of the channel and cutting back the reeds was undertaken by the Canal and River Trust.

The canal society own a trip boat called New Horizons, which is based at Melbourne, and is used to enable the public to experience a cruise on the canal during the summer months. The canal is also noted for its wide variety of fish stocks, including tench, bream, perch and roach. It is popular with anglers, and the fishing rights are licensed to the York and District Amalgamation of Anglers. Restoration is ongoing and around 7 miles (11 km) of the canal had been restored by 2020. The section from the River Derwent to the Bielby Arm is navigable, and two of the remaining five locks have been renovated.

== Water quality ==
The Environment Agency measures the water quality of the waterways in England. Each is given an overall ecological status, which may be one of five levels: high, good, moderate, poor and bad. There are several components that are used to determine this, including biological status, which looks at the quantity and varieties of invertebrates, angiosperms and fish. Chemical status, which compares the concentrations of various chemicals against known safe concentrations, is rated good or fail.

The water quality of the Pocklington Canal was as follows in 2019.

| Section | Ecological Status | Chemical Status | Length | Catchment | Channel |
|---|---|---|---|---|---|
| Pocklington Canal | Good | Fail | 9.26 miles (14.90 km) | | artificial |

Like most waterways in the UK, the chemical status changed from good to fail in 2019, due to the presence of polybrominated diphenyl ethers (PBDE) and mercury compounds, neither of which had previously been included in the assessment.

== Coordinates ==
| Point | Coordinates (Links to map resources) | OS Grid Ref | Notes |
|---|---|---|---|
| Canal Head, Pocklington | 53.916°N 0.784°W | SE799473 | North terminus |
| Top Lock | 53.915°N 0.786°W | SE798471 | |
| Silburn Lock | 53.911°N 0.788°W | SE797468 | |
| Giles Lock | 53.907°N 0.791°W | SE795463 | |
| Sandhill Lock | 53.901°N 0.803°W | SE787457 | |
| Coates Lock | 53.897°N 0.806°W | SE785452 | |
| Bielby Arm | 53.887°N 0.806°W | SE785440 | Current north terminus |
| Walbut Lock | 53.888°N 0.828°W | SE771441 | |
| Thornton Lock | 53.890°N 0.844°W | SE761443 | |
| Melbourne Arm | 53.890°N 0.855°W | SE753444 | |
| Gardham Lock | 53.899°N 0.891°W | SE729453 | |
| Cottingwith Lock | 53.876°N 0.936°W | SE700427 | |
| River Derwent | 53.874°N 0.940°W | SE697425 | Southern terminus |

== See also ==
- Canals of the United Kingdom
- History of the British canal system

== Bibliography ==
- The Pocklington Canal – A Guide to the canal. The Pocklington Canal Amenity Society.
- Hadfield, Charles (1972). The Canals of Yorkshire and North East England (Vol 1). David and Charles. ISBN 978-0-7153-5719-4.
- Hadfield, Charles (1973). The Canals of Yorkshire and North East England (Vol 2). David and Charles. ISBN 978-0-7153-5975-4.
- Nicholson (2006). Nicholson Guides Vol 6: Nottingham, York and the North East. Harper Collins Publishing. ISBN 978-0-00-721114-2.
- Priestley, Joseph (1831). "Historical Account of the Navigable Rivers, Canals, and Railways of Great Britain". Archived from the original on 4 April 2016.
- Skempton, Sir Alec; et al. (2002). A Biographical Dictionary of Civil Engineers in Great Britain and Ireland: Vol 1: 1500 to 1830. Thomas Telford. ISBN 978-0-7277-2939-2.
- Squires, Roger (2008). Britain's restored canals. Landmark Publishing. ISBN 978-1-84306-331-5.
