= Chatto =

Chatto may refer to:

- Chatto (surname)
- Chatto & Windus, a UK book publisher based in London
- Pickering & Chatto Publishers, based in London
- Beth Chatto Gardens, in Essex, UK

== See also ==
- Chato (disambiguation)
- Catto (disambiguation)
- Chatton (disambiguation)
