= Catt =

Catt or CATT may refer to:

== People ==
- Alfred Catt (1833–1919), Australian parliamentarian
- Anthony Catt (1933–2018), English cricketer
- Carrie Chapman Catt (1859–1947), American women's suffrage leader
- Helena Catt, New Zealand public servant and academic
- Ian Catt (fl. 1990s), British record producer and musician
- Mike Catt (born 1971), English rugby player
- Nathan Catt (born 1988), English rugby union player
- Catt Sandler, American politician

== Acronyms ==
- Card agglutination test for trypanosomiasis or card-agglutination trypanosomiasis test, a serologic test used to detect human African trypanosomiasis
- Center for Advanced Transportation Technology, at the University of Maryland
- Centre d'Analyse Théorique et de Traitement, an economics research organisation at the University of Pau, France
- Children's Accelerated Trauma Technique, a treatment for PTSD in children
- China Academy of Telecommunications Technology, a Chinese institute
- Combined Arms Tactical Trainer, a British Army training installation
- New York State Center for Advanced Technology in Telecommunications, at Polytechnic Institute of New York University

== See also ==
- Catts
- Catto (disambiguation)
- Cat
- Kett
