= Chatton (disambiguation) =

Chatton is a village in Northumberland in England.

Chatton may also refer to:

- Chatton (surname)
- Chatton, Illinois, an unincorporated community in Houston Township, Adams County, Illinois, USA
- Chatton, New Zealand, a locality in the eastern Southland region of New Zealand
- Chatton transmitting station, a broadcasting and telecommunications facility in Northumberland, England

== See also ==
- Catton (disambiguation)
- Chatto (disambiguation)
