= Catto =

Catto may refer to:

== Places ==
- Cairn Catto, a prehistoric monument in Aberdeenshire, Scotland
- Catto, Switzerland, a village in the Swiss municipality of Quinto, Ticino

== People ==
- Catto (singer) (born 1987), Brazilian singer, instrumentalist, composer, illustrator, and designer
- Charles Catto (1934–2006), ice hockey director of player personnel and general manager
- Charles Gray Catto (1896–1972), American flying ace in World War I
- Edoardo Catto (1900–1963), Italian professional footballer
- Graeme Catto (born 1945), Scottish doctor, president of the General Medical Council
- Harry Catto (1865–1912), American Negro league baseball outfielder
- Henry E. Catto Jr. (1930–2011), American businessman and ambassador
- Jamie Catto (born 1968), British singer/songwriter
- Jeremy Catto (1939–2018), British historian
- Malcolm Catto, English drummer and record producer
- Max Catto (1907–1992), English playwright and novelist
- Octavius Catto (1839–1871), American civil rights advocate and black baseball organizer
- Sally Catto, general manager for programming at the Canadian Broadcasting Corporation
- Stephen Catto, 2nd Baron Catto (1923–2001), British businessman
- Thomas Catto, 1st Baron Catto (1879–1959), Scottish businessman and Governor of the Bank of England
- William D. Catto, United States Marine Corps general

== Other uses ==
- Catto Boi, a horror video game series and main character

== See also ==
- Cat
- Baron Catto
- Catt (disambiguation)
- Cato (disambiguation)
- Catton (disambiguation)
- Chatto (disambiguation)
