= Catton =

Catton may refer to:

== Places ==
=== England ===
- Catton, Derbyshire
  - Catton Hall, country house in Derbyshire, England
- Catton, East Riding of Yorkshire
- Catton Grove Chalk Pit, Site of Special Scientific Interest (SSSI) in Norfolk
- Catton, North Yorkshire
- Catton, Northumberland
- Catton, Norfolk and Norwich:
  - Old Catton, Norfolk
  - New Catton, Norwich; a UK location
- Catton Park, Old Catton, Norwich, public park in Old Catton
- High Catton, village in Yorkshire
- Low Catton, village in Yorkshire

=== United States ===
- Catton, the original estate on the site of Belair Mansion, Collington, Maryland

== People with the surname ==
- Bruce Catton, (1899–1978) an American writer & journalist
- Charles Catton the elder (1728–1798), English artist
- Charles Catton the younger (1756–1819), English artist
- Eleanor Catton (born 1985), New Zealand author
- Jack J. Catton (1920–1990), American air-force General
- Mary Catton (1882–1971), American Hawaiian social worker
- Rich Catton (born 1971), Canadian Lacrosse player
- William R. Catton, Jr. (1926–2015), American environmental sociologist and human ecologist
