= Chato =

Chato may refer to:

- an aircraft Polikarpov I-15
- Chato, Ghana, a village in upper Ghana
- Chato, Peru, a town in Peru
- Chato, Tanzania, a town in northwestern Tanzania
- Chato District, a district in northwestern Tanzania
- Chato Volcano, a mountain in Costa Rica
- Cerro Chato, a town in Uruguay
- Chato (cat), a fictional cat created by Gary Soto

== People ==
- Chato (Apache) (1854—1934), a Chiricahua warrior
- Chacato, a Native American people of Spanish Florida, later of French Louisiana
- Armando "Chato" Robles (b. 1978), a Mexican boxer
- José "Chato" Iraragorri (1912—1983), a Spanish footballer
- Liwayway Vinzons-Chato (b. 1945), a Filipino politician
- Osvaldo "Chato" Peredo (b. 1941), Bolivian physician and revolutionary
- Paul Chato (b. 1954), a Canadian comedian
- Raúl "Chato" Padilla (1917—1994), a Mexican actor
- Bill Tchato (1975), a Cameroonian footballer
- Siaka Bagayoko, a.k.a. "Chato" (b. July 4, 1998), Malian footballer who plays in the U-17 Malian national team
- Chato Santana, a fictional DC Comics character who shares the supervillain name El Diablo

== See also ==
- Chato Murciano, a breed of pig from Murcia, Spain
- Chatos Islands, islands off Antarctica
- Chato's Land, a western film
