= Chatto (surname) =

Chatto may refer to the following people:

- Chatto (Apache) (1860–1934), Chiricahua Apache chief
- Andrew Chatto (1840–1913), English book publisher
- Beth Chatto (1923–2018), plantswoman, garden designer and author
- Daniel Chatto (born 1957), British artist and former actor
- Dominic Chatto (born 1985), Nigerian footballer
- Edgar Chatto (born 1960), Filipino politician
- Grace Chatto (born 1985), British musician
- Keith Chatto (1924–1992), Australian comic book artist and writer
- Lady Sarah Chatto (born 1964), member of the British royal family
- Tom Chatto (1920–1982), English actor
- Virendranath Chattopadhyaya (1880–1937), Indian Bengali revolutionary
- William Andrew Chatto (1799–1864), English writer, sometimes used the pseudonym Stephen Oliver
