= Listed buildings in Catton, East Riding of Yorkshire =

Catton is a civil parish in the county of the East Riding of Yorkshire, England. It contains ten listed buildings that are recorded in the National Heritage List for England. Of these, one is listed at Grade I, the highest of the three grades, one is at Grade II*, the middle grade, and the others are at Grade II, the lowest grade. The parish contains the villages of High Catton and Low Catton, and the surrounding countryside. Most of the listed buildings are houses, and the others are a church, lamp posts in the churchyard, and a bridge.

== Key ==
Grade	Criteria
I	Buildings of exceptional interest, sometimes considered to be internationally important
II*	Particularly important buildings of more than special interest
II	Buildings of national importance and special interest

== Buildings ==
Name and location	Photograph	Date	Notes	Grade
All Saints' Church; 53.97715°N 0.92691°W		12th century	The church has been altered and extended though the centuries, including the rebuilding of the chancel in 1866 by G. E. Street. It consists of a nave, north and south aisles, a south porch, a north transept, a higher chancel with a north vestry, and a southwest tower. The tower has three stages, a plinth, diagonal buttresses, a slit window, two-light pointed bell openings with hood moulds, and an embattled parapet with corner finials.	I
Kexby Old Bridge; 53.95100°N 0.92681°W		1650	The bridge carried a road over the River Derwent. It is in stone and red brick, and consists of three round triple-chamfered arches. The bridge has pointed cutwaters with sloped tops between them, a band and a four-course parapet.	II*
Glebe Farmhouse; 53.97750°N 0.92625°W	—	17th century or earlier	The house, which has been extended, is in red brick, with quoins, a floor band, a dentilled brick eaves cornice, and a hipped slate roof. There are two storeys and three bays. The central doorway has a fanlight, it is under a segmental gauged brick arch, and the windows are sashes.	II
The Old Rectory; 53.97628°N 0.92576°W		17th century	The house has a 17th-century core, it was refronted in red brick in the 18th century, and extended in the late 19th century. It is colourwashed, partly rendered, with a modillion brick eaves cornice, and a pantile roof with raised gables. There are two storeys and three bays, and a later gabled wing on the left. The main block has a gabled porch, sash windows and two sloped roof dormers. The wing has oversailing eaves on shaped brackets, and contains sash windows under segmental brick arches.	II
Low Catton Grange; 53.94904°N 0.92071°W	—	Mid to late 18th century	The house is in orange brick, with a floor band, a dentilled brick eaves cornice, and a pantile roof with raised gables. There are two storeys and three bays. In the centre is a doorway with a fanlight under a cambered gauged brick arch, flanked by cross mullioned windows under similar arches. On the upper floor are casement windows.	II
White House; 53.97923°N 0.89802°W	—	Mid to late 18th century	The house is in rendered brick, and has a pantile roof with raised gables. There are two storeys and attics, and three bays. The doorway is in the centre, and the windows are sashes.	II
Barn Farmhouse; 53.95341°N 0.92227°W	—	Late 18th century	The house is in brown brick, and has a pantile roof, hipped on the left and with raised gables on the right. There are two storeys, and an L-shaped plan, with a front range of four bays and a rear wing. The doorway has pilasters, a fanlight with radial glazing, and a projecting cornice. The windows are sashes with wedge lintels.	II
The Beeches; 53.97548°N 0.92584°W	—	Late 18th century	The house is in grey brick, with dressings in gauged red brick, a dentilled brick eaves cornice, and a pantile roof with tumbled-in brickwork on the raised gables. There are two storeys and three bays. The central doorway has a fanlight with intersecting glazing bars, and the windows are sashes; all the openings have cambered gauged brick arches.	II
Town End Farmhouse; 53.96825°N 0.92526°W	—	Late 18th century	The house is in orange brick, with a stepped brick eaves cornice, and a pantile roof with raised gables. There are two storeys and three bays. The central doorway has a fanlight, the windows are sashes, and all the openings are under cambered gauged brick arches.	II
Four lamp posts, All Saints' Church; 53.97687°N 0.92641°W		1897	The lamp posts along the path in the churchyard are in cast iron. Each lamp post has a fluted column with the date on the capital, and on the crossbar is inscribed "JUBILEE 1897". On the top is a four-sided lamp, a ventilator and a wrought iron crown.	II
