= Listed buildings in Shiptonthorpe =

Shiptonthorpe is a civil parish in the county of the East Riding of Yorkshire, England. It contains seven listed buildings that are recorded in the National Heritage List for England. Of these, one is listed at Grade I, the highest of the three grades, and the others are at Grade II, the lowest grade. The parish contains the village of Shiptonthorpe and the surrounding area. All the listed buildings are in the village, and, apart from a church, all are houses.

== Key ==
Grade	Criteria
I	Buildings of exceptional interest, sometimes considered to be internationally important
II	Buildings of national importance and special interest

== Buildings ==
Name and location	Photograph	Date	Notes	Grade
All Saints' Church; 53.87767°N 0.70500°W		12th century	The church has been altered and extended through the centuries, including a restoration in 1883 by James Demaine. It is built in limestone with freestone dressings and a slate roof. The church consists of a nave, a north aisle, a south porch, a chancel with a north chapel, and a west tower. The tower has three stages, a moulded string course, a west lancet windows, blocked slit windows, two-light square-headed bell openings with a double chamfered surround, and an embattled parapet with eight crocketed pinnacles. The south porch is gabled, and has a round-headed arch with a reset statue above, and the door is Norman with three orders.	I
April Cottage; 53.87755°N 0.70439°W	—	Early 18th century	The cottage is in colourwashed rendered brick, with a dentilled brick eaves cornice, and a pantile roof with tumbled-in brick to the raised coped gables. There is a single storey and three bays. On the front is an open porch and casement windows.	II
Station Farmhouse; 53.88158°N 0.70453°W		Early to mid-18th century	The house is in colourwashed rendered brick, on a plinth, with a pantile roof. There are two storeys and three bays. On the front is a porch and a doorway, and the windows are sashes, those on the ground floor with wedge lintels.	II
Sprague Cottage; 53.88094°N 0.70485°W	—	Mid-18th century	The house is brown brick, with floor bands, a stepped brick eaves cornice, and a pantile roof with raised gables. There are two storeys and four bays. The doorway has a segmental head, and the windows are sashes.	II
The Kennels; 53.87908°N 0.70484°W		Late 18th century	The house is in brick, with a dentilled brick eaves cornice, and a pantile roof with tumbled-in brick to the raised gables. There are two storeys, two bays, and a rear outshut under a catslide roof. The central doorway, and the windows, which are sashes, have segmental heads.	II
The Lodge; 53.88054°N 0.70478°W		Late 18th century	The house is in orange brick, and has a pantile roof with tumbled-in brick to the raised gables. There are two storeys and three bays. The central doorway has pilasters and a dentilled cornice, and the windows are sashes under cambered arches.	II
The Stores; 53.88071°N 0.70498°W		Late 18th to early 198th century	The house is in red brick, with a dentilled brick eaves cornice, and a pantile roof with coped gables. Thee are two storeys and three bays. The central doorway has pilasters and a fanlight, and the windows are sashes.	II
