= Mason Jackson =

English wood engraver (1819–1903)

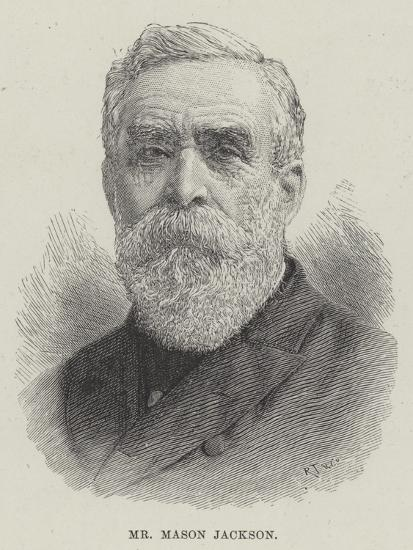
- Jackson in 1892
- Born: 25 May 1819; Ovingham, Northumberland, England
- Died: 28 December 1903 (aged 84)
- Resting place: Brompton Cemetery, London, England
- Occupation: Wood engraver

Mason Jackson (25 May 1819 – 28 December 1903) was an English wood engraver.

== Life ==
Jackson was born at Ovingham, Northumberland in 1819, and was trained as a wood engraver by his brother, John Jackson, the author of a history of this art.

In the middle of the 19th century, Jackson's prints for The Art Union gave him a considerable reputation, along with Charles Knight's Shakespeare and other standard books. On the death of Herbert Ingram in 1860, Jackson was appointed art editor of the Illustrated London News, a post he held for thirty years. He wrote a history of the rise and progress of illustrated journalism, entitled The Pictorial Press: Its Origins and Progress, published in 1885.

Jackson died in December 1903 and is buried in Brompton Cemetery, London.

Amongst his apprentices was Edmund Morison Wimperis, who became a notable watercolour landscape painter.
