= William Andrew Chatto =

English writer

William Andrew Chatto (1799–1864) was an English writer. He used the pseudonym Stephen Oliver (Junior).

== Life ==
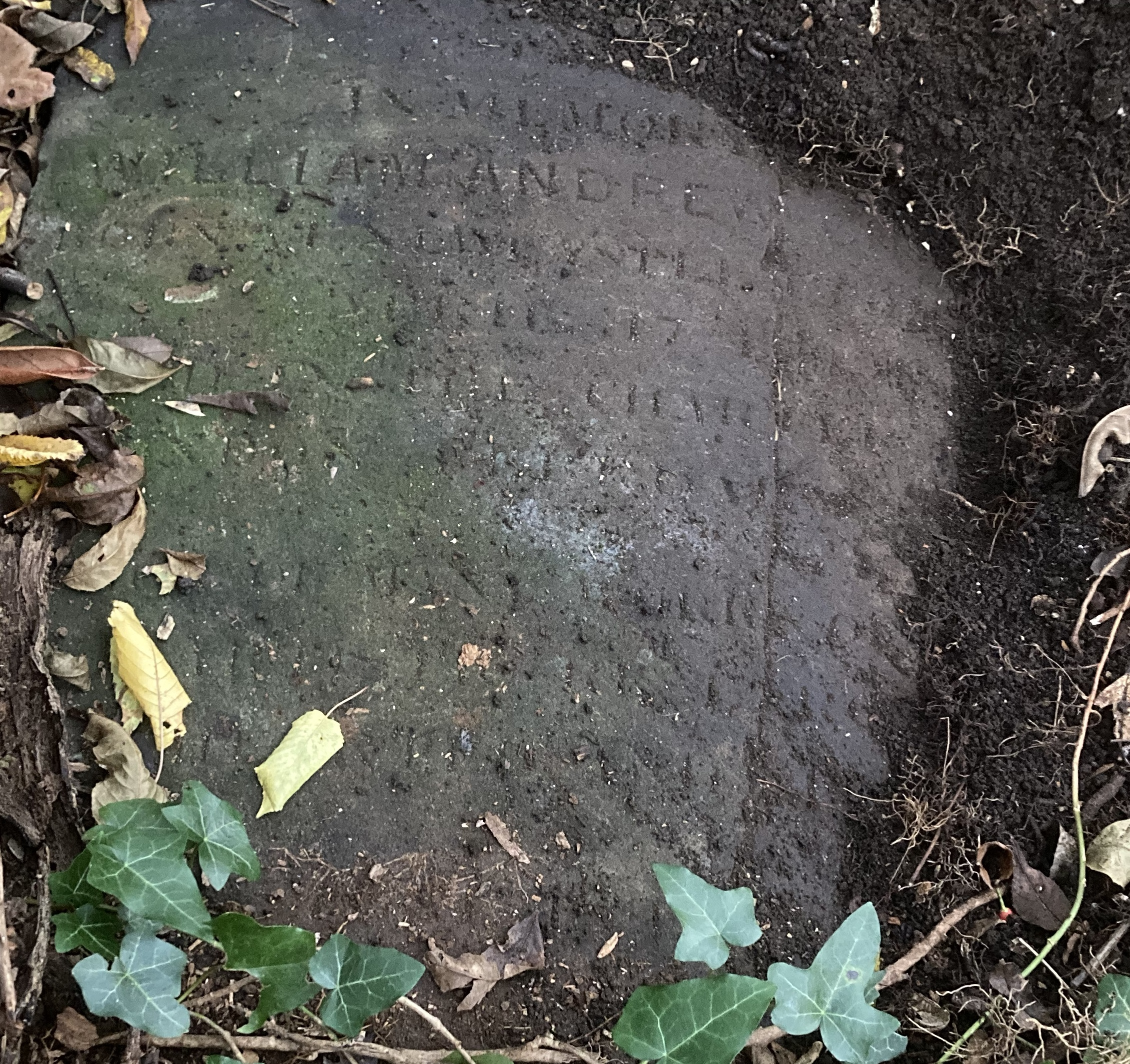
Grave of William Andrew Chatto in Highgate Cemetery (west side)

Born at Newcastle-on-Tyne on 17 April 1799, he was the only son of William Chatto, a merchant who died at Gibraltar in 1804. After education at a grammar school in the north, he went into business, and around 1830 acquired the firm of his cousin, a wholesale tea-dealer, in Eastcheap, London. In 1834 he gave up business to write. Also in this year, he acquired, probably from the Atkinson family, the Henry Atkinson manuscript, an important early source of violin music, dating from the 1690s, and written in or near Newcastle.

He was editor in 1839–41 of the New Sporting Magazine, and in 1844 projected a penny daily comic illustrated paper entitled Puck, a journalette of Fun (see also Penny press). For this paper, which he edited himself, he secured the services of contributors including Tom Taylor, but it had only a brief existence.

In 1839, Chatto was elected an honorary member of the Society of Antiquaries of Newcastle-on-Tyne.

He died in the London Charterhouse, 28 February 1864, and was buried on the western side of Highgate Cemetery (plot no.12990). His epitaph, by Taylor, his lifelong friend, described him as a "true-hearted and upright man".

=== Works ===
His works include two as Stephen Oliver:

- Rambles in Northumberland and on the Scottish Border: Interspersed with Brief Notices of Interesting Events in Border History (1835)

This book is now a reprint from Kessinger Publishings Legacy Reprint Series. It is referred to many times by Richard Oliver Heslop in his Northumberland Words; A glossary of words used in the County of Northumberland and on the Tyneside (2 vols), first published 1893-4.

- Scenes and Recollections of Fly-Fishing in Northumberland, Cumberland and Westmoreland.

Other books by Chatto, under his own name, include:

- A Treatise on Wood Engraving, Historical and Practical: With Upwards of Three Hundred Illustrations, Engraved on Wood (1839), with engraver John Jackson;
- Facts and Speculations on the Origin and History of Playing Cards (1848);
- The Angler's Souvenir (1835, 1845, 1847 under the pseudonym Paul Fisher); and
- A Paper;—of Tobacco. Treating of the Rise, Progress, Pleasures, and Advantages of Smoking. With Anecdotes of Distinguished Smokers, Mems. on Pipes and Tobacco-Boxes, and a Critical Essay on Snuff.

== Family ==
By his wife, Margaret, daughter of Luke Birch of Cornhill, London, he had five sons, of whom the third, Andrew Chatto (1840–1913), became a member of the publishing firm of Messrs. Chatto & Windus, and three daughters.
