= Shiptonthorpe =

Village and civil parish in the East Riding of Yorkshire, England

Coordinates: 53°52′48″N 0°42′19″W

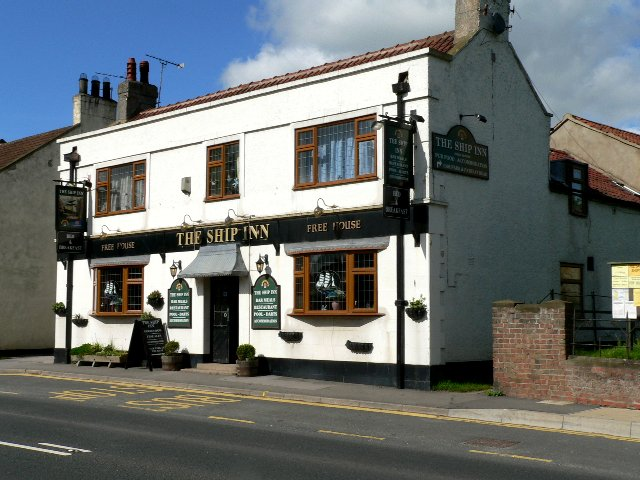
- The Ship Inn, Shiptonthorpe

- Location within the East Riding of Yorkshire
- Population: 503 (2011 census)
- OS grid reference: SE852433
- Civil parish: Shiptonthorpe
- Unitary authority: East Riding of Yorkshire
- Ceremonial county: East Riding of Yorkshire
- Region: Yorkshire and the Humber
- Country: England
- Sovereign state: United Kingdom
- Post town: YORK
- Postcode district: YO43
- Dialling code: 01430
- Police: Humberside
- Fire: Humberside
- Ambulance: Yorkshire
- UK Parliament: Bridlington and The Wolds

Shiptonthorpe (/ˈʃɪptənθɔːrp/) is a village and civil parish in the East Riding of Yorkshire, England. It is situated approximately 5 miles (8 km) southeast of the market town of Pocklington and 2 miles (3.2 km) northwest of the market town of Market Weighton.

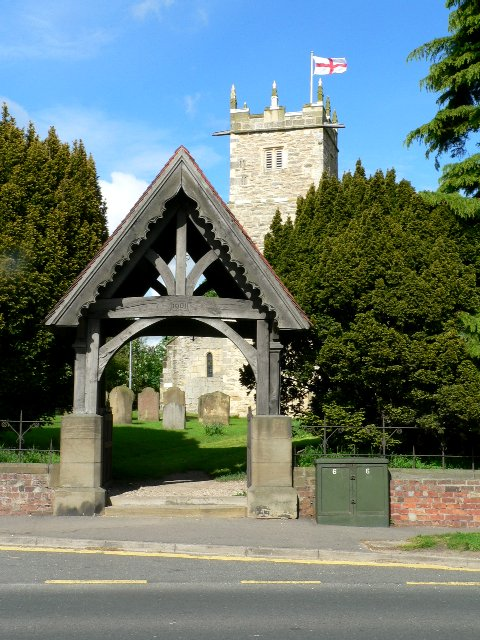
Lychgate of All Saints Parish Church, Shiptonthorpe

According to the 2011 UK census, Shiptonthorpe parish had a population of 503, an increase on the 2001 UK census figure of 419.

It has a petrol station, two churches, a shop, and a Renault main dealer. The Parish Church of All Saints is a Grade I listed building. On the outskirts, there is a garden centre called Langlands, and a McDonald's (previously a Little Chef) which opened in 2014. It formerly had two pubs.

The A1079 road runs through it. Plans for a bypass were put forward in the 1989 Roads for Prosperity white paper, but later dropped.

From 1847 to 1965, Shiptonthorpe was served by Londesborough railway station on the York to Beverley Line.

== See also ==
- Listed buildings in Shiptonthorpe
