= Ovingham =

Village in Northumberland, England

Coordinates: 54.966°N 1.865°W

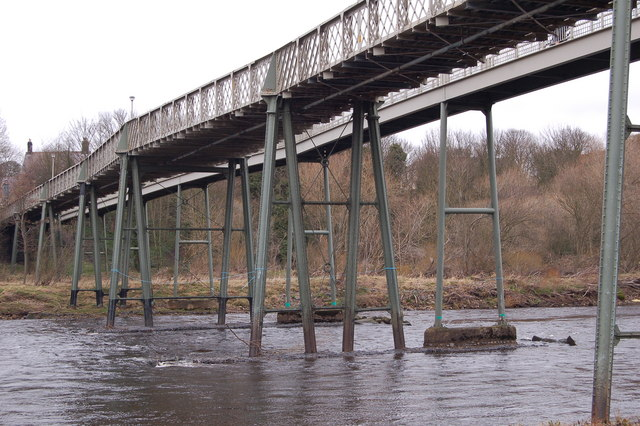
- Ovingham Bridge

- Location within Northumberland
- Population: 1,222 (2011)
- OS grid reference: NZ087634
- Unitary authority: Northumberland
- Ceremonial county: Northumberland
- Region: North East
- Country: England
- Sovereign state: United Kingdom
- Post town: PRUDHOE
- Postcode district: NE42
- Dialling code: 01661
- Police: Northumbria
- Fire: Northumberland
- Ambulance: North East
- UK Parliament: Hexham

Ovingham /ˈɒvɪŋdʒəm/ is a village and civil parish in the Tyne Valley of south Northumberland, England. It lies on the River Tyne 10 miles (16 km) east of Hexham with neighbours Prudhoe, Ovington, Wylam and Stocksfield.

The River Tyne provided an obstacle between Ovingham and Prudhoe until 20 December 1883, when a toll bridge (Ovingham Bridge) was finally opened, taking the place of the ferry. The steel tubes are marked Dorman Long Middlesbrough, the firm which designed and built the Sydney Harbour Bridge and the Tyne Bridge.

== Governance ==
Ovingham is in the parliamentary constituency of Hexham and forms part of the Bywell electoral ward for Northumberland County Council.

== Economy ==
There was a dyehouse at Ovingham, and in 1828 William Bullock was the foreman. Both Thomas Bewick from nearby Cherryburn and George Stephenson from nearby Wylam had relatives who were dyers. One of Bewick's woodcuts is entitled the Dyers of Ovingham, showing two men who are carrying a large tub on a pole. Mabel Stephenson, George's mother, was a daughter of an Ovingham dyer named Richard Carr. There were weavers in Ovingham, as well as a local tidewaiter, or customs inspector.

== Landmarks ==
The vicarage was, in medieval times, a cell for three Augustinian canons of Hexham, and was rebuilt in the seventeenth century. It was formerly the residence of the late Frank Atkinson, who did so much to establish the Beamish Museum in County Durham, and also the Bewick Trust at Cherryburn. Bewick received his education in the vicarage and the church.

The Ovingham 'pack-horse' bridge over the Whittle Burn consists of two segmental arches with a width of five feet between the parapets, so that it could not be used for wheeled traffic. It is likely that the Ovingham mill dam on the Tyne raised the level of the water. The bridge is Grade II listed and required repairs to the mortar after the severe flood of 2015. The adjacent ford was replaced by a concrete road bridge in the 1960s, although this is low lying and is overtopped by the Whittle Burn during times of flood.

Whittle dean is a deep woody dell which stretches southwards & joins the Tyne east of Ovington. The waters of this dean (peculiarly soft & clear) are the most celebrated in the north of England for whitening linen cloth. Mr. William Newton's bleach green, situated on this stream at the confluence of the Tyne is known and famed throughout all these northern parts. (Mackenzie 1825). The Whittle Burn can be traced back to the present day Whittledean Water Works on either side of the line of Hadrian's Wall near Welton Hall.

The first three trees of the Ovingham Community Orchard were planted in the old grazing field next to the allotments by children from Ovingham First School on Friday 23 November 2018. The following morning about 40 villagers turned out to plant the remaining 21 trees. Each tree will produce a different variety of apple.

== Transport ==
Railway

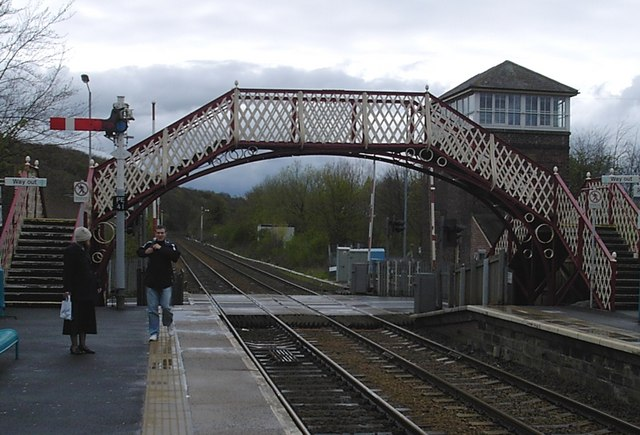
Prudhoe railway station

The village is served by Prudhoe railway station on the Tyne Valley Line. The line was opened in 1838, and links the city of Newcastle upon Tyne in Tyne and Wear with Carlisle in Cumbria. The line follows the course of the River Tyne through Northumberland.

Passenger services on the Tyne Valley Line are operated by Northern. The line is also heavily used for freight. The railway station is across the River Tyne on the south bank of the river technically not in Ovingham but in the neighbouring small town Prudhoe.

Bus

There are multiple bus stops in Ovingham.

Road

The village lies about 1 mile (1.6 km) south of the A69 road giving good links with Newcastle upon Tyne, Hexham, and Carlisle. The A695 road is accessible across Ovingham Bridge giving access to places on the south side of the River Tyne including Gateshead.

== Education ==
Ovingham has two schools, Ovingham Middle School and Ovingham CE First School. Ovingham Middle School educates 358 children, aged 9–13.

== Church ==
The Church of England parish church of Saint Mary has a tall slender Anglo-Saxon tower. There are fragments of an Anglo-Saxon cross in the church, which was much enlarged in the 13th century – wider, loftier and with long lancet windows. The nave with aisles is only two bays long, as the north and south transepts, each with a west aisle, take up the space of two more bays. There is a long chancel with very little ornament. The churchyard has a number of gravestones in memory of prominent villagers. In the porch is a stone slab commemorating Thomas Bewick who is buried in the churchyard, next to the tower.

== Markets and fairs ==
Ovingham had a charter for a market and two annual fairs on 26 October and 26 April. There was also a monthly tryst for cattle and sheep, which was discontinued in 1823. The ceremony for the Fair was similar to that for the Stagshaw Bank Fair at Corbridge nearby. A procession moved to the principal alehouse for the 'riding of the fair', led by the Duke of Northumberland's pipers, dressed in light blue and adorned with the Duke's sign of a crescent moon. The procession included the Duke's agent, bailiff, constable with many farmers and tenants. The fair was proclaimed and then they beat the bounds, returning to the tavern to drink the Duke's health from punch provided by him. The custom was discontinued in time, but revived in 1969 as the 'Goose Fair', since in the days of the old Fair geese would play an important part in the sale. Quill pens were made in Ovingham from goose feathers.

== Notable people ==
- Thomas Bewick was educated in the vicarage and the church, and is buried in the churchyard of St Mary
- Mason Jackson (1819–1903) was born in the village, as was his brother, John Jackson, both notable wood-engravers.
- Frank Atkinson (1924–2014), founding director of the Beamish Museum, lived in the village from 1982 until his death in 2014.
- Kevin Forster, Olympic Marathon Runner grew up in the village.
- The punk-rock band China Drum formed in Ovingham in 1989
- Rob Barker of Newcastle upon Tyne-based post-rock act Peace Burial at Sea grew up in the village.
