= Pickering & Chatto Publishers =

British academic publisher

- Founded: 1820
- Founder: William Pickering
- Country of origin: United Kingdom
- Headquarters location: London, United Kingdom
- Publication types: Academic monographs, critical editions, thematic source collections
- Nonfiction topics: Humanities and social sciences
- Official website: https://www.routledge.com/posts/5009

Pickering & Chatto is an imprint of Routledge which publishes in the humanities and social sciences, specializing in monographs, critical editions (works, diaries, correspondence) and thematic source collections. Pickering & Chatto's academic monographs have an international reputation and its critical editions and source collections are critically acclaimed. Pickering & Chatto is regarded as "the pre-eminent publisher of critical editions in the humanities and social sciences".

== History ==
The origins of the company can be traced back to William Pickering (1796–1854), who set up as an antiquarian bookseller and publisher in 1820. After his death, the business was carried on by his son, Basil Montagu Pickering. On his death, in 1878, it was purchased by Andrew Chatto (1840–1913), one of the founding partners of Chatto and Windus. By the early twentieth century Pickering & Chatto was solely concerned with antiquarian book selling.

Lord William Rees-Mogg bought Pickering & Chatto in 1981. In 1983 he re-established Pickering & Chatto (Publishers) Limited as an independent publishing house, serving as chairman and proprietor. In 1993 the antiquarian bookselling business became an entirely separate enterprise and there is now no connection between the two companies.

Pickering & Chatto (Publishers) Limited was based in Bloomsbury until March 2015, when it was acquired by the Taylor & Francis Group and became an imprint of Routledge.
