= All Saints' Church, Catton =

Church in the East Riding of Yorkshire, England

Coordinates: 53°58′38″N 0°55′37″W

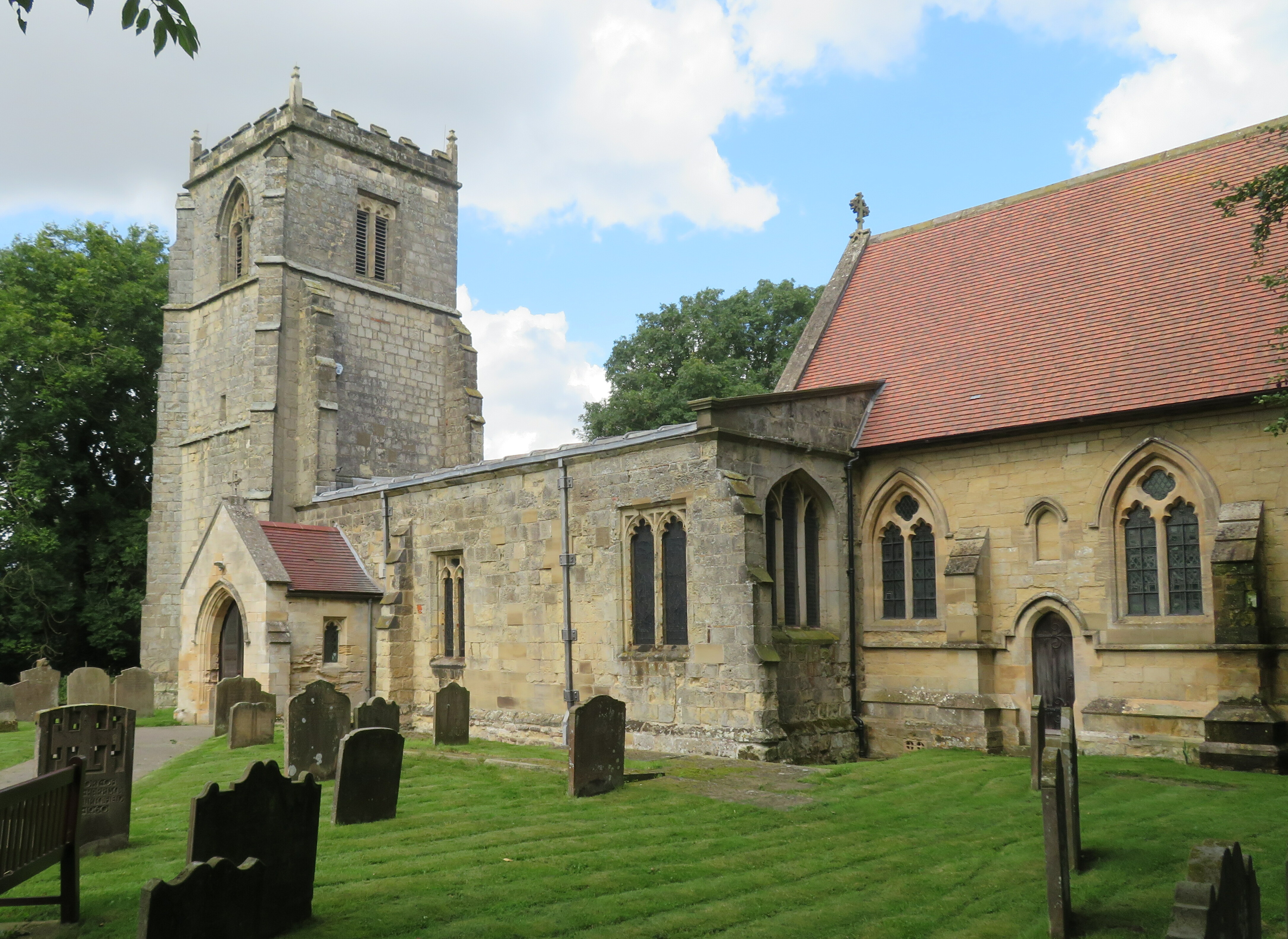
The church, in 2021

All Saints' Church is the parish church of Catton, East Riding of Yorkshire, a village in England.

The church was built in the 12th century, from which period the former transept survives. The north and south aisles were built in the 13th century. The tower largely dates from the 15th century, when the south aisle was extended and the north aisle rebuilt. In 1676, the church was described as "ruinous", but it was restored, and more extensively restored between 1859 and 1866 to a design by G. E. Street. A porch was also added in the 19th century. The building was grade I listed in 1967.

The church consists of a nave, north and south aisles, a south porch, a north transept, a higher chancel with a north vestry, and a southwest tower. The tower has three stages, a plinth, diagonal buttresses, a slit window, two-light pointed bell openings with hood moulds, and an embattled parapet with corner finials. Inside, there is a 13th-century font and the bowl of a 12th-century piscina. The east window has stained glass designed by William Morris.

== See also ==
- Grade I listed buildings in the East Riding of Yorkshire
- Listed buildings in Catton, East Riding of Yorkshire
