= A1078 road =

Road in Norfolk, England

Coordinates: 52.7704°N 0.4055°E

A1078

Route information
- Length: 2.5 mi (4.0 km)

Major junctions
- From: Austin Street, King's Lynn
- A148
- To: Junction with the A148; North King's Lynn

Location
- Country: United Kingdom
- Primary destinations: King's Lynn

Road network
- Roads in the United Kingdom; Motorways; A and B road zones
← A1077	→ A1079

The A1078 is an English A road entirely in the county of Norfolk. It runs from a junction with the A148 King's Lynn to Cromer Road in the town of King's Lynn to a junction with the A148 King's Lynn to Cromer in the northern suburbs of King's Lynn. The road is an essential part of the transport infrastructure of King's Lynn as it links King's Lynn Docks and its industrial estates to the A149 Queen Elizabeth Way (King's Lynn Southern Bypass), allowing HGV traffic to reach the A47 main trunk road without passing through the centre of King's Lynn.
