= Kexby, North Yorkshire =

Village and civil parish in North Yorkshire, England

Coordinates: 53.95015°N 0.93290°W

Kexby
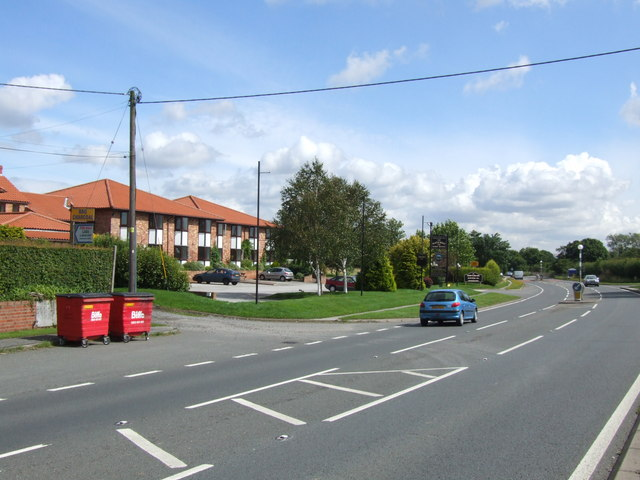
- A1079 runs through Kexby

- Location within North Yorkshire
- Population: 231 (2011 census)
- OS grid reference: SE701509
  - London: 170 mi (270 km) S
- Civil parish: Kexby
- Unitary authority: City of York
- Ceremonial county: North Yorkshire
- Region: Yorkshire and the Humber
- Country: England
- Sovereign state: United Kingdom
- Post town: YORK
- Postcode district: YO41
- Police: North Yorkshire
- Fire: North Yorkshire
- Ambulance: Yorkshire
- UK Parliament: York Outer

Kexby is a village and civil parish in the unitary authority of the City of York in North Yorkshire, England. It lies on the River Derwent and on the A1079 road about 5 miles (8 km) east of York not far from the East Riding of Yorkshire border.

The village was part of the East Riding of Yorkshire until 1974. It was part of the Selby District in North Yorkshire from 1974 until 1996. Since then it has been part of the City of York unitary authority.

According to the 2001 census the parish had a population of 194, it increased to 231 at the 2011 Census.

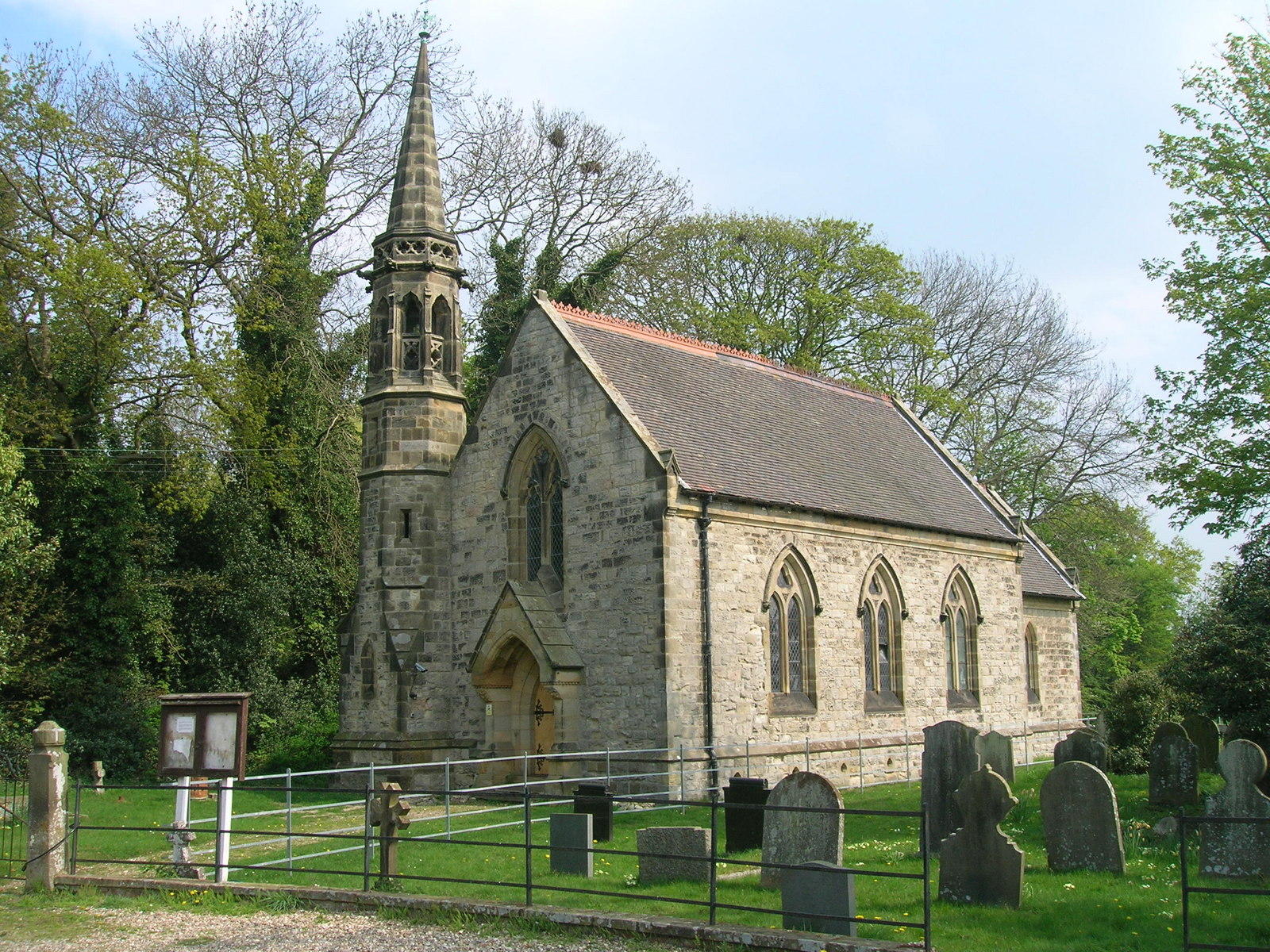
St Paul's Church

The name Kexby probably derives from the Old Norse Keksbȳ meaning 'Kek's village'. Alternatively, the first element may derive from the Middle English kex meaning a 'dried, hollow stem of a plant' or an 'Umbelliferae plant'.

In 1823 Kexby had a population of 149. Occupations included ten farmers and the landlord of the Coach and Horses public house.

The route of the White Rose Way, a long-distance walk from Leeds to Scarborough, North Yorkshire passes through.

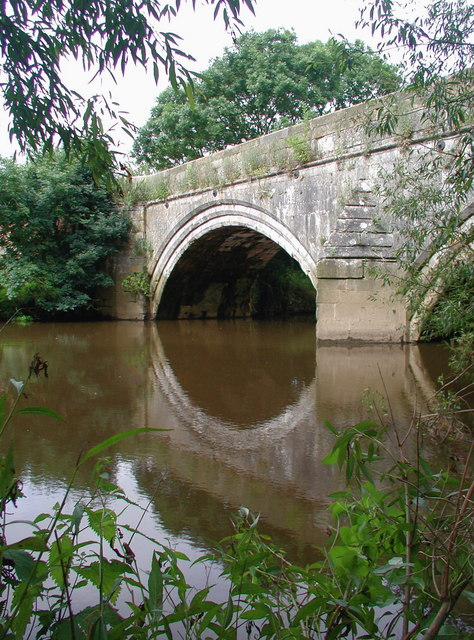
Kexby Bridge

Kexby Old Bridge over the River Derwent is a Scheduled Ancient Monument with a Grade II listing. Once a toll bridge, it was built in 1650 by Sir Roger Tresuer.

Former Emmerdale actor Frazer Hines has a stud farm here.
