= Frank Atkinson (museum director) =

British museum director and curator (1924–2014)

Frank Atkinson CBE
- Born: 13 April 1924; Barnsley, South Yorkshire
- Died: 30 December 2014 (aged 90)
- Occupations: Museum director and curator
- Known for: Founder of the Beamish Museum

Dr Frank Atkinson CBE (13 April 1924 – 30 December 2014) was a British museum director and curator. Atkinson is best known for creating the Beamish Museum near Stanley, County Durham, an open-air 'living' museum on the history of the north of England with a focus on the changes brought to both urban and rural life by the industrialisation of the early 20th century.

== Early life ==
Atkinson was born in Barnsley, West Riding of Yorkshire on 13 April 1924, the oldest son of Ernest, a labourer, and Elfrida, a school teacher and later headmistress. An early interest in fossil collecting later saw him become the youngest member of the Barnsley Naturalist and Scientific Society. He was educated at nearby Mapplewell School and at Barnsley grammar school. During the Second World War he obtained a science degree from the University of Sheffield, whilst also serving as a volunteer with the paratroops.

== Career ==
Atkinson began his working life at a coking plant. However, he spent his weekends and days off as a volunteer worker at Wakefield Museum where he successfully gained employment as a museum assistant. At the age of 25 he became the institution's director; he was the youngest museum director in the country. In 1952, Atkinson became Director of Halifax Museums and Art Gallery with responsibility for Shibden Hall, Bankfield Museum and Belle Vue. In 1958, he was appointed curator of the Bowes Museum, an art museum in Barnard Castle, Teesdale. Here, he first began to realise his vision of creating an English version of the open-air museums he had seen on a trip to Scandinavia in 1952.

In 1966, Atkinson was instrumental in the setting-up of the working party that resulted in the creation of Beamish with him as its first director. The aim was to create an "Open-Air Museum for the purpose of studying, collecting, preserving and exhibiting buildings, machinery, objects and information illustrating the development of industry and the way of life of the North of England". He said of the creation of Beamish Museum: "It is essential that collecting be carried out quickly and on as big a scale as possible. It is now almost too late." To this end, Atkinson initiated a policy of "unselective collecting", saying: "you offer it to us and we will collect it". This method of building up the collection proved highly successful and in addition forged links between the institution and the surrounding community. Beamish was also innovative in its operational arrangements, receiving funding and administrative assistance from a consortium of four neighbouring county councils – Northumberland, Tyne and Wear, Cleveland, and Durham; it was the UK's first museum to be run in this way.

Under Atkinson's direction, Beamish was named the National Heritage 'Museum of the Year' in 1986, and the following year was awarded the title 'European Museum of the Year'. Atkinson attended the latter award ceremony despite having recently had cancer surgery. He retired the same year, although his association with Beamish continued; he served as President of the Friends of Beamish until his death. Following his retirement, Atkinson was Commissioner with the Museums and Galleries Commission (MGC) and Chairman of the Commission's Registration Committee, until December 1994. He had previously worked as an advisor for a number of national bodies in the museums and galleries sector. He also acted as an advisor to the Thomas Bewick Birthplace Trust, overseeing the handover of its archives to the National Trust in 1991.

== Awards and honours ==
In 1980, Atkinson was awarded the OBE. Durham University conferred Atkinson an honorary doctorate of civil law (DCL) upon his retirement in 1987. He was later awarded the CBE in the 1995 New Year Honours list, for services to the development of museums.

== Private life ==
Atkinson met his wife-to-be, Joan Peirson, when she joined the museum service in Halifax. They married on Valentine's Day 1953, celebrating their 60th wedding anniversary in 2013. They had three sons and from 1982 they lived in Ovingham, Northumberland, where Atkinson assisted in fundraising for repairs to the church tower and later became Vice-Chairman of the Parochial church council. Atkinson's hobbies included potholing, an interest he had discovered at the age of 12, as well as photography and collecting Natural History specimens such as beetles, ferns, fossils and minerals.

== Death and legacy ==
Atkinson died on 30 December 2014, after a long illness. Richard Evans, the director of Beamish, told the BBC:

"The word 'visionary' is often overused perhaps, but in Frank's case it really is true. He was a one off, a truly remarkable man, with boundless energy combined with a striking intellect and an infectious curiosity for history. He collected thousands of objects over the years, always interested in typical and everyday items that help tell the story of everyday life – stories that are so often overlooked and forgotten. His life's work was to preserve and study the history of everyday life in the North East and to present this story in a vivid, immersive and accessible way".

Durham county councillor Carl Marshall, chairman of the board at Beamish, said:

“Frank’s death is really, really sad news for everybody associated with the museum and culture across the North-East. The work he did and the vision he had for the museum in selecting the site and bringing all of the local authorities together in those days was virtually unheard of. His vision for the museum was for it to be immersed in the culture of the region and that is what we have got. It is magnificent and that is his lasting legacy”.

== Publications ==
As well as an autobiography, The Man Who Made Beamish, Atkinson also wrote several books on the history and traditional pastimes of the North East – amongst them leek growing and pigeon fancying.

=== Books ===
- Atkinson, Frank (1977). Life and Tradition in Northumberland and Durham. London: J. M. Dent. ISBN 978-0460042437. LCCN 77366022.
- Atkinson, Frank (1989). Victorian Britain: The North East. Newton Abbot, England: David & Charles. ISBN 978-0715387474. LCCN 90127990.
- Guy, Andy; Atkinson, Frank (1992). West Durham: The Archaeology of Industry. Phillimore. ISBN 978-1860774478.
- Atkinson, Frank (1991). Northern Life. Pictures from the Past. London: Collins & Brown. ISBN 978-1855850675.
- Atkinson, Frank (1999). The Man Who Made Beamish. Northern Books. ISBN 978-0953573004.
- Atkinson, Frank (2001) The Story of Ovingham on Tyne. A village History. Northern Books ISBN 978-0-9535730-1-1.

=== Articles ===
Atkinson also wrote a number of articles in journals and magazines.

- Atkinson, F (1947). "Notes on Collecting Cave Fauna". Journal and Proceedings of the British Speleological Association. 1 (2): 63–64.
- Atkinson, F (1948). "The Peak Cavern Survey: Fauna". Journal and Proceedings of the British Speleological Association. 1 (4): 126–129.
- Atkinson, F (1948). "Giants Hole, Castleton, Derbyshire". Journal and Proceedings of the British Speleological Association. 1 (5): 132–140.
- Simpson, E; Atkinson, F (1948). "Lancaster Hole, Casterton Fell, Westmorland". Journal and Proceedings of the British Speleological Association. 1 (6): 202–217.
- Atkinson, F (1949). "Lancaster Hole-The Cow Pot Entrance". Journal and Proceedings of the British Speleological Association. 1 (7): 279.
- Atkinson, F (1949). "Colour and movement in museum display". Museums Journal. 49 (6): 135–141.
- Atkinson, F (1949). "Eldon Hole – Present [Derbyshire]". Journal and Proceedings of the British Speleological Association. 1 (8): 322–323.
- Atkinson, F (1949). "The Cavern, Ireby Fell, Lancashire". Journal and Proceedings of the British Speleological Association. 2 (9): 21–27.
- Atkinson, F; Speak, H (1950). "Saturday museum". Museums Journal. 50 (6): 129–130.
- Atkinson, F (1950). "New Pots for Old – Bar Pot, Yorkshire". Journal and Proceedings of the British Speleological Association. 2 (11): 136–138.
- Atkinson, F (1950). "Oxford Hole, Casterton Fell, Westmorland". Journal and Proceedings of the British Speleological Association. 2 (14): 231–237, 245, 230. Plan in conjunction with RD Leakey.
- Atkinson, F (1957). "A Manx fireplace (Chiollagh)". Gwerin. 1 (4): 182–184.
- Atkinson, F (1958). "Nail making". The Woodworker. February 1958.
- Atkinson, F (1958). "Yorkshire nailmaking". In: The Second Northcountryman, ed Stanley Williamson. G and AN Scott Ltd, Rochdale.
- Atkinson, F (1959). "Water-shot stonework: a building technique". Transactions of the Lancashire and Cheshire Antiquarian Society. LXIX: 140–143. ISSN 0950-4699.
- Atkinson, F (1960). "The Horse as a Source of Rotary Power". Transactions of the Newcomen Society. 33 (1): 31–55. doi:10.1179/tns.1960.003. ISSN 0372-0187.http://pubs-newcomen.com/tfiles/33p031.pdf%5B%5D
- Atkinson, F (1960). "Dives House Barn at Dalton, near Huddersfield". Yorkshire Archaeological Journal. XL (1): 192–196.
- Atkinson, F (1961). "Oatbread maker of the Pennines". Country Life. 16 March 1961.
- Atkinson, F (1962). "A museum with a difference". The Village. 17 (1): 12–14.
- Atkinson, F (1962). "Yorkshire's last oatbread maker?". Country Life. February 1962.
- Atkinson, F (1962). "Pennine Haymaking". Country Life. Spring 1962.
- Atkinson, F (1963). "Some notes on the formation of caverns in the Craven area of south-west Yorkshire". Proceedings of the British Speleological Association. 1: 67–78.
- Atkinson, F (1963). "Knur and spell' and allied games". Folk Life. 1: 43–65. doi:10.1179/043087763798255114.
- Atkinson, F (1963). "The administration of museums by librarian-curators". Museums Journal. 63 (3): 147–155.
- Atkinson, F (1964). "An open-air museum of the north-east". The Journal of Industrial Archaeology. 1 (1): 3–8.
- Atkinson, F; Ward, A (1964). "A pair of "clog" wheels from northern England (of the early 19th century)". Transactions of the Yorkshire Dialect Society. 11 (64): 33–40.
- Atkinson, F (1965). "Yorkshire miners' cottages". Folk Life. 3 (1): 92–96. doi:10.1179/flk.1965.3.1.92.
- Atkinson, F; McDowall, RW (1967). "Aisled houses in the Halifax area". The Antiquaries Journal. 47 (1): 77–94. doi:10.1017/S0003581500013470.
