= Kexby Old Bridge =

Listed bridge in Yorkshire, England

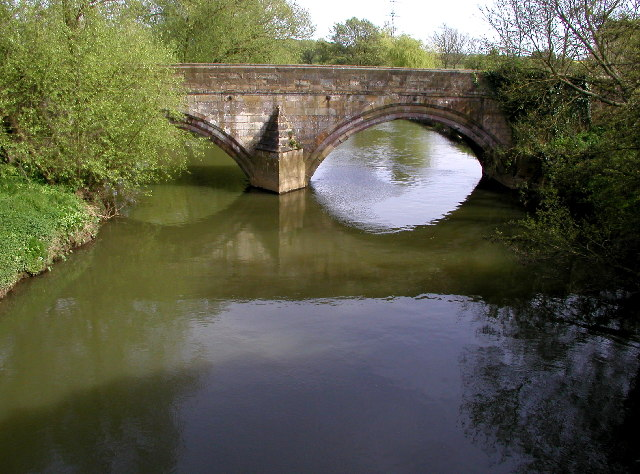

- Location in the East Riding of Yorkshire
- 53.951°N 0.9268°W
- Location: Kexby, City of York, England

Listed Building – Grade II*
- Official name: Kexby Old Bridge
- Designated: 17 November 1966
- Reference no.: 1316288

Scheduled monument
- Official name: Kexby Bridge
- Reference no.: 1004901

Kexby Old Bridge is a historic bridge in Yorkshire, in England.

The bridge crosses the River Derwent, linking Kexby in the City of York with Catton in the East Riding of Yorkshire. It lies on the main route from York to Kingston upon Hull, and a ferry at the location was first recorded in 1315. In the 1420s, a three-arch bridge was constructed by Nicholas Blackburn, although the ferry continued to operate.

Because of the importance of the road, Roger Tresuer rebuilt the bridge from 1648 to 1650, and an inscription on it states that it was built in 1650. Despite this, the Victoria County History claims that part of the earlier bridge may be incorporated in the present structure, including a coat of arms of the Ughtred family.

In 1764, the road was made a turnpike, and much work was done to the bridge over the remainder of the century, with an inscription noting repairs in 1778. In the 20th century, the road was widened and straightened, but in 1960, a new concrete bridge was built as a bypass, forming part of the A1079 road.

The bridge was damaged in the Boxing Day floods of 2015, and in 2017 major defects were found in it. It was then closed to motorised traffic. A steel arch frame was added to stabilise the western arch, and in 2020 and 2021, the central pier was partly rebuilt, and other work conducted to restore the bridge. However, it was decided that it would not reopen to motor vehicles.

The bridge is constructed of stone and brick, and has three arches, with the piers each having a pointed cutwater. The ground under the eastern arch is usually dry. Its parapet has four courses of stone. It is a Grade II* listed building and a scheduled monument.

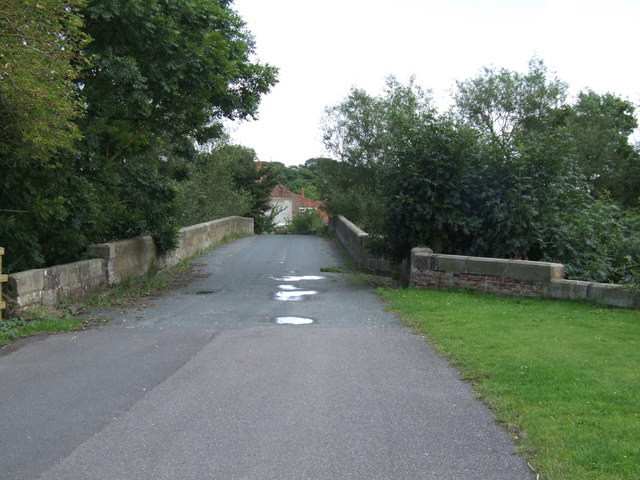
Roadway over the bridge in 2008

== See also ==
- Grade II* listed buildings in the City of York
