= John Jackson (engraver) =

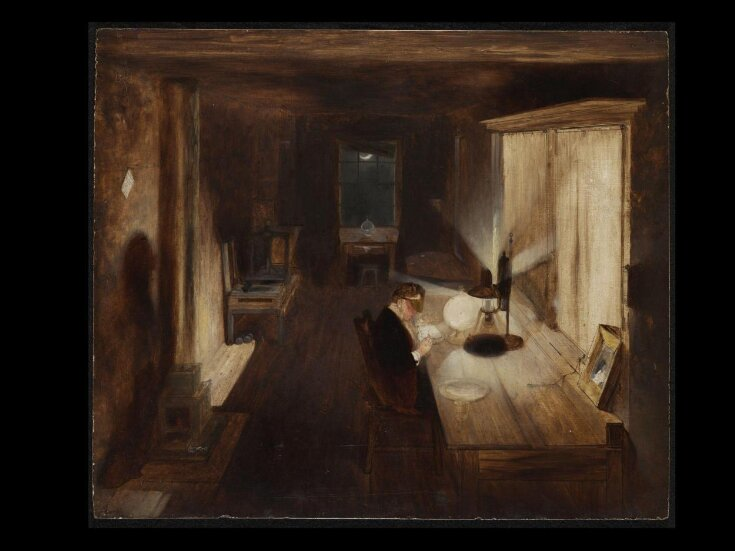
John Jackson the Wood-Engraver at work, by Robert William Buss

John Jackson (1801–1848) was a British wood-engraver.

Jackson was born at Ovingham, Northumberland in 1801, and was apprenticed to the wood-engraver Thomas Bewick. After a quarrel with his master, Jackson went to London and worked for the wood-engraver William Harvey.

Jackson made wood-engravings for Northcote's Fables and illustrations for the Penny Magazine. In the early 1830s he taught wood-engraving to his younger brother Mason Jackson. In 1839 he provided over 300 prints for an illustrated history of wood-engraving with text written by William Andrew Chatto.

He died in 1848 and was buried on the western side of Highgate Cemetery. The grave (no.2680) no longer has a headstone or marker.
