= Low Catton =

Village in the East Riding of Yorkshire, England

Coordinates: 53.975195°N 0.926389°W

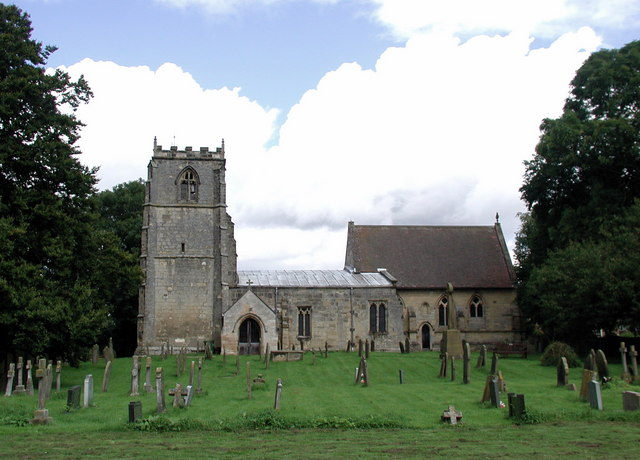
- All Saints Church, Low Catton

- Location within the East Riding of Yorkshire
- OS grid reference: SE705537
  - London: 170 mi (270 km) S
- Civil parish: Catton
- Unitary authority: East Riding of Yorkshire
- Ceremonial county: East Riding of Yorkshire
- Region: Yorkshire and the Humber
- Country: England
- Sovereign state: United Kingdom
- Post town: YORK
- Postcode district: YO41
- Dialling code: 01759
- Police: Humberside
- Fire: Humberside
- Ambulance: Yorkshire
- UK Parliament: Goole and Pocklington

Low Catton is a village and former civil parish, now in the parish of Catton, in the East Riding of Yorkshire, England. It is situated approximately 7 miles (11 km) north-west of the market town of Pocklington and about 1 mile (1.6 km) south of the village of Stamford Bridge. In 1931 the parish had a population of 85. Low Catton became a civil parish in 1866, on 1 April 1935 the parish was abolished and merged with High Catton to form "Catton".

Low Catton lies on the east bank of the River Derwent.

The name Catton probably derives from either the Old English personal name Catta or the Old Norse personal name Kati, and the Old English tūn meaning 'settlement'. It has also been suggested that the first element is derived from the Old English catt meaning 'cat'.

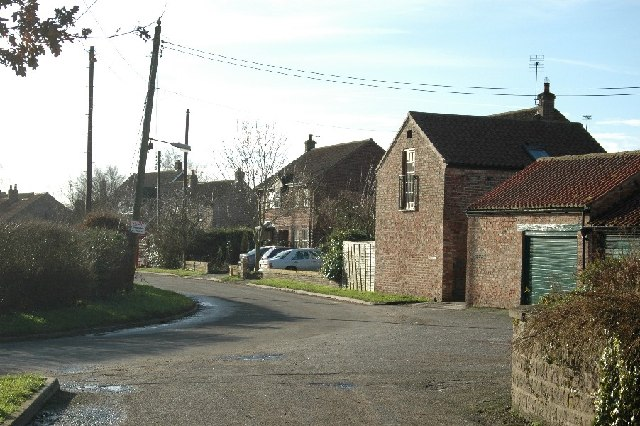
Main street

All Saints' Church, Catton was designated a Grade I listed building in 1967 and is now recorded in the National Heritage List for England, maintained by Historic England.

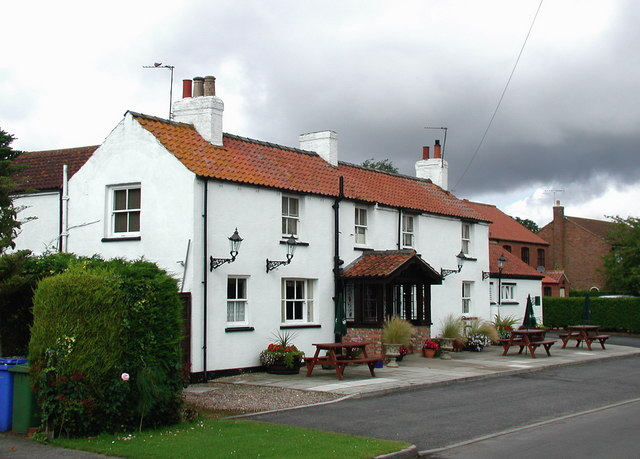
The Gold Cup Inn

In 1823, Low Catton church was under the patronage of the Earl of Egremont. In the village existed a grammar school with schoolmaster. The population at the time was 177. Occupations included nine farmers, a joiner, a shoemaker, and a curate. There was a yeoman, and the steward to Lord Egremont at Catton Lodge.

== See also ==
- Listed buildings in Catton, East Riding of Yorkshire
