= King's Lynn Docks =

Port in Norfolk, England

King's Lynn Docks Port of King's Lynn
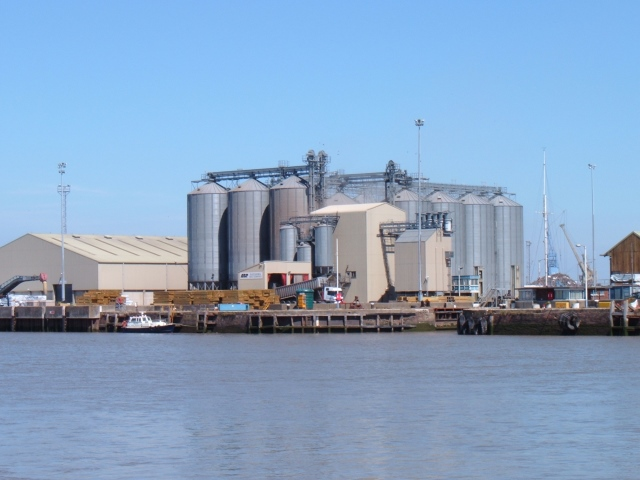
- Pilot Boat at the entrance to King's Lynn Dock
- Interactive map of King's Lynn Docks; Port of King's Lynn
- King's Lynn Docks within Norfolk

Location
- Country: England
- Location: King's Lynn, King's Lynn and West Norfolk, Norfolk
- Coordinates: 52.7608°N 0.3918°E

Details
- Operated by: Port of King's Lynn
- Owned by: ABP (Jersey) Ltd

King's Lynn Docks are located to the north of the town of King's Lynn in the English county of Norfolk. They are on the River Great Ouse which provides access to the North Sea via the Lynn Channel and The Wash. They are located 39 miles (63 km) north of Cambridge, 40 miles (64 km) west of Norwich and 92 miles (148 km) north of London on the A1078 Edward Benefer Way.

The docks are operated as the Port of King's Lynn by Associated British Ports. It handles around 400,000 tonnes of cargo per year, including forest products, agribulk and manufacturing and recycling materials. Three docks, including the tidal Riverside Quay, can accommodate vessels up to 140 metres (460 ft) in length. The docks cover an area of 39 hectares (96 acres) and include the 25,000 tonne capacity Alexandra Grain Silo complex.

== History ==
In the 13th century King's Lynn was one of England's most important ports. It attracted traders from the Hanseatic League trading for wool, cloth and salt.

King's Lynn Docks and Railway Act 1865
- Act of Parliament
- Parliament of the United Kingdom
- Long title: An Act to authorize the Construction of Docks at King's Lynn, and for other Purposes relating to that Undertaking.
- Citation: 28 & 29 Vict. c. lxxxviii

Dates
- Royal assent: 19 June 1865

Text of statute as originally enacted

The port infrastructure developed in the 19th century following the formation of the King's Lynn Docks and Railway Company by the King's Lynn Docks and Railway Act 1865 (28 & 29 Vict. c. lxxxviii). This built the Alexandra Dock which was completed in 1869 and linked by rail in 1870. By 1876 over 500 ships were using the new dock each year. The larger Bentinck Dock with a length of 800 metres (2,600 ft) was opened in 1883. The port has traditionally relied on exporting agricultural produce for the bulk of its traffic.

== Transport links ==
The docks are on the A1078 road and linked via this and the A148 road through King's Lynn to the main A47 trunk road to the south of the town. This provides links to the A17 and A1 roads to the west. Other main roads connect the port to the M11 motorway and A14 trunk road at Cambridge, providing links to the UK motorway network.

The nearest railway station is King's Lynn railway station on the Fen Line which runs between King's Lynn, Ely and Cambridge and provides links to London King's Cross and London Liverpool Street stations. The port had a railway link to this line in the 19th century, the last elements of which were closed in the 1990s.

== Seafarers' welfare ==
The port now has a dedicated centre, set up by the Apostleship of the Sea, for visiting seafarers. The facility offers them a place to relax, and spend some quiet time, with free internet connection for them to use. It was opened on 17 November 2014 by Bishop Alan Hopes, Bishop of East Anglia. The centre is largely-funded by the Merchant Navy Welfare Board and the site on which it was built was provided by Associated British Ports.
