= Harry Catto =

American baseball player

- Outfielder
- Born: February 2, 1865; Bordentown, New Jersey, U.S.
- Died: February 5, 1912 (aged 47); St. Augustine, Florida, U.S.

Negro league baseball debut
- 1887, for the Cuban Giants

Last appearance
- 1891, for the Cuban Giants

Teams
- Cuban Giants (1887–1888, 1891)

Harry Catto (February 2, 1865 – February 5, 1912) was an American Negro league outfielder in the 1880s and 1890s.

A native of Bordentown, New Jersey, Catto played for the Cuban Giants in 1887, 1888, and 1891. He died in St. Augustine, Florida in 1912 at age 47.
