= Catton Grove Chalk Pit =

Geological Site of Special Scientific Interest near Norwich, UK

Coordinates: 52.649°N 1.292°E

- Site of Special Scientific Interest
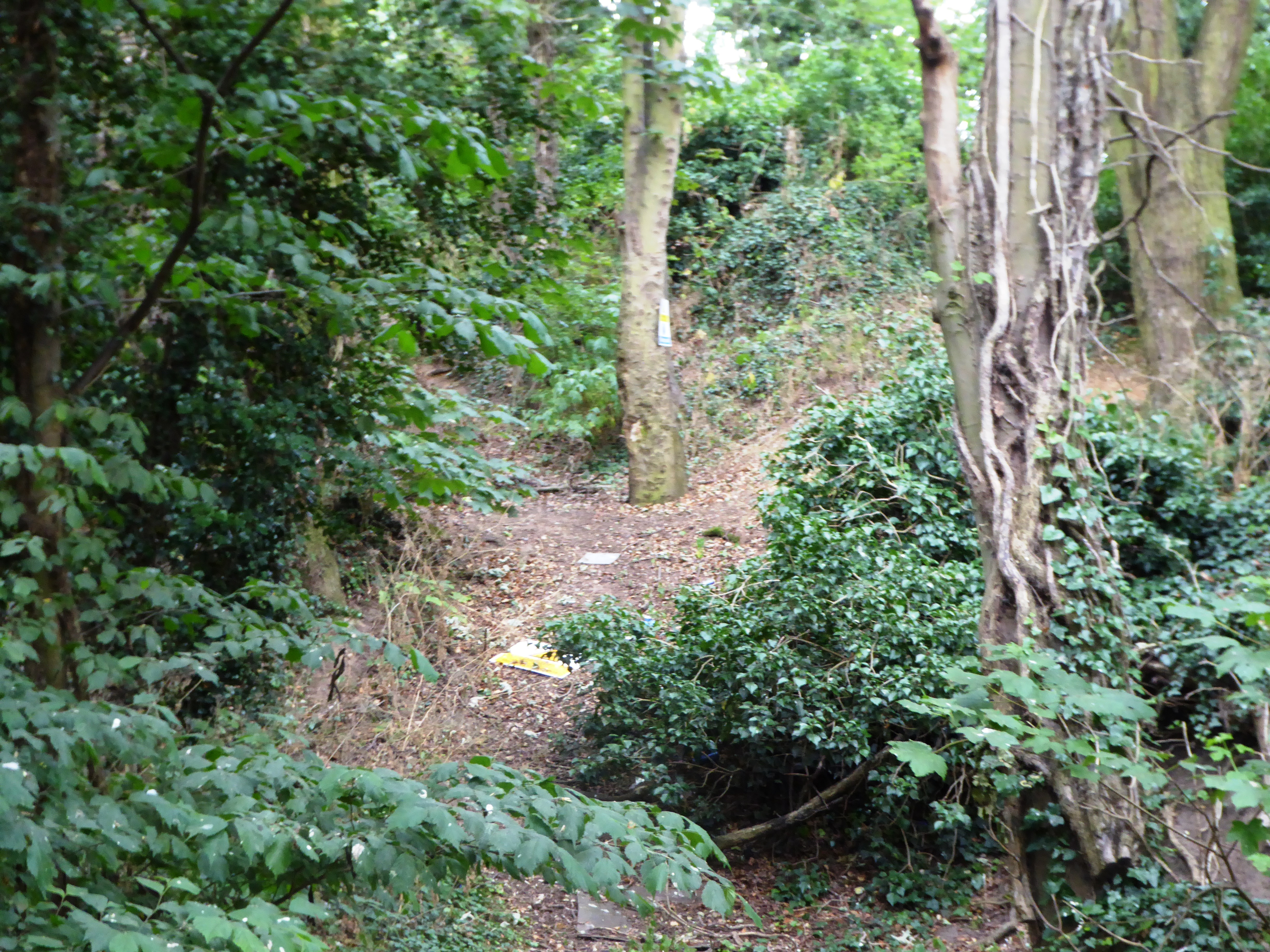
- Location of Catton Grove Chalk Pit.
- Area of search: Norfolk, England
- Grid reference: TG 228 108
- Interest: Geological
- Area: 0.6 hectares (1.5 acres)
- Notification date: 1986
- Location map: Magic Map

Catton Grove Chalk Pit is a 0.6-hectare (1.5-acre) geological Site of Special Scientific Interest on the northern outskirts of Norwich in Norfolk, England. It is a Geological Conservation Review site.

This Cretaceous site exposes rocks dating to the late Campanian, around 75 million years ago, and it is the type site for the Catton Sponge Bed. Its well preserved fossils include many undescribed sponges and important ammonites.

The site is private land with no public access.
