= Anthony Catt =

English cricketer (1933–2018)

Personal information
- Full name: Anthony Waldron Catt
- Born: 2 October 1933; Dormansland, Surrey (Note: Most sources list Catt as having been born at Edenbridge, Kent. His obituary in the Kent County Cricket Club Annual, 2019, reveals that his birth certificate shows Dormansland as his place of birth – although his Wisden obituary gives it as Ipswich.)
- Died: 6 August 2018 (aged 84); Rondebosch, Cape Town, South Africa
- Batting: Right-handed
- Role: Wicket-keeper

Domestic team information
- Years: Team
- 1954–1964: Kent
- 1965/66–1967/68: Western Province

Career statistics
Competition	First-class	List A
Matches	138	2
Runs scored	3,123	20
Batting average	17.25	10.00
100s/50s	1/9	0/0
Top score	162	18
Balls bowled	18	0
Wickets	0	–
Bowling average	–	–
5 wickets in innings	–	–
10 wickets in match	–	–
Best bowling	–	–
Catches/stumpings	284/37	0/0
- Source: CricInfo, 15 April 2017

Anthony Waldron Catt (2 October 1933 – 6 August 2018) was an English cricketer who played as a wicket-keeper for Kent County Cricket Club. He made his first-class cricket debut in 1954 against Oxford University. He died in August 2018 aged 84.

== Early life ==
Catt was born at Dormansland in Surrey where his father was a chauffeur. He was educated at Tower Ramparts Secondary Modern School in Ipswich.

== Cricket career ==
Catt had played for the Army cricket team in 1952 and began appearing for Kent's Second XI in 1954, having taken part in a pre-season trial. He won his Second XI cap in 1955, and played occasionally in the First XI until 1958, deputising along with Derek Ufton when Godfrey Evans was playing for England. On Evans' retirement in 1959 Catt and Ufton shared the wicket-keeping duties until Ufton's retirement in 1962 allowed Catt to play more games, appearing 21 times in 1962, 30 in 1963 and 20 in 1964. He scored 905 runs in 1962, a career high. Catt moved to South Africa after the 1964 season and was replaced as Kent's main wicket-keeper by Alan Knott who had begun to establish himself during 1964. He played 12 matches for Western Province in South Africa.

In August 1955, when Northamptonshire made 374 in their first innings against Kent the total included 73 extras and Catt conceded 48 byes and 23 leg byes. In mitigation he was said to be suffering from the effects of "what was officially stated to be sunburn". The total of byes and leg byes conceded remains a County Championship records as of 2019.

Catt's highest score in first-class cricket came when he was used as a nightwatchman against Leicestershire in 1962. Having survived until stumps, the following day he scored 121 in the morning session, finishing with a score of 162, his only first-class century despite being considered a "class" batsman and having made a score of 201 for the Second XI in 1959.

In total, Catt made 138 first-class appearances, including 118 in the County Championship and nine in the Currie Cup. He played twice for Kent in the Gillette Cup as one-day cricket became established in the early 1960s. He scored 3,123 first-class runs and claimed 321 victims behind the stumps.

== Death ==
Catt died at Rondebosch a suburb of Cape Town, South Africa in August 2018. He was aged 84.
