= Chato, Ghana =

Challo
- Village
- Location in Ghana
- Coordinates: 10°39′29″N 001°55′50″W
- Country: Ghana
- Region: Upper West
- District: Sissala East

Chato or Challo is a village in Sissala East Municipal District, Upper West Region of Ghana, West Africa.
