= High Catton =

Village in the East Riding of Yorkshire, England

Coordinates: 53.974175°N 0.907891°W

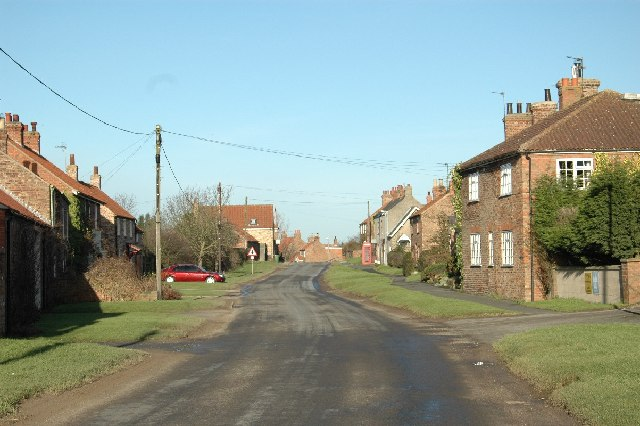
- Main street, High Catton

- Location within the East Riding of Yorkshire
- OS grid reference: SE717536
  - London: 170 mi (270 km) S
- Civil parish: Catton
- Unitary authority: East Riding of Yorkshire
- Ceremonial county: East Riding of Yorkshire
- Region: Yorkshire and the Humber
- Country: England
- Sovereign state: United Kingdom
- Post town: YORK
- Postcode district: YO41
- Dialling code: 01759
- Police: Humberside
- Fire: Humberside
- Ambulance: Yorkshire
- UK Parliament: Goole and Pocklington

High Catton is a village and former civil parish, now in the parish of Catton, in the East Riding of Yorkshire, England. It is situated approximately 6 miles (10 km) north-west of the market town of Pocklington and about 1 mile (1.6 km) south of the village of Stamford Bridge. The village of Low Catton and the River Derwent are 1 mile to the west. In 1931 the parish had a population of 174. From 1866 High Catton was a civil parish in its own right, on 1 April 1935 the parish was abolished and merged with Low Catton to form "Catton".

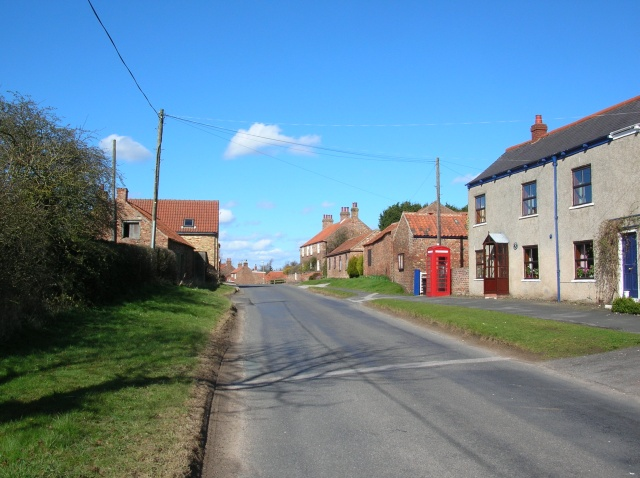
Main street

In 1823 High Catton was in the civil parish of Low Catton. Population at the time was 198. Occupations included eleven farmers, a tailor, a joiner & carpenter, a wheelwright, and the landlord of Woodpecker Lass public house. There were also three yeomen. Two carriers operated between the village and York once a week.

The name Catton probably derives from either the Old English personal name Catta or the Old Norse personal name Kati, and the Old English tūn meaning 'settlement'. It has also been suggested that the first element is derived from the Old English catt meaning 'cat'.

== See also ==
- Listed buildings in Catton, East Riding of Yorkshire
