= Kett =

Kett is a surname. Notable people with the surname include:

- Etta Kett, title character in the comic strip by Paul Robinson
- Francis Kett (1547–1589), Anglican clergyman burned for heresy
- Franziska Kett (born 2004), German footballer
- Hedley Kett (1913–2014), British naval officer and submariner
- Henry Kett (1761–1825), versatile English clergyman, academic and writer
- Kett Turton (born 1982), Canadian actor
- Rlinda Kett, fictional character from the Saga of Seven Suns series of novels by Kevin J. Anderson
- Robert Kett (c1492–1549), Loyal Rebel: Leader of Kett's Rebellion
- Tony Kett (1951–2009), Irish Fianna Fáil politician and member of Seanad Éireann

== See also ==
- Etta Kett, long-run comic strip created by Paul Robinson
- Kett's Rebellion, enclosure-related revolt in Norfolk during the reign of Edward VI of England
- KETT
