= Catts =

Catts is a surname. Notable people with the name include:

- Dorothy M. Catts (1877–1961), Australian writer, editor and businesswoman (wife of James)
- James Catts (1877–1951), Australian politician, unionist and businessman (husband of Dorothy)
- Oron Catts, Australian artist
- Sidney Johnston Catts (1863–1936), American politician

== See also ==
- Cats (disambiguation)
