= Catton, East Riding of Yorkshire =

Civil parish in England

Coordinates: 53°58′N 0°54′W

Catton
- Civil parish
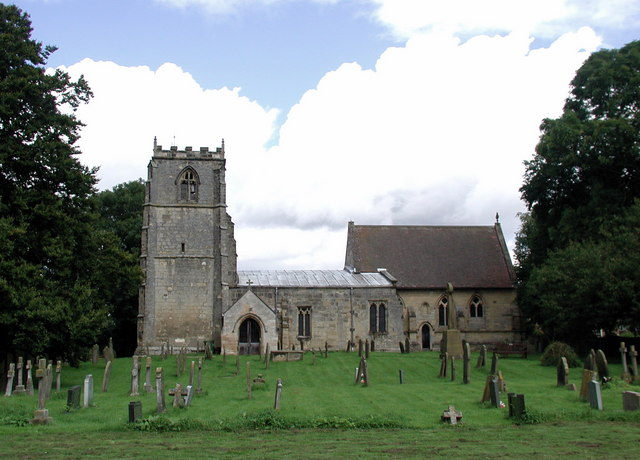
- All Saints Church, Low Catton

- Population: 348 (2011 census)
- OS grid reference: SE721528
- Civil parish: Catton
- Unitary authority: East Riding of Yorkshire
- Ceremonial county: East Riding of Yorkshire
- Region: Yorkshire and the Humber
- Country: England
- Sovereign state: United Kingdom
- Post town: YORK
- Postcode district: YO41
- Police: Humberside
- Fire: Humberside
- Ambulance: Yorkshire
- UK Parliament: Goole and Pocklington
- Website: Catton Parish Council

Catton is a civil parish in the East Riding of Yorkshire, England. It is situated 6 miles (10 km) to the north-west of the market town of Pocklington and covering an area of 1,233 hectares (3,050 acres). It lies on the east bank of the River Derwent that forms the boundary with the unitary authority of the City of York. The A1079 road crosses the river just north of Kexby Old Bridge which is designated a Grade II* listed building in and is now recorded in the National Heritage List for England, maintained by Historic England.

The civil parish is formed by the villages of High Catton and Low Catton. According to the 2011 UK census, Catton parish had a population of 348, an increase on the 2001 UK census figure of 284.

== See also ==
- Listed buildings in Catton, East Riding of Yorkshire
