= Chatton (surname) =

Chatton is a surname. Notable people with the surname include:

- Édouard Chatton (1883–1947), French biologist
- Charlotte Chatton (born 1975), English actress
- Walter Chatton (c.1290–1343), English theologian and philosopher
- Harry Chatton (born 1899), Irish footballer
