= Chatos Islands =

Group of small islands in Antarctica

- Location within Antarctic Peninsula

Geography
- Location: Antarctica
- Coordinates: 67°39′S 69°10′W

Administration
- Administered under the Antarctic Treaty System

Demographics
- Population: Uninhabited

The Chatos Islands are a group of small islands and rocks lying south of Cape Adriasola, Adelaide Island. The descriptive name Islotes Chatos (flat islands) was given by the Argentine Antarctic Expedition of 1952–53.

== See also ==
- List of Antarctic and sub-Antarctic islands
