= Chatto & Windus =

British book publisher

- Parent company: Penguin Random House
- Status: Acquired
- Founded: 1855; 171 years ago
- Founder: John Camden Hotten, Andrew Chatto, William Edward Windus
- Successor: Vintage Books
- Country of origin: United Kingdom
- Headquarters location: London, England
- Official website: penguin.co.uk/chatto-windus

Chatto & Windus is an imprint of Penguin Random House that was formerly an independent book publishing company founded in London in 1855 by John Camden Hotten. Following Hotten's death, the firm reorganized under the names of his business partner Andrew Chatto and poet William Edward Windus. The company was purchased by Random House in 1987 and is now a sub-imprint of Vintage Books within the Penguin UK division.

== History ==
The firm developed out of the publishing business of John Camden Hotten, founded in 1855. After his death in 1873, it was sold to Hotten's junior partner Andrew Chatto (1841–1913), who took on as a partner the poet William Edward Windus (1827–1910), son of the patron of J. M. W. Turner, Benjamin Godfrey Windus (1790–1867). Chatto & Windus published Mark Twain, W. S. Gilbert, Wilkie Collins, H. G. Wells, Wyndham Lewis, Richard Aldington, Frederick Rolfe (as Fr. Rolfe), Aldous Huxley, Samuel Beckett, the "unfinished" novel Weir of Hermiston (1896) by Robert Louis Stevenson, and the first translation into English of Marcel Proust's novel À la recherche du temps perdu (Remembrance of Things Past, C. K. Scott-Moncrieff, 1922), among others.

In 1946, the company took over the running of the Hogarth Press, founded in 1917 by Leonard and Virginia Woolf. It published broadly in the field of literature, including novels and poetry. It is not connected, except in the loosest historical fashion, with Pickering & Chatto Publishers.

Chatto & Windus became a limited company in 1953, and it was active as an independent publishing house until 1969, when it merged with Jonathan Cape. Norah Smallwood was appointed to the board, and later succeeded Ian Parsons as chairman and managing director in 1975, serving until her retirement in 1982.

Chatto, along with Jonathan Cape and Virago Press, were purchased by Penguin Random House in 1987. As of 2019, Chatto & Windus is an imprint of Vintage Publishing UK.

== Book series ==
- Ancient Culture and Society
- The BBC Reith Lectures
- Books for Today
- Brief Lives (also published by Nan A. Talese/Doubleday in United States as Ackroyd's Brief Lives)
- Britain in the World Today (also published by Johns Hopkins Press, Baltimore)
- Central African Archives: Oppenheimer Series
- The Centaur Library
- Chatto & Windus Paperbacks
- Chatto and Windus's Colonial Library
- Chatto & Windus' Sixpenny Novels
- Chatto Anthologies (sometimes referred to as "Chatto Book of" series)
- Chatto Counterblasts
- Chatto Curiosities of the British Street
- Chatto Nature Guides
- Chatto Pocket Library
- Chatto Poetry
- Chatto Poets for the Young
- Children's Life in Other Lands Series
- Collected Works: Aldous Huxley
- Columbus Centre Series (for Sussex University Press) (joint publisher: Heinemann Educational)
- The Complete Works of Bret Harte
- Compact Poets
- Dawn of History Series
- The Dolphin Books
- Dumpy Books for Children
- The Golden Library
- Gotham Library
- The Great Songwriters
- Immortals of Science (this series originally published by Franklin Watts, Inc., New York)
- The Key of the Kingdom
- The Khaki Library
- The King's Classics
- The Landmark Library
- Life and Art in Photograph (republished in the United States by Oxford University Press, New York)
- London Limited Editions
- Mathematics for Science and Technology
- The Mayfair Library
- The Medieval Library
- Modern Science: Physics and Chemistry
- Modular Textbooks in Engineering
- My Life And Times: Compton Mackenzie
- National Benzole Books
- The New Medieval Library
- The New Phoenix Library
- New Piccadilly Library
- Pelham Library
- Phoenix Anthologies Series
- The Phoenix Library (revived in 1950 as The New Phoenix Library)
- Phoenix Library of Food and Drink
- The Phoenix Living Poets
- Phoenix Novels
- Piccadilly Library Series
- Piccadilly Novels
- Play Ideas Series (AKA Play Ideas and Things-to-do Series)
- The Queen's Classics
- The Reform Series
- Richmond Lectures
- The Robins Series
- Royal Road Readers
- The Shakespeare Library, comprising the series (1) The Old-Spelling Shakespeare; (2) The Shakespeare Classics; (3) The Lamb Shakespeare for the Young; and (4) Shakespeare's England
- St Antony's Papers
- St Martin's Library
- The Stage Poet
- Studies in English History
- Studies in International Security (for the International Institute for Strategic Studies)
- Use of English Pamphlets
- The Vampire Chronicles
- The Vanguard Library
- Young Learner Books
- Zodiac Books (reissue of The Zodiac Press series)
