= Andrew Chatto =

English publisher and editor (1840–1913)

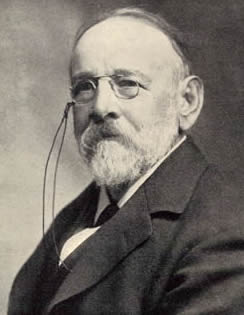
- Born: 11 November 1840; Camden Town, London, England
- Died: 15 March 1913 (aged 72); Radlett, Hertfordshire, England
- Occupation: Publisher
- Years active: 1855–1912
- Known for: Honest dealing with his authors
- Notable work: Increasing access to good literature through low cost editions

Andrew Chatto (11 November 1840 – 15 March 1913) was an English book publisher known for his role in the book publishing company Chatto & Windus.

== Early life ==
Chatto – known throughout his life as "Dan" – was born on 11 November 1840 at 55 Pratt Street, Camden Town, London, third of five sons and three daughters of the author William Andrew Chatto (1799–1864) and Margaret Roberts (c. 1804 – April 1852), daughter of Luke Birch, of Cornhill, London. Aged 15, he joined the book-selling business of John Camden Hotten, beginning as a "runner" at book auctions. Hotten had opened a small bookshop at London at 151b Piccadilly the year before Chatto joined the firm; Hotten diversified into publishing, with Chatto learning the trade alongside him.

== Chatto & Windus ==
Hotten died suddenly in 1873, and Chatto bought the firm from his widow for £25,000. The money came from William Edward Windus (1828–1910) (Note: Sometimes confused with the diffident English Pre-Raphaelite painter William Lucas Windus (1822–1907). Windus the poet also painted watercolours.), the partnership being therefore named Chatto & Windus. Windus was a silent partner, leaving the business decisions to Chatto and living for some of the time on the Isle of Man. The two men had probably met when Hotten published Windus's first volume of verse in 1871.

When Chatto took over from Hotten, there were a number of legacy problems, resulting in part from Hotten's somewhat shady business practices. (Note: Hotten was also a pornographer, while still remaining respectable.) In particular, Hotten had alienated the poet Algernon Charles Swinburne by paying him little if any of the profits from the publication of his Poems and Ballads, which had sold well. Chatto mended fences by sending Swinburne a cheque for £50 and a formal request to publish his work. Chatto subsequently published Swinburne's Bothwell.

The biographer Catherine Peters contrasted Chatto who was "not only an active and successful publisher, but an honest one", compared with Hotten, "who was something of a rogue". Hotten had spent years in the United States and knew more about American literature than any other publisher in London. He made ruthless use of this knowledge to pirate works by American authors, as few had taken any steps to copyright their work in England.

One of the Hotten's victims was Mark Twain, but Chatto managed to establish good relations with him and they became good friends. Despite his speech, Chatto enjoyed very good relations with Mark Twain. Chatto worked his charm with other authors also, and Robert Louis Stevenson said: "If you don't know that you have a good author, I know I have a good publisher. Your fair, open and handsome dealings are a good point in my life, and do more for my crazy health than has yet been done by any doctor."

In 1876, Chatto brought in Percy Spalding to help him manage the firm. Spalding was much more of a financial manager than a literary man, so Chatto was left to decide editorial matters himself.

During the 1880s, Chatto was determined to make his firm the leading publisher of novels in London, and set out to dramatically increase their list. He bought the rights to the existing works of popular novelists such as Ouida and Wilkie Collins, and then reprinting them in cheap editions. He bought the remaining stock and copyrights of Henry George Bohn for £20,000, which expanded the range and type of books that he published. His strategy was to dramatically increase the firm's share of the novel market, and be the first choice for novelists. He certainly won the good will of writers.

Chatto saw periodicals as another possible outlet for the firm's authors (and for the intellectual property that the firm had bought). He bought The Belgravia and its associated annual. He published The Idler from 1892 to 1911, and he also handled The Gentleman's Magazine.

Frank Arthur Swinnerton, who worked at the firm, recalls Chatto as "a gentle elderly man with a rolling walk, genially sweet in manner to every member of his staff, and much loved".

== Rujub the Juggler ==
The story of Rujub the Juggler illustrates two facets of Chatto's character, his support and encouragement for authors, the reason why Sutherland referred to the firm as "the 'hustlers" of the book trade". Chatto recognised and encouraged G. A. Henty's ability as a writer for adults. (Note: While Henty has hugely successful as an author of juvenile fiction he had less success with his novels for adults.) Chatto published four of Henty's eleven adult novels. Of these, Rujub, the Juggler was the biggest success, selling 11,000 copies, with most of these shortly after initial publication. Arnold said that the book had a period charm which he found surprising. and suggested that Henty's adult novels, which sold less than his juvenile titles, had been generally underrated.

Rujub was first published in book form (Note: It had been published as a newspaper serial in 1892 in Australia in the Sydney Echo, and in the United States in The Boston Globe.) as a "three-decker", or three-volume novel, (Note: This had been the standard format for adult novels, as it suited the circulating libraries, see Appendix II of Newbolt for a discussion on the economics of the three volume novel. Essentially the circulating libraries demanded that novels be produced in three volumes as this raised the price, thus increasing the attractiveness of libraries against individual purchase, as well as encouraging subscribers to take out a higher-rate subscription (as you could not take out three volumes at a time with the cheaper subscriptions).) without illustrations on 23 February 1893. The initial print run was for 500 copies. Chatto recognised that juveniles were also reading the Henty novels, and he published a single volume edition with eight illustrations by Stanley L. Wood in time for the Christmas market in 1893. Chatto had tremendous belief in Henty, and he ordered a print run of 3,000 for the illustrated edition (he had already printed 500 copies of the three-volume edition, and 2,000 of a single volume unillustrated "colonial" edition.) Chatto's actions sailed close to the wind on two accounts:

- Chatto has agreed to the condition, set by the two largest circulating libraries, Smith's and Mudie, in their simultaneous circulars on 27 June 1894, that, among other things, publishers could not issue a cheaper edition in the UK within twelve months of its first acceptance by the libraries. (Note: The delay to cheaper editions was to enable the circulating libraries to dispose of their extra copies on the second-hand market.) The cheaper illustrated one-volume edition was published within nine months of the three-volume library edition.
- Henty was under an exclusive contract for juvenile fiction with Blackie and Son. While an unillustrated three-volume novel was unquestionably for the adult market, the same could not be said of an illustrated single volume. Henty was concerned, and grew even more so in 1899 when Chatto released the book as a "presentation edition". (Note: Juvenile books were often given as school prizes or Christmas Gifts, so publishers produced presentation editions for this purpose.)
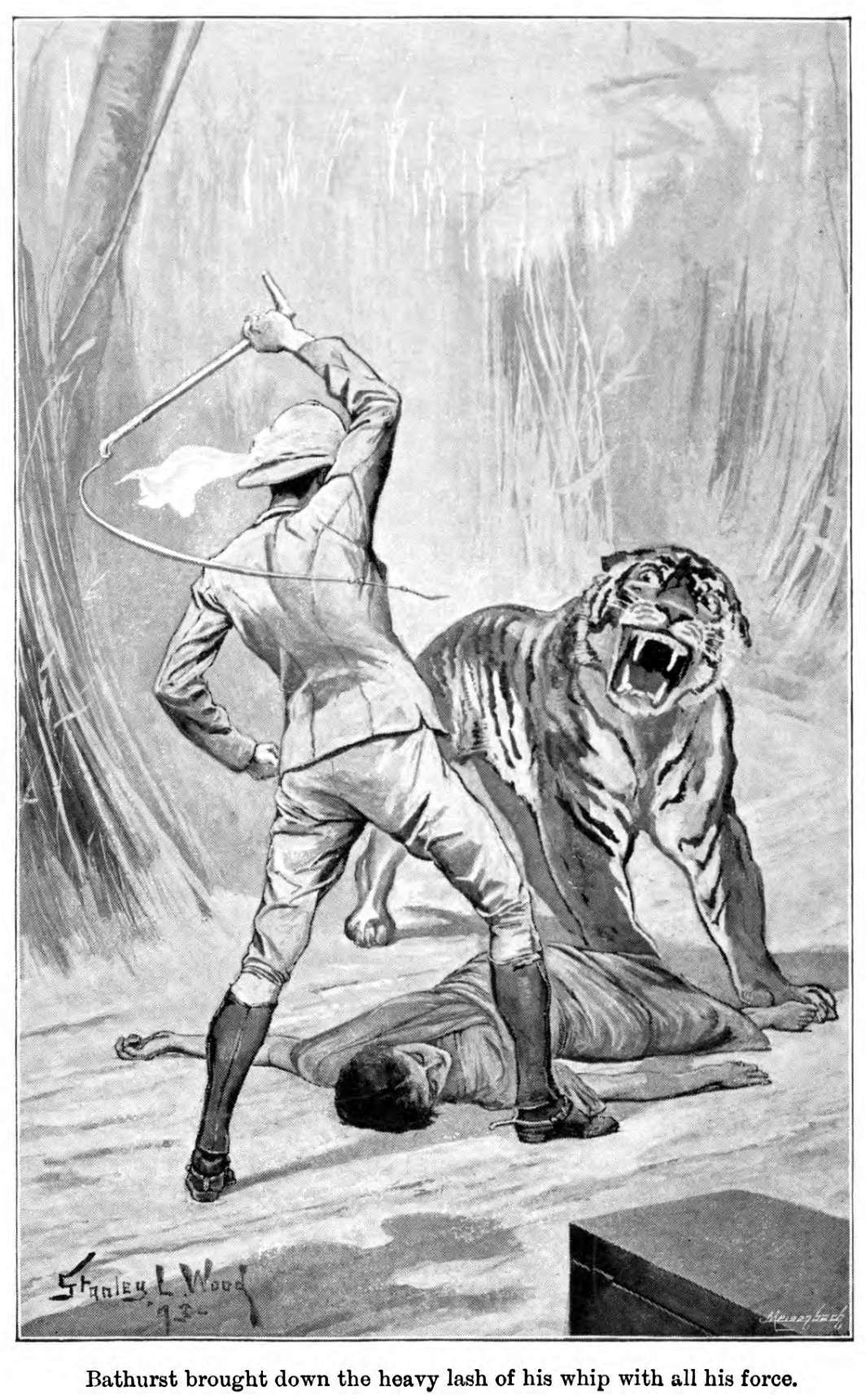
Page 011

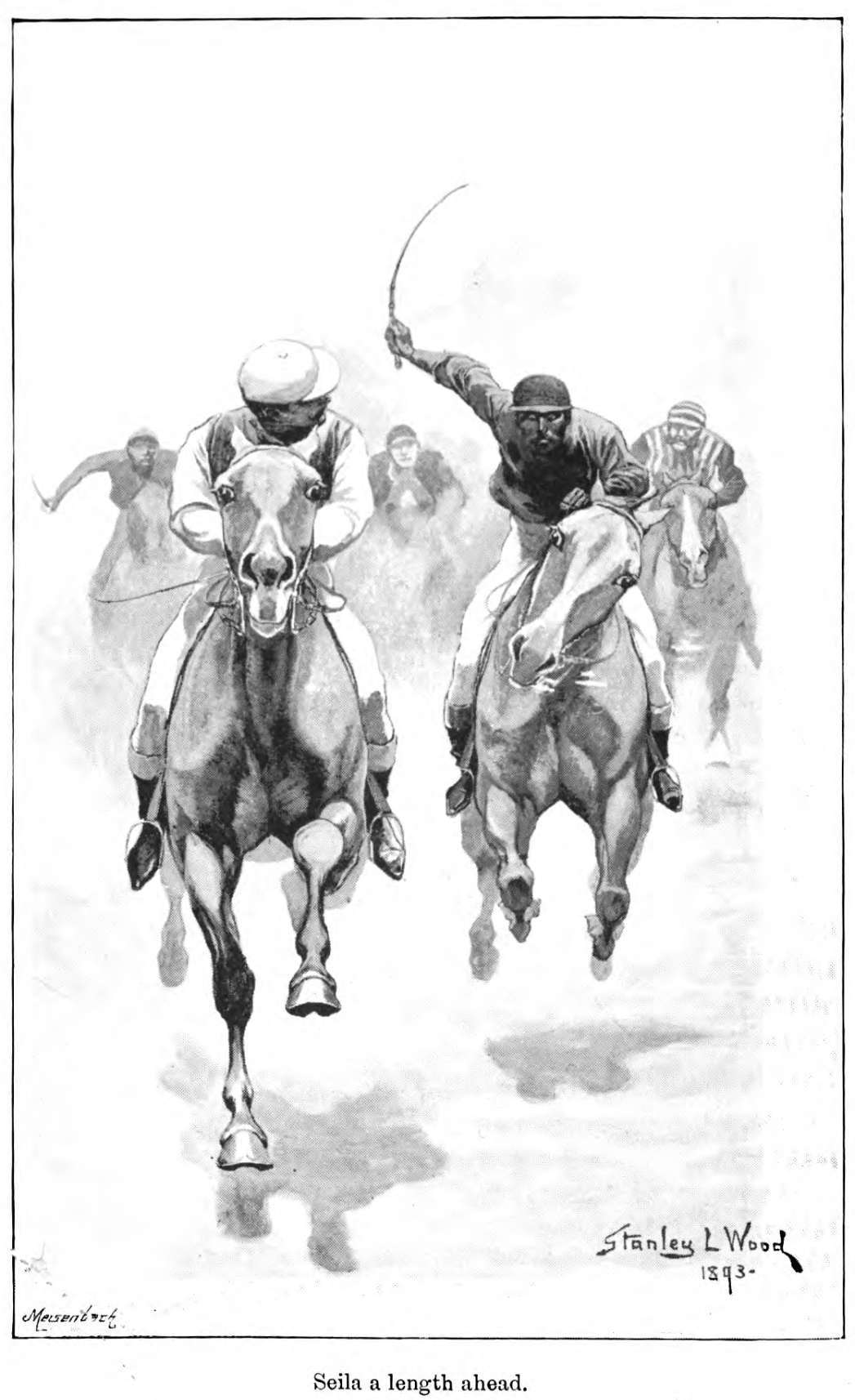
Page 075

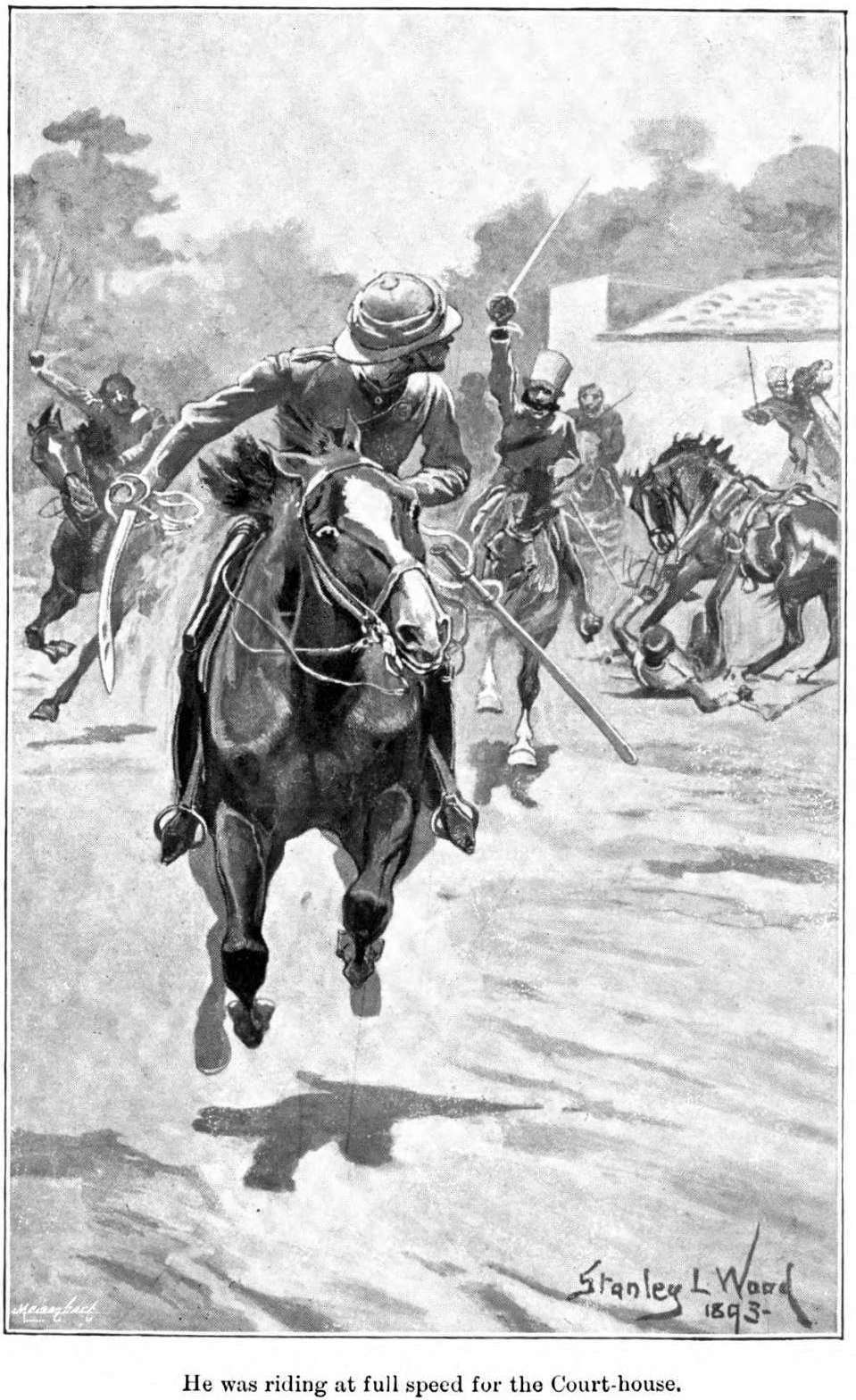
Page 170

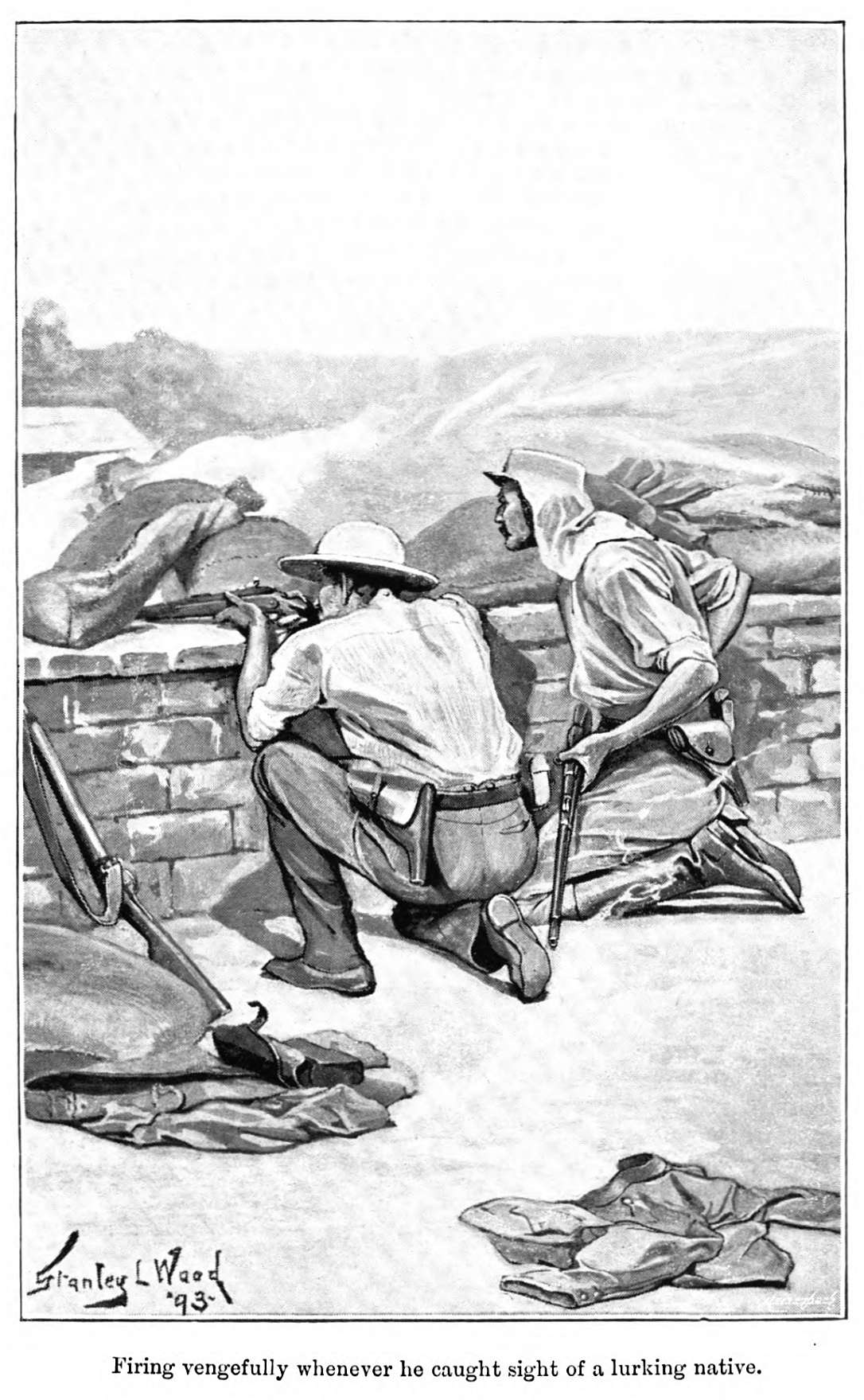
Page 182

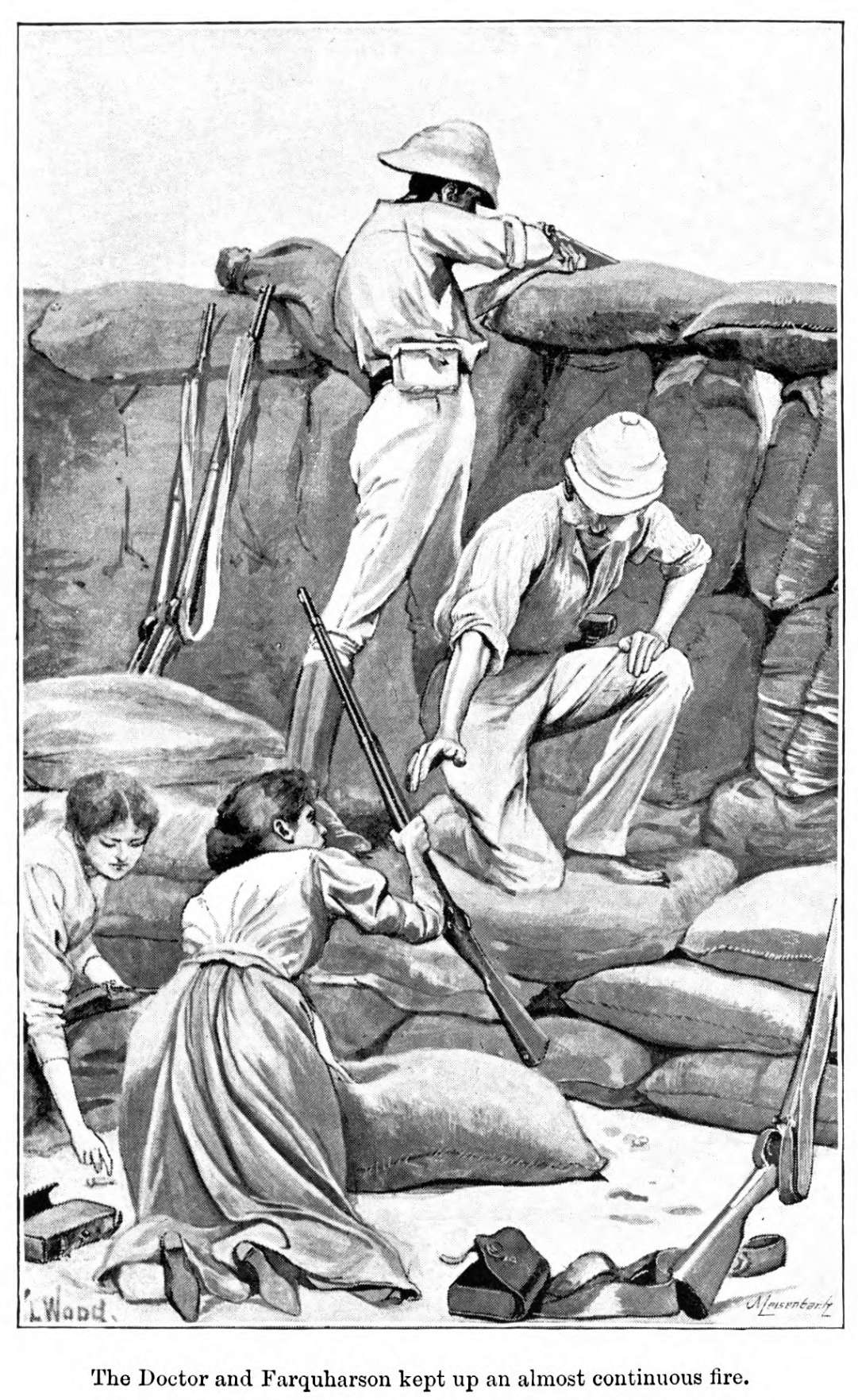
Page 221

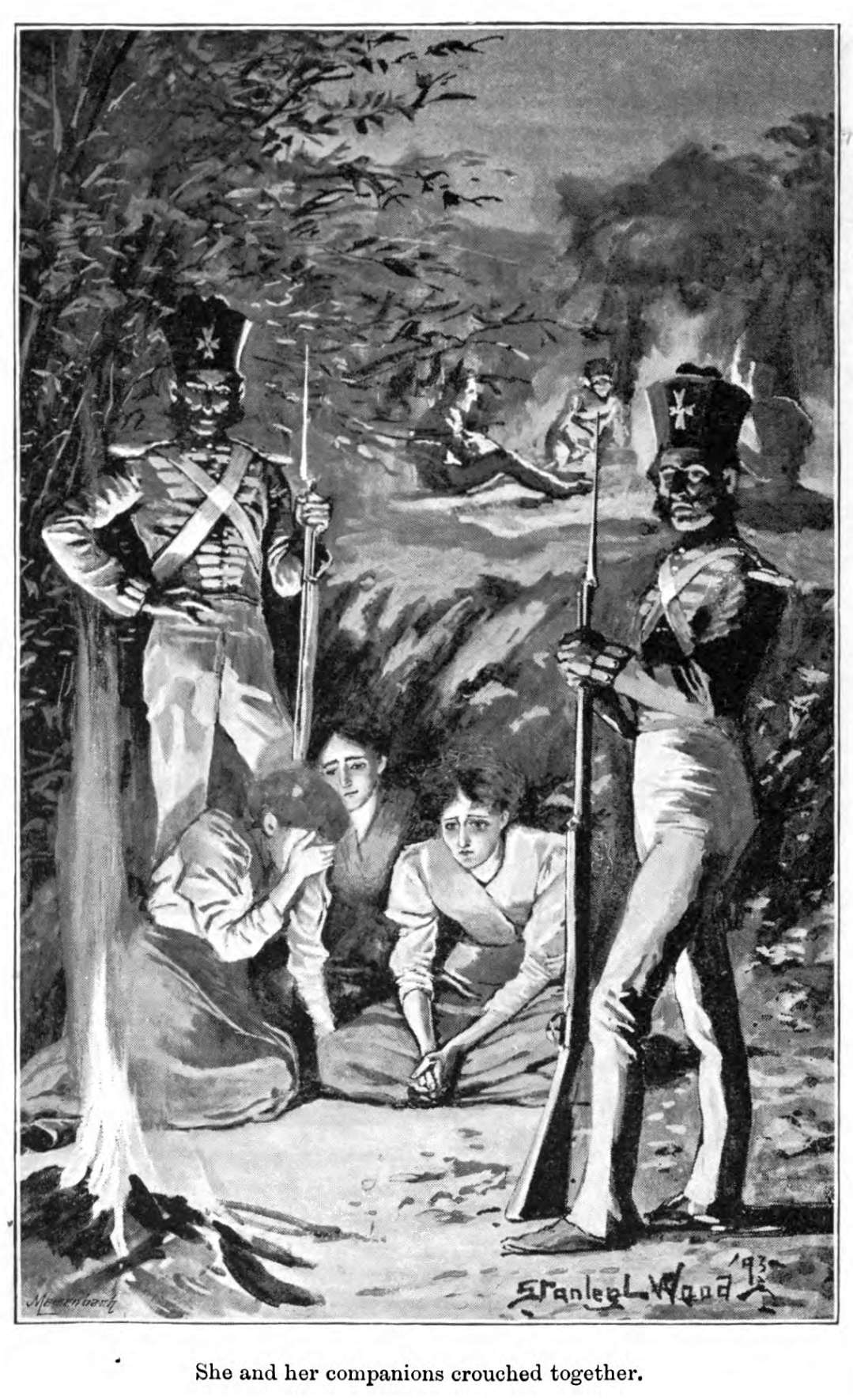
Page 273

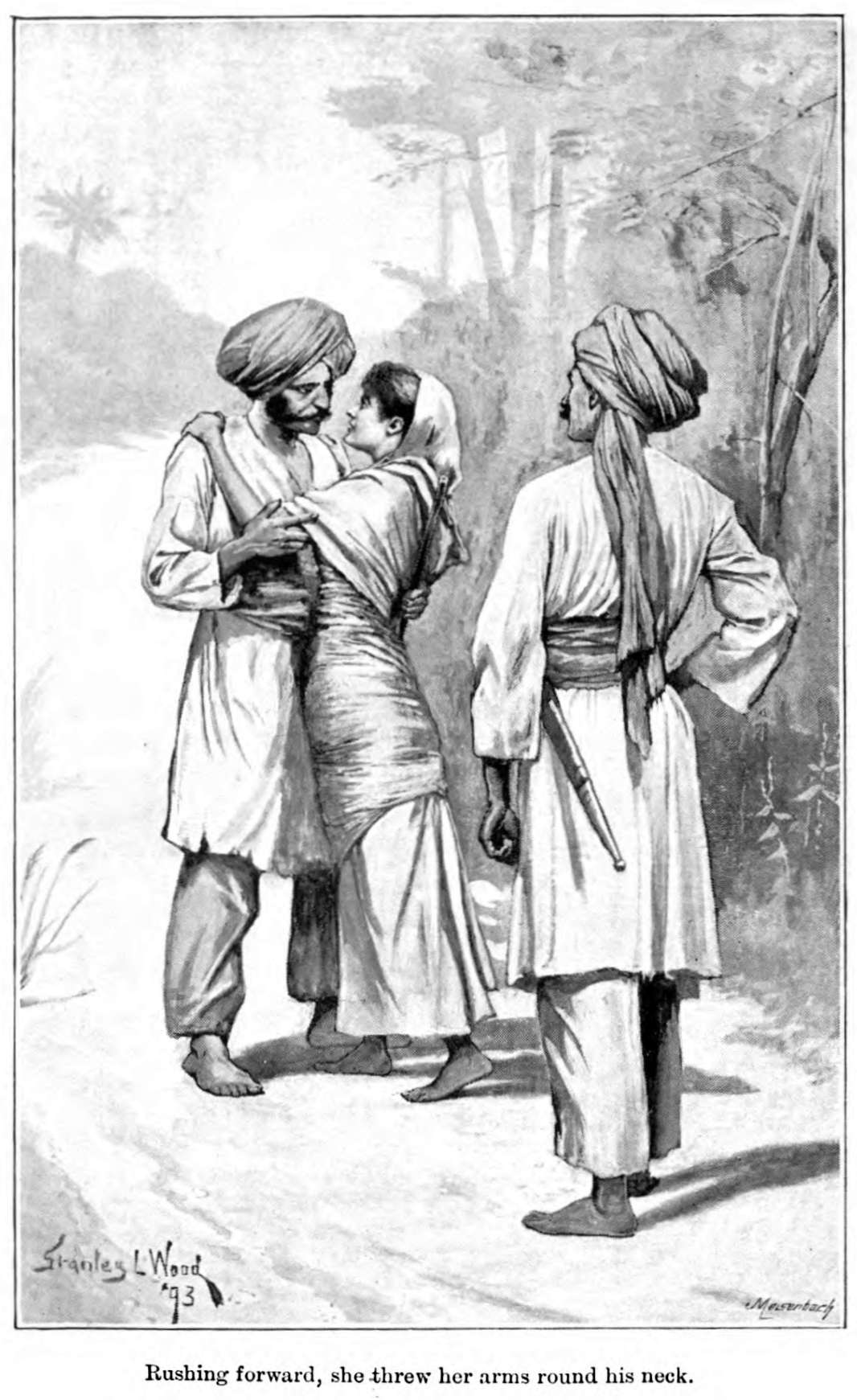
Page 305

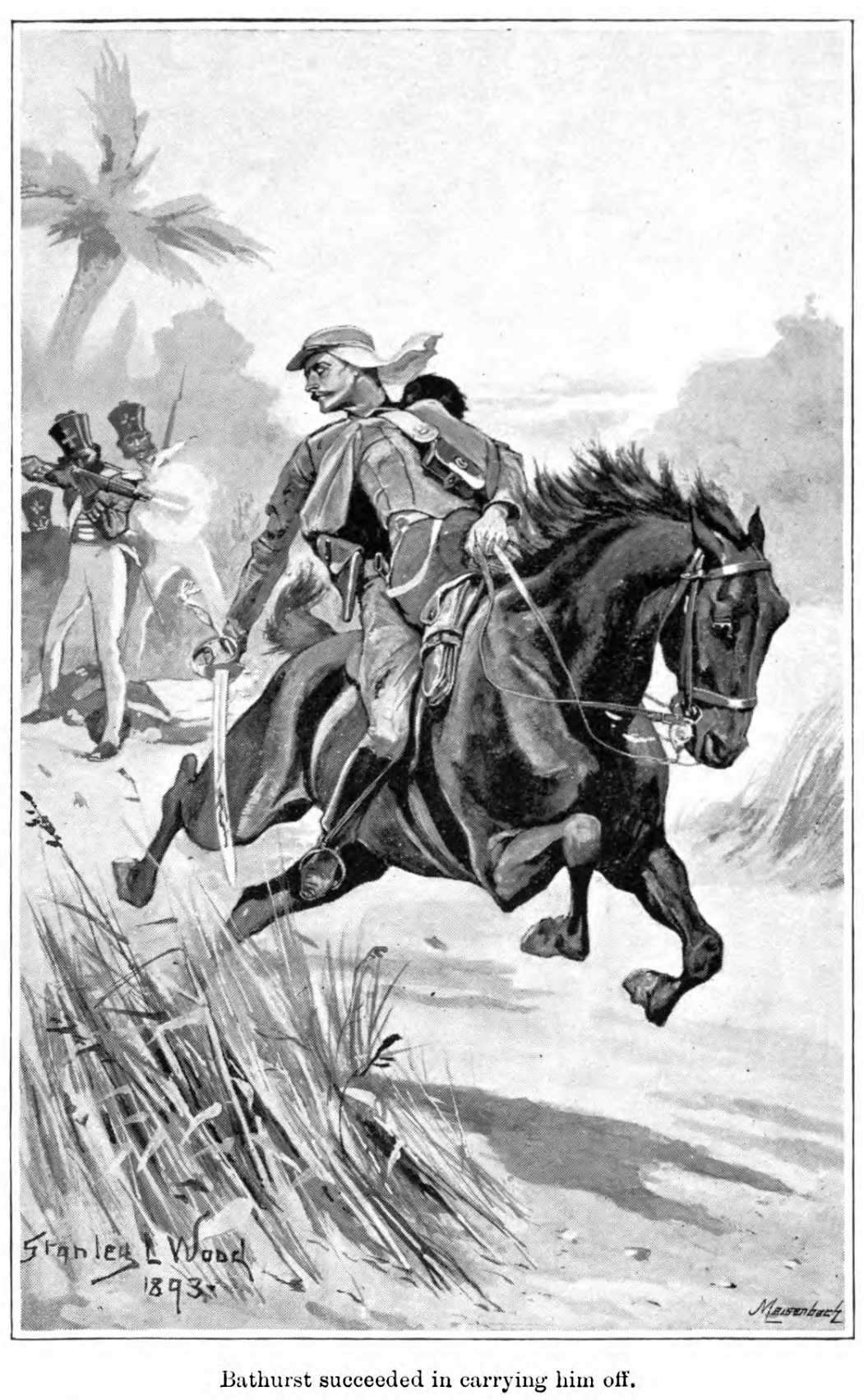
Page 329

== Private life ==
In his will, Chatto acknowledged fatherhood of four illegitimate children – two sons and two daughters – by his mistress, Catherine (also later "Katharine"), née Heard, wife of Joshua Radway. After her husband's death, she married Chatto in 1899. Katharine died on 11 October 1905.

== Later life ==
Chatto retired from publishing in 1912, and died 15 March 1913, at his daughter's home. In dying the year after he retired, Chatto was following the example of Windus, who retired from the firm in 1909 and died on 7 June of the following year. Chatto was cremated at Golders Green on 18 March 1913. His estate was valued at just over £14,000. His daughter Isobel retained possession of his papers, including handwritten letters, manuscripts and a few books, and sold them at Sotheby's in 1916.
