= A1079 road =

Road in Northern England

Coordinates: 53.77063°N 0.35448°W

A1079

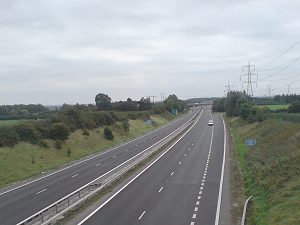
- A1079 Beverley Bypass, looking eastbound towards Kingston upon Hull

Major junctions
- From: Kingston upon Hull
- A63 A1105 A165 A1165 A1174 A1033 A164 A1035 A1034 A614 A166; A64 A1036
- To: York

Location
- Country: United Kingdom
- Primary destinations: Beverley

Road network
- Roads in the United Kingdom; Motorways; A and B road zones
| ← A1078 | → A1080 |

The A1079 is a major road in Northern England. It links the cities of York and Kingston upon Hull, both in Yorkshire. The road is noted for its past safety issues, and regularly features in the Road Safety Foundations reports on Britain's most dangerous roads. Campaigners have been calling for the entire route to be made into a dual carriageway.

== Route ==
The road begins in central York, heading east initially as Lawrence Street and then Hull Road. After 2 miles (3.2 km) it meets the A64 at the congested grade separated Grimston Bar roundabout and gains primary status. Continuing as Hull Road it passes Dunnington and Kexby, before heading into the East Riding of Yorkshire and passing Wilberfoss, Barmby Moor and Pocklington. A roundabout at Pocklington Industrial Estate was constructed in 2011. After going through Hayton the road becomes a dual carriageway for 1.5 miles (2.4 km), at the end of which is Shiptonthorpe, where the road becomes York Road. This was a Roman Road between York and Brough, and when it was dualled, various Roman artefacts were uncovered. Plans for a bypass, of Shiptonthorpe were put forward in the 1989 Roads for Prosperity white paper, but were later dropped.

The road meets the A614 (to Goole and Bridlington) at a roundabout, before bypassing Market Weighton. The bypass was opened in 1991 – prior to this the road went through the town centre, originally being the York – Market Weighton turnpike road. The bypass was built with one roundabout, at the junction with the A1034. A second roundabout, at Holme Road, was constructed in 2014. The road then goes through Bishop Burton before meeting the A1035 and A1174 at a roundabout west of Beverley at Killingwoldgraves.

The section from Killingwoldgraves roundabout to the northern outskirts of Hull is known as the Beverley Bypass; it passes around the southern side of Beverley, with a short dual carriageway section. The road crosses over the A164 (Beverley to Humber bridge) at a grade separated junction. It also bridges the Cottingham to Hull section of the Hull to Bridlington line, as well as the Cottingham to Dunwell road (Dunswell lane, underpassed). A new roundabout junction was constructed on the A1079 around 2011 for the Swift Leisure group caravan factory north of Cottingham, East Riding of Yorkshire.

The Beverley Bypass section terminates at a roundabout junction (Dunswell roundabout) with the A1033 and A1174 road. Here the A1079 loses its primary status as it heads into the centre of Kingston upon Hull as Beverley Road and later, Ferensway. The road terminates at the junction with the A63 (Hessle Road).

== About the road ==
Into the 1930s, the road continued past York on the course of what is now the A59, diverting at Green Hammerton and continuing to Boroughbrigde town centre, where it terminated at the Great North Road. Much of the road is built to single carriageway standard, although a 1.1-mile (1.8 km) stretch of the Beverley bypass and a 1.5-mile (2.4 km) stretch near Shiptonthorpe are of dual carriageway standard. The majority of the road is national speed limit (50 mph / 97 km/h on single carriageway sections (including Market Weighton hill), 70 mph (110 km/h) / 113 km/h on dual carriageway sections).

Following its de-trunking in 2003, the road is maintained by two authorities:

- East Riding of Yorkshire Council
- City of York Council

== Safety ==
The road had a reputation for being dangerous, primarily because the majority of it is single carriageway. Cars therefore have to turn across oncoming traffic to access adjoining roads. Between 1999 and 2005, emergency statistics revealed that there had been 615 accidents. A local campaign group Action Access A1079 (AAA1079) propose that in the long-term, more of the road be made dual carriageway to help combat these problems.

In the European Road Assessment Programme survey, which gives all major roads in Europe a safety rating, the A1079 is categorised as 'Medium-high risk' between Market Weighton and Hull, and 'Low-medium risk' between York and Market Weighton. The Market Weighton-Hull section was also identified in a EuroRAP report in June 2007 as being one of the 10 most dangerous roads in the UK, with 69 fatal or serious collisions between 2003 and 2005. In 2019, the A1079 was awarded a better safety record, now being identified as 'Low-Medium' risk for the section between York and Market Weighton, 'Medium' risk between Market Weighton and the outskirts of Hull. However the section through Hull is designated as a 'High-Risk' road.
