= Church Ope Cove =

Beach in Dorset, England

Coordinates: 50.5377°N 2.4273°W

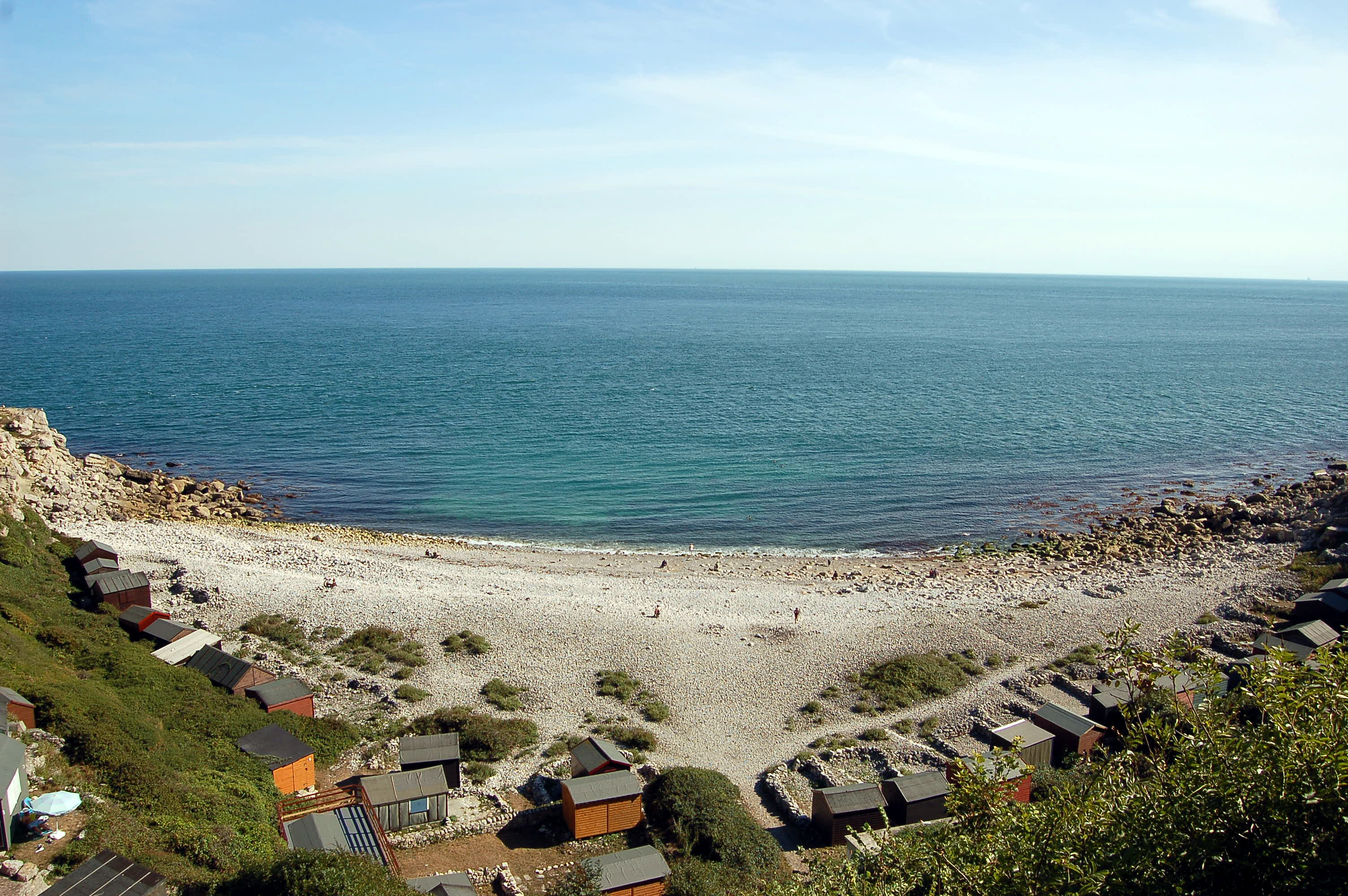
The cove, seen from the church ruins.

Church Ope Cove is a small secluded beach on the sheltered eastern side of the Isle of Portland in Dorset, southern England, and is part of the Jurassic Coast. It is found close to the village of Wakeham. The beach has many unusual features for the Isle of Portland. The beach used to be sandy, but quarry debris now covers the sand, and has been worn into rounded pebbles. The pebbles cover a small stream which runs to the sea, which is one of the few active streams remaining on the Isle of Portland.

== History ==
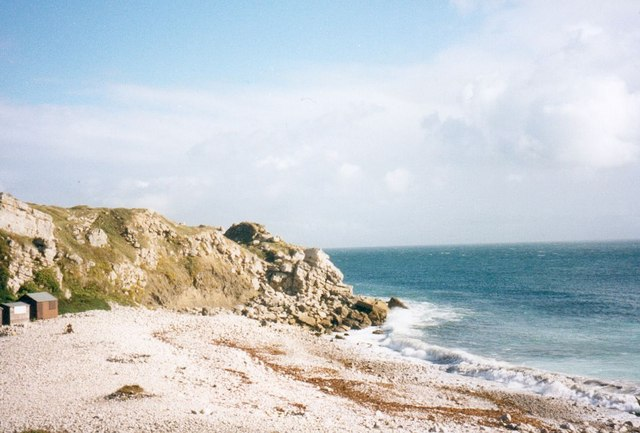
Church Ope Cove

In 789 AD, the first recorded Viking attack within British Isles, including Ireland, occurred on Portland's coast. It is believed that Church Ope Cove was the location. The exposed location was later defended by the Norman 12th-century Rufus Castle, built on the cliff-top overlooking the beach. The remaining castle seen today dates from the late 15th century. The cove's area was also used for the building of Portland's first parish church, St Andrew's Church, which was probably first established above the cove by the Saxons.

Between 1797 and 1800, John Penn, Governor of Portland and grandson of William Penn, the founder of Pennsylvania, had the Gothic revival mansion Pennsylvania Castle built on a platform above the cove. During the early 19th century he had a bath built below the gardens of his castle, known as John Penn's Bath. However, when it was completed, the Court Leet demanded an annual rent for its use after it was built on Common Land. Penn refused to pay, and the bath was abandoned, with the remains still in existence today. Penn's servants would have been tasked with bringing water up from the cove to the bath.

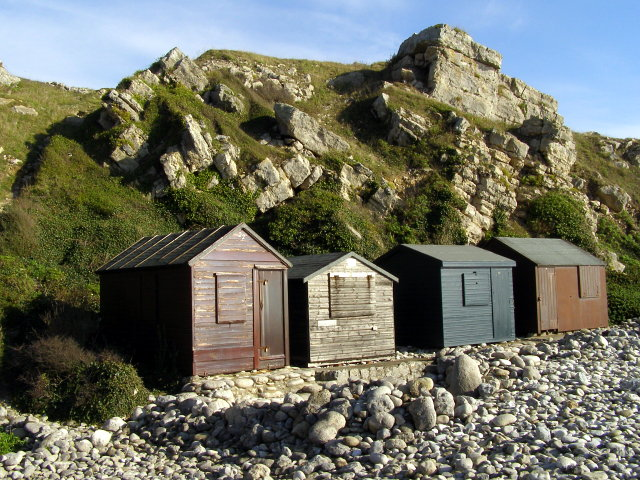
The four east-most beach huts on the beach at Church Ope Cove.

Portland had a large history of smuggling, and Church Ope Cove was one of the famous smuggling beaches. Into the 20th century, fishing was still an industry that used the beach for the launching of boats. For decades, an old rusting hand winch has been left lying on the beach, and is a reminder of the fishing trade. As part of the anti-invasion measures during World War II, two pillboxes were constructed to look over Church Ope Cove. A minefield was also placed at the back of the cove.

== Beach ==
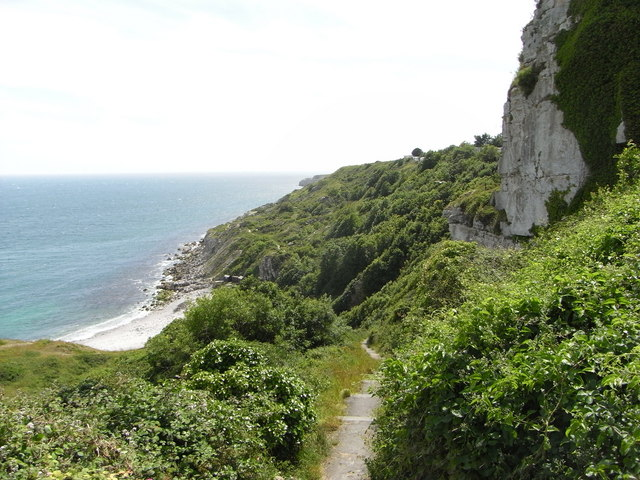
The path leading down to the cove, next to Rufus Castle.

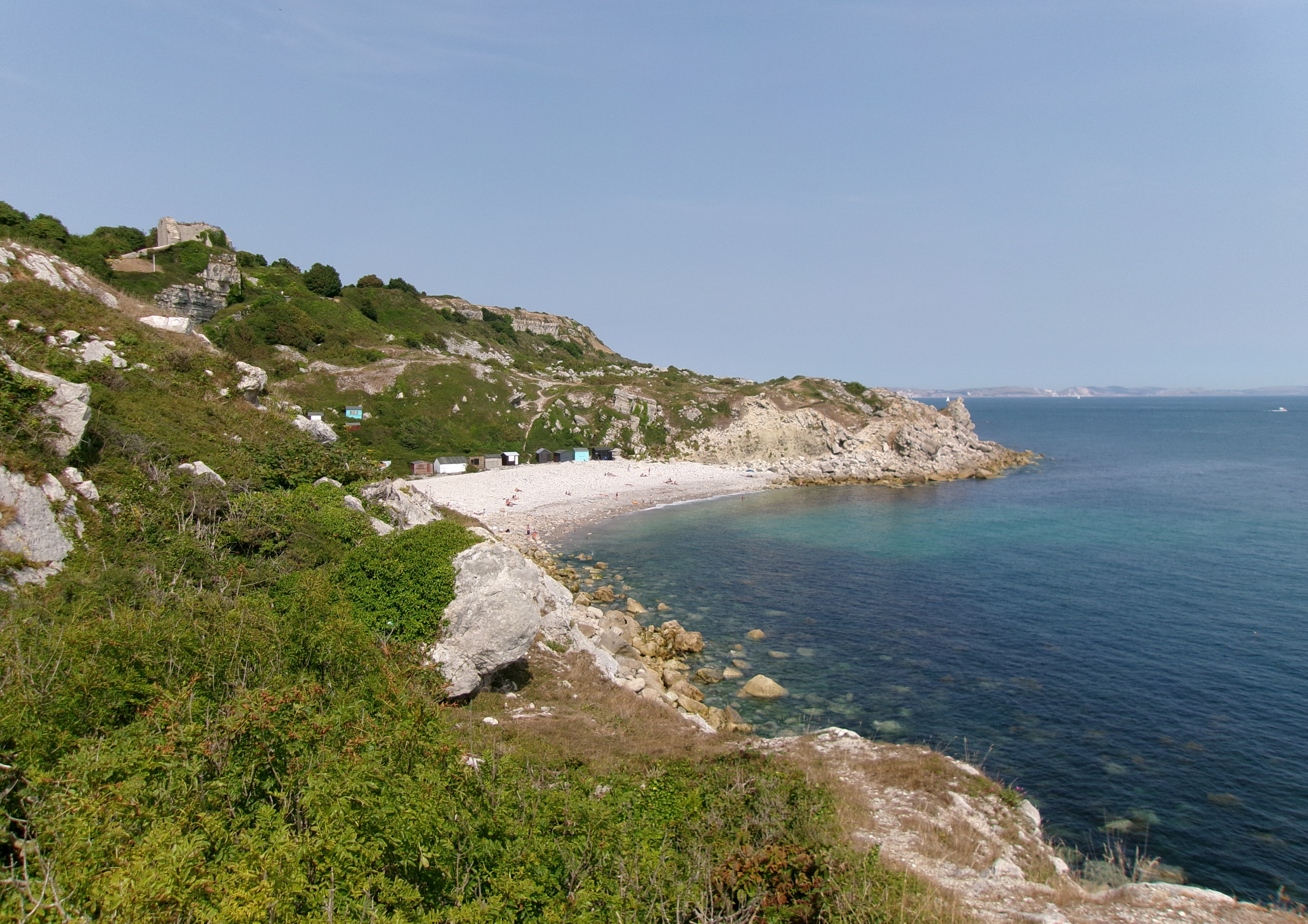
View of the cove from the south

The beach is one of the few beaches on Portland, and due to having cliffs on three sides, is often sheltered from prevailing wind. As the fishing industry declined, the cove became a favourite sheltered beach for swimming and today continues to be popular for fishing, snorkelling and swimming. The beach provides diving access to the numerous wrecks in the surrounding waters too, which has made it a popular area for diving too.

== Access ==
To access the beach there are two paths. The main path follows the road past Portland Museum and leads under the arch bridge of Rufus Castle, then down concrete steps to the cove. These were laid out by the local council in 1906, at a time when the beach was becoming increasingly popular as a recreational area. The view point above the steps, looking down on the cove, is part of the coastal path. The other path runs through a small area of woodland around the outside of Pennsylvania Castle, and passes through the ruins of St Andrew's Church (close to John Penn's Bath), before linking up over midway down the concrete steps to the cove.

== See also ==
- List of Dorset beaches
- Portland Museum, close to the cove
