= Wakeham =

Hamlet in Dorset, England

Coordinates: 50.542706°N 2.430769°W

- Location within Dorset
- Civil parish: Portland
- Unitary authority: Dorset
- Ceremonial county: Dorset
- Region: South West
- Country: England
- Sovereign state: United Kingdom
- Post town: Portland
- Postcode district: DT5
- Dialling code: 01305
- Police: Dorset
- Fire: Dorset and Wiltshire
- Ambulance: South Western
- UK Parliament: South Dorset

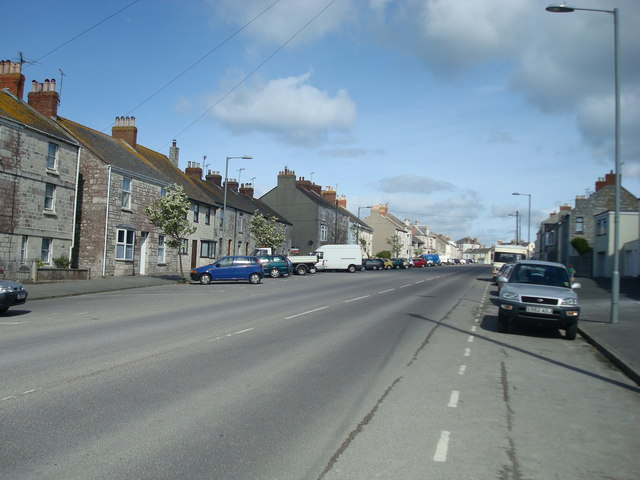
The main area of Wakeham

Wakeham is a hamlet near the village of Easton, in Tophill on the Isle of Portland in Dorset, England. It is situated between the Straits part of Easton, and Pennsylvania Castle. As with the rest of Portland's villages and settlements, Wakeham has been designated as a conservation area, as it is a place of special architectural and historic interest. Easton, Wakeham and Reforne were designated pre-1974. The hamlet features a distinctively wide road running through it, once built to allow space for horse-drawn carts transporting stone by road. Many of Wakeham's older buildings of the 17th and 18th century survive.

== History ==
Wakeham was established around a natural watercourse and various springs, which the Romans are likely to have developed. Among the archaeological finds of Wakeham are Roman stone sarcophagi, and Iron Age underground chambers. The original settlement was situated within the small valley at the south of the hamlet, and this land later became part of the grounds of Pennsylvania Castle. In 789 AD, the first recorded Viking attack within British Isles, including Ireland, occurred on Portland's coast. It is believed that Church Ope Cove was the location, and at the time would have shown Wakeham above it. The exposed location was later defended by the Norman 12th-century Rufus Castle. Wakeham was home to Portland's first parish church, St Andrew's Church, which was probably first established above the cove by the Saxons, and rebuilt in the 12th century. The church was later replaced in the 18th century by the new parish church St George's. During the construction of the new church, between 1754 and 1766, a temporary place of worship was established within Wakeham.

Between 1797 and 1800, John Penn, Governor of Portland and grandson of William Penn, the founder of Pennsylvania, had the Gothic revival mansion Pennsylvania Castle built on a platform above the cove, and at the bottom of Wakeham. In order to expand his land, he had Southwell Road diverted, and purchased a number of cottages at the bottom of Wakeham. From the 1840s onwards, Portland saw a large increase within its population due to the construction of Portland Harbour's breakwaters. With the need for housing, and the expansion of Portland's villages, Wakeham became part of Easton village. After the First World War, a number of inland quarries were opened around Wakeham area. Opposite Portland Museum at the bottom of Wakeham, a small quarry was opened to provide stone for the Whitehall Cenotaph. The museum was opened in 1930, after Marie Stopes donated two houses for a museum. Today Wakeham remains part of Easton, and is largely residential.

== Listed features ==
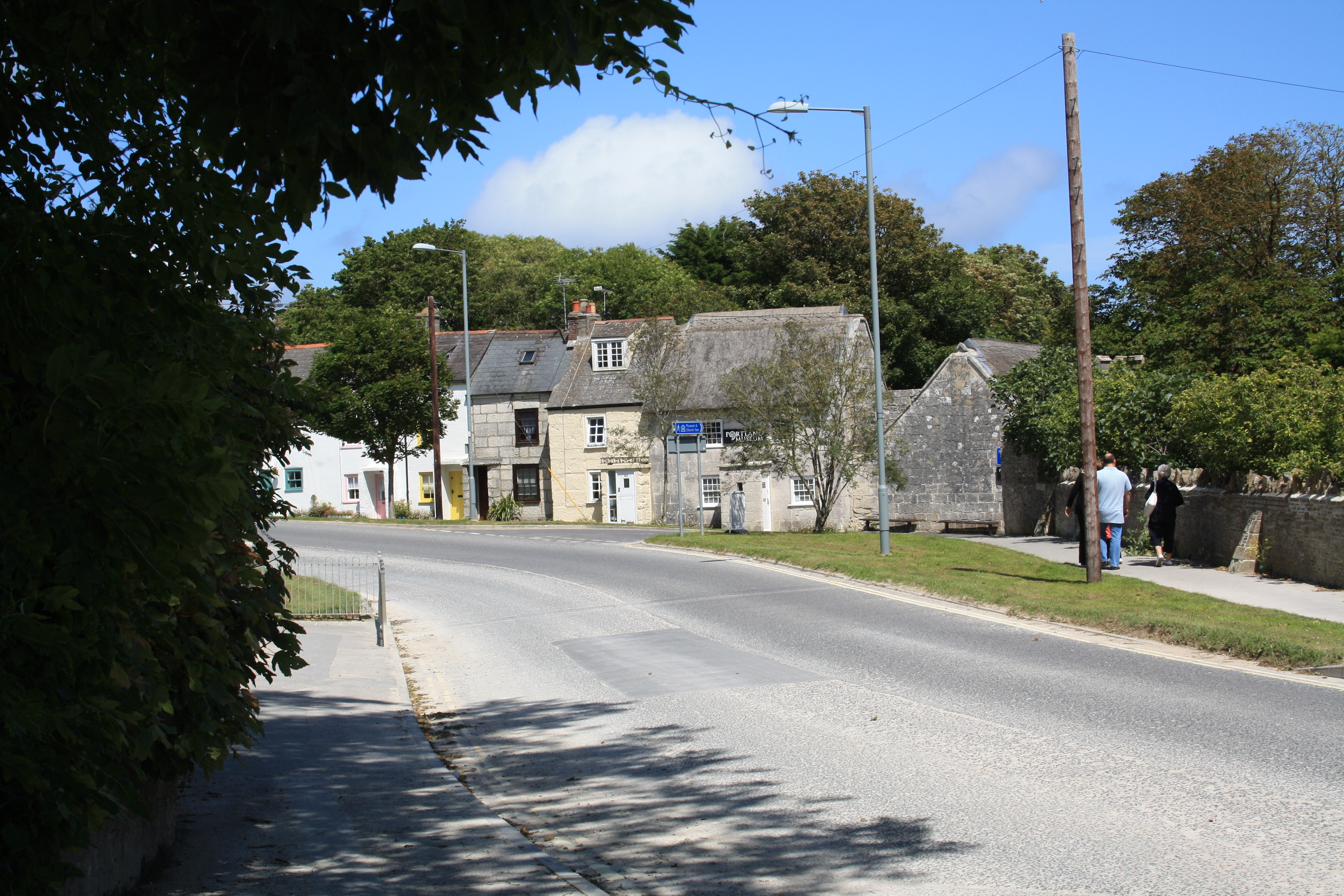
Part of Portland Museum and the entrance leading to Church Ope Cove area

Wakeham has a wide array of architecture and buildings, including 21 houses along the main street which are grade II listed buildings. A dovecote, approximately 5 metres west-south-west of 106 Wakeham, is also Grade II Listed. Portland Museum is located within Wakeham and close to Church Ope Cove. The museum is housed in two former cottages, one titled Avice's Cottage, and both of which became grade II listed in January 1951. With both retaining thatched roofs, the cottages act as a reminder of the type of cottage that once appeared all across the island. Avice's Cottage was an inspiration within the novel The Well-Beloved, written by Thomas Hardy, as the home of three generations of "Avice's" – the novel's heroines.

=== Church Ope Cove ===
Although not quite a part of Wakeham, near to Portland Museum, and above Church Ope Cove is Rufus Castle – a ruined castle dating from the late 15th century, on the site of an earlier building. It has been grade I listed since January 1951, and is a scheduled monument. St Andrew's Church sits between the castle and the cove. It has been grade II* listed since the same time as the castle. Pennsylvania Castle is found just on the edge of Wakeham, near Church Ope Cove. The castle and its attached walls has been grade II listed since January 1951. The gatehouse and lodges to the castle were also made grade II listed at the same time, although the lodges are now separated in ownership from the castle.
