= Rufus Castle =

Grade I listed castle in Dorset, England

Coordinates: 50.5385°N 2.4294°W

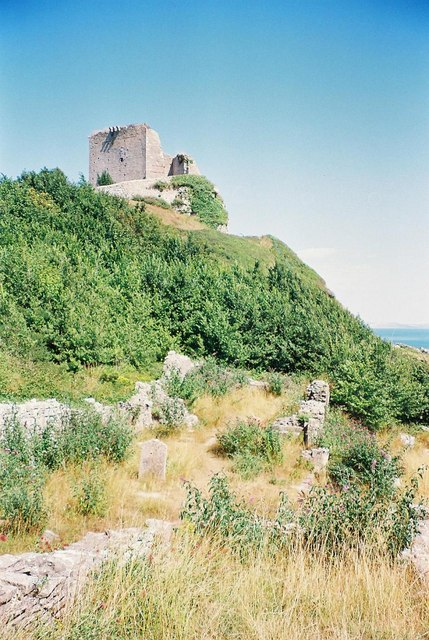
Rufus Castle and the ruins of St. Andrew's church.

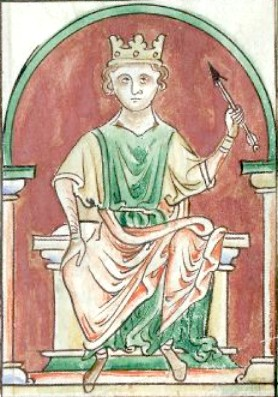
William Rufus, son of William the Conqueror

Rufus Castle, also known as Bow and Arrow Castle, is a partially ruined Blockhouse overlooking Church Ope Cove on Portland, England. The names "Rufus Castle" and "Bow and Arrow Castle" have been widely used since the late 18th Century. It was originally speculated that Rufus referred to King William II, known as William Rufus, however more recent assessments also identify Gilbert de Clare, 7th Earl of Gloucester (the Red Earl) as a possible origin for the name.

The existing structure dates largely from the late 15th century, making it Portland's oldest surviving defensive structure. Built on a pinnacle of rock, some of the original structure has been lost to erosion and collapse over the years.

The remaining castle appears to have been the keep of a stronghold, the foundation of which was much above the top of the church tower of St Andrews which lay in the valley below. The pentagonal tower of the castle has late Medieval gun holes but rests on an earlier foundation to the north and stepped plinth to the west which may have been a 12th-century keep. Remains include parts of the keep, sections of wall with gun ports and a 19th-century round-arched bridge across Church Ope Road.

The structure, including its bridge, has been a Grade I listed building since January 1951. It is one of three buildings on Portland to be Grade I listed. In addition to this, it has become a scheduled monument under the Ancient Monuments and Archaeological Areas Act 1979.

Rufus Castle looks out over the Shambles sandbank, approximately 3 miles (5 km) out to sea, one of the most feared navigational hazards in the area. It was here in 1805 that the East Indianman, the Earl of Abergavenny, foundered and eventually sank, killing 263. Among the dead was the captain of the ship, John Wordsworth, brother of the Romantic poet William Wordsworth. The poet immortalised the catastrophe and death of his brother in his poem: To the Daisy.

It was beyond the Shambles that the Battle of Portland took place in 1653 between the English navy led by General at Sea Robert Blake fighting the Dutch Navy led by Lieutenant-Admiral Maarten Tromp.

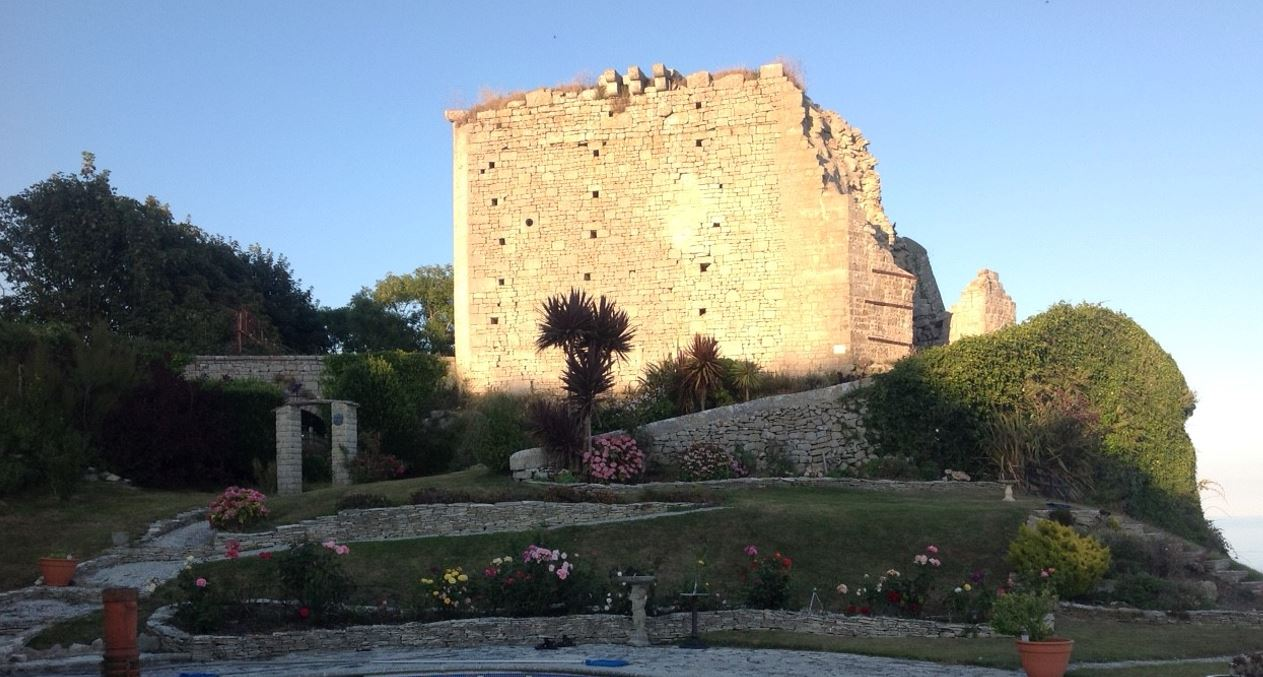
View of Rufus Castle from the west

There is no public access to the castle as it is privately owned, though it can be seen well from public footpaths along the coast.

== History ==
The Castle, as seen today, is probably the second built on the Island. In ancient times for defence against attack, taxes were raised on the island to construct Portland's first castle. Rufus Castle was reportedly built for William II, although the structure seen standing in ruins today is not of that date. In 1142, Robert, Earl of Gloucester, had captured the castle from King Stephen on behalf of Empress Maud. It had additional fortifications added in 1238 by Richard de Clare who owned it at that time. Around 1256, Aylmer de Lusignan obtained a licence to crenellate the 'insulam de Portand' and Robert, Earl of Gloucester, was granted a similar licence just 14 months later. There are no further mentions of this earlier castle or where it may have been. It is generally presumed that Rufus castle is the site of any work that may have resulted from these licences and any remains that may date from the period exist only at the foundation level or have been lost to cliff erosion.

The castle was rebuilt between 1432 and 1460, by Richard, Duke of York, and much of what remains today dates from this time. The politician and writer John Penn built the adjacent Pennsylvania Castle, a Gothic Revival mansion overlooking Church Ope Cove, between 1797 and 1800. Penn's new estate encompassed both Rufus Castle and that of the former parish church of St Andrews. At this time Penn made alterations to Rufus Castle to transform it into a picturesque folly. He erected a bridge over the lane leading to Church Ope and formed two new large openings in the walls of the castle, with a rounded arch to the North Elevation and Tudor pointed arch to the South which replaced the original door to the structure . In 1989, the castle's seaward arch collapsed. By the end of the century, English Heritage had proposed a restoration to preserve the castle.

== Virtual 3-D tour of the castle ==
A full 3-D virtual tour of Rufus Castle was launched in early 2022 by Portland museum. It won funding for the project from Art Fund, the national charity for Art. The tour is accessible free of charge on the museum's Web site and includes a historical tour provided by Gordon Le Pard, retired Dorset County Archaeologist.

== In culture ==
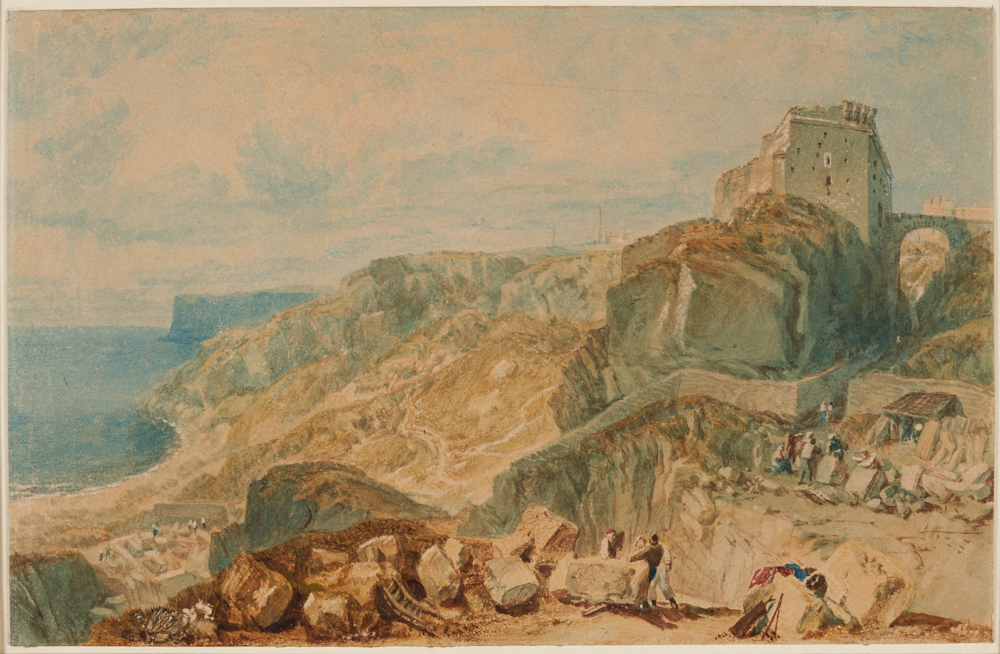
Rufus (Bow and Arrow) Castle by JMW Turner. Illustration courtesy of Victoria Gallery & Museum, University of Liverpool.

Rufus Castle was painted by English landscape artist J. M. W. Turner. In a rare revision, Turner drew the arch twice, the upper version giving it rather more prominence than in reality. The painting is now held by Victoria Gallery & Museum, University of Liverpool. Rufus Castle also featured as 'Red King's Castle' in Thomas Hardy's novel, The Well-Beloved, which was set in Portland. Hardy's name for the castle derived from William II, also known as William the Red, for whom the castle is thought to have been built. This part of the Portland coast, down to Cheyne and beyond to Portland Bill was the setting of the early chapters of Victor Hugo's novel The Man Who Laughs. More recently, the castle and the house which lies on the same grounds was the home of Harvey Gillot, a fictional English arms dealer, in Gerald Seymour's esteemed thriller, The Dealer and the Dead.

== Recent restoration ==
Extensive restoration and consolidation work was carried out to Rufus Castle in 2010–2012 on behalf of English Heritage, under their scheme of repair and urgent works. The castle had been listed on the Heritage at Risk Register in 2010. Circa mid-2008, the castle was listed as being ruinous and in need of conservation repair and consolidation.

Work began in 2010 by historic building and church architect Russ Palmer of Honiton, Devon. With the aid of the English Heritage grant, the project first involved the investigation of the condition of the castle and the implementation of the first stage of recommended repairs. Extensive repairs were needed, initially to the north walls. Palmer produced a specification for the work and after competitive tenders were obtained, work was carried out between May and October 2010 for a cost of £150,000. The work included the consolidation of the top of the walls and the exposed core at a low level, grouting voids between the core and the face of the wall, and repointing. The work was finished by November 2010.

== Castle design ==
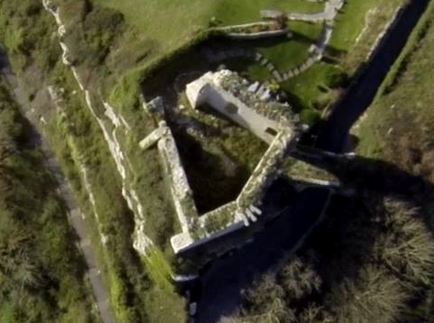
Aerial view of Rufus Castle showing the five walls

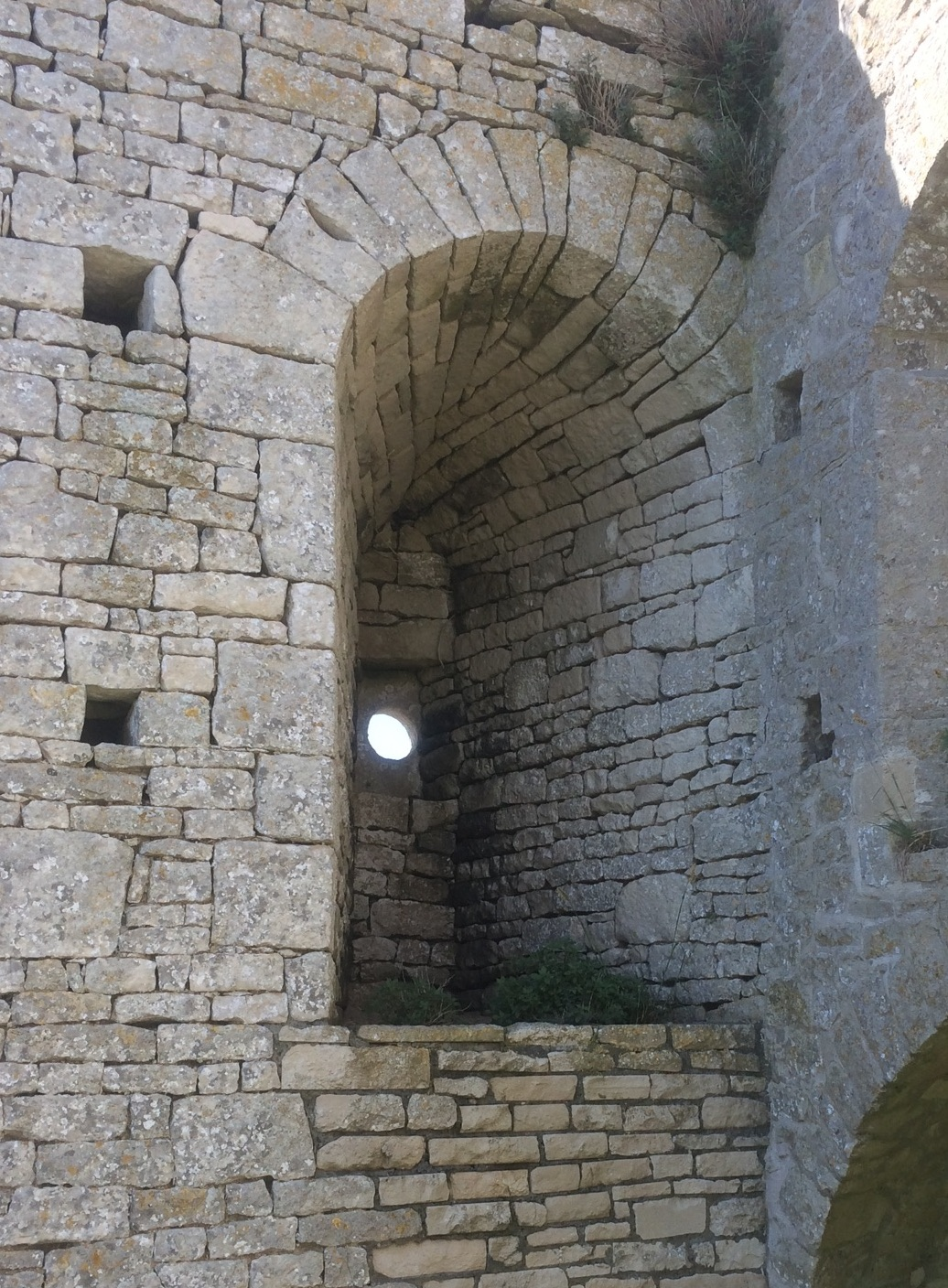
Interior detail in Rufus Castle, Portland, showing circular gun port.

The castle, constructed in the form of a pentagon, has 7-foot-thick (2 m) walls to the landward elevations pierced by numerous medieval gun ports. These are often mistakenly referred to as arrow loops. They have also given the castle an alternative name; "Bow and Arrow" Castle. It is built with Portland stone, with the walls roughly built of native ashlar. Rufus Castle features walls of roughly squared rubble and no roof. Three of the sides of the castle are considerably longer than the others.

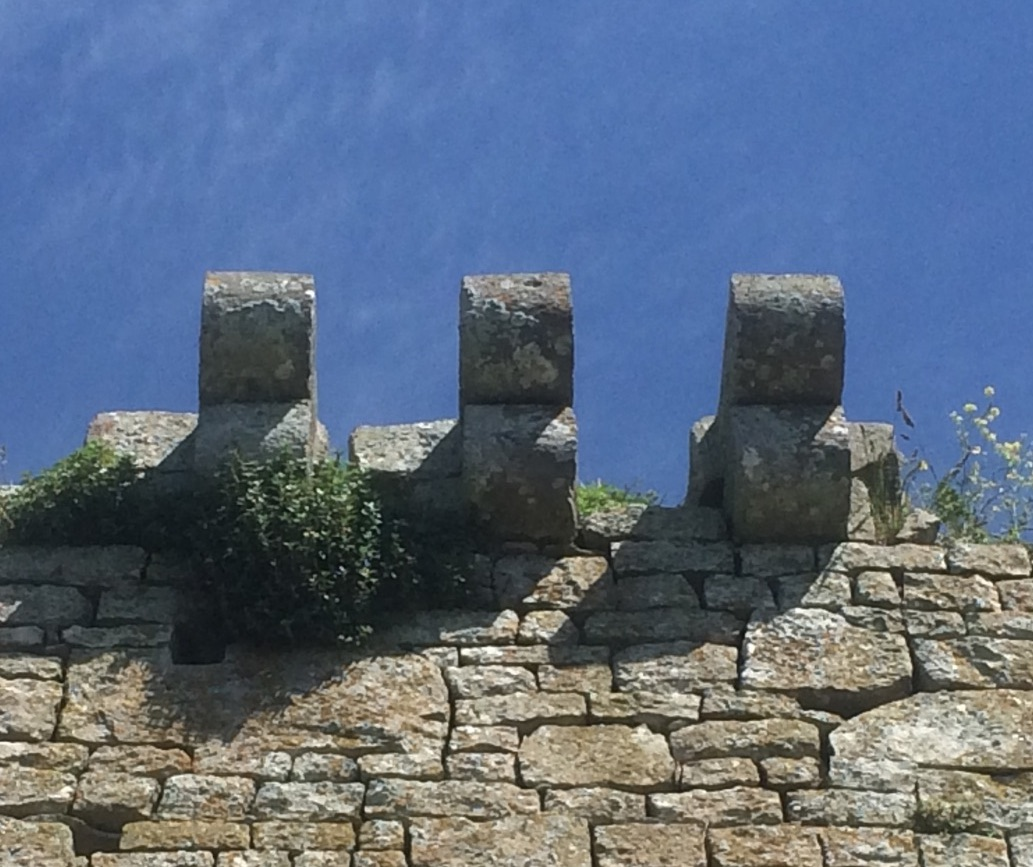
Stone corbels on Rufus Castle

In the north and west walls, at first-floor level, are five embrasures, with circular gunports, to these elevations also are stone corbels in groups of three, these supported a sectional projecting stone parapet. Outside the south gateway are the remains of stone footings. There are no longer any trace remains of the "steppes of stone" that were referred to in Gorse's Antiquities and Coker's Dorset; the steps connected the castle and the old church of St Andrew.

== See also ==
- Castles in Great Britain and Ireland
- List of castles in England
