= Pennsylvania Castle =

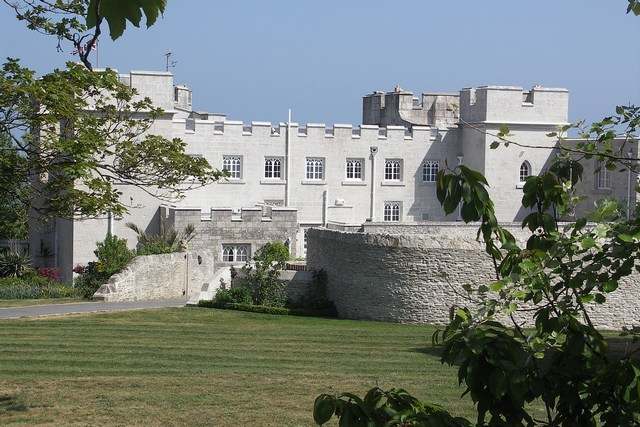
- Interactive map of the Pennsylvania Castle area

General information
- Type: English country house
- Architectural style: Gothic Revival
- Location: Isle of Portland, Dorset, England
- Coordinates: 50.538514°N 2.430482°W
- Construction started: 1797
- Completed: 1800
- Client: John Penn

Design and construction
- Architect: James Wyatt

Pennsylvania Castle is a Gothic Revival mansion on the Isle of Portland, Dorset, England. It is located in Wakeham and overlooks Church Ope Cove. The castle is Grade II Listed, as is the adjacent gatehouse and lodges, which are now in separate ownership.

After becoming a hotel in 1950, the castle reverted to being a private residence in the 1990s. It is now hired out for functions and events, and is Portland's most expensive residential property. The castle, built of Portland stone, was originally a rectangular block until it was extended in the 20th century. It also has projecting corner turrets, embattled parapets and a circular tower.

== History ==
The castle was built in 1797-1800 to designs by the architect James Wyatt for John Penn, Governor of Portland and grandson of William Penn, the founder of Pennsylvania. Penn discovered the area on one of his trips with King George III, and subsequently chose it for a marine mansion. King George III's daughter Princess Elizabeth officially opened the mansion in 1800.

A few years later, Penn had a bath built below the gardens of the castle, during a time when sea bathing was popular. However, when it was completed, Portland's Court Leet demanded rent for its use as it was built on common land. Penn refused to pay and the bath was abandoned. The castle later appeared as "Sylvania Castle" in Hardy's 1892 novel The Well-Beloved. During World War II, Winston Churchill, General Eisenhower and General de Gaulle visited the castle, where they met to finalise their plans for the Normandy landings.

In 1950, the private residence was turned into a hotel, known as "The Pennsylvania Castle Hotel", which continued to operate into the 1990s. The mansion then reverted to a private house and was sold again in 2011 for £4 million to a buyer from Australia. The castle was then made available as a holiday home, also catering for weddings, private and corporate functions and other events.
