= St Andrew's Church, Portland =

Church in Dorset, England

Coordinates: 50.5390°N 2.4292°W

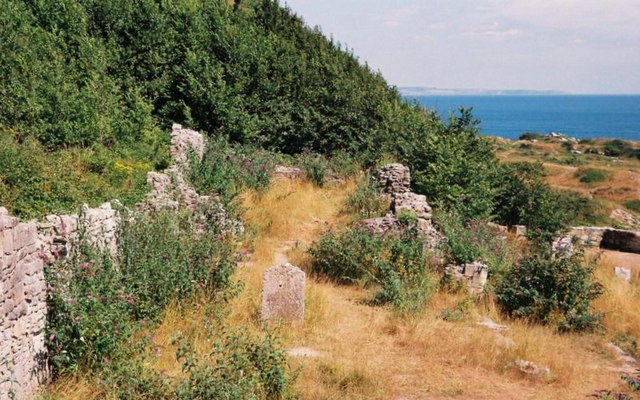
The ruins of St. Andrew's Church in 1995.

St Andrew's Church is a ruined church located above Church Ope Cove on the Isle of Portland, Dorset, England. St Andrew's was Portland's first parish church and remained as such until the mid-18th century. It is now one of the island's prime historical sites, and is a Grade II* Listed Building and a Scheduled Monument. The southern retaining wall of the churchyard is also Grade II Listed, as are three remaining churchyard monuments, approximately 7 metres south of the church.

== History ==
It is believed that the site was once occupied by a Saxon church. Later, Edward the Confessor bestowed Portland to the Benedictine Monks of St. Swithin of Winchester in 1042, who in turn built a new church over the old Saxon foundations in 1100. In 1340 and 1404, French raiders landed at Church Ope Cove and torched St. Andrews, but both times the church was rebuilt.

Around 1470–1475 a tower was added and the church was dedicated to St. Andrew. In 1625 a wall was built to shore up the land after a landslip had damaged the church, and threatened the collapse of half the cemetery. Another major landslip in 1665 caused further damage. The church was replaced by St George's Church, built at Reforne between 1754 and 1766, following the Great Southwell Landslip of 1734–35.

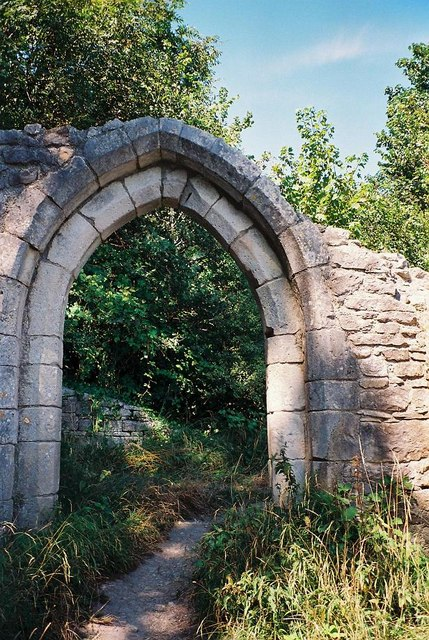
The archway of the detached bell tower in 1996.

The church site, which was first excavated by J. Merrick Head in 1898, suffered some bomb damage during World War II. The church ruins were tidied and consolidated by the Portland Field Research Group in 1968–1973, with further conservation and excavation works in 1978–1982. Today, the barest ruins now remain of the church, while some stones are preserved in the garden of Portland Museum; they were moved there by volunteers in 1979 and 1980.

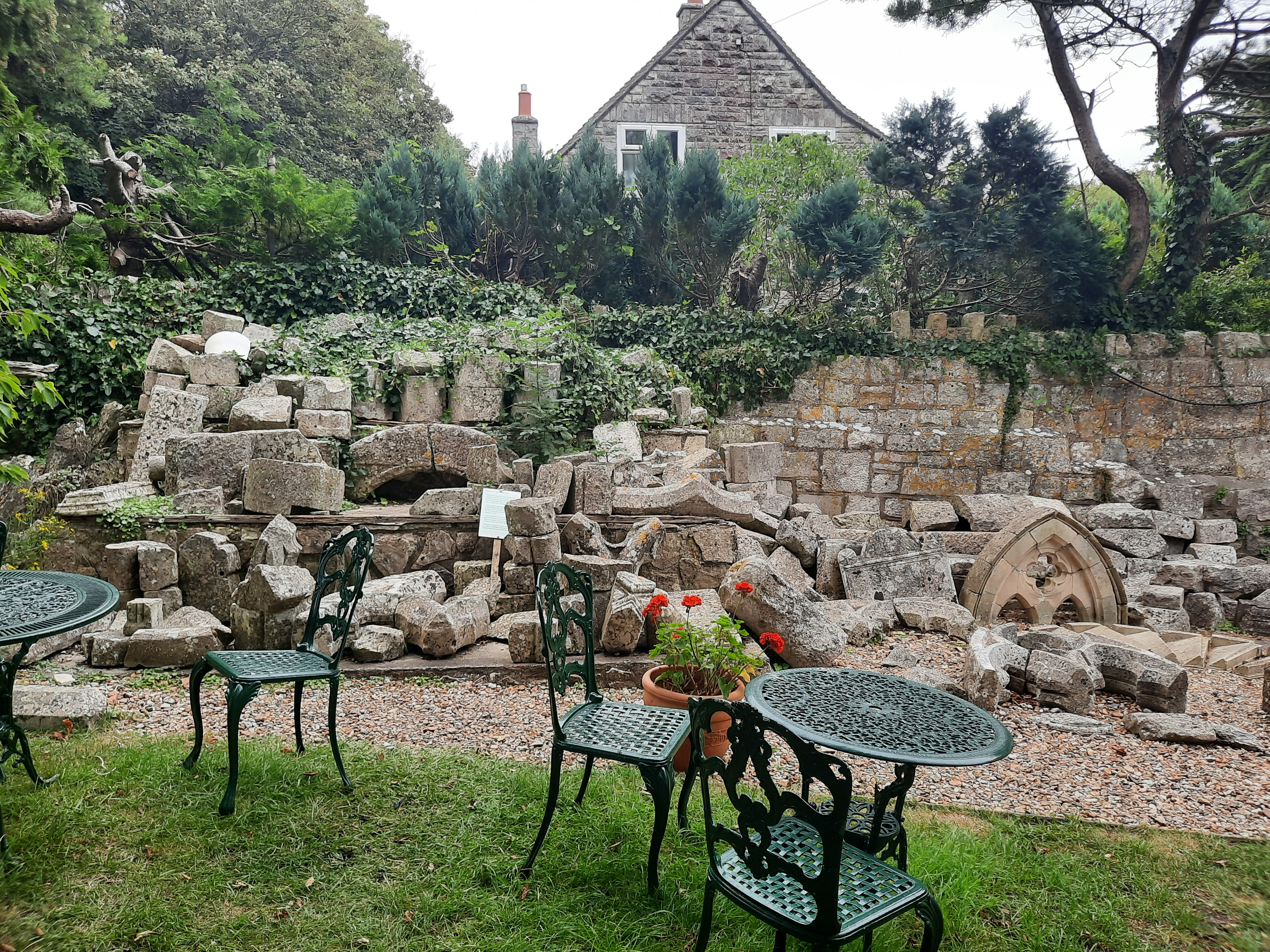
Stones from St Andrew's Church that are preserved at the Portland Museum. Photographed in 2023.
