= Pink Pippos of Portland =

2002 children's storybook by Sandra Fretwell

The Pink Pippos of Portland is a 2002 British children's storybook written by Sandra Fretwell. The book was adapted for the stage by Sandra’s daughter, Sophie Fretwell in 2020, and performed at the Royal Manor Theatre, Fortuneswell in July 2021, before going on tour from August to October 2022.

== Plot ==
The eponymous Pink Pippos are fictional pink, hippo-like mammals, closely related to their cousins, the African hippos. They live under the waters of Lyme Bay, Dorset, United Kingdom, where they contribute to the world-famous Chesil Beach, which extends from West-Bay to Portland Harbour. The beach forms part of the Jurassic Coast, a World Heritage Site.

A particular feature of the beach is the unusual natural phenomenon, pertaining to the carefully graded size of the pebbles from which it is composed. These pebbles are no bigger than shingle at the West Bay end, and gradually increase in size to that of a baked-potato, at its Southernmost end, on the Isle of Portland.

This grading is commonly attributed to longshore drift, but is in fact a result of the diligent labours of the Pippos. Living in "pods" of three or more, along its length, they work nocturnally to grade the pebbles, and thus maintain the integrity of the beach. Without their efforts there would most certainly be extensive flooding through the beach, leading to the Isle of Portland being cut off from the mainland.

== Reception ==
The book was distributed "among every nursery, infant and primary school" in Devon according to Dorset Echo. Bridport News said the book had become "a favourite" in the region. A sequel was released in 2012.
