= Portland Museum, Dorset =

Museum in England

Coordinates: 50.541°N 2.430°W

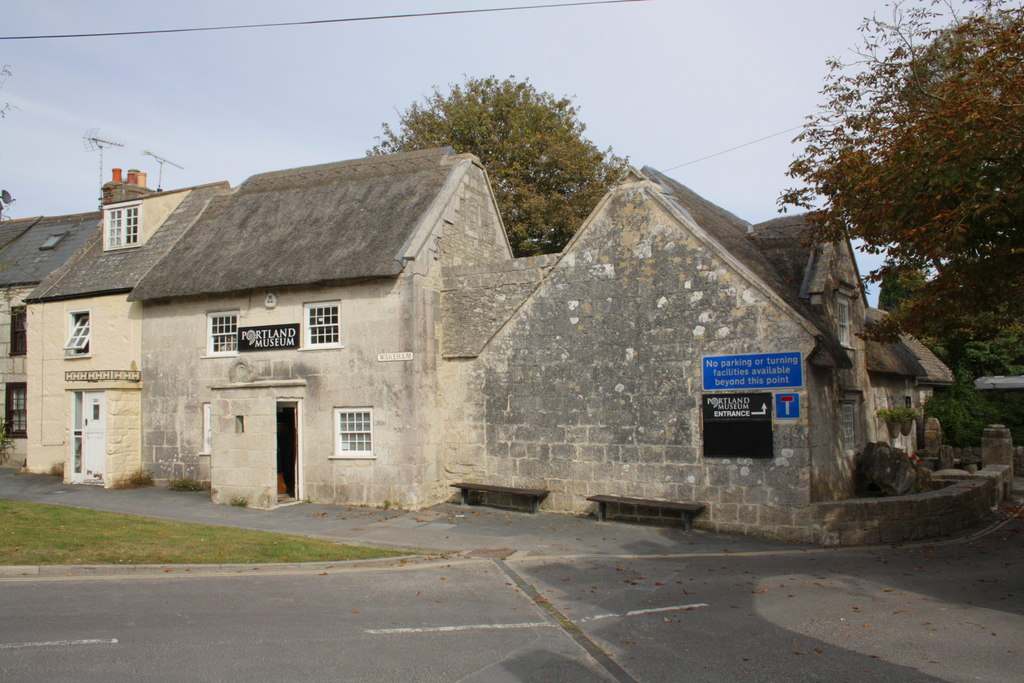
Portland Museum.

Portland Museum is a museum on the Isle of Portland in Dorset, southern England. It is located at the southern end of the hamlet of Wakeham. The museum is housed in two 17th-century thatched cottages, which have both been Grade II Listed since 1951. One of the museum's cottages, Avice's Cottage, is featured in Thomas Hardy's 1897 novel The Well-Beloved, as the home of three generations of "Avices" – the novel's heroines.

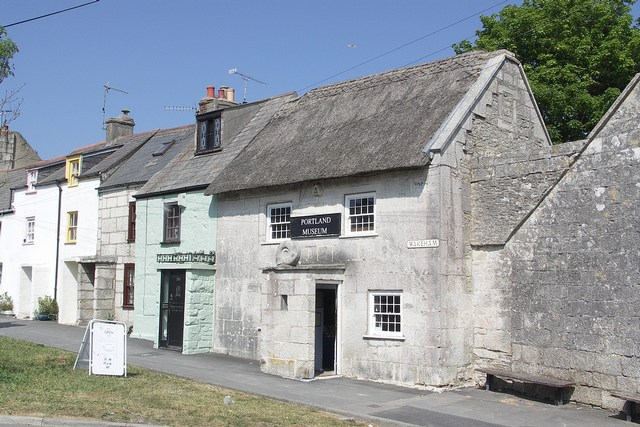
Avice's Cottage.

Portland Museum was founded by Marie Stopes, who purchased the museum's two cottages, then derelict, in 1929. She then donated them to Portland as a museum which opened in 1930. Stopes was the first honorary curator and continued her association with the museum until her death in 1958.

== Features ==
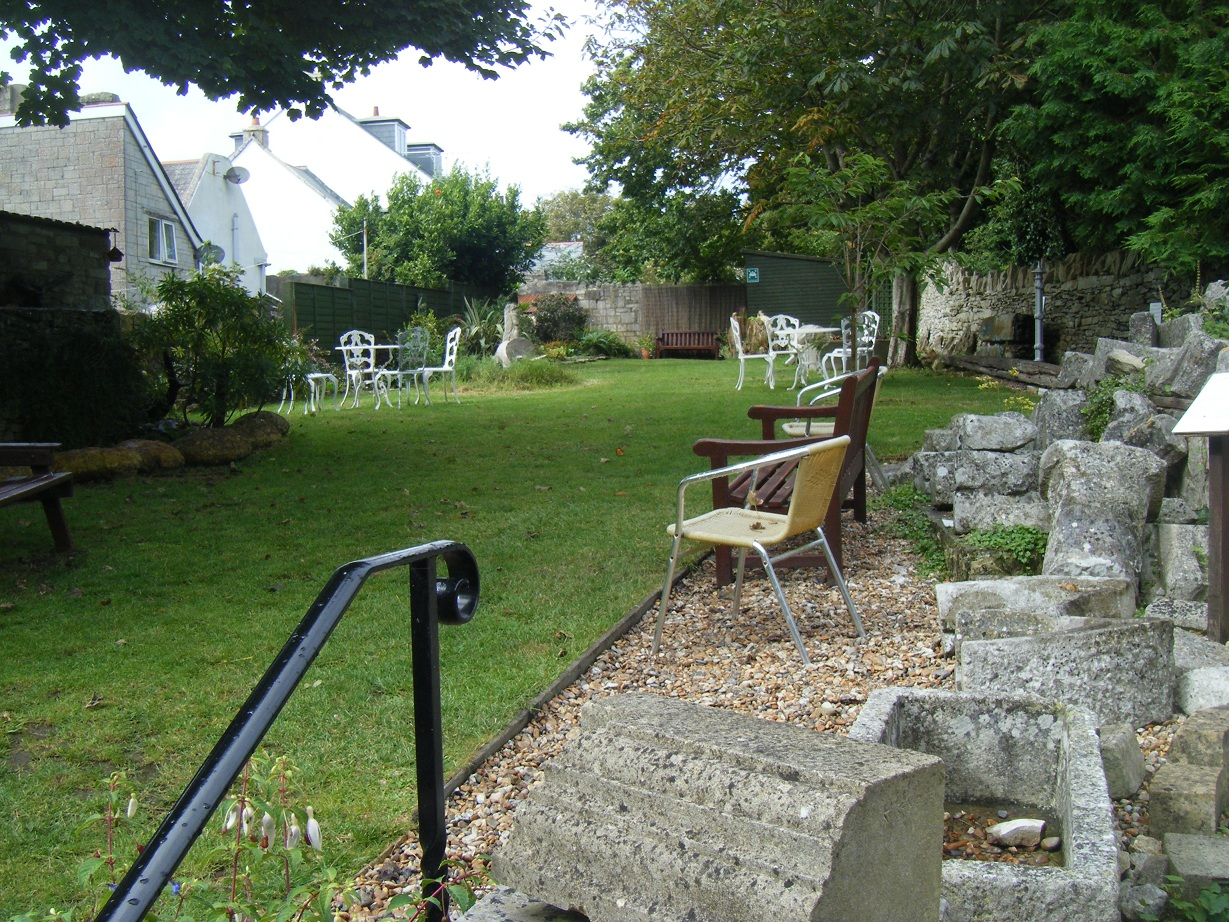
The garden area of Portland Museum.

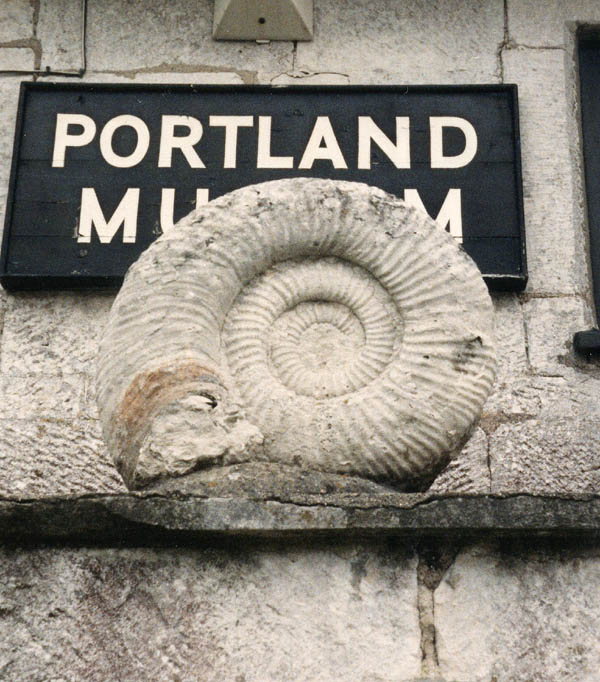
A large ammonite, 0.6 metres (2 feet) across, outside Portland Museum.

The museum has four distinct themes; the history of Portland stone, the Jurassic Coast, shipwrecks around Portland's coast and famous people linked with the island. It also displays examples of the island's archaeology from the Stone Ages onwards. The Marie Stopes Cottage features a small exhibition about Stopes and a display of items connected to Hardy. A "Victorian Corner" displays the wedding dress of a local girl and objects that would have been found in a Victorian parlour. The top-floor of the cottage contains the Maritime Room. The garden has a collection of local fossils and artifacts, including the casing of a World War II bomb found on Portland in 1995.

The management of Portland Museum was transferred from Weymouth and Portland Borough Council to the newly formed Portland Museum Trust on 1 April 2008. The trust, a registered charity, continues to operate the museum. In 2012 the Portland Island Museum Supporters group was established.

== See also ==
- Jurassica, a proposed theme park on Portland
- Grove Prison Museum, a museum based on the active HM Prison Portland
