= The Well-Beloved =

1892 novel by Thomas Hardy

- First edition of the novel
- Author: Thomas Hardy
- Language: English
- Genre: Novel
- Publisher: Osgood, McIlvaine & Co
- Publication date: 15 October 1897
- Publication place: England

The Well-Beloved: A Sketch of a Temperament is a novel by Thomas Hardy. It spans forty years, and follows Jocelyn Pierston, a celebrated sculptor who attempts to create in stone the image of his ideal woman, while he tries also to find her in the flesh.

It was serialized in 1892, and published as a book in 1897.

== Plot summary ==
The novel revolves around Jocelyn Pierston, a sculptor on the Isle of Slingers, and his relationships with three generations of the Caro family.

In the first part, a 20-year–old Jocelyn Pierston arrives from London to the Isle of Slingers. It is established that he is looking for the 'Well-Beloved', an intangible form of feminine beauty that seems to 'manifest' itself in various women. He believes that the concept is present in Avice Caro, a childhood friend of Pierston. The two begin a romance, and Avice's innocence and purity is highlighted. He shortly after encounters Miss Marcia Bencomb, however, and comes to believe that the Well-Beloved has settled within her. He proposes marriage to Marcia, rejecting Avice. Mr Bencomb, however, forbids the marriage, taking Marcia abroad, while Avice marries her cousin.

The second part follows Jocelyn who, at the age of 40, is a well-respected and wealthy sculptor. He returns to the Isle of Slingers after hearing of the death of Avice, where he encounters her daughter, Ann, working as a laundress. Jocelyn quickly becomes infatuated, calling her 'Avice' and believing that she is a reincarnation of her mother. He proposes but Ann refuses, explaining that she is already married to Isaac Pierston. She gives birth to a daughter, who she names 'Avice'.

In the final part Jocelyn is 60. He receives word of Isaac Pierston's death, and returns to the island to ask Ann to marry him; however, upon seeing her daughter (the granddaughter of the original Avice Caro) he falls in love with her, believing that the 'Well-Beloved' has incarnated within her. Jocelyn pays court to her but only at night, so his features are obscured; when Avice realises he is an old man, she is repulsed. Jocelyn proposes, only for Avice to elope the same night; Ann Caro dies of shock. Ultimately, Jocelyn Pierston enters a platonic marriage with Marcia Bencomb.

== Background ==
The main setting of the novel, the Isle of Slingers, is based on the Isle of Portland in Dorset, southern England.

Many of Hardy's novels were set in Dorset. The Well Beloved is one of Hardy's last novels. It was first published in three-part serial form in 1892, and then revised and re-published as a book in 1897, after Hardy's last novel Jude the Obscure (1895). The novel tells the story of the sculptor Jocelyn Pierston's search for the ideal woman, through three generations of a Portland family.

A cottage housing what is now part of Portland Museum, on the Isle of Portland, founded by Marie Stopes, a friend of Hardy and his wife, was an inspiration for the book. The cottage acted as the home of Avice, the novel's heroine.

== Themes ==
The frequent time skips within the novel are mirrored by the sense of vast geological time, which is heightened by the description of the stone of the Isle of Slingers which makes up the novel's opening chapter. It is Pierston's inability to settle in a relationship with any individual member of the Caro family that makes him a transient figure 'outside' time. His refusal to participate in the "cycle of generations" implied by the geological history of the stones makes him a disruptive, temporarily disturbed presence.
