= Chiswell Walled Garden =

Community garden in Dorset, England

Coordinates: 50.5614°N 2.4485°W

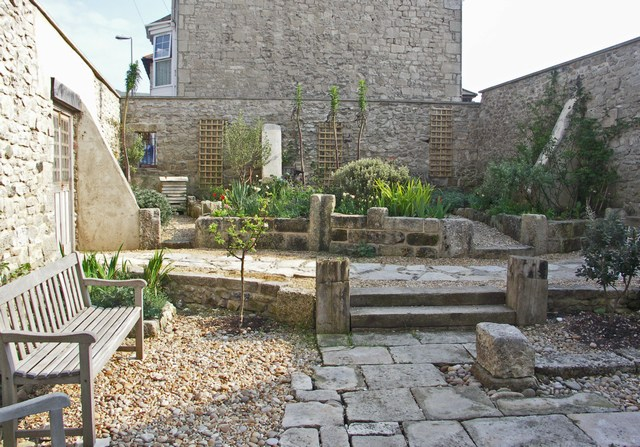
Chiswell Walled Garden

Chiswell Walled Garden is a community walled garden, located on the Isle of Portland, Dorset, England. It is found in the village of Chiswell, close to Chesil Beach, within the remaining ruins of an old stone cottage. The garden was created between 2001-06 by the Chiswell Community Trust, with funding from Countryside Agency under their Doorstep Green Initiative. It is maintained by volunteer members of the trust and is open to the public.

== History ==
Chiswell Walled Garden was created out of a perceived lack of green space within Chiswell village. The old village common was transformed into a housing estate in 2001, prompting local residents to seek an alternative site. With the help of the Doorstep Green advisors, the Chiswell Community Trust obtained a lease on a derelict walled compound near Chesil Cove.

The launching of the Countryside Agency's Doorstep Green Initiative in 2001 saw 25 projects commissioned in the South West, including the creation of Chiswell Walled Garden. Additional funding was received from the Local Heritage Initiative, Living Spaces, Awards for All and Breathing Places, while gifts were received from the South West Regional Development Agency, Batten's Solicitors, the NCCPG and many of the trust volunteers who were involved with the project.

The walled garden project was reported to be one of the smallest and most difficult of the South West's community greens. Since completion, the Chiswell Community Trust have received a Green Pennant award for both the nearby Chiswell Earthworks and the Walled Garden – an award for the best community-run parks in the country.
