= The Cove House Inn =

Public house in Dorset, England

Coordinates: 50.5606°N 2.4486°W

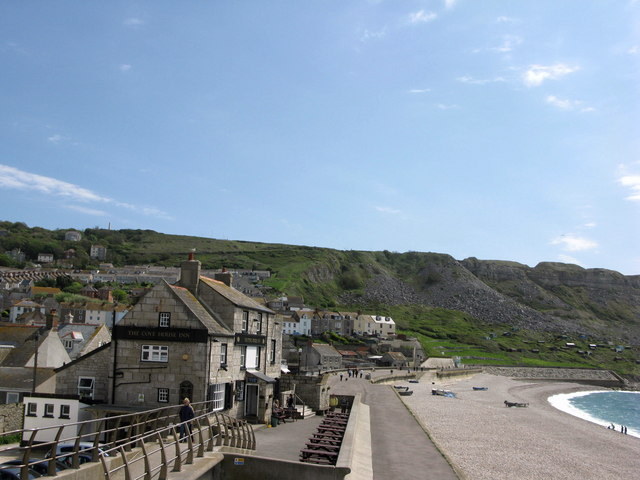
The Cove House Inn, in 2009.

The Cove House Inn is a 19th-century public house on the Isle of Portland, Dorset, England. It is situated within the village of Chiswell, and alongside Chesil Beach on the esplanade. The Cove House Inn remains one of Portland's most popular pubs, and has been reputed to be one of the best inns for panoramic views in the area. The pub has been a Grade II Listed Building since May 1993.

== History ==
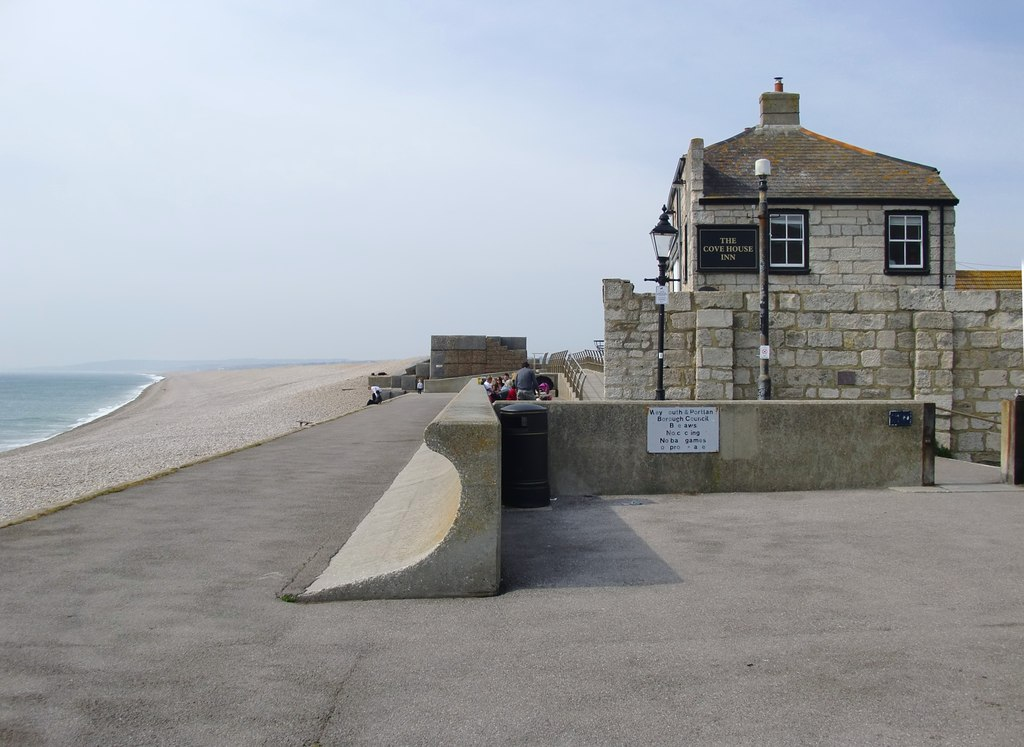
The Cove House Inn.

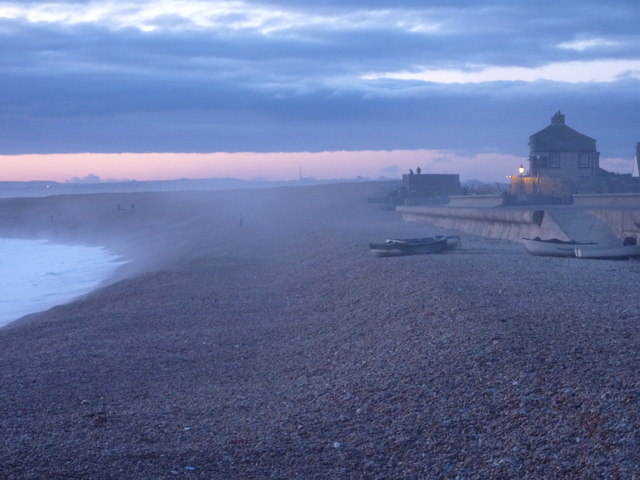
The Cove House Inn and Chesil Cove at dusk.

The current building has been recorded as being early 19th-century, although there is also evidence that the building has origins from the late 17th to the early 18th century. Despite its particularly vulnerable position on the beach, the pub was a survivor of the Great Storm of 1824. The pub's position, overlooking Chesil Cove has linked it to various involvements with shipwrecks. The pub was also a focal point for important meetings on the island.

Between 1958 and 1965, construction of a sea wall was completed, and this gave the inn and Chiswell village protection from the sea. In past storms, the sea has been recorded as smashing open the pub's door and roaring into the bar as well as throwing pebbles onto the roof. During the storms of January–February 2014, prime minister David Cameron arrived at Portland to show support for those affected by the storms. During his time on the island he visited The Cove House Inn.

== Design ==
The pub is built with large square dressed Portland stone blocks, and has slate roofs and stone stacks. The interior was modified during the 20th century; and there are substantial dressed stone walls in the basement, possibly part of an earlier building on the site. Outside of the pub is an outside seating area, overlooking Chesil Beach and the rugged cliffs of Portland peninsular. Noted in the 1975 book "Better Pubs in Dorset", the long open windows of the pub are shuttered in the winter storms for protection. Inside the building is made up of old oak furniture and pictures of wrecks. There is also some carving on the bar backing.
