= Royal Manor Theatre =

Theatre in Dorset, England

Coordinates: 50.5613°N 2.4452°W

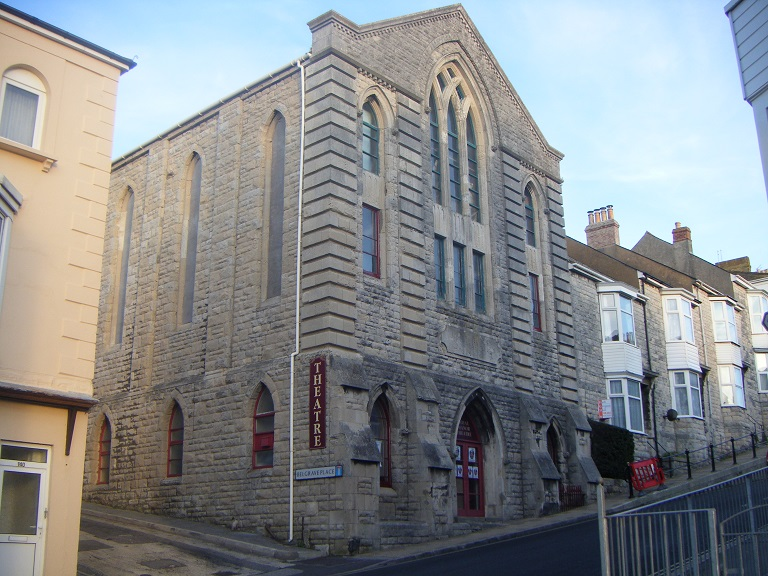
Royal Manor Theatre

Royal Manor Theatre is a theatre located in Fortuneswell, Isle of Portland, Dorset, England. Formerly a Methodist chapel, the building was later converted into the Royal Manor Theatre, which opened in 1978.

== History ==
The Royal Manor Theatre Company (RMTC) were established in 1947 as the Portland Dramatic Society (PDS), a group of local residents who wished to return live theatre to Portland after World War II. The society originally used a variety of local venues across Portland and Weymouth, and occupied the Masonic Hall at Victoria Square between 1957 and 1964. They went on to occupy the Jubilee Hall at Easton until 1970, but after the society failed to find a new home, they faced disbanding by the end of 1971.

In 1972, the society were approached by Captain and Mrs. Chibnall, who were considering purchasing the disused Primitive Methodist church of 1869 in Fortuneswell. Offering the society use of the upper floor, a lease of £25 per year was agreed between the two parties, and conversion work began in late Summer 1972. After 11,000 hours of voluntary labour and £3,500 in costs, the Royal Manor Theatre was opened in October 1978. To coincide with the theatre's opening, the society changed their name to the Royal Manor Theatre Company.

Later in 1980, Captain Chibnall decided to sell the building, prompting the theatre company to consider obtaining a bank loan to purchase it. After seeking advice from Weymouth and Portland Borough Council, an agreement was made for the council to purchase the building and then lease it to the company. Chibnall agreed to sell for £8,500, his original purchase price, plus the cost of improvements he had made. The transfer of ownership was completed in May 1980, while the Royal Manor Theatre Company later purchased the building from the council for the same price in 1982.

The theatre company's first aim is to provide live theatrical entertainment of a high standard for the local community within easy reach of their homes. Another aim is to provide and improve education in all aspects of drama. The company's intentions have been recognised by the Charity Commissioners who granted them charitable status.
