= Chesil Cove =

Massive curved slope of shingle, at Chesil Beach in Dorset, England

Coordinates: 50.5595°N 2.4482°W

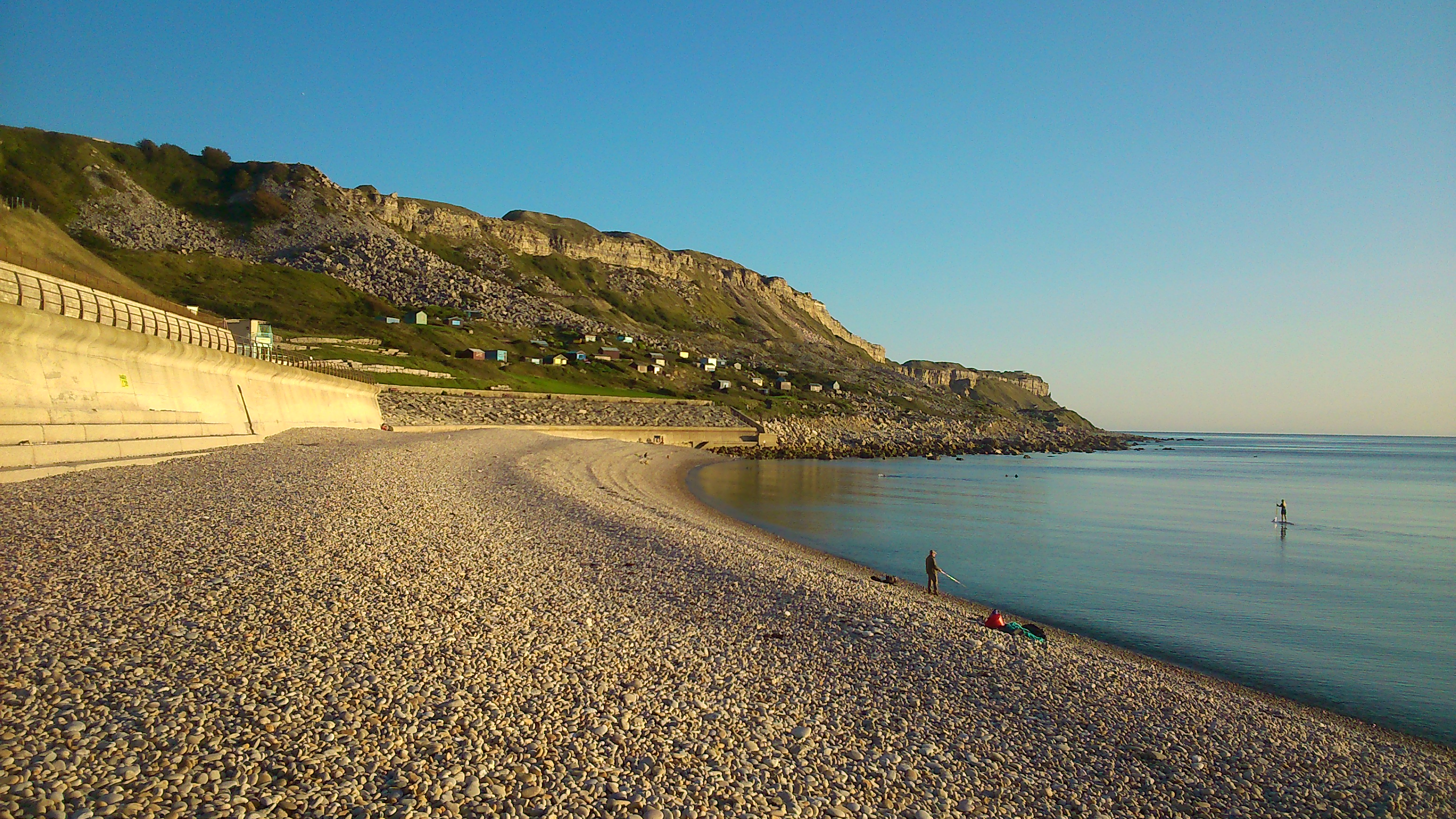
Chesil Cove at Chiswell on the Isle of Portland.

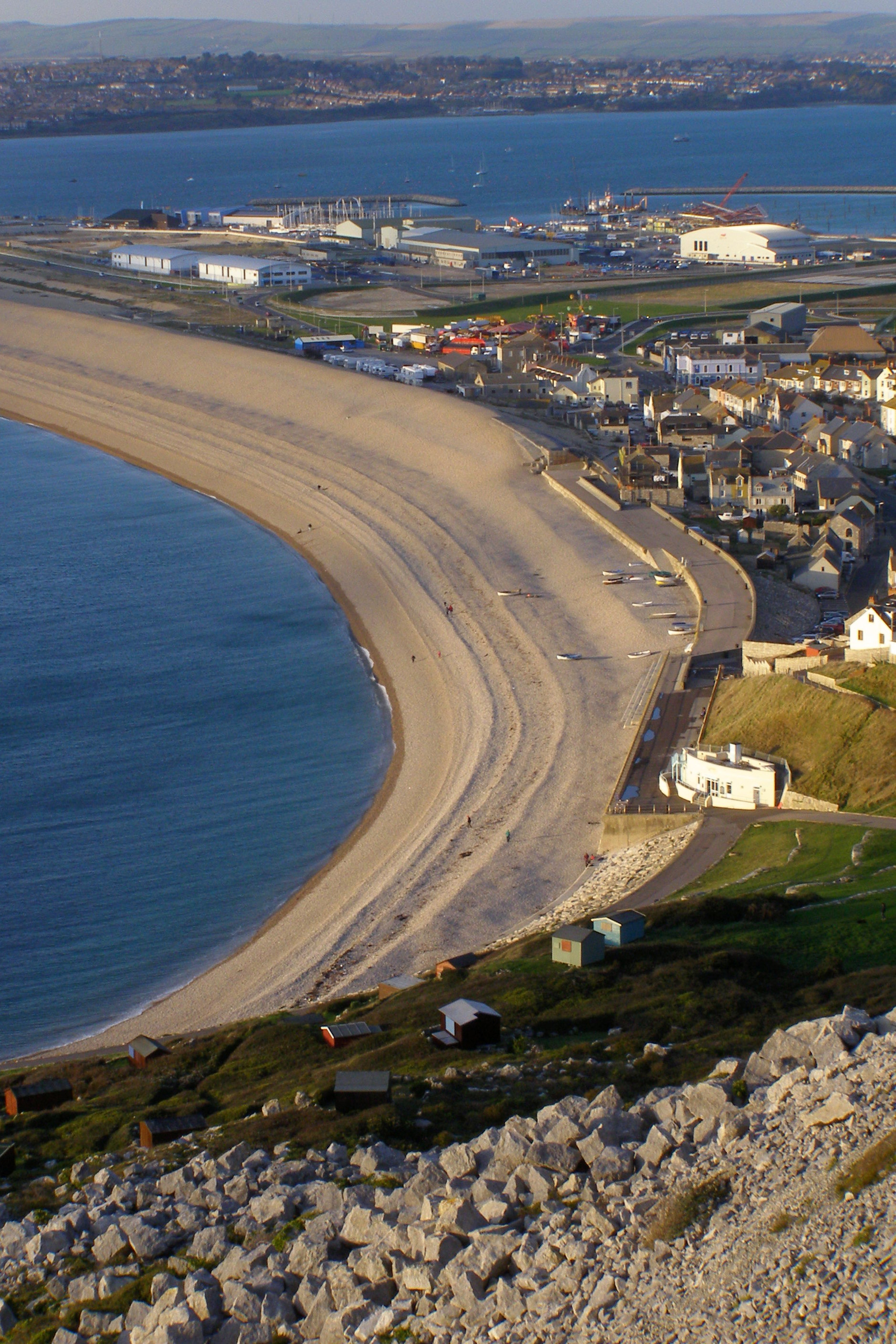
The high beach of Chesil Cove from Isle of Portland, showing Weymouth Bay across the isthmus

Chesil Cove is a curved steep bank forming the south-east end of 29-kilometre (18 mi) Chesil Beach in Dorset, England. It is thus part of one of three large shingle structures in Britain, extending from West Bay to the Isle of Portland (Portland Bill), the latter acting more firmly as a great barrier (groyne) which stops tidal action from washing the beach away and leads to the high depositions by wind and tide action forming the grand curved bank of this "cove". The "cove", bill and much of Chesil Beach give shelter from the prevailing winds and waves for much of Weymouth Bay, the town of Weymouth and the village of Chiswell. It forms part of the Jurassic Coast.

== Flooding defences ==
The adjoining village of Chiswell was established predominately as a fishing community. Despite its vulnerability to sea storms and flooding, Chiswell developed into a thriving community. One of the best-documented incidents of flooding occurred in the Great Storm of 1824. The storm saw the death of thirty residents, the destruction of eighty houses, and the damage of many others. The construction of a sea wall finally commenced in 1958, and work on this scheme continued until 1965. The wall extended from the far end of Chesil Cove, at West Weares, to the location of the village's Cove House Inn. A promenade was laid-out on top of the wall, and this became a popular attraction.

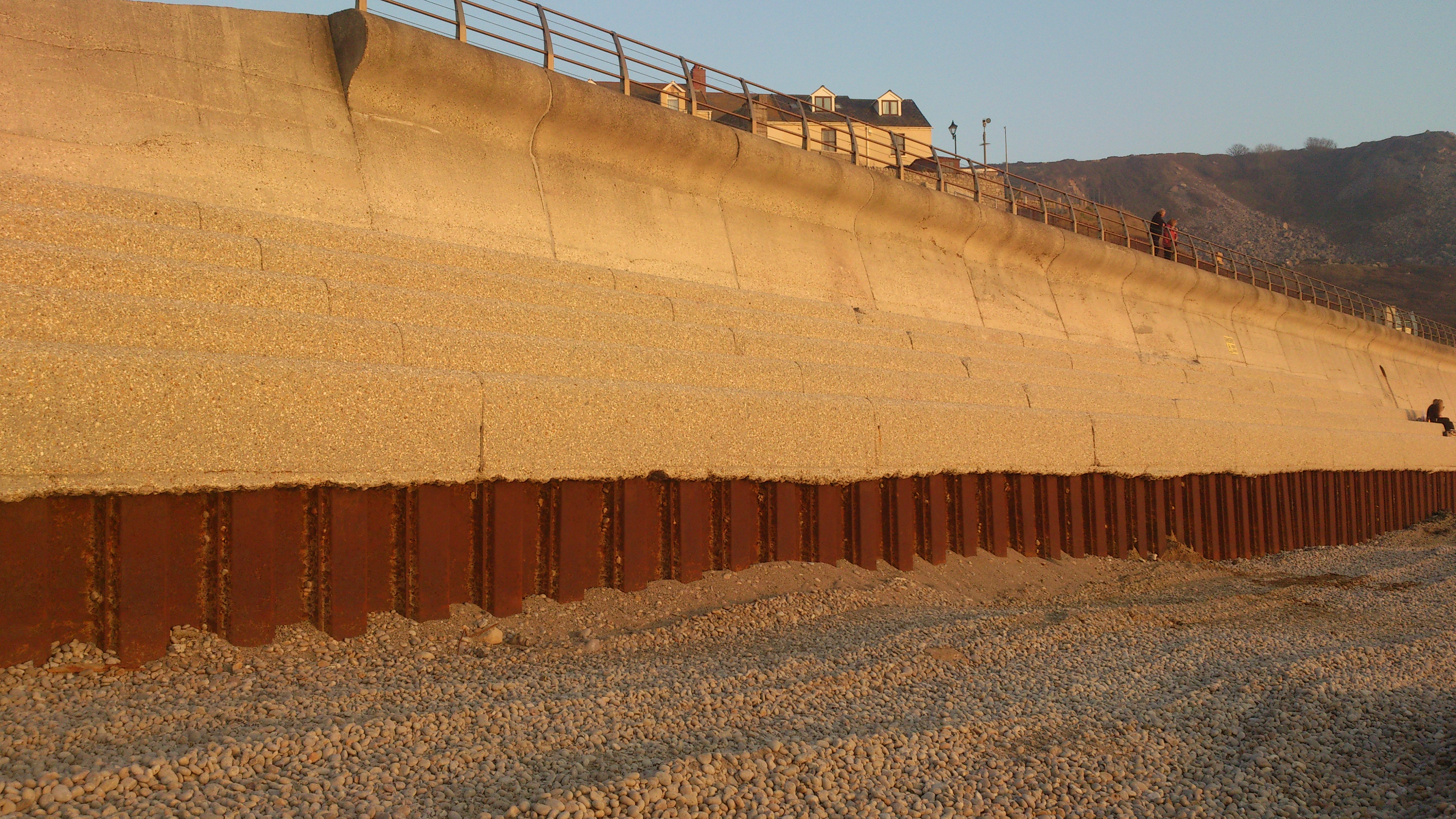
Steel and concrete flood defences visible beneath the beach at Chesil Cove.

Despite the sea wall proving a worthy defence, incidents of widespread flooding continue. During December 1978 and February 1979, two major storms caused further devastation to Chiswell. Accordingly, further defence were installed during the 1980s. During January–February 2014, violent storms across the south-west of England caused more flooding in the village.

== Recreation ==
=== Diving ===
Chesil Cove is a popular site for scuba divers. It has become one of the best known shore dives in the UK. The cove is a reasonably shallow shore dive, and has an interesting selection of south coast marine life, as well as an abundance of flora and fauna. Although there have been many shipwrecks in the cove, few significant divable remains exist close to the beach due to its exposure to strong waves.

=== Fishing ===
Through fishing, the beach provided the main occupation for the villagers of Chiswell and the rest of the islanders. The beach is still used by sea anglers and the British record for shore-captured shore rockling was set there in 1992. Recreational fishing is a popular pastime at the cove.

== Shipwrecks ==
Chesil Beach, and the cove, have seen many cases of shipwrecks, more so than most other parts of the British coast, particularly during the Age of Sail. Chesil Beach became known as "Deadman's Bay", taken after the name Thomas Hardy gave West Bay, including Chesil Cove, in his novel The Well Beloved of 1892.

The local fishermen, particularly at Portland, developed a purpose-built vessel to withstand the sea actions at Chesil Beach. The boat, known as a Lerret, is a double-ended open fishing boat, used for seine net fishing. The 18th-century public house The Cove House Inn remains one of Portland's most popular pubs and is Grade II Listed. Despite its particularly vulnerable position on the beach, the pub was a survivor of the Great Storm of 1824.

=== Shipwreck list ===
Some of the ships wrecked at Chesil Cove include:

- John - 1669 - English cargo vessel, crew and cargo saved
- Angel Guardian - 1681 - cargo vessel, 6,000 oranges recovered
- Peter - 1685 - French cargo vessel, four hogsheads of French wine saved
- De Hoop - 1749 - Dutch West Indiaman, all crew saved
- Johanna Theresa - 22 January 1753 - Dutch craft, the captain and five men drowned
- Biscaye - 1754 - Spanish cargo vessel
- Fanny - 1760 - British brigantine involved in slave trade
- Zenobie - 12 January 1762 - French privateer
- Le Pelerin - 10 August 1784 - French craft
- Nancy - 13 August 1793 - British brig, crew and part cargo saved
- Peggy - 3 June 1796 - American cargo vessel, four of eleven crew saved
- Rodney - 26 September 1799 - English brigantine vessel, all crew saved
- Hayward - 26 September 1799 - English brigantine vessel, all crew saved
- Concord - 26 September 1799 - English brigantine vessel, all crew saved
- Smith - 26 September 1799 - English brigantine vessel, all crew saved
- Endeavour - 1800 - British craft, all crew saved
- Nancy - 24 March 1801 - British craft
- Le Mercuria - 4 March 1818 - 500-ton French vessel, 20-30 drowned
- Pollux - 20 October 1820 - brig, one crew lost
- Iris - 7 November 1823 - Swedish brig, the master and three of six crew men saved
- Wasster Norland - 26 November 1824 - Swedish sailing vessel, six of ten crew men saved
- Leonora - 3 December 1824 - Dutch Galliot, all crew and cargo lost
- Haabets Anker - 11 December 1828 - Norwegian brig, all crew saved
- Atlas - 9 December 1831 - American brig, nine of eleven crew saved
- Amyntas - 30 November 1841 - English brig, master and three crew drowned
- Maria Johanna - April 1852 - Dutch galliot, four of crew of seven lost
- Amalie - 1 February 1869 - German brig
- Edwin & Sarah - 5 January 1882 - ketch
- Sapphire - 8 August 1883 - English schooner, all crew of six saved by coastguard rocket apparatus
- Christiana - 2 September 1883 - Norwegian barque, eight of crew of ten saved
- Fannie C - 3 October 1890 - schooner, beached whilst on fire, 10 saved
- Ora et Labora - 13 October 1891 - Norwegian brig
- Emma Maria - 25 October 1903 - Russian schooner
- Patria - 26 October 1903 - Norwegian barque
- Dorothea - 14 February 1914 - Dutch cargo steamship
- Preveza - 15 January 1920 - Greek vessel
- Ellida - 1920 - salvage tug
- Madeleine Tristan - 20 September 1930 - French schooner, all crew saved

== See also ==
- List of Dorset beaches
