= Chiswell Earthworks =

Land sculpture on the Isle of Portland, England

Coordinates: 50.5572°N 2.4469°W

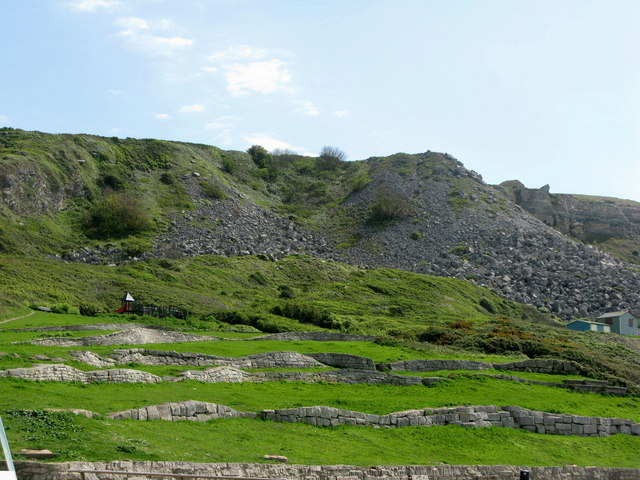
Chiswell Earthworks

Chiswell Earthworks is a land sculpture, located on the Isle of Portland, Dorset, England. It is found above Chesil Beach's most southerly part Chesil Cove, at the end of the promenade sea wall, towards West Weares. It was created by John Maine RA, between 1986 and 1993.

== History ==
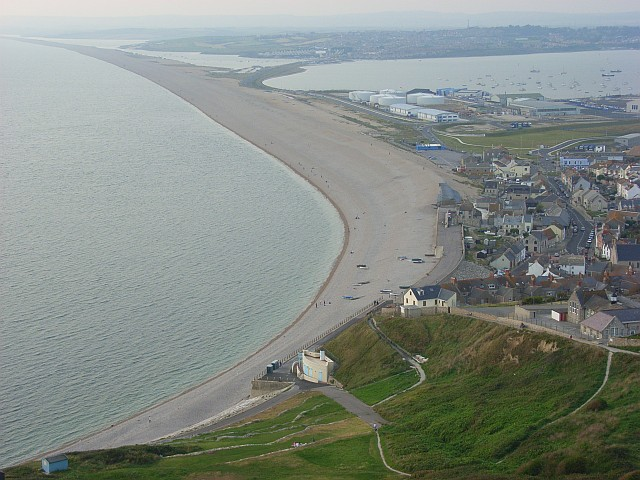
Chiswell Earthworks (bottom left) seen from Tophill

The Chiswell Earthworks land sculpture was built after a suggestion was made by Margaret Somerville, a Portland local and owner of the Chesil Gallery. The project became one of the Common Ground's New Milestone projects and was commissioned in 1986.

John Maine RA, a sculptor with international reputation, was asked to undertake the commission. Maine firstly decided on a site for the project, and ended up choosing a grassy area of hillside above the Sea Wall where Chesil Beach ends. Many local people believed that the project and sculpture would never see completion. However, an exhibition titled "Henry Moore and the Sea" was held at the Chesil Gallery in 1993 to mark the completion of the sculpture during the summer of that year. In total the sculpture took £250,000 to complete.

Since completion, the earthworks have been highly praised internationally, gathered various awards, and is often used by local people as well as for hosting various local events.
