= Ferry Bridge, Dorset =

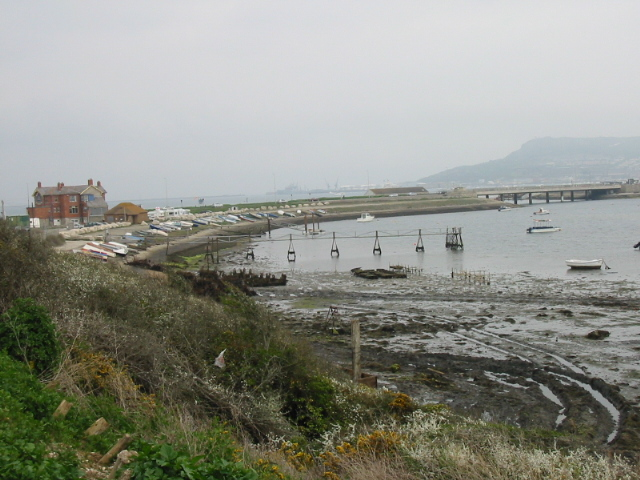
- Coordinates: 50.5830°N 2.4712°W

Location
- Interactive map of Ferry Bridge, Dorset

Ferry Bridge is at the beginning of the causeway to the Isle of Portland, Dorset, England, and is the point at which the Fleet lagoon joins Portland Harbour. It is situated several hundred metres south of Portland's boundary with the village of Wyke Regis, Weymouth. To the west of Ferry Bridge is the start of The Fleet, which is an internationally important nature reserve that extends to Abbotsbury Swannery, while to the east is Portland Harbour. Along the harbour side is Smallmouth Beach. The only road between Portland and the Mainland (the A354) passes across Ferry Bridge.

== History ==
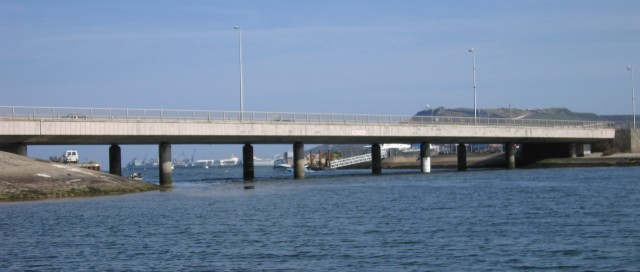
The bridge at Ferry Bridge.

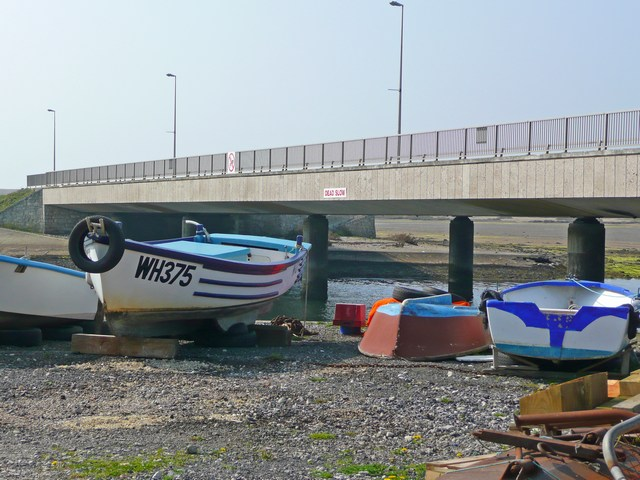
The bridge with the Fleet running under towards Portland Harbour.

Before 1839 there was no road connection between Portland and mainland England. Instead, a small ferry was used to make the treacherous crossing over Smallmouth Passage. During the Great Storm of 1824, a storm breached Chesil Beach, and caused the ferry passage to become even more dangerous than before. Since the 18th-century, petitions had called for the construction of a bridge, and the 1824 storm led to further demand.

The first bridge was built in 1839, and was maintained by the Bridge Commissioners. It made Ferry Bridge a popular tourist attraction. A second bridge was constructed between 1894 and 1896, after the Bridge Commissioners transferred the original bridge to Dorset County Council. The original bridge was in a poor state and needed replacing. By the late 20th-century, the second bridge also needed replacing, which led to the construction of the current bridge in 1985.

In 1865, the mainland railway line was extended from Weymouth to Portland. In order to get across the Smallmouth passage, a wooden viaduct was built by 1864. In 1902 a new viaduct was built of steel at Ferry Bridge. The railway closed to passengers in 1952, and goods traffic in 1965, while the viaduct was demolished in December 1971. Robert Whitehead's Torpedo Works, a factory built in 1891 to manufacture torpedoes, was once situated on the Wyke Regis side of Ferry Bridge. The factory was closed in 1997, and is now a housing estate. At Ferry Bridge is a World War II type 22 pillbox, placed along the east of the Fleet.
