= Fortuneswell =

Village in Dorset, England

Coordinates: 50°33′39″N 2°26′40″W

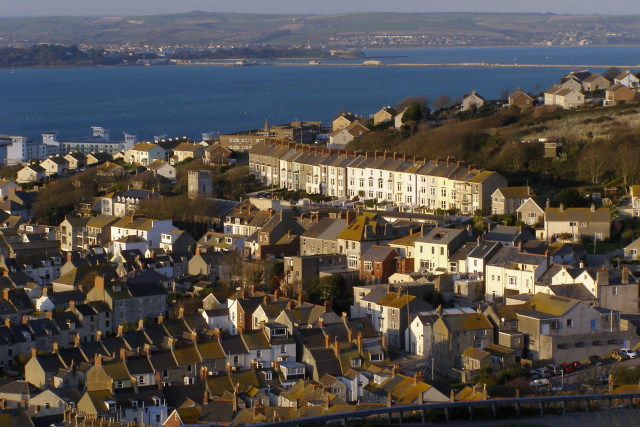
- Fortuneswell from Priory Corner

- Location within Dorset
- OS grid reference: SY689732
- Unitary authority: Dorset
- Ceremonial county: Dorset
- Region: South West
- Country: England
- Sovereign state: United Kingdom
- Post town: PORTLAND
- Postcode district: DT5
- Dialling code: 01305
- Police: Dorset
- Fire: Dorset and Wiltshire
- Ambulance: South Western

Fortuneswell is a village in Underhill on the Isle of Portland, in Dorset, England. It lies on steeply sloping land on the northern edge of the island, known as Underhill, where Chesil Beach connects the island to the mainland. Adjoining Fortuneswell are Chiswell to the west and Castletown to the north. Fortuneswell occupies the steeper land above sea level, whereas Chiswell and Castletown occupy flat land close to sea level, next to Chesil Beach and Portland Harbour respectively. Fortuneswell has a main shopping street, and along with Easton, is the main hub of the island's activities.

Fortuneswell now includes the former hamlets of Maiden Well and Mallams. As with the rest of Portland's settlements, Fortuneswell has been designated as a conservation area, to protect its special architectural and historic interest, since 1976.

== History ==
Fortuneswell was established around a natural watercourse and various springs. It is likely that the Romans developed the village pond and wells. The main well was situated within the centre of the village. The village name was first recorded as "Fortunes Well" in 1608, and evidence has suggested this originated from the belief in the occult star-telling power of its water, where one's luck could be seen. Over the centuries the village was largely made up of open space, with high-quality houses spread out across the community.

From the 1840s onwards Portland saw a large increase within its population, due to the construction of Portland Harbour's Breakwaters. The housing demands placed upon the island saw the originality of Fortuneswell altered. A large number of terraces were erected across the village area, and were crammed into any available open space. The expansion continued into the 20th century, when the site of Tillycoombe Farm became a large housing estate too. A new church was built between 1838 and 1840 at Fortuneswell, and was named St John's. In 1865, Underhill became its own parish, with St John's becoming the parish church. The influx of residents and visitors allowed Fortuneswell to flourish commercially, with many businesses becoming established there. The 1896 Kelly's Directory lists 73 businesses within the village.

Following World War II, it became clear new housing on Portland was needed, and this led to the construction of a large housing estate across Verne Common. The new estate, which began construction in 1949, was made a part of Fortuneswell. The original project suggested the construction of high-quality villas, however, prefabricated buildings were erected instead. With the closure of the naval base in 1995, Fortuneswell has since seen some economic decline in business, although various independent stores remain active.

== Commerce and amenities ==
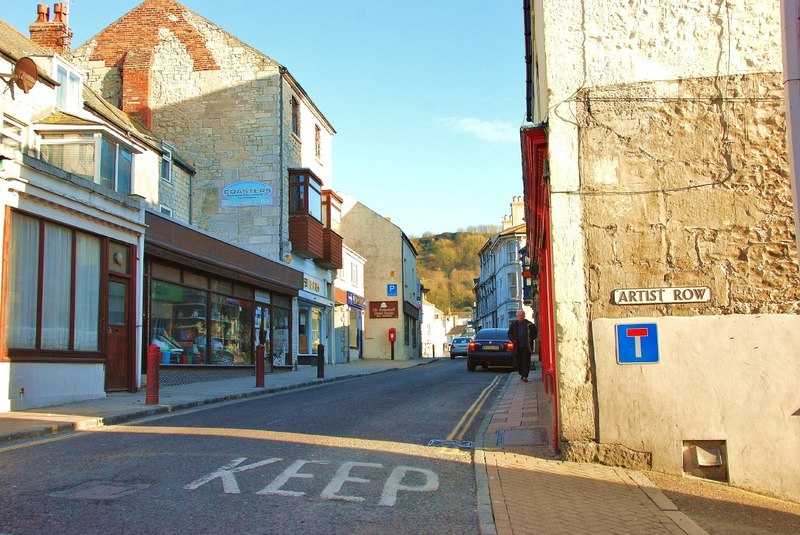
The one-way street through Fortuneswell.

Over the last few decades, many shops in Fortuneswell have changed hands frequently, while a few shops have lasted longer periods. The New Star Inn, Royal Portland Arms and the Britannia Inn are all pubs located in Fortuneswell. The no longer remaining Regal Cinema was built in Fortuneswell during 1932. It later became a Bingo hall, and then the Rumours Nightclub in the 1990s. A victim of suspected arson, the nightclub caught fire one evening in 1992 and the remaining shell was demolished soon after. The former primitive Methodists church is now the Royal Manor Theatre. The Theatre is one of only a few amateur dramatic company's that actually own their own premises and the company itself is run entirely by volunteers.

A reminder of industry in the back streets of Fortuneswell is an old Victorian steam laundry, built in 1900, which later housed a Defence Industry Contractor. In 1793 Robert Carr Brackenbury erected a small Methodist church within the village, known as Brackenbury's Chapel. It was later replaced by the Underhill Methodist Church of 1899. Opposite the church is the Portland Council Offices, which were built in 1934, and possess a fine council chamber.

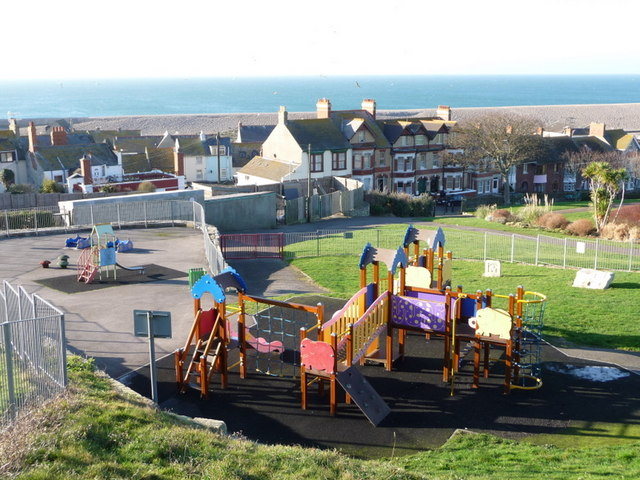
The play area of Victoria Gardens.

Located in Fortuneswell and close to the villages of Castletown and Chiswell is Victoria Gardens, which were opened in 1904 to mark the 1897 Diamond Jubilee of Queen Victoria. Towards the highest point of Fortuneswell, heading towards Priory Corner, is Old Hill – a very steep footpath linking Underhill with Tophill. It was once a main route for those travelling from Tophill.

Infant and primary education within the village became provided by Isle of Portland Aldridge Community Academy in 2012. The two schools within Fortuneswell, Brackenbury Infant School (including the Community Nursery) and Underhill Community Junior School, both closed in 2014, along with other schools on the island, all to be replaced by a new school situated at Southwell Business Park in 2016. Fortuneswell was also home to Brackenbury Day School, which is now the Brackenbury Centre.

=== Grade listed features ===
Fortuneswell has a wide array of architecture and buildings, a number of which are Grade Listed. There are some particularly older dwellings nestled beside Victorian and later built houses. Bow Cottage, and its boundary wall, at Artist Row, 116 and 118 Fortuneswell, 81 Fortuneswell, 6 and 8 Fortuneswell, 59 and 61 Fortuneswell, the ex-Post Office at 79 Fortuneswell, and 165 Fortuneswell are all Grade II Listed.

Queen Anne House at the top of Fortuneswell, was built circa 1720 by architect and quarry merchant Thomas Gilbert, The house, along with its boundary wall and gate piers became Grade II* Listed in May 1993. Another particularly grand house is The Captain's House, located at the bottom of Mallams. The house has been subject to local stories, as it stood in ruin for over one hundred years before being privately renovated in the late 1990s. It is a Grade II listed building. At Old Hill is the Old Rectory, which was originally the rectory to St. George Church. It later became a private hotel, and then three dwellings. It is Grade II Listed. Overlooking Victoria Gardens is a former police station. The station and its courtroom are dated 1904 and 1906, and became Grade II Listed in May 1993. The front boundary wall and steps to the station are also Grade II Listed. 1, 2 and 3 Castle Road, former police dwellings, are Grade II Listed too.

High Street contains various notable houses, and was once a separate hamlet known as Maiden Well. This is past the upper end of Chiswell, where the road turns into Fortuneswell and becomes High Street. 58 High Street, 62 (Tenastelion) and 64 High Street, 147 High Street, 137 and 139 High Street, 163 High Street, 60 High Street, and its attached outbuilding, 165 High Street, 107 and 109 High Street, 135 High Street, 141 High Street, including its boundary walls, piers and gate, 159 and 161 High Street, and 10 High Street and its attached outbuilding, are all Grade II Listed. At the bottom of the street is Maiden Well, the remains of a boundary wall and well head or cistern, probably of 18th-century origin. It is also Grade II Listed.

The steep street Mallams was once a separate hamlet from Fortuneswell, and features various notable buildings - with the road having extensive terraces from the 18th and 19th centuries. 53 and 60 Mallams, 17 Mallams, 19 Mallams, 42 Mallams, 62 and 64 Mallams, 58 Mallams, and Fair Winds (63 Mallams) are all Grade II Listed. Also at Mallams is a K6 Telephone Kiosk found opposite No. 63 Mallams, and is also Grade II Listed. It was designed in 1935 by Sir Giles Gilbert Scott.

St. John's Church was built on a steep hillside in Fortuneswell in 1838–40 by John Hancock of Weymouth. The building has been Grade II Listed since January 1951, and the churchyard walls, gate piers, railings, and steps, dating from 1839–1840, became Grade II Listed in September 1978 at the same time as two headstone monuments, about 5 metres north east from the west tower of the church.

The Royal Portland Arms is Grade II Listed, and dates from the mid-19th century and was often visited by King George III. Both the New Star Inn and the Britannia Inn are Grade II Listed too. At Hambro Road is a War Department/Admiralty boundary stone dating from the 19th century, which became Grade II Listed at the same time as two other similar boundary stones found at the junction of New Road and Old Hill.

== Notable people ==
- Edgar F. Codd, invented the relational model for databases while working for IBM.
