= Conjurer's Lodge =

Building in Portland, Dorset, England

Coordinates: 50.5610°N 2.4477°W

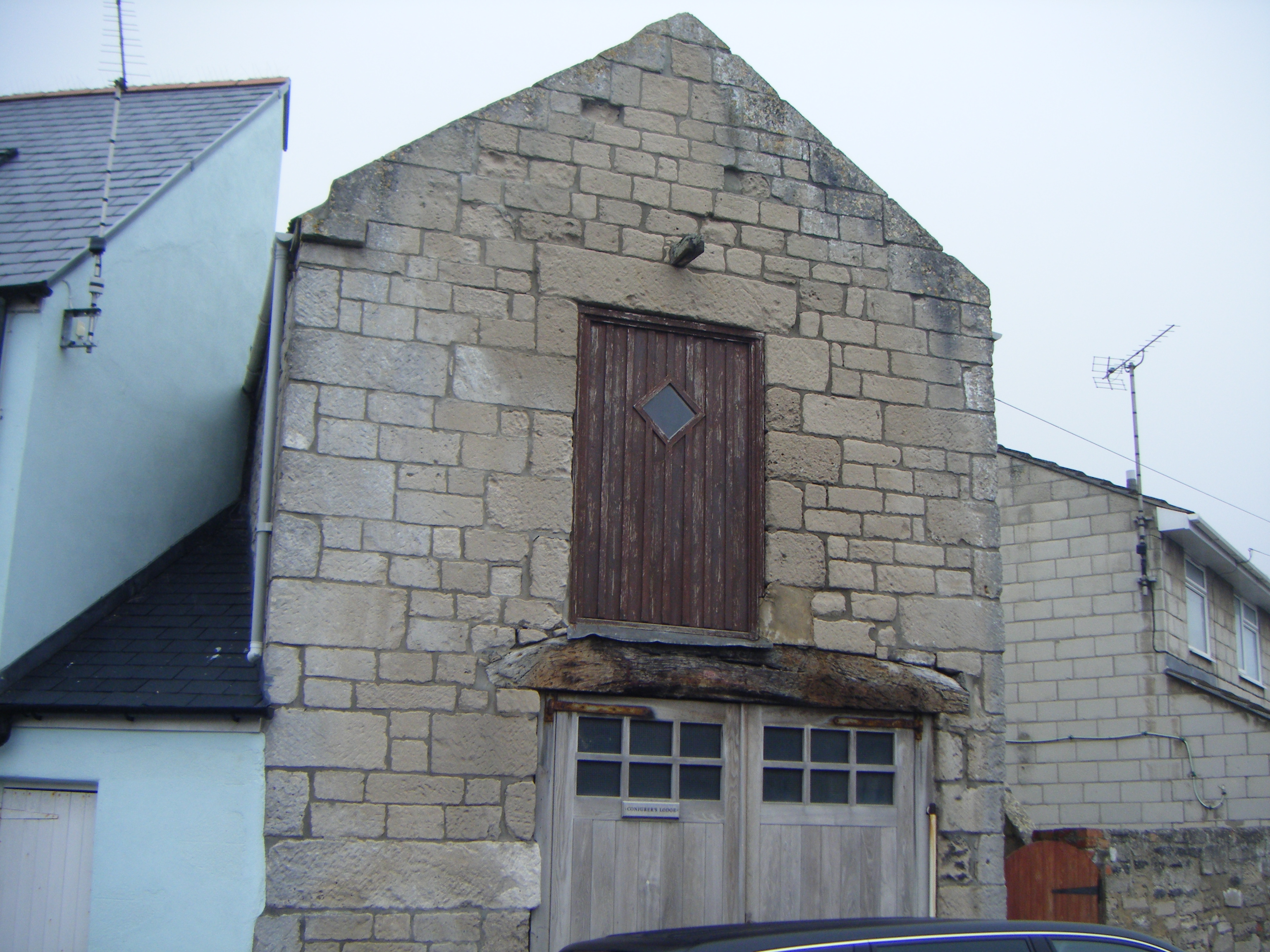
Conjurers Lodge, as seen in 2015.

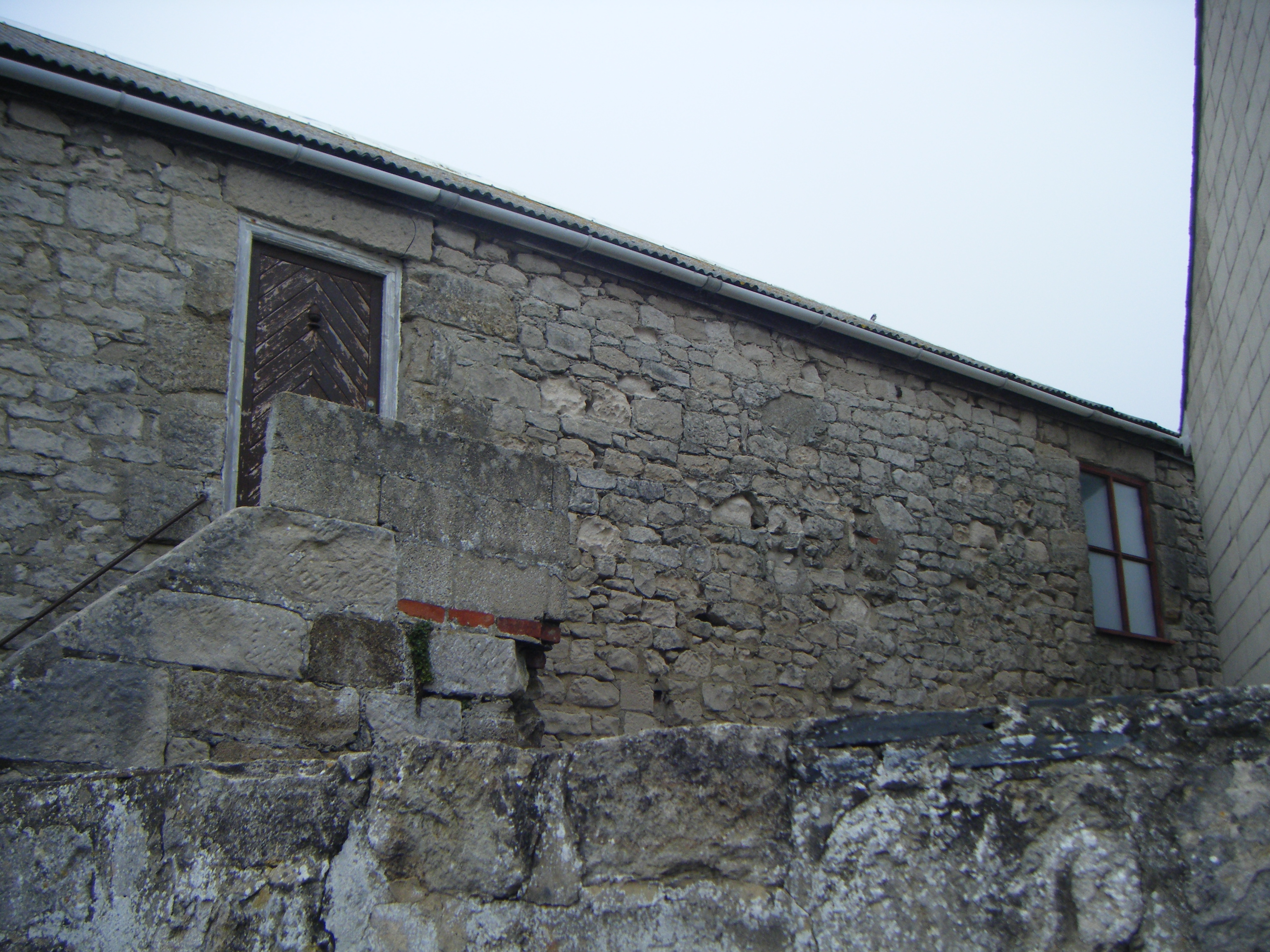
The upper level of the building was used as a chapel, reached by external steps.

Conjurers Lodge is a former Methodist chapel and workshop on the Isle of Portland, Dorset, England. It is located on the corner of Clements Lane within the village of Chiswell. Established in 1816 (209 years ago), the chapel was in use for a decade. The lodge has been Grade II Listed since 1993 and is described as a "rare surviving example of its kind" on the island.

Following rumours of local Methodists believing in witchcraft, investigations by Rev. Francis Derry led to 50 members of Portland's society being expelled in 1816. This group then established a chapel on the upper floor of a workshop in Chiswell, which gained the name Conjurers Lodge. It remained in use for ten years until 1826, when the Methodist society was united once again. Portland Joinery later used the building as a workshop from 1973 to 2003.
