= The Captain's House =

Building in Portland, Dorset, England

Coordinates: 50.5596°N 2.4457°W

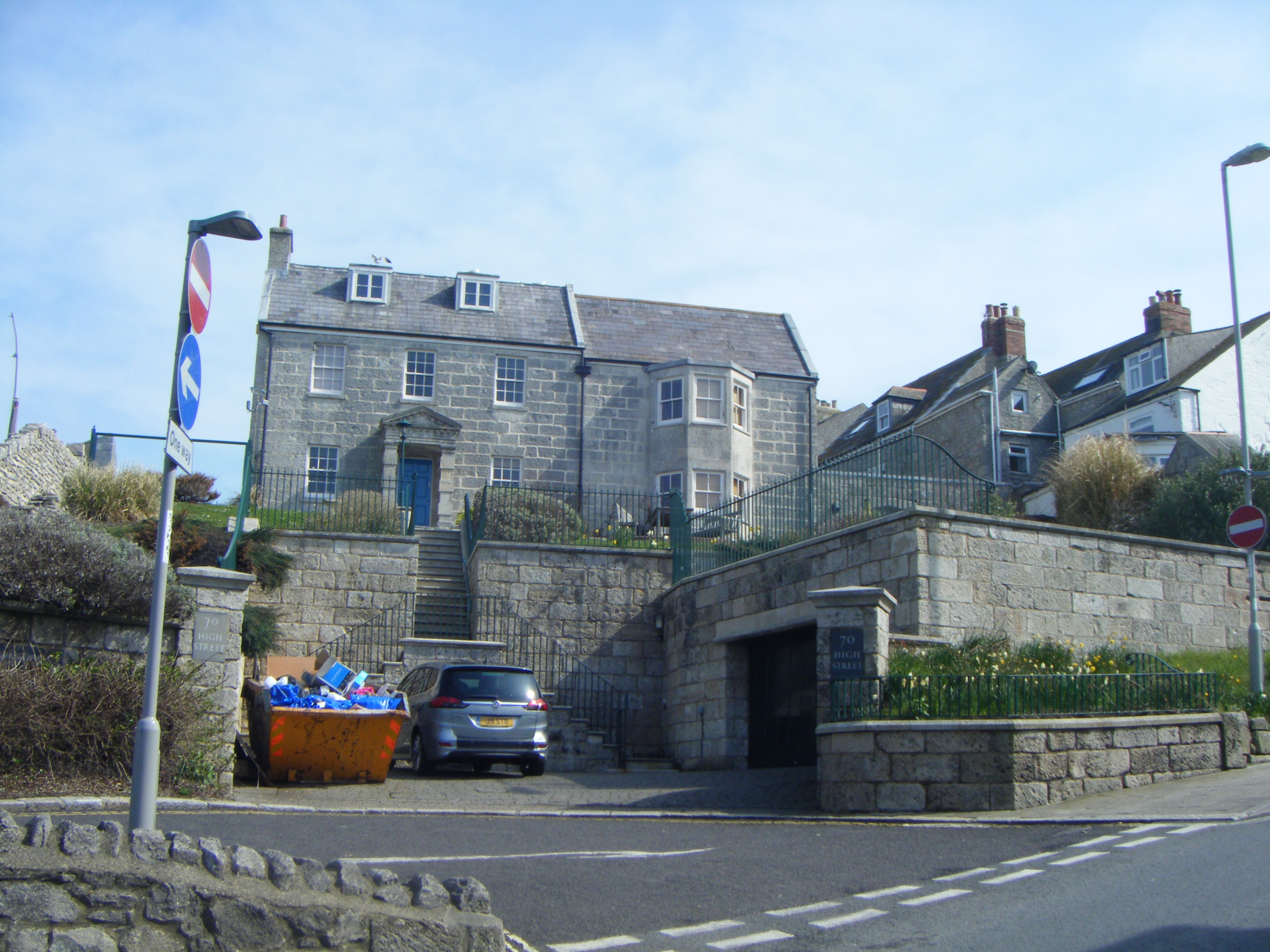
The Captain's House after renovation in 2014.

The Captain's House is a large detached house located at the bottom of Mallams, near the villages of Chiswell and Fortuneswell, on the Isle of Portland, Dorset, England. The house, together with the attached wall to the south east, has been a Grade II listed building since September 1978. It is not to be confused with another Captain's House on Portland, in Castletown, a large detached house, adjoining Portland Castle.

The earliest parts of the Captain's House have been dated to the 17th century. It was formerly one of the grandest in the Underhill area, but later became a ruin in the late 19th century following the death of the last occupant John Comben Lano in 1866. It remained in the same state for over one hundred years until work began in 1995 on the restoration of the house, which was completed in 1998.
