= United Reformed Church, Portland =

Church in Dorset, England

Coordinates: 50.5598°N 2.4470°W

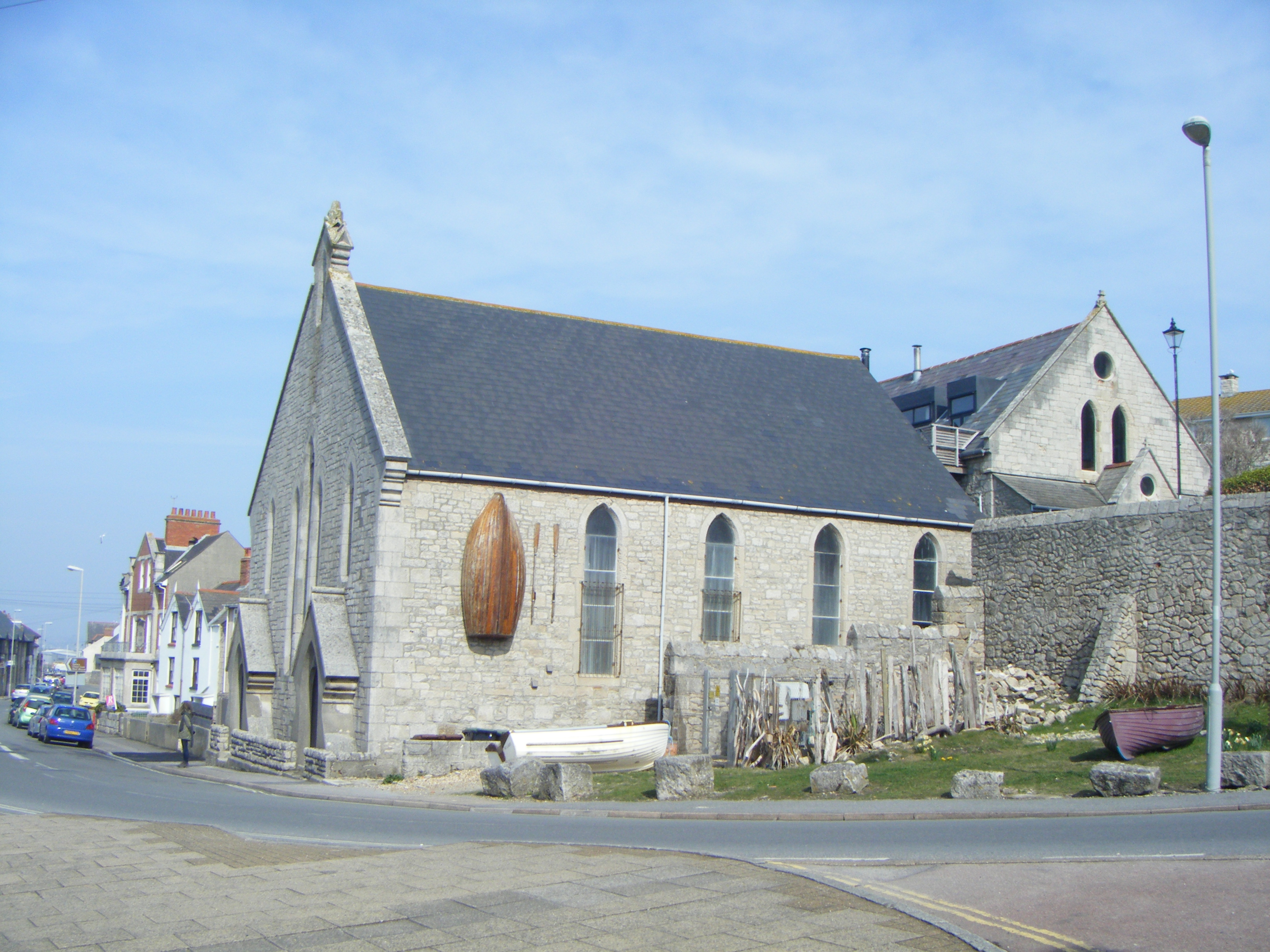
United Reformed Church

The United Reformed Church is a former United Reformed Church in Chiswell, on the Isle of Portland, Dorset, England. It was founded in 1825 and closed in 2009.

== History ==
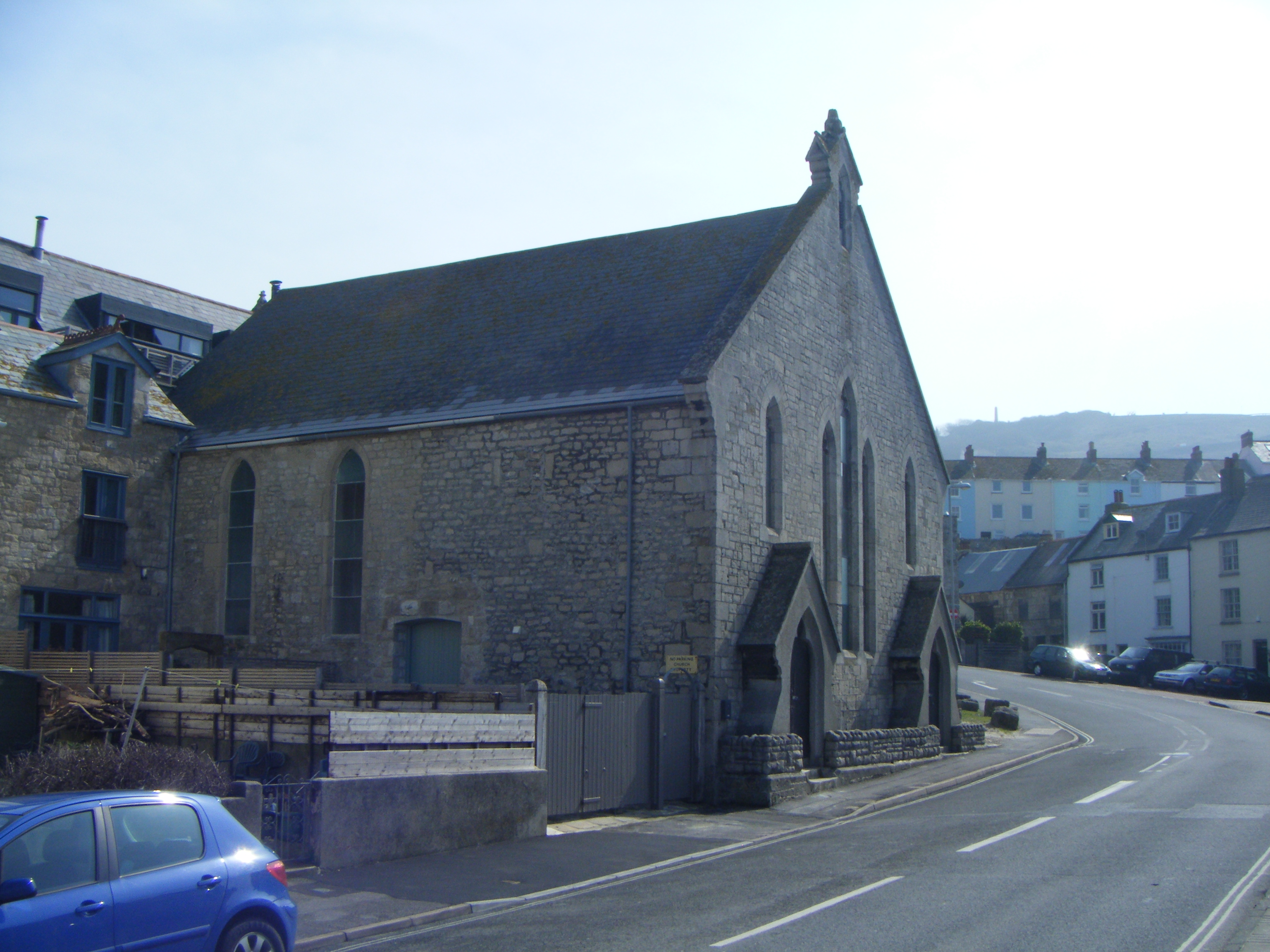
United Reformed Church

The United Reformed Church was founded in 1825 when the people of Chiswell, the oldest settlement on the island, banded together to convert a barn and stable into a place of worship. By 1827, Chiswell had to accommodate the growing congregation and as a result the first chapel was built during 1827–28. The church flourished under the guidance of the Rev JH Crump. The first pastor appointed to Portland was the Rev Frederick William Meadows. The next pastor, Rev C Cannon, died in office in 1854, whilst in those years the building had become too small for the growing congregation.

As the building was not large enough for the local congregation, a new church opened on the same site. Rev James Cheney, described in the church records as "a remarkable, resourceful and skilful man", was the guiding light for the building that stands in Chiswell today, which was opened by 21 October 1858. The church was first known as the Independent Chapel, as well as the Union Chapel, then the Congregational Church. It became known as the United Reformed Church in 1972.

However, by the 21st century, the numbers in the congregation had dramatically dropped. Seven local people decided to team together in an attempt to the keep the church open by dealing with administration and fund raising. Despite various attempts by the congregation to save it, the church's final service was held on 27 September 2009, conducted by the Rev Bob Damer. Although the building's future was uncertain, renovations have begun.
