= The Old Rectory, Fortuneswell =

House in Portland, Dorset, England

Coordinates: 50°33′25″N 2°26′27″W

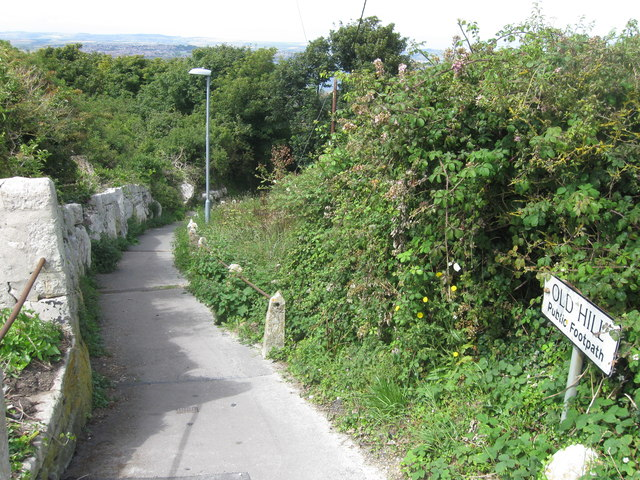
Boundary walls (on left)

The Old Rectory is a historic building in Fortuneswell on the Isle of Portland, Dorset.

== History ==
The 18th-century building was constructed as a rectory for Church of St George, Reforne. It was later used as a hotel before its conversion into dwellings. It was enlarged and remodelled in 1825. On 17 May 1993, The Old Rectory was made a Grade II listed building.
