= Chiswell =

Village on the Isle of Portland, England

Coordinates: 50.5620°N 2.4487°W

- Location within Dorset
- OS grid reference: SY689732
- Civil parish: Portland
- Unitary authority: Dorset
- Ceremonial county: Dorset
- Region: South West
- Country: England
- Sovereign state: United Kingdom
- Post town: Dorchester
- Postcode district: DT5
- Dialling code: 01305
- Police: Dorset
- Fire: Dorset and Wiltshire
- Ambulance: South Western
- UK Parliament: South Dorset

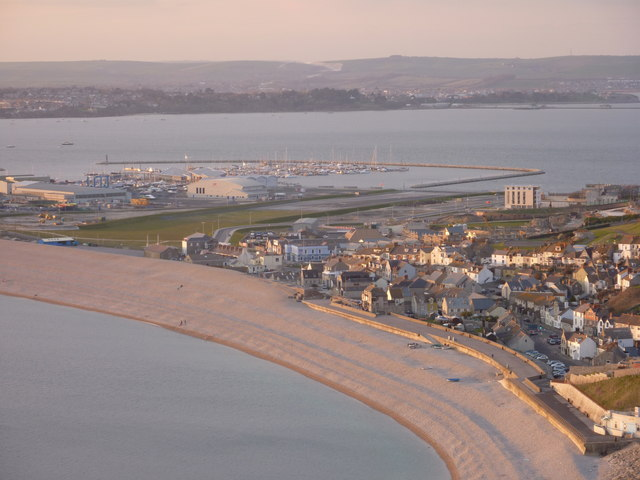
Chiswell from Tophill.

Chiswell /ˈtʃɪzəl/, sometimes /ˈtʃɪzwɛl/, is a small village at the southern end of Chesil Beach, in Underhill, on the Isle of Portland in Dorset. It is the oldest settlement on the island, having formerly been known as Chesilton. The small bay at Chiswell is called Chesil Cove, and the beach promenade and sea wall which form Chiswell's coastal defences are a prominent feature.

The village occupies much of the flat land close to sea level adjacent to the beach, and is distinguished from the adjoining village of Fortuneswell which occupies the steeper hills and streets above. At the northern entrance to the village is the 19th-century development of Victoria Square, which forms a roundabout on the main A354 road onto the island.

As with the other villages and settlements on Portland, Chiswell was designated as a conservation area as part of Underhill in 1976, as it is a place of special architectural and historic interest.

== History ==
Chiswell was established predominantly as a fishing community alongside the pebble bank of Chesil Cove. The settlement dates back to Roman times when it was known as "Coesl". A small tidal creek known as the Mere formerly reached Chiswell, but it progressively silted up as the settlement expanded around it. Many of the village's stone and thatched cottages were originally established on the shingle of Chesil Beach.

Despite its vulnerability to sea storms and flooding Chiswell developed into a thriving community, and by the beginning of the 19th century it had become well established as a "burgeoning centre of trade and exchange". In the 19th century Chiswell was predominantly inhabited by fishermen, quarrymen, traders and their families and was the island's biggest settlement.

Frequent incidents of flooding were part of village life. One of the best-documented incidents of flooding was the Great Storm of 1824. Chiswell received the full force of the storm, which saw the death of thirty residents, the destruction of eighty houses and damage to many others, damage so extensive that the village never made a full recovery.

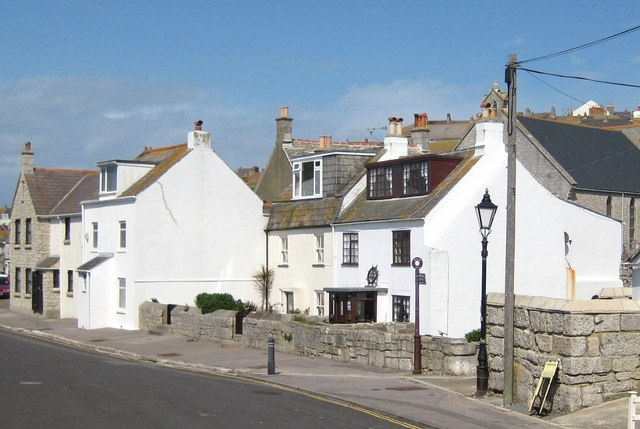
Chiswell Cottages

Traces of the effect the storm had on the village can be seen today. On the west side of the main street the house frontages have gaps, some from loss of buildings but others from purpose-built ‘opes’, a local term used in street names such as Big Ope. These are the locally unique way of providing floodways during storm surges and allowing access to small rear building groups as well as the beach.

Throughout the 20th century Chiswell continued to lose its character and saw further decline. The first half of the 20th century had seen a number of calls for some form of protection from sea flooding. During 1942, the engineers Coode & Partners drew up plans for such measures, but lack of funding had once again stopped any such project from commencing.

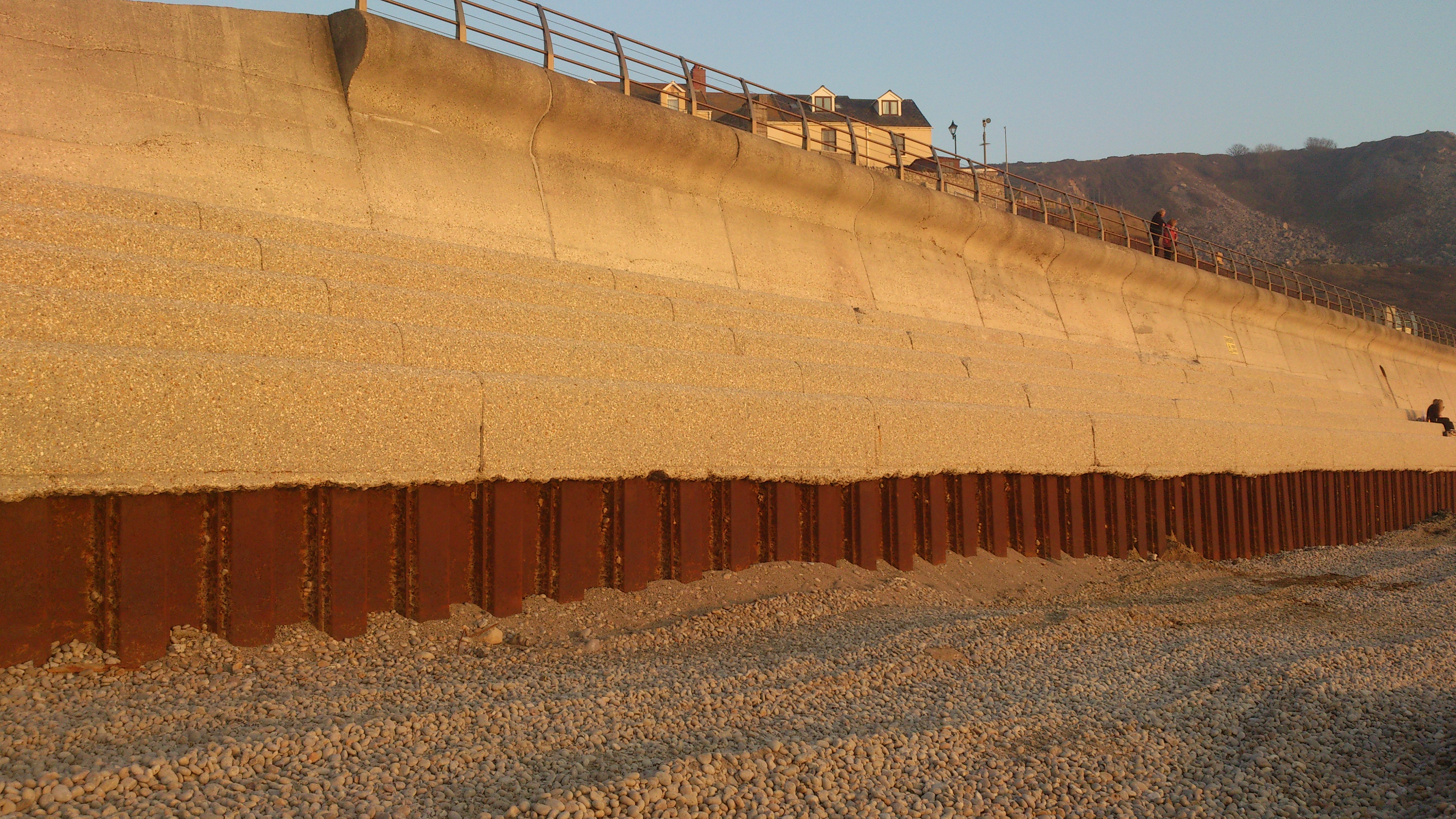
Steel and concrete flood defences visible beneath the beach at Chesil Cove.

The construction of a sea wall finally commenced in 1958, and continued until 1965. The wall extended from the far end of Chesil Cove to the Cove House Inn. As well as providing a new promenade on its top, the wall reduced the risk of flooding in the village and deterred further coastal erosion.

Despite the sea wall two major storms in December 1978 and February 1979 caused further devastation to Chiswell, leading to the installation of further defence from 1983 to 1986.

In January 1990 Cyclone Daria hit Chesil Cove and the sea overwhelmed the defensive wall, causing extensive damage and temporarily closing access to and from the mainland. During January and February 2014 violent storms across southwest England caused more flooding in the village, which received a lot of national and international attention. A hole in the seawall, the gabions and the promenade all had to be repaired, and the flood alleviation channel and the beach itself had to be reprofiled to restore it for any future floods.

== Features ==
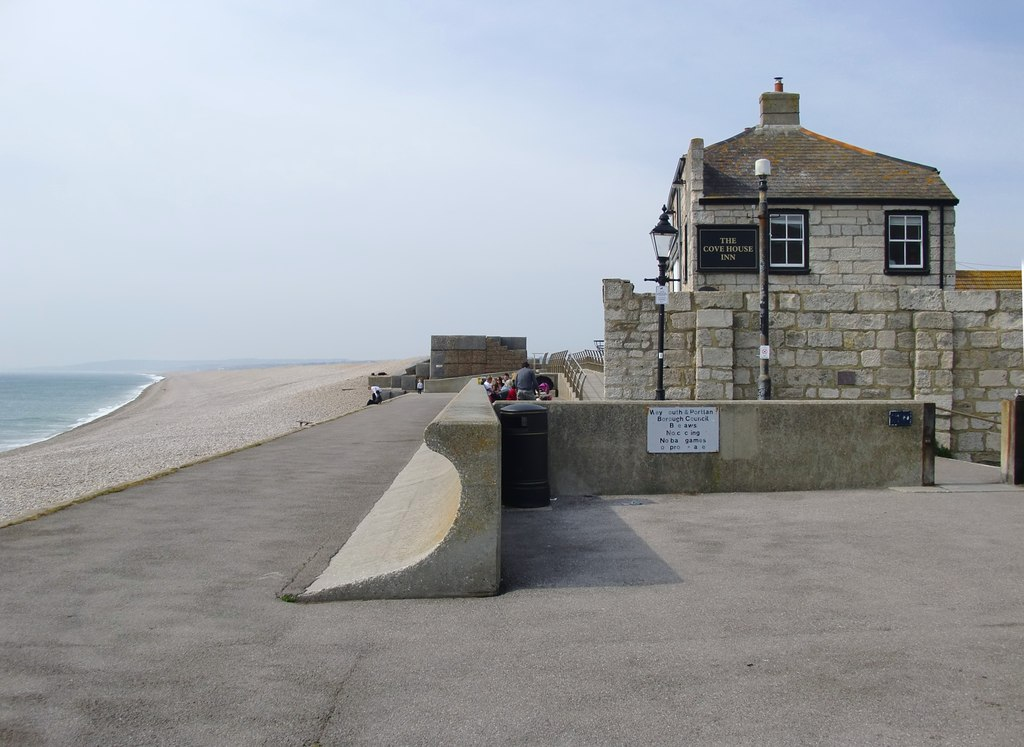
The Cove House Inn and part of the esplanade.

The majority of the buildings in the village are now for strictly residential use, with some buildings used for tourism such as in bed and breakfasts and holiday lets, and some commercial premises such as public houses and restaurants. The former United Reformed Church and manse remain a focal point on the main street, despite having closed to congregations in 2009.

The A354 road runs northbound through Chiswell, and at the street's widest point is the village square which now serves as a car parking area. To the east of the main street is a stretch of open, higher ground acting as a buffer that separates Chiswell from Fortuneswell.

The Chiswell Walled Garden was created between 2001 and 2006 by the Chiswell Community Trust within the walls of an old house that remains in ruin. It is maintained by volunteer members of the Trust and is open to the public.

=== Grade listed features ===
Chiswell has a wide array of architecture and buildings, a number of which are Grade Listed by Historic England. Some buildings have existed at least in part since the 1600s.

List of National Heritage features
Location	Grade	Listing date	Listing number	Notes
The Cove House Inn	II	17 May 1993	1280745	Has occupied part of Chesil Beach since the 18th century. Listing describes the current public house as from the early 19th century with earlier origins.
The Little Ship	II	17 May 1993	1206281	Mid 19th century public house in Victoria Square.
The Royal Victoria Hotel	II	17 May 1993	1281836	Hotel and inn from circa 1870 in Victoria Square.
185 Brandy Lane	II	18 November 1977	1281887	Early 19th century.
Fisherman's Cottage, 187/189 Brandy Lane	II	21 September 1978	1203070	Originally two dwellings from the early 19th century.
Cottage east of 189 Brandy Lane	II	21 September 1978	1203072	Early 19th century.
193 Brandy Lane	II	23 July 1975	1203071	Early 19th century.
195 and 197 Brandy Row	II	23 July 1975	1203069	Early 19th century.
199 Brandy Row	II	17 May 1993	1281848	Now derelict and used as stores/workshops, probably dating from the mid to late 18th century.
86 Chiswell	II	21 September 1978	1205339	Early to mid 19th century.
90 and 92 Chiswell	II	17 May 1993	1203076	Probably from the 17th century but raised and refronted in late 19th century.
120 Chiswell	II	23 July 1975	1203077	Early 19th century with some parts possibly dating earlier.
139 Chiswell	II	23 July 1975	1280773	Detached house from the early to mid 18th century listed with its boundary wall.
Workshop adjoining 46 Chiswell	II	23 July 1975	1281851	Store or workshop from the 19th century, possibly earlier.
Dolphin and Neptune Cottages	II	17 May 1993	1281852	Two joined cottages, probably formerly one property from the late 18th or early 19th century.
Ranters' Lodge	II	28 January 1987	1205359	Also known as "The Dead House", and its enclosing wall.
The Captain's House	II	21 September 1978	1280551	At the bottom of Mallams on the boundary of Fortuneswell and Chiswell. Stood in ruin for over one hundred years before being renovated in the late 1990s.
Conjurer's Lodge, Clement's Lane	II	17 May 1993	1203079	A late 18th-century or early 19th-century workshop, within which a chapel was set up after some local Methodists were accused as being witchcraft believers.
Details from Historic England's Listed Building Database. National Heritage List for England.
