= Victoria Square, Portland =

Public square in Portland, Dorset, England

Coordinates: 50.5633°N 2.4498°W

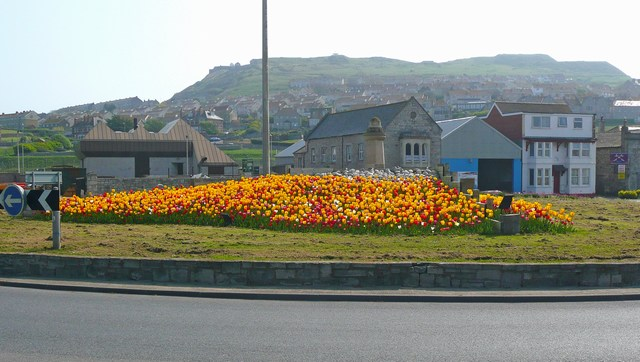
The roundabout at Victoria Square.

Victoria Square is a public square on the Isle of Portland, Dorset, England. Developed in the 19th century, it is situated at the entrance to Portland, close to Chesil Beach, Osprey Quay, and the small fishing village of Chiswell.

== History ==
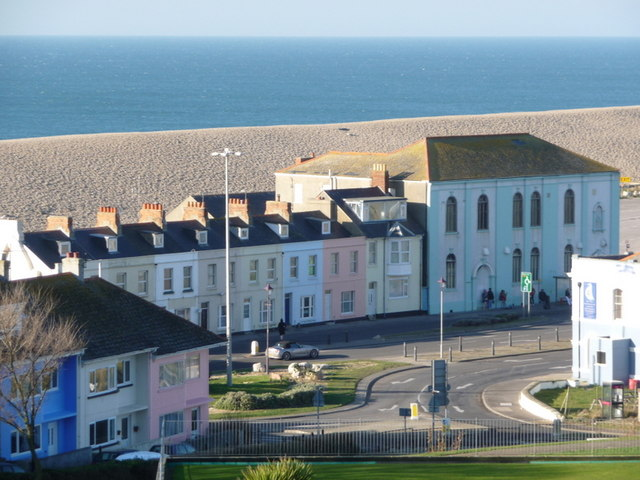
The view from Victoria Gardens down to the square.

Victoria Square was developed in association with the Portland Branch Railway, which commenced construction in 1860 and opened in 1865. With the Portland station being erected at the entrance to Underhill, Captain Charles Augustus Manning developed the surrounding area into a square at his sole expense, made up of the Royal Victoria Hotel and a terrace opposite.

A range of businesses soon based themselves in the square, including the Portland Gas Works in 1863. A sawmill was erected next to the railway station, by the Portland Stone Company. A public house known as The Terminus Hotel was also built at the square, and later renamed the Little Ship. Portland's first Masonic Hall was erected in 1878 at Victoria Square, and was later replaced with a new hall opposite the original in 1898.

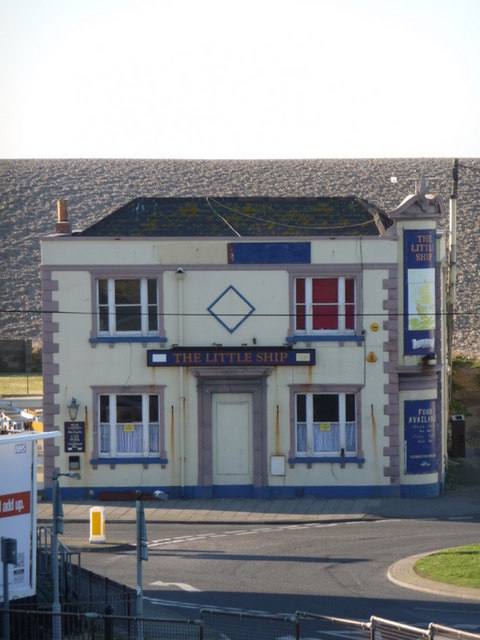
The Little Ship.

The Second World War brought many air raids to Portland due to the important naval base. A minefield was laid near the square, along with a tank trap. When Weymouth and Portland became an embarkation point of Allied Forces for D-Day in 1944, the Royal Victoria Lodge was used as a makeshift hospital. Following the closure of the Portland Gas Works in 1959, the site became a plant hire yard.

Portland's railway operated until it closed to passengers in 1952 and goods in 1965. In 1969, the square's railway station was demolished and replaced by a roundabout. A commemorative stone and plaque was later placed near the square. Despite the construction of Chesil Cove's sea wall in 1958–1965, incidents of widespread flooding still occurred, including in December 1978 and February 1979, when two major storms flooded Chiswell and Victoria Square. Further flood prevention measures were then put in place in the 1980s.

Victoria Square underwent refurbishment in 1995, with a commemorative stone unveiled by the Duke of York the following year. The northern area of the square is occupied by grassland and contains two ornamental pillars of Portland stone. They were unveiled in June 2004 and designed to be used as safe nesting sites for seagulls. Close to the square is the Portland Skate Park, which was established around 2005 at a cost of £20,000. By 2009 it had fallen into disrepair and was replaced with a new £200,000 park, which was officially opened in November 2010, when 150 young people from across Dorset attended the event.

== Grade listed buildings ==
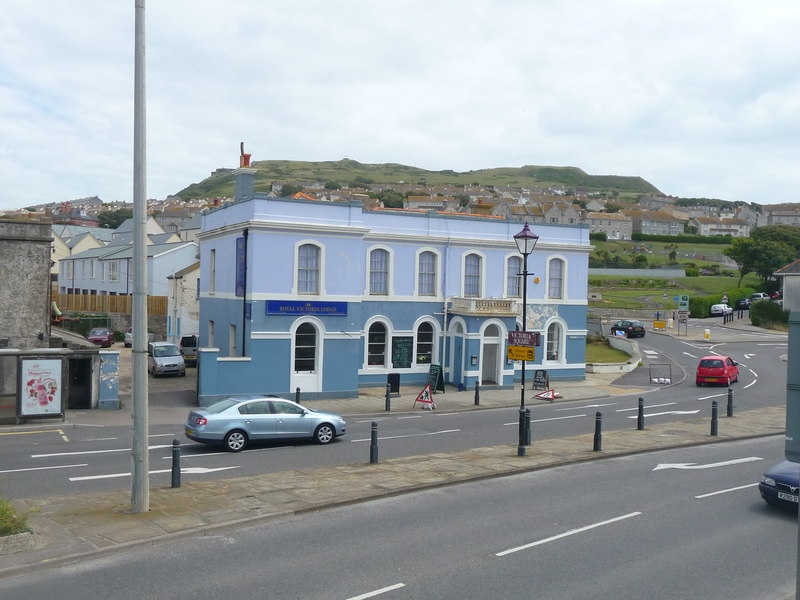
The Royal Victoria Lodge as seen in 2011.

The Little Ship, a pub located at Victoria Square, became Grade II Listed in May 1993. The building, externally, is a complete example of a modest classical-style Victorian pub, holding a very important corner to this square. The Royal Victoria Hotel also became Grade II Listed at the same time. Again it holds an important position on the corner of the square, complementing The Little Ship opposite.
