= Lerret =

Traditional fishing boat

A lerret exhibited at the Portland Royal Naval Air Station. It was built by Clark's Boatworks in 1914 and named Silver Star.

A lerret is a type of rowing boat designed for use off the Chesil Beach in Dorset. It is of wooden, clinker construction and varied in size, depending on the number of oars – the largest would have up to eight. It was primarily used for fishing but, in emergencies, lerrets would be used as lifeboats.

== Construction ==
It was an open clinker-built rowing boat about 16 feet long with a beam of about 5–6 feet, when rowed by 2 to 4 pairs of rowers. To facilitate launching and beaching on the steep shingle of Chesil Beach, the stern was sharp with a high sternpost and the bottom of the craft was flat. A particular boat, Ena, which was built in 1905, was made with twelve planks of wych elm and steam-bent rock elm on each side. Its keel was made from pitch pine and it had four oars which were secured to the thole pins so that they would not float off while the crew worked the nets.

== History ==
The design dates back to the 17th century and the name is a contraction of Lady of Loretto – the first boat of this type was built by a local ship's master who had formerly traded with Italy and named it after the shrine at Loretto.

The craft were mainly used for seine fishing, catching shoals of mackerel every Autumn. Each village would have its own company and a six-oared boat would require a team of 14 men – six to row, one to pay out the net from the stern and the rest to handle the operations on the shore.

The numbers of lerrets declined from about a hundred to fifty at the end of the 19th century. The largest types with eight oars disappeared in the 1870s and the six-oared models went in the 1920s. In 2010, there were only about 4 left so a new one was built to preserve the type.

== Lifeboats ==
While the boat was built primarily for fishing, it was also handy in rough surf and so was used to rescue other vessels. When the Royal National Lifeboat Institution was formed, the Portland mariners preferred to keep their local lerrets for the purpose and so two were adopted as lifeboats.
