= Great Storm of 1824 =

1824 hurricane affecting Devon and Dorset

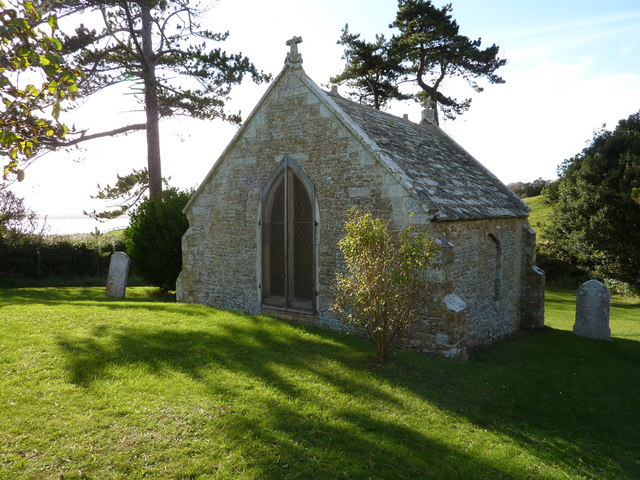
Fleet Old Church was destroyed in the storm but the chancel was retained.

The Great Storm of 1824 (or Great Gale) was a hurricane-force wind and storm surge that affected the south coast of England from 22 November 1824. The storm raged for two days.

Nearly 100 people were believed to be killed across the counties of Devon and Dorset.

== Event ==
At Sidmouth, low-lying houses along the Esplanade were inundated, and cottages at the exposed west end were destroyed. The 40 feet (12 m) sea-stack at Chit Rock was destroyed. In Plymouth, 22 vessels were sunk and over 200,000 tonnes of stone was swept away from the breakwater.

It destroyed the esplanade at Weymouth; it broke across Chesil Beach and the Fleet Lagoon, almost destroying the villages of Fleet and Chiswell. Many buildings in Melcombe Regis were destroyed. Preston and Lodmoor flooded.

In Lyme Regis it topped the Cobb, and destroyed about 90m of its length. According to the book Heroine of Lyme Regis by Harriot Forde, the house and fossil shop belonging to Mary Anning was flooded.

The ferry between the Isle of Portland and the mainland was washed away. Though coastal communities bore the brunt of the storm, inland areas were also damaged including Dorchester, where roofs were blown off and chimneys toppled, one of them killing a local clergyman and his wife.

The quays at Weymouth were overcome and most properties on the seafront and much of the lower part of the town were flooded by the deluge. The pier at the entrance of the harbour also sustained considerable damage, whilst boats and vessels were carried into the streets by the waves, where they drifted helplessly.

== Legacy ==
The year 2024 marked the bicentennial anniversary of the storm and was marked by events held in the area. An exhibition was organised by the Dorset Coast Forum with the Environment Agency and BCP Council. It was held in Portland, Lyme Regis, West Bay and Poole.
