= Chesil Beach =

Shingle beach in Dorset, England

- Beach
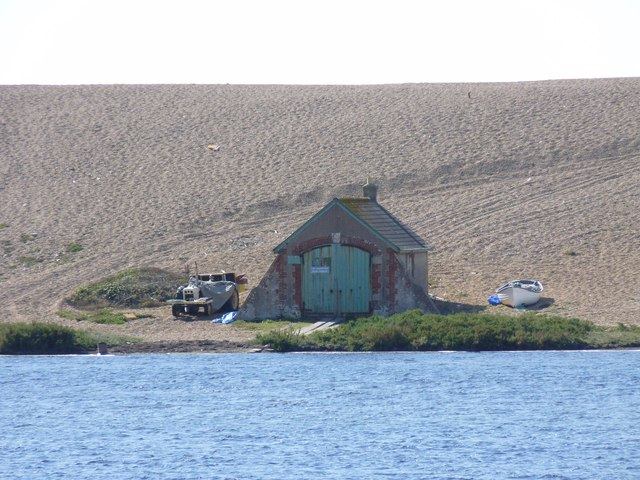
- Chesil Beach and the Fleet at Langton Herring

- Location within Dorset
- Coordinates: 50.604°N 2.516°W
- Grid position: SY635784
- Location: Dorset, England

Ramsar Wetland
- Official name: Chesil Beach & The Fleet
- Designated: 17 July 1985
- Reference no.: 300

Chesil Beach (also known as Chesil Bank) is a major shingle beach structure in Dorset, England. Behind the beach is the Fleet, a shallow tidal lagoon. The beach runs for a length of 29 kilometres (18 mi) from West Bay to the Isle of Portland and in places is up to 15 metres (50 ft) high and 200 metres (660 ft) wide. The beach is often identified as a tombolo, although research has revealed that it is in fact a barrier beach.

Chesil Beach and the Fleet are part of the Jurassic Coast (a UNESCO World Heritage Site) and the Dorset National Landscape (an Area of Outstanding Natural Beauty), and have several conservation designations. Simon Jenkins rates the view of Chesil Beach from Abbotsbury along the coast to Portland Bill as one of the top ten in England.

The name Chesil is derived from chessil (Old English ceosel or cisel), meaning "gravel" or "shingle".

The beach curves sharply at the eastern end, near the village of Chiswell, and forms Chesil Cove against the cliffs of the Isle of Portland, and this protects the low-lying village from flooding. It has been the scene of many shipwrecks and was named "Dead Man's Bay" by Thomas Hardy. The beach provides shelter from the prevailing winds and waves for the town of Weymouth, Dorset, and the village of Chiswell on Portland.

== Geomorphology ==
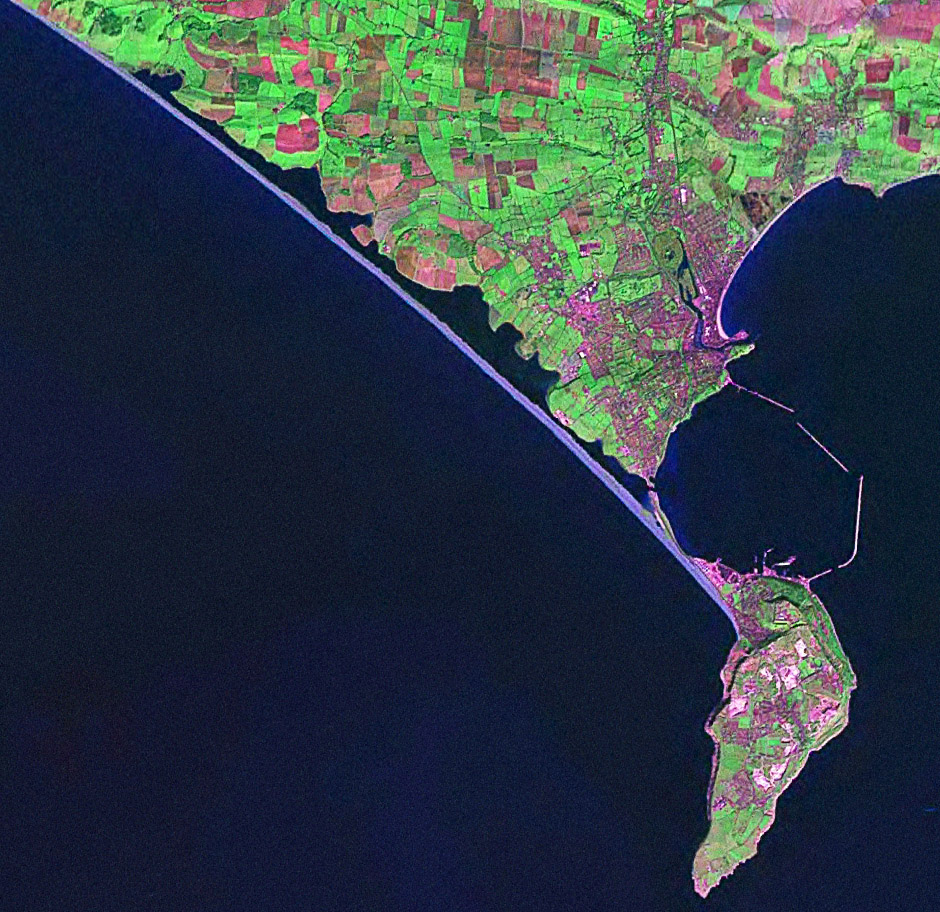
Satellite view of Chesil Beach (linear feature in blue running diagonally NW-SE) from Abbotsbury to the Isle of Portland

Chesil Beach is almost entirely made of stone shingle, and the typical size of stones reduces along the length of the beach. It is one of three major shingle beach structures in England, the other two being Dungeness in Kent, and Orford Ness in Suffolk.

The eastern limit of the beach as clearly defined by cliffs at Portland, but the western limit is more ambiguous. Today, the beach is interrupted by the harbour breakwaters of West Bay, and this is commonly taken as the western limit. Based on geomorphology, some sources argue that Eype or Golden Cap could be considered the natural western limit of the beach; others use a narrower definition, placing the limit between Abbotsbury and Bexington, on the basis of shingle grading and the beach only having a crest east of this section.

The origin of Chesil Beach has been argued over for some time, and is often identified as a tombolo. Originally it was believed that beach material was from the Budleigh Salterton pebble beds to the west, and later from Portland to the south east.

Research into the geomorphology of the area has revealed that it is in fact a barrier beach which has "rolled" landwards, joining the mainland with the Isle of Portland and giving the appearance of a tombolo. The differences between the pebbles on the beach and nearby sources is now put down to isostatic sea level rise in the Flandrian interglacial. Normally, tombolos are created due to the effects of the island on waves (through refraction) and to sediment transport, which usually produces a beach perpendicular to the mainland rather than parallel to it.

=== Assortment of pebble size ===
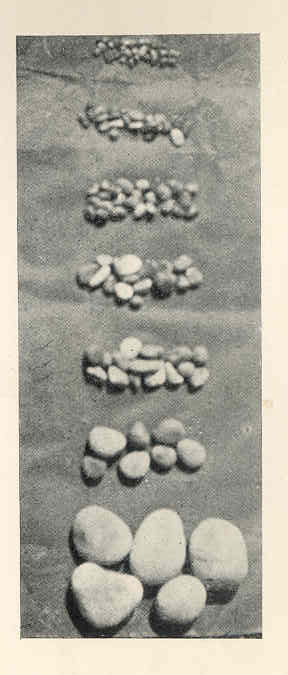
"Gradation of Stones from Burton Bradstock to Chesilton", 1910

The pebbles show a remarkable gradation in size along Chesil Beach, from around 5 cm long at the south or eastern Chiswell end to pea-sized at the north or western end at West Bay. People landing on the beach at night having been fishing, or smuggling, are said to have been able to work out their location based on the pebbles' size. The sorting of the pebbles is due to the difference in wave height and direction along the beach. The natural processes leading to this separation by size have been able to produce this effect as there are no sea defences along the beach to interrupt them, and few stones are being added or removed from the beach (either naturally or artificially).

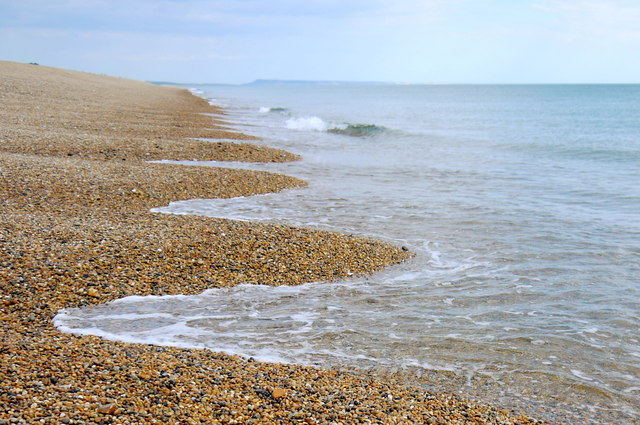
Effect of wave action on shingle transport

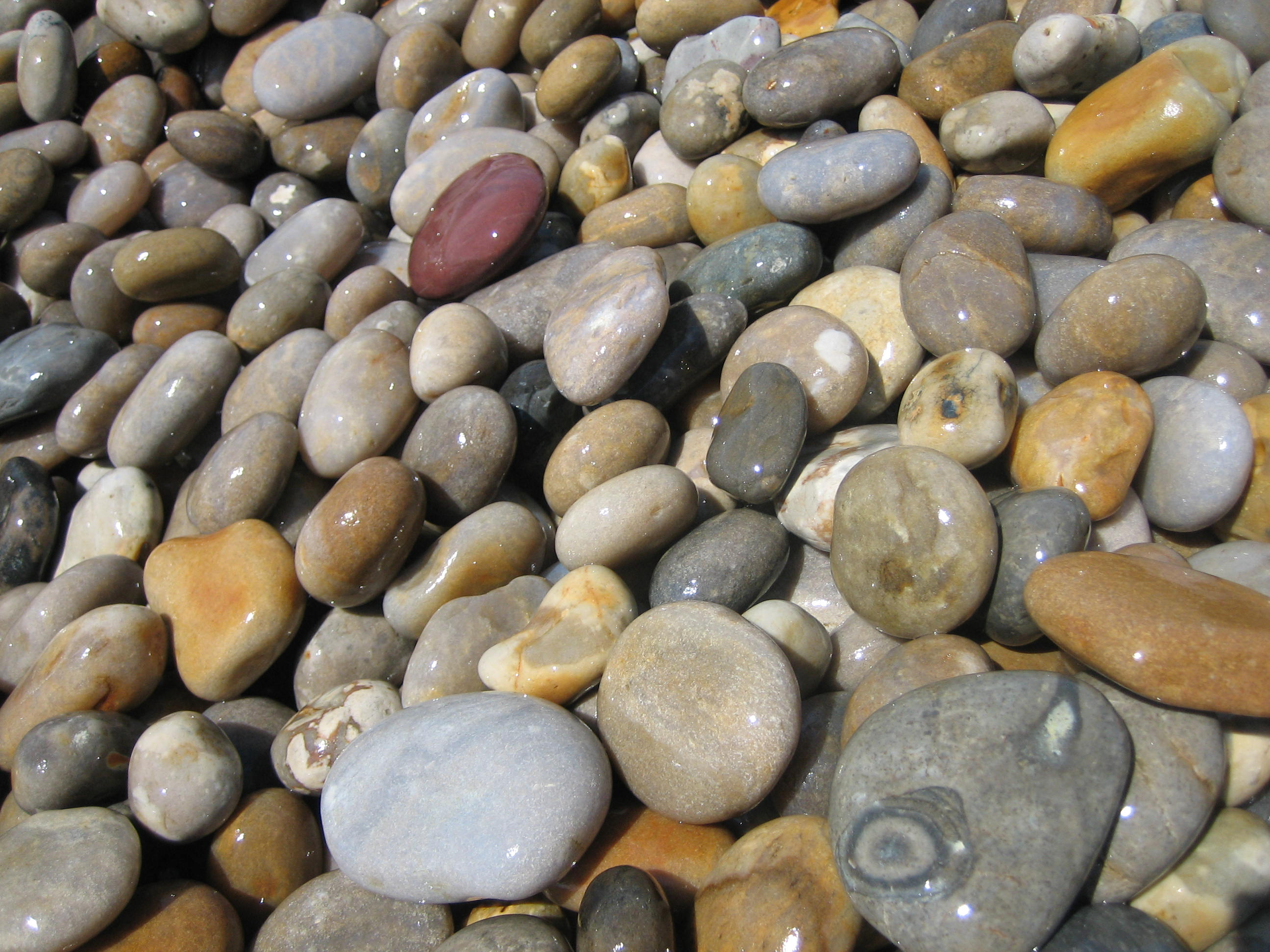
Large shingle at Chesil Cove (south-eastern end)

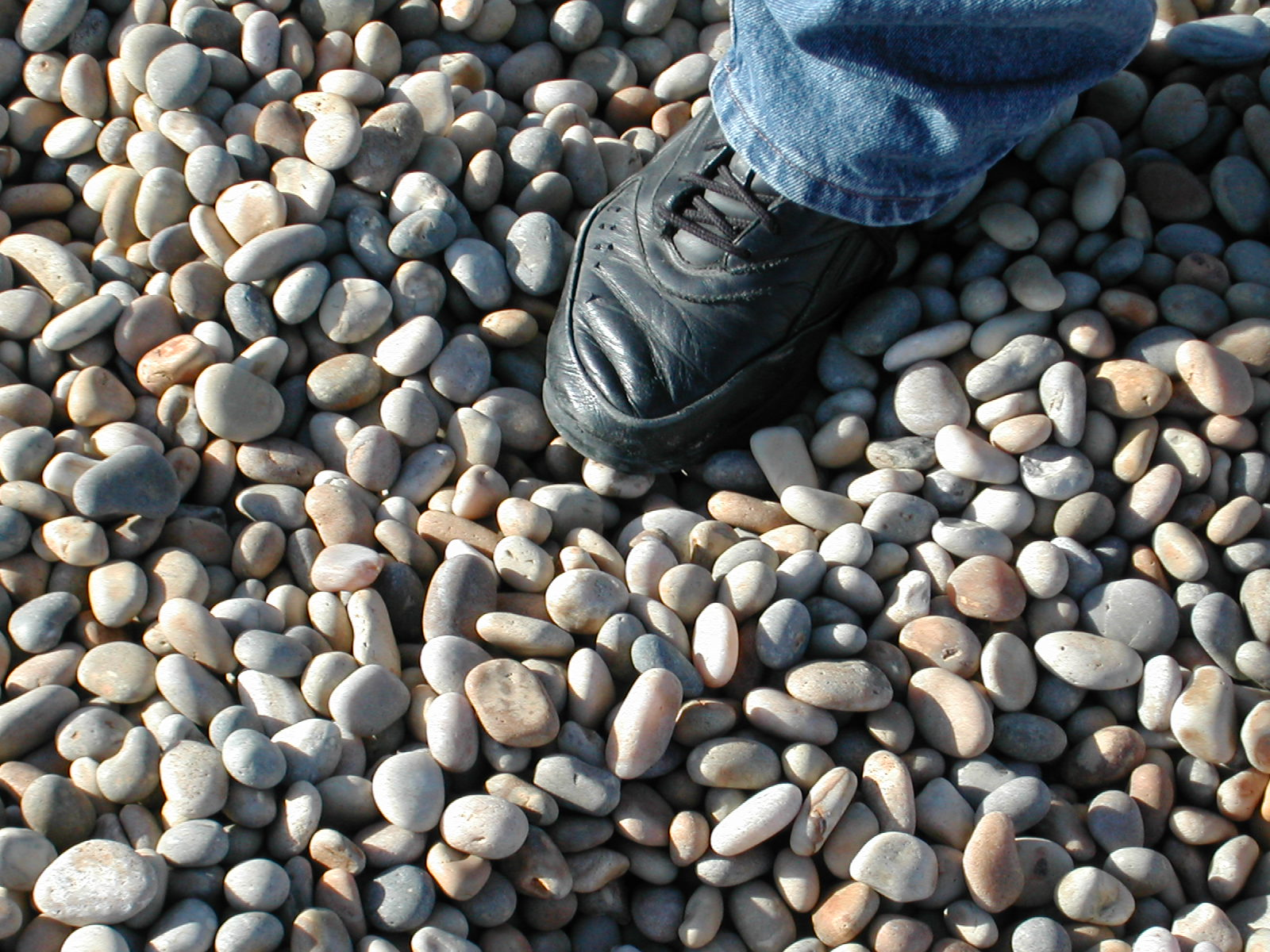
Large chert and flint shingle near the Portland (south-eastern) entrance to beach

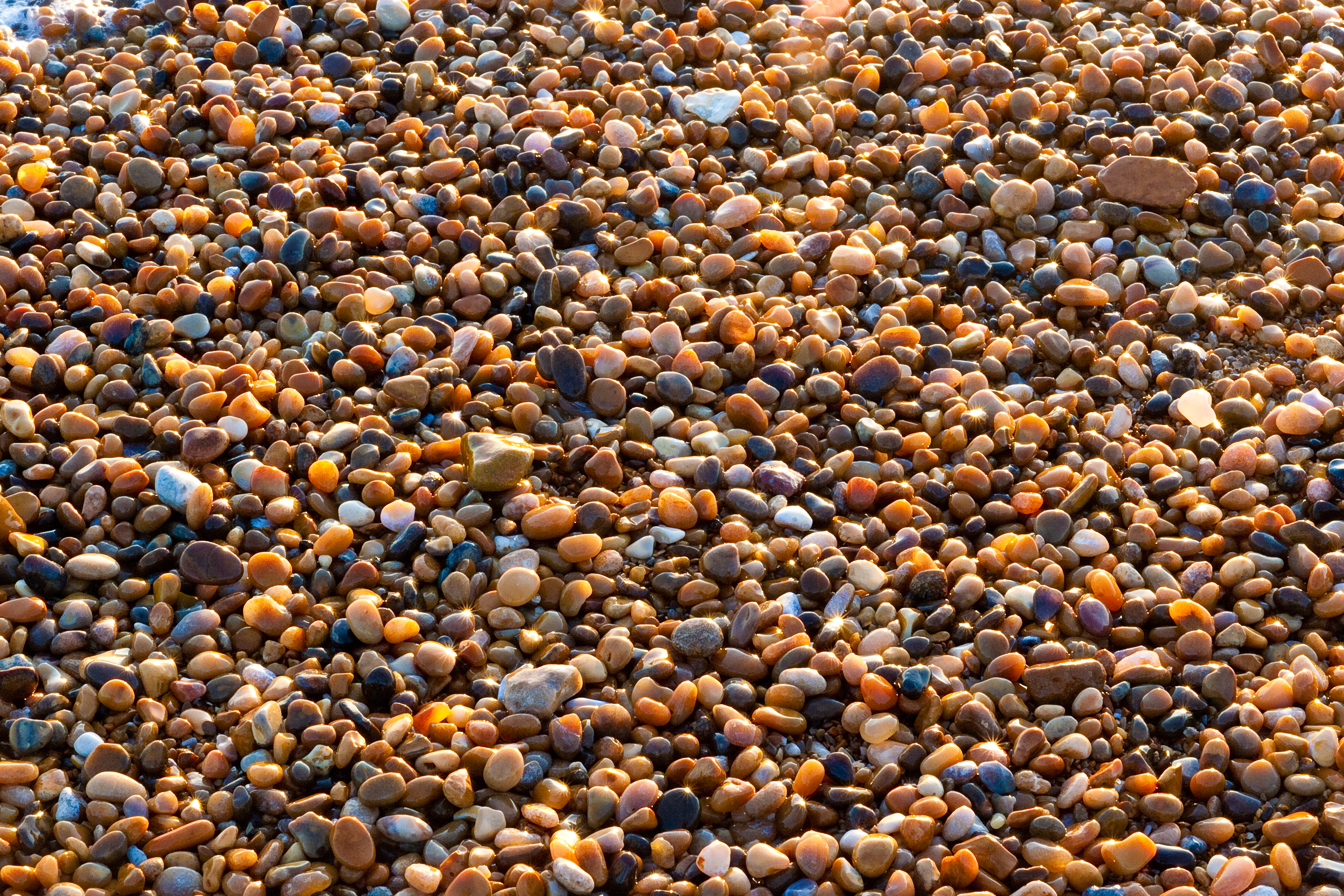
Towards the north-western end, the shingle becomes much smaller

== History ==
There have been many shipwrecks on Chesil Beach, particularly during the Age of Sail. The beach was particularly dangerous within the English Channel, as it forms an extended lee shore during south-westerly gales. A ship coming up the Channel had to clear Portland Bill to be safe, but the wind and tide would be pushing it northwards into Lyme Bay. When sailing ships were common, a strong string of coastguards were based along the beach, with lookouts and cottages at Chiswell, Wyke Regis, Chickerell, Langton Herring, Abbotsbury, East Bexington, Burton Bradstock and West Bay. At present there are no manned Coastguard lookouts along the beach, with coverage provided when required from the National Maritime Operations Centre based at Fareham. However, their observational role has been taken over by the National Coastwatch Institution, who have lookouts at Burton Bradstock (operational 2010) and Charmouth (operational 2016).

The local fishermen, particularly at Portland, developed a purpose-built vessel to withstand the sea actions of Chesil Beach. The boat, known as a lerret, is a double-ended open fishing boat — 16–17 ft (4.9–5.2 m) long — used for seine net fishing. It is usually rowed by four people with a fifth to steer and deploy the net.

Much of the villages of Fleet and Chiswell were destroyed in the Great Storm of 1824. Over the centuries Chiswell had battled with the sea and was regularly flooded during rough winter storms. In the storms the sea would pour through the upper part of the bank, and for this reason plans to drain the Fleet were abandoned in 1630. The great storm of November 1824 struck the village with disastrous results – an event from which Chiswell would never fully recover. Since then various defences have been set up to aid the village, notably the sea wall and promenade which commenced work in 1958 and was completed in 1965.

The Weymouth to Portland Railway line was opened in 1865, and built along the southern end of the beach. It closed to passengers in 1952 and finally closed to all traffic in 1965. The line included a viaduct across Ferry Bridge. Over the last 150 years there have been a number of proposals to build a line from Weymouth to Bridport running the length of Chesil Beach. A line was built from Upwey to Abbotsbury but could not be continued through lack of money. A line was also built from Maiden Newton to Bridport and then onwards to West Bay. A more recent proposal was to build a light railway between Weymouth and West Bay.

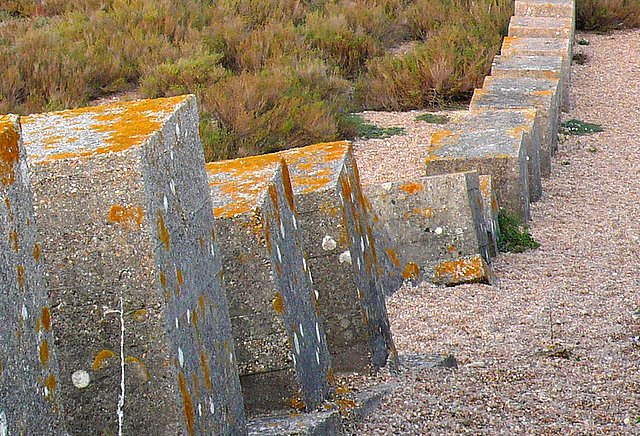
Anti-tank defences at Abbotsbury.

A rifle range, built around 1907, is situated on Chesil Beach, near Ferry Bridge. It had 100 yard increments up to 800 yards, and some remains of this structure can still be seen today. The Royal Navy operated a minesweeping trials range off West Bexington for many years following World War II. It was abandoned in the mid-1980s. The cables came ashore under the beach at the West Bexington car park, and today the range control building can still be seen behind the car park, while one of the theodolite stations is located near the entrance to the Cogden Beach car park.

=== Second World War defences ===
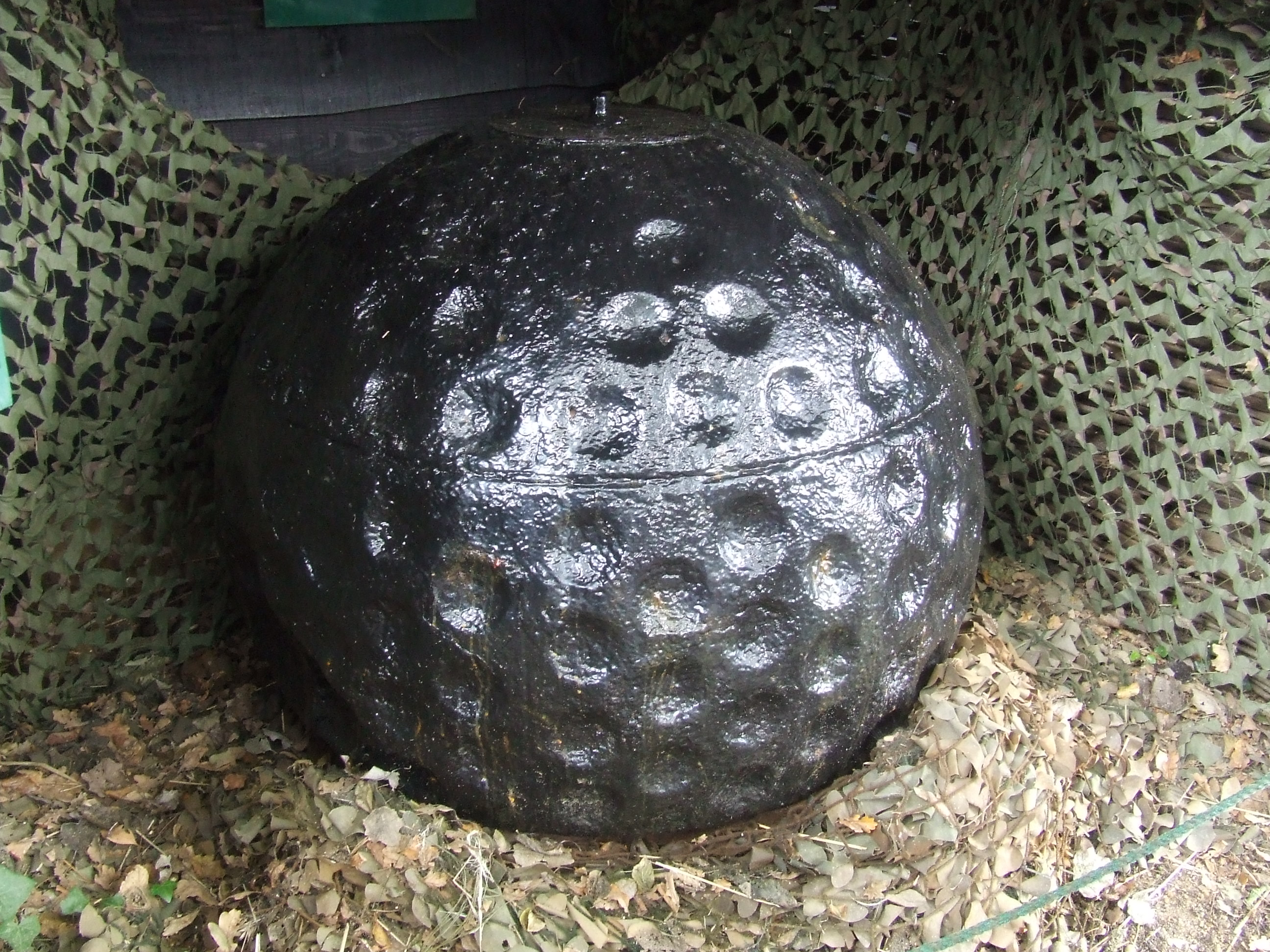
Highball bouncing bomb prototype, now on display at Abbotsbury Swannery

The beach and the Fleet were used as an experimental bombing range by the Royal Air Force before and during World War II because of the low population density of nearby areas, as well as their proximity to the naval base on Portland. The beach was also used for machine gun training and Highball bouncing bomb testing during the war.

A double row of anti-tank blocks divides the beach near Abbotsbury, where the Fleet lagoon begins. Most of the seaward blocks have been destroyed, but the parallel lines of blocks on the landward side still survive in good condition. Within the same spot are two remaining Type 26 pillboxes. They were constructed in 1940 and were situated within the Abbotsbury defence area. An anti-tank ditch was located within this area behind Chesil Beach. An observation post still exists on the landward side of the Fleet, with the open front facing Chesil Beach.

The portion of the beach to the east of the anti-tank division in front of Fleet had no passive defences against a landing, whereas the beach to the west was protected with miles of Admiralty scaffolding, with anti-tank ditches and minefields and flame fougasse installations a little farther inland.

== The Fleet (lagoon) ==
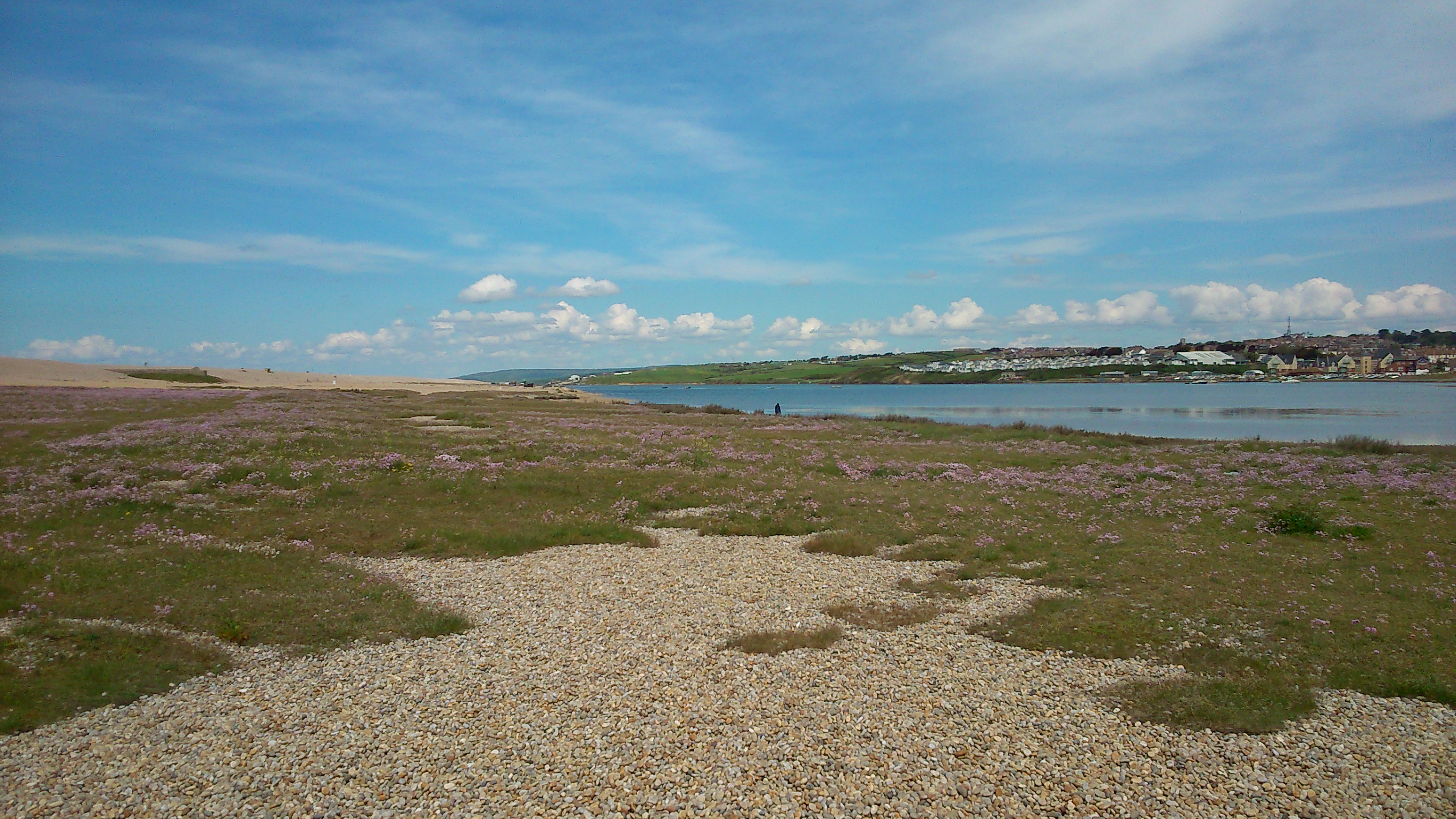
Chesil Beach and the Fleet

From West Bay to Cliff End the beach is piled up against the cliff. At Cliff End a hollow forms behind the beach and at Abbotsbury a stretch of saline (or brackish) water called the Fleet lagoon begins. This is up to 3m in depth. The Fleet is home to many wading birds and Abbotsbury Swannery, and fossils can be found in the sand and mud. The Fleet connects to Portland Harbour at Ferry Bridge. Initially a ferry boat was used to connect Portland to the mainland, until the first bridge was constructed in 1839. An iron bridge replaced this in 1896, and this was in turn replaced with a concrete bridge in 1985.

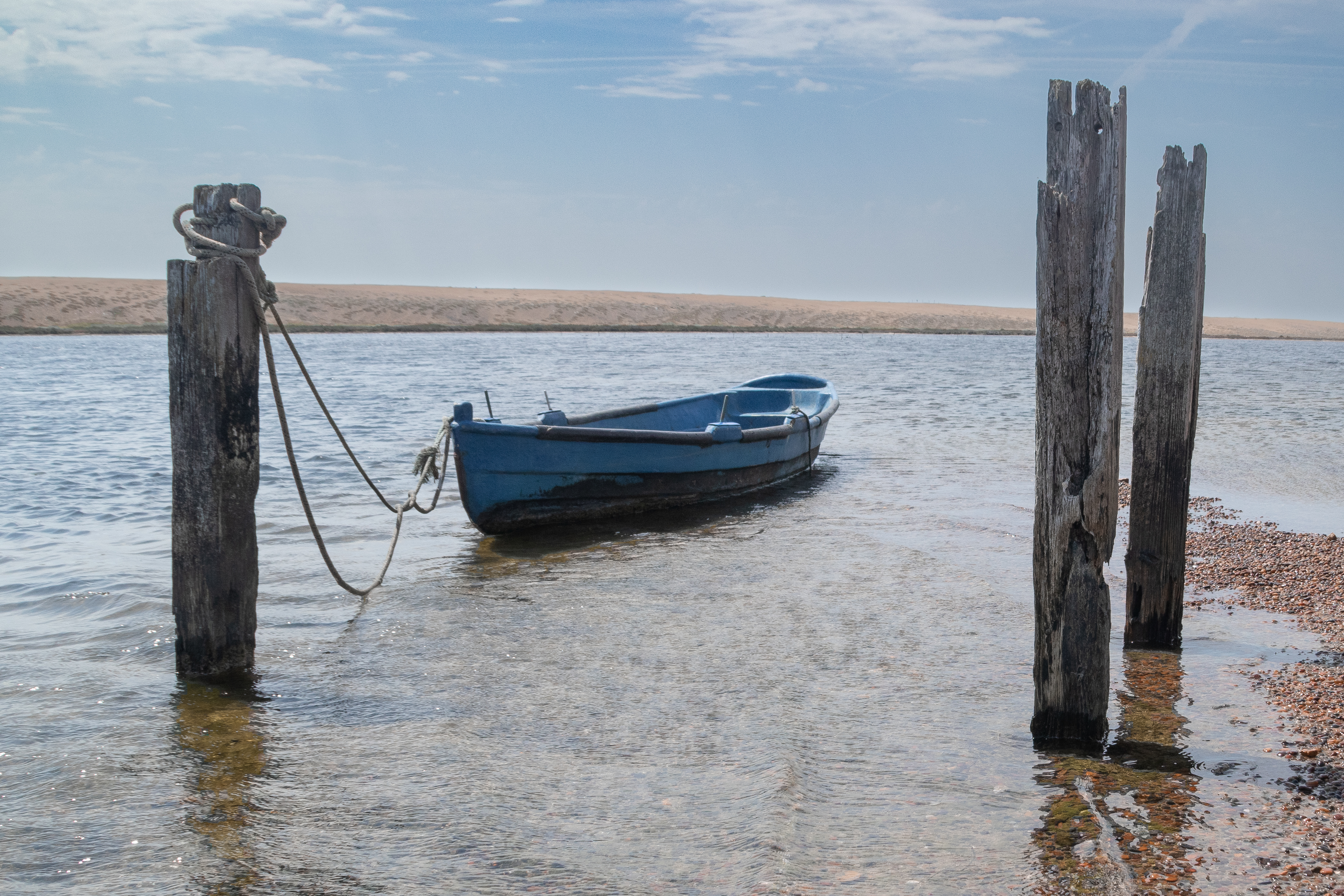
West Fleet, Chesil Beach

Both Chesil Beach and the Fleet are a Site of Special Scientific Interest, and the view of the beach from Abbotsbury has been voted by Country Life magazine as Britain's third best view.

An arrangement of nets and poles to lure ducks into a closed area of netting is a duck decoy located within Abbotsbury Swannery. It was originally installed to provide food for the local monks, but is now used to catch ducks for ringing. It may be the oldest surviving decoy in England. Located in the Upper Fleet, within Abbotsbury Swannery, is Bum Point, and adjacent to this is an artificial island known as Tern Island, which was created to provide a nesting site for common terns.

The lagoon is a designated bass nursery area, and the species are frequently seen on an underwater camera connected to the Chesil Beach Visitor Centre. Accordingly, angling for the fish is only permitted in the lower Fleet area, from the Narrows to Ferrybridge, and only from the shore and even this has been discouraged by the Southern-IFCA (Inshore Fisheries and Conservation Authority) as a conservation measure. A shallow draft boat, named the Fleet Observer, featuring a transparent bottom, takes visitors around the lower Fleet to observe the wildlife above and below the water.

The main site of the Wyke Regis Training Area is found to the west of the Wyke Regis village, where it lies on the north side of the Fleet. This site, a bridging camp, was constructed in 1928 by Royal Engineers. Since then the site has been in continuous use for the training of Royal Engineers, amongst other armed forces, including both regular and reserve forces in the construction of both bridges and ferries, along with other types of military training. The Bridging Camp's inner training area allows Sappers to hone their skills on everything from raft building to familiarising themselves with state of the art weaponry. Due to the close proximity of the lagoon, water based training is held there.

A commercial oyster farm is situated on the sandbanks on the north side of the lower Fleet. The species farmed is the Pacific oyster, rather than the local oyster, and the farm racks are always visible at low tide.

At Seabarn, a 68-metre-high (223 ft) hill located in the mid-Fleet, between Butterstreet Cove and Herbury, is a disused control tower and landing pad for the navy helicopter firing range in Lyme Bay. The range was closed when the Navy left Portland in 1995. There are also the remains of an anti-aircraft battery from the Second World War.

Fossils occur all along the landward shore of the Fleet and along the landward side of Chesil Beach from Abbotsbury to West Bay. The main site is at Burton Bradstock.

== Ecology and conservation ==
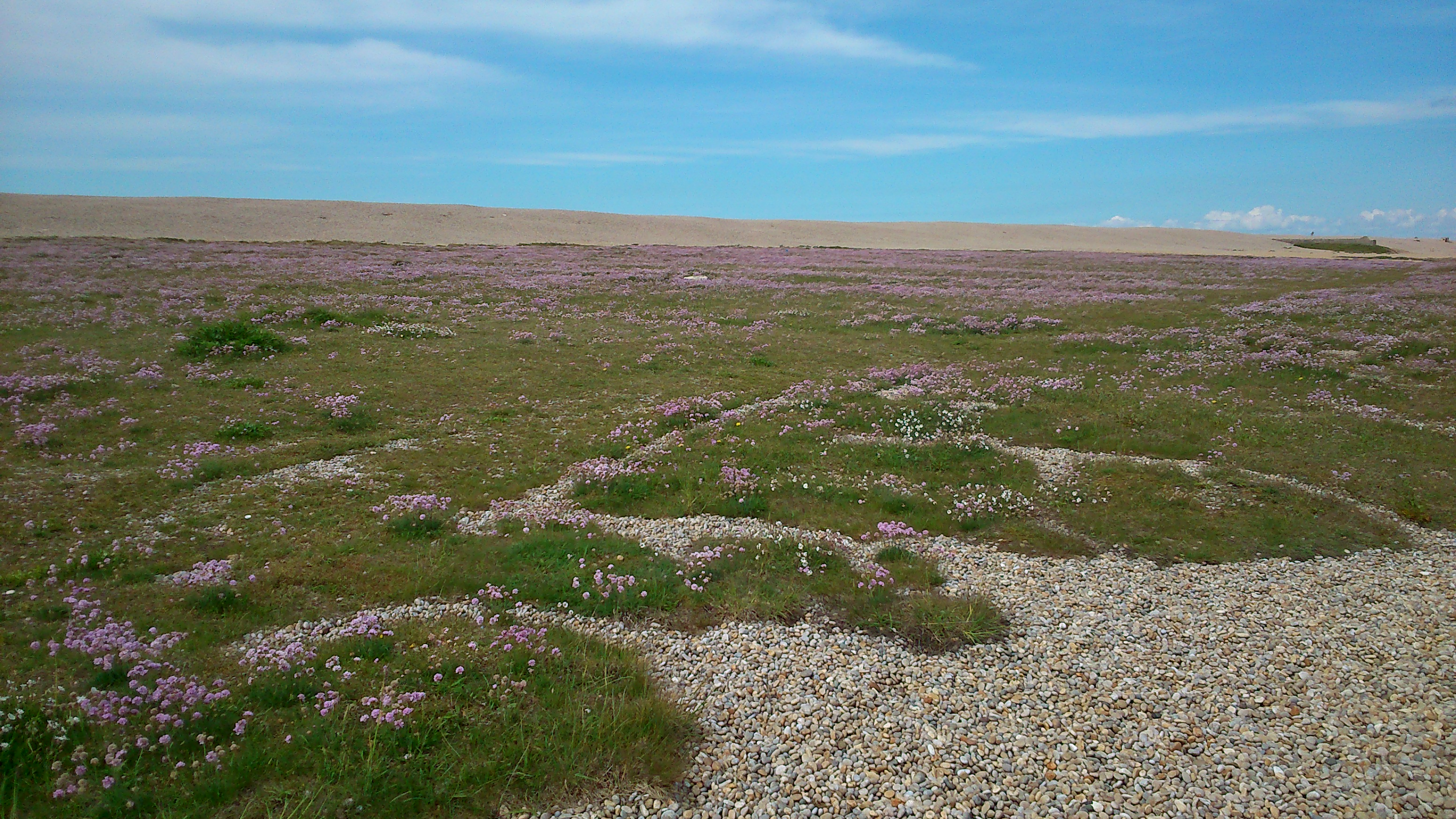
Flora of Chesil Beach

Chesil & The Fleet is a Site of Special Scientific Interest (SSSI), which is also designated as a Special Area of Conservation, a Special Protection Area for birds, and a Ramsar Site. Owners of the land designated SSSI include the Crown Estate, the Ministry of Defence and the National Trust.

Due to the bird nesting season from 1 April until the end of August, access along, and to all parts of the beach from the Portland boundary stone to Abbotsbury is not permitted. Additionally access to the Fleet slope of the beach from Wyke to Abbotsbury is not permitted at any time in effort to protect and conserve the delicate environment. The Upper Fleet has some parts restricted to protect sensitive habitats.

The little egret, Egretta garzetta, once a rare visitor to the UK, but is now regularly seen along the shores of the Fleet. The scaly cricket, a small insect, is only found at three sites in the UK, including Chesil Beach. Two species of eelgrass are found in the Fleet: Zostera marina and Zostera noltii. These species both grow submerged in the shallow waters of the mid and upper Fleet, where large quantities die off in the early autumn.

Chesil Beach is a popular location for sea angling, with access at Chiswell, Ferry Bridge, Abbotsbury, Cogden, Burton Bradstock and West Bay. Angling is also allowed in the lower Fleet from the shore. Commercial fishing, which often involved seine nets, has now virtually disappeared from Chesil Beach compared with the level of activity a century ago. Within the Fleet there is still a small controlled fishery for eels using fyke nets. The grey mullet is a common fish of the Fleet, occurring in large numbers along its entire length.

In 1971, the Japanese seaweed, Sargassum muticum, arrived in Britain, where it first appeared in the Isle of Wight. However, in the following years it spread along the south coast to the Fleet. It soon dominated the environment despite a number of attempts to limit its impact. It has since died back to a much lower level of occupancy in the Narrows and lower Fleet, however the current amount of growth is often dependent on a number of factors and as such varies from year to year.

Due to issue with litter, both natural and man-made, brought to the beach by south-westerly gales, regular litter picks are organised, which involves volunteers to help alleviate the problem. A boom is in place at Ferry Bridge to minimise the impact on the Fleet of any oil pollution from within Portland Harbour.

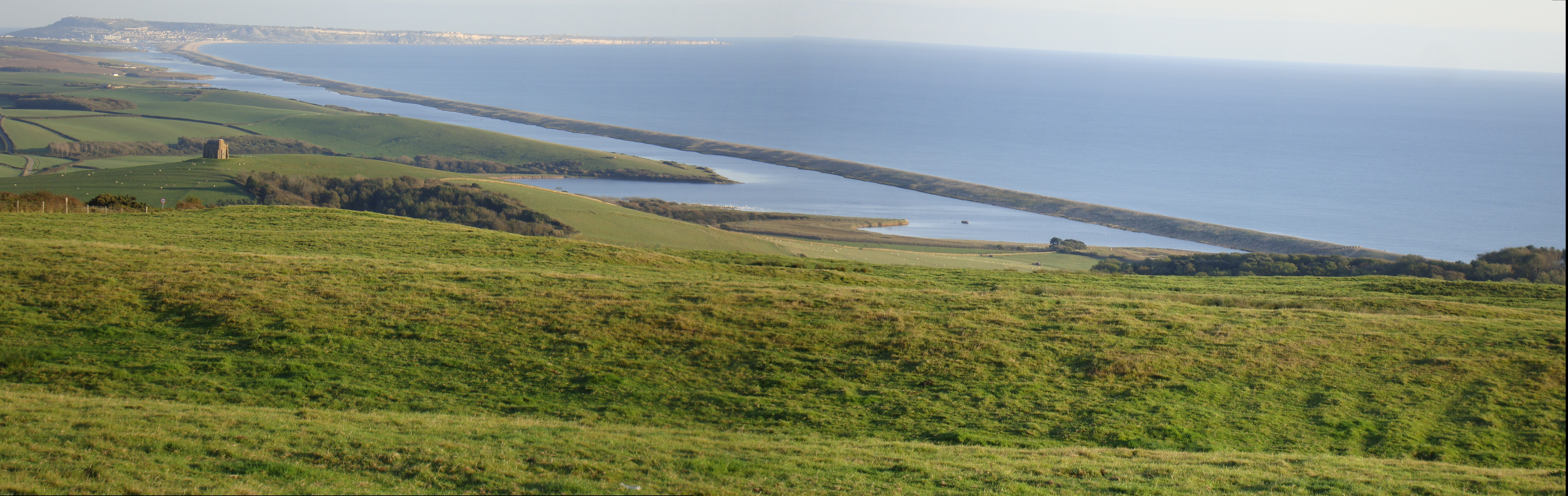
Chesil Beach, the Fleet and the Isle of Portland, from the north-west over Abbotsbury

== In popular culture ==
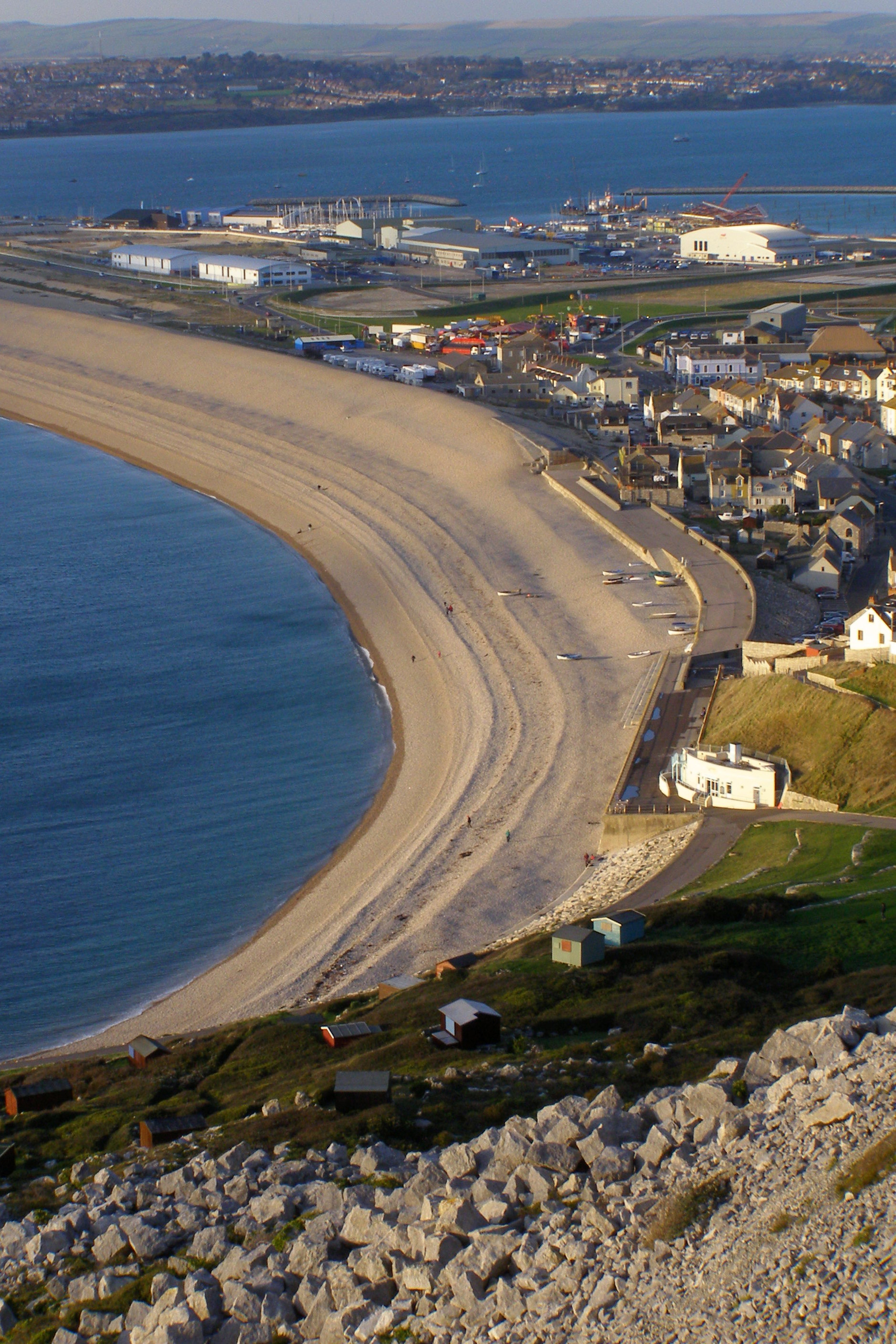
Chesil Cove at the Portland end of Chesil Beach

In the novel The Well-Beloved: A Sketch of a Temperament by Thomas Hardy he calls Chesil Beach Deadman's Bay. The Fleet and Chesil Beach feature in the novel Moonfleet by J. Meade Falkner (1898), in which the village of Moonfleet is based on the real village of Fleet. Despite being the setting for the novel, it was not used as a location for the film adaptation Moonfleet (1954) which was filmed entirely in Hollywood, California.

Ian McEwan's Booker Prize nominated novel On Chesil Beach is, primarily, set in a hotel overlooking Chesil Beach. In the final sections of the book, there are scenes on Chesil Beach itself. This was adapted into a 2017 film of the same name.

The cover of the 1980 UK single "Echo Beach" by Martha and the Muffins was based on Chesil Beach.

Chesil Beach: a Peopled Solitude (2021) by Judith Stinton is a non-fiction account of the history of Chesil Beach.

Chesil Beach and the Fleet have been used as a location in films including The Dam Busters (1955), The Damned (1963), On Chesil Beach (2017), and The Sands Of Summers Past (2017), as well as being the setting for the climax of The Small Back Room (1949).

== See also ==
- Gore Cove
- The Cove House Inn
