= Church of Our Lady and St Andrew, Portland =

Former church in Dorset, England

Coordinates: 50.5513°N 2.4288°W

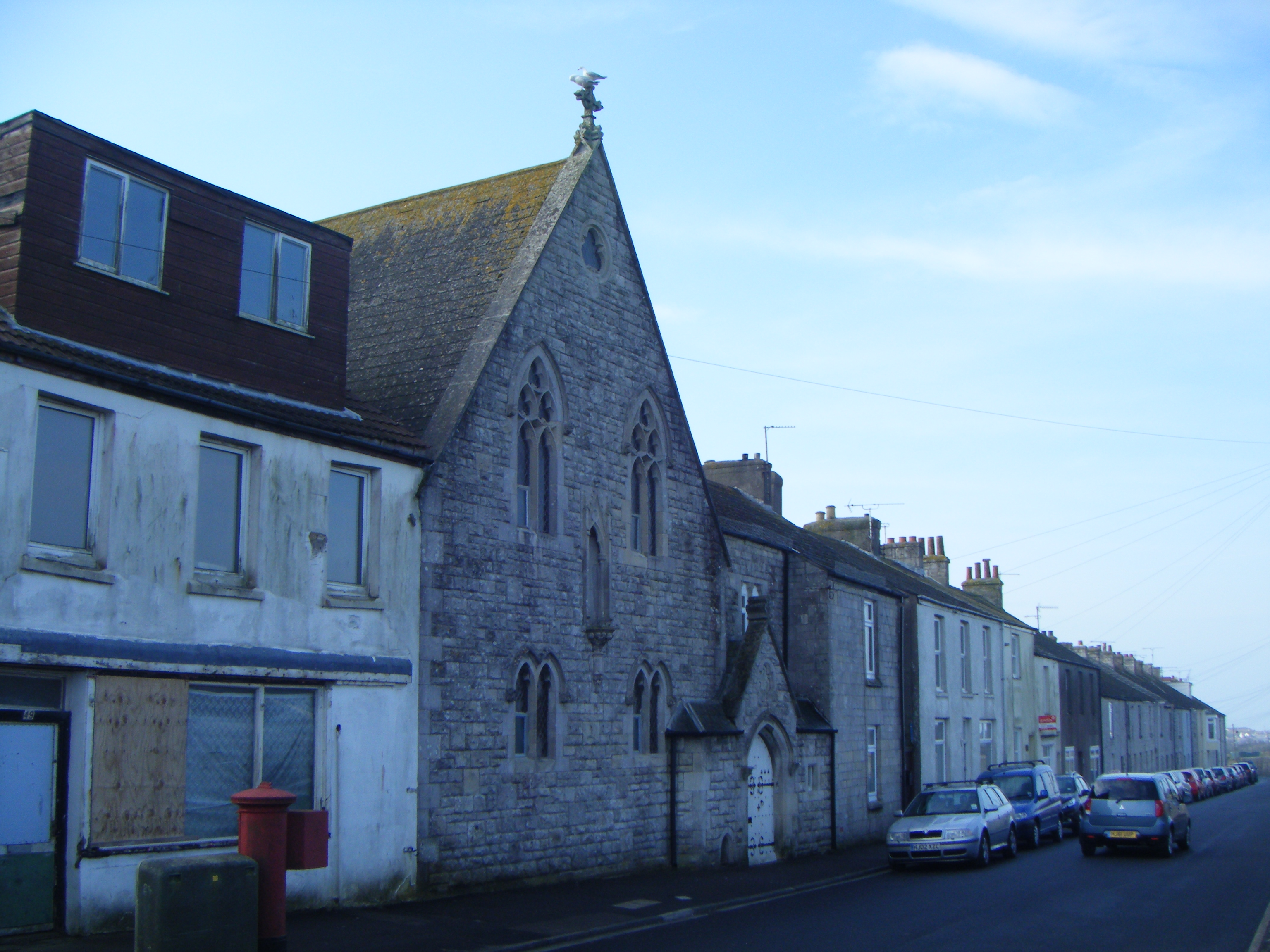
Church of Our Lady and St Andrew. The building to the left was once the Grove Post Office and General Store.

Church of Our Lady and St Andrew is a former Roman Catholic church in The Grove, on the Isle of Portland, Dorset. The church is now in private ownership.

== History ==
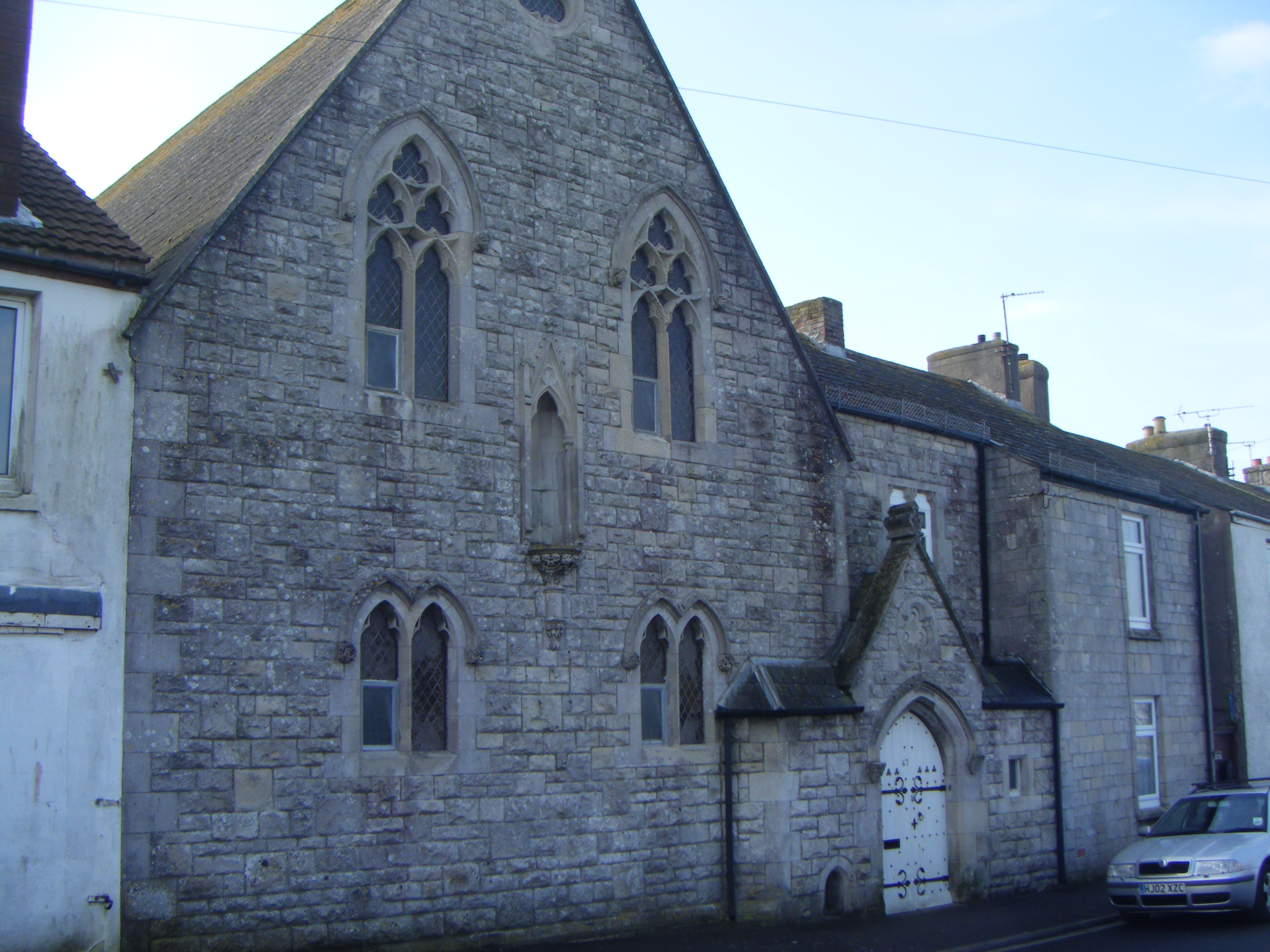
Church of Our Lady and St Andrew.

During the 19th-century, the influx of workers for the new prison establishment, and the construction of the breakwaters of Portland Harbour, led to the need for a Catholic church. Designed by the prolific English architect Joseph Hansom, the church was erected at Grove Road in 1868 by George Poole, and dedicated to Our Lady and St Andrew. George Poole became the first Priest in Charge, while the longest serving priest was its sixth - Walter Keily - who served between 1881-1930. There would be eighteen priests serving the church from its opening to closure in total, with two assistant priests operating at separate times from 1868 to 1873, when Poole was the parish priest.

From the late 19th century and into the 20th century, the church's main offering revolved around two Sunday services. Sailors would have a service at 9 am, whilst another would follow immediately after at 10:30 am for the military and civilians. Right from the opening of the church, it proved a valuable establishment for the community as well as to the various Regiments in Garrison and the Royal Navy. It was supported and used by the community right up until the end of the 20th century, including Portland's three prisons - HM Prison The Verne, HM Prison Weare, and the Young Offender's Institution.

The church's future remained uncertain until 2008 when Christopher Budd, Bishop of Plymouth, decreed that the parishes of Our Lady & St Andrew, Portland, St Augustine, Weymouth and St Joseph, Weymouth, be united to form a new parish, Our Lady Star of the Sea. The Church of Our Lady and St Andrew would then be subsequently sold around 2011.
