= Balaclava Bay =

Bay in Dorset, England

Coordinates: 50.5665°N 2.4267°W

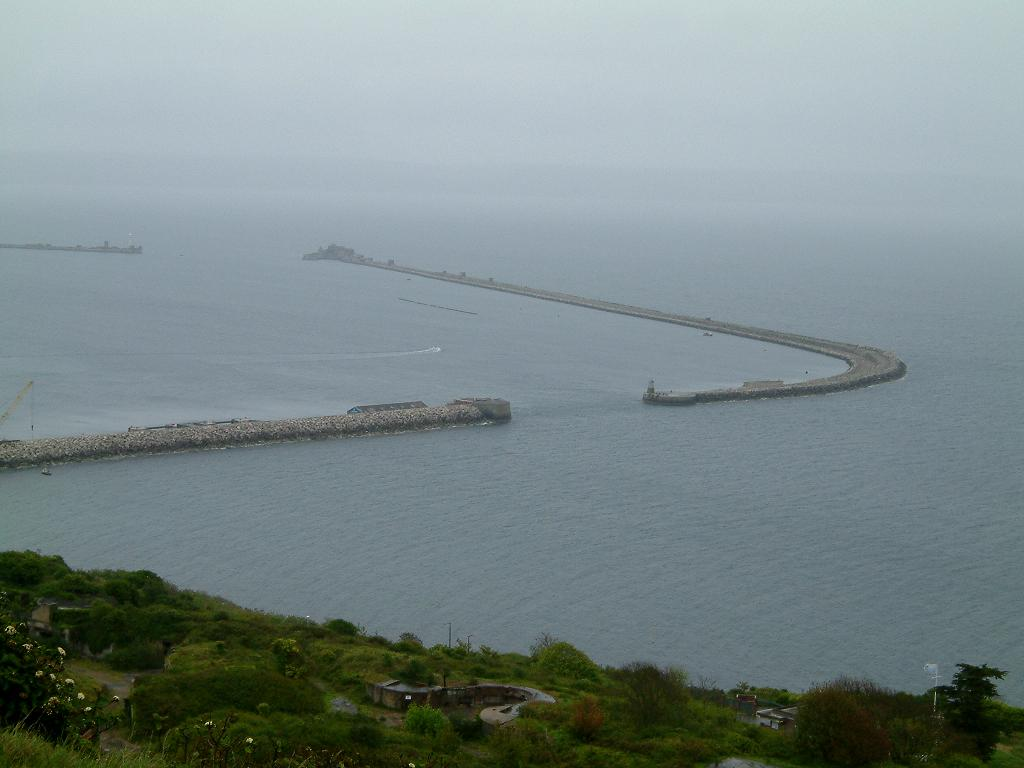
View northeast across Balaclava Bay from the Isle of Portland towards the southern and eastern entrances of Portland Harbour. The dark colour of the water between the two breakwaters is the position a scuttled battleship, HMS Hood.

Balaclava Bay is a bay situated on the edge of Portland Harbour, where the breakwater meets the island, at the northern end of the Isle of Portland, Dorset, in southern England. The bay is overlooked by the Victorian East Weare Battery, built in the 1860s to protect the harbour. The nearest road within the dockyard of Portland Port is named Balaclava Road.

== Background ==
The bay was created in Victorian times by the construction of the inner breakwater at Portland Harbour. The bay is within the boundary of Portland Port, and is accessible by kayaks and boats, while divers often use the bay. One wreck, known as the Dredger, lies within the sheltered bay.

In January 2010, Weymouth and Portland Borough Council passed plans for a power station at Portland Port, which was to generate electricity by burning palm oil from Indonesia. The power station was due to be situated at Balaclava Bay. The company W4B were unable to finance the plant. The plant plan received much objection from local citizens, and saw the formation of the protest organisation "No Oil Palm Energy" (NOPE).

During the Second World War a number of anti-invasion structures were placed at Balaclava Bay, constructed between 1940 and 1941. An anti boat landing obstacle was laid offshore, compromising of a line of stone boulders. On the shore a minefield was laid, using mine 'B', type 'C', forming part of the Dorset coast defences and the Isle of Portland defences. It had been cleared by 1946. A little further south was a coast artillery searchlight. Another coast artillery searchlight, constructed during 1940–41, was situated further south of this.
