= Portland Breakwater Fort =

Coordinates: 50.5849°N 2.4141°W

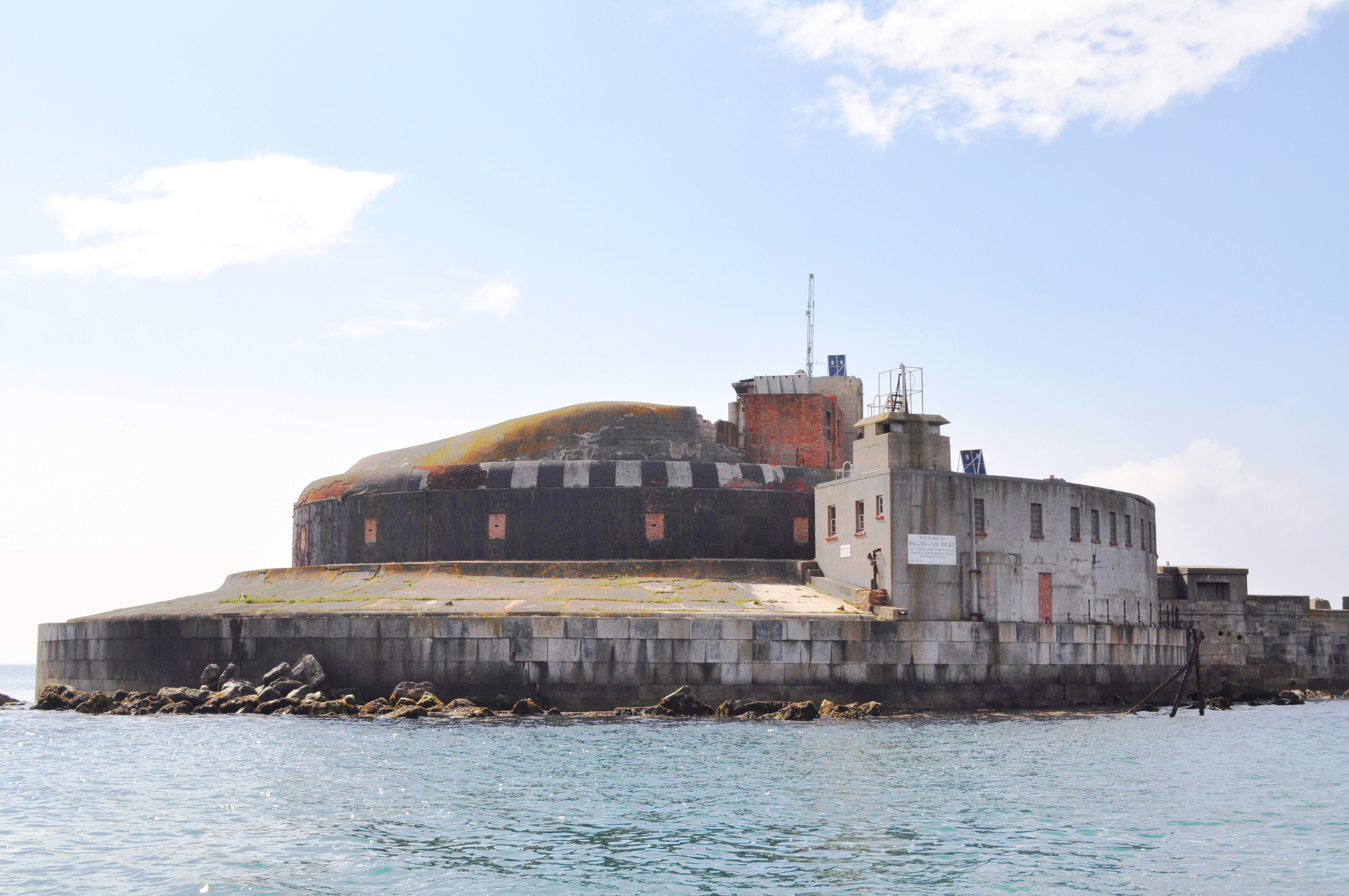
Portland Breakwater Fort

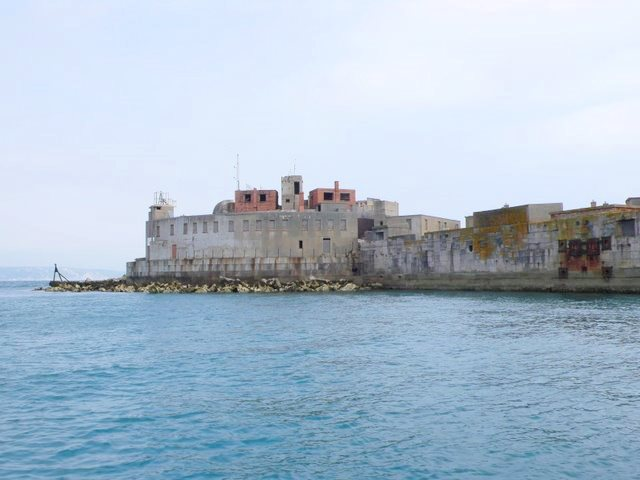
Portland Breakwater Fort

The Portland Breakwater Fort is a 19th-century fort, built between 1868-1875 to defend Portland Harbour, Dorset, England. It is located on the outer breakwater of the harbour and has been Grade II Listed since 1978. The fort is not open to the public and remains derelict. On the opposite side of the next stretch of the breakwater is the Portland Breakwater Lighthouse.

== History and design ==
Designed by Captain E. H. Steward of the Royal Engineers, the circular fort was first planned in 1859. It was built as a result of the Royal Commission to guard the new Portland harbour and Royal Navy institutions on the island. Due to subsidence, the fort was constructed on a granite base, based on a 200-foot (61 m) diameter ring of stone laid down on the seabed. The main floor consists of gun rooms and ports for 14 heavy guns. Below the gun floor are the shell and cartridge stores and engine rooms. The fort also has its own harbour and ancillary barrack buildings. The fort cost £75,968 to build.

In 1892, the fort was installed with seven 12.5-inch RML cannons, and these were replaced in 1907 by two 6-inch BL guns and two 12-pounder QF guns. During World War I, it was armed with two 6-inch BL Mk. VII guns. During World War II, the fort was used as an examination battery. It was reduced to care and maintenance by 1945 and abandoned in 1956. For decades, remains of a cut up 12 inch R.M.L. cannon can be seen out of the water.

In 1995, the Dorset Sculpture Trust attempted to gain a grant from the Millennium Fund to turn the site into an arts centre. In 2005, BBC Spotlight's Jonathan Hudston had an exclusive tour of the fort. At the time, it was estimated that it would take £10 million to repair the fort for commercial use, and that it was not a priority for the owners, Portland Port Ltd.
