= East Weare Camp =

Military building in Dorset, England

Coordinates: 50.5621°N 2.4296°W

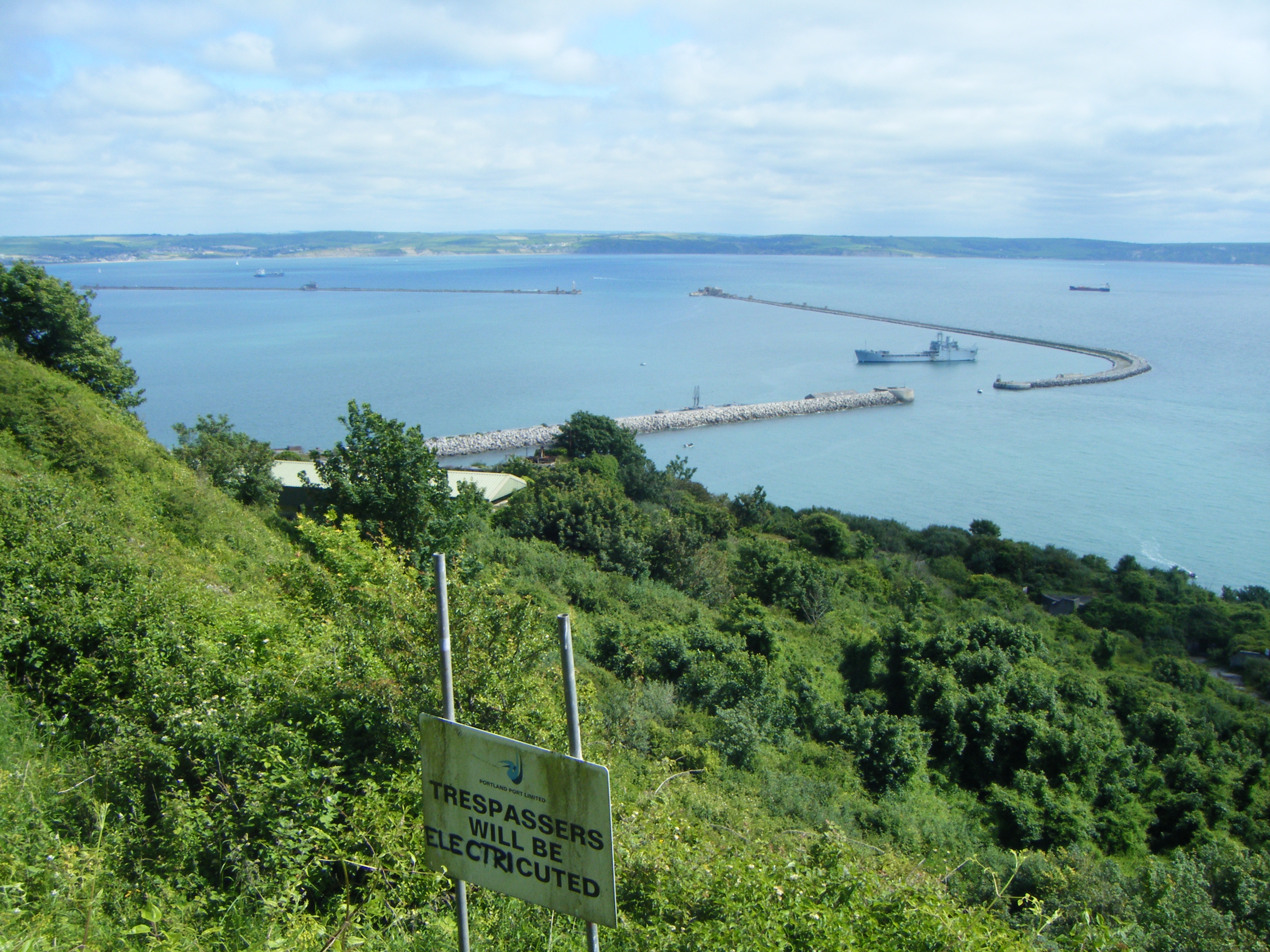
The non-original green rooftop of East Weare Camp, seen from the boundary fencing of the port.

East Weare Camp is a former 19th-century detention barracks on the Isle of Portland in Dorset, England. It is located at East Weares, overlooking Portland Harbour and East Weare Battery. The camp became Grade II Listed in 1978. Both East Weare Battery and East Weare Camp remain on the private property of Portland Port Ltd, and have not been opened to the public.

East Weare Camp was built around 1880 as a detention barracks for military service personnel stationed at the Verne Citadel. The barracks was accessed from the citadel by a sally port and zig-zag route, which also gave troops access to the battery below the camp. Later in 1914, part of the camp was converted to coastguard use.

Today, the buildings, like the battery below, have become dilapidated and are subject to undergrowth and vandalism. The camp and battery have remained closed to the public, despite published reports in 1996 of Portland Port Ltd's intentions for possible renovation of historic coastal fortifications in the area.
