= HM Prison Portland =

Prison in Dorset, England

HMP Portland
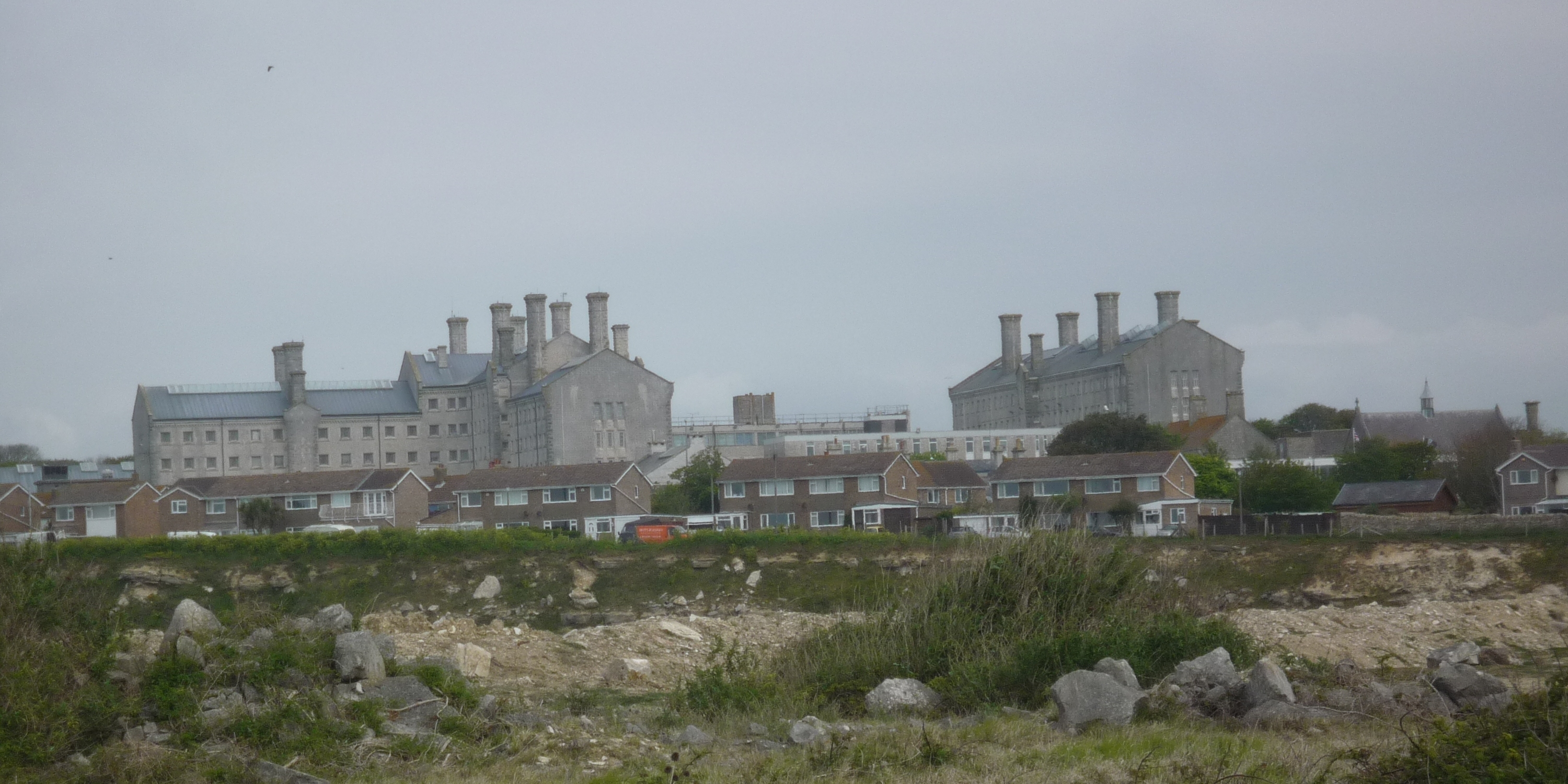
- Interactive map of HMP Portland
- Location: The Grove, Portland, Dorset; 50.5502°N 2.4226°W
- Security class: Young offender institution
- Population: 505 (June 2018)
- Opened: 1848
- Managed by: HM Prison Service
- Governor: Pete Lewis
- Website: Portland at justice.gov.uk

HM Prison Portland is a male adult prison and young offender institution in the village of The Grove on the Isle of Portland, in Dorset, England. It is operated by His Majesty's Prison Service. The prison was originally opened in 1848 as an adult convict establishment, before becoming a Borstal in 1921, and a YOI in 1988. In 2011 it became an adult and young offender establishment.

== History ==
Portland's prison opened in 1848 for the holding of adult convicts. The purpose of a prison at Portland was largely to make use of convict labour in the construction of the breakwaters of Portland Harbour and its various defences. The first convicts, totalling 64, arrived aboard the HM Steamer Driver on 21 November. The Admiralty Quarries were developed for convicts to work in and once established, convict labour was providing 10,000 tons of stone per week for use on the breakwaters. The conditions within both the prison and its quarries throughout the 19th-century would later help calls for penal reform in the UK, as many prisoners died while quarrying stone.

From the moment of the prison's inception, the convicts became a tourist attraction. The village of the Grove had been developed directly due to the prison, and a number of homeowners decided to open cafes from the upstairs of their houses for tourists to watch the convicts at work. In 1869 the government announced that the prison, which was originally intended to be temporary, would become a permanent establishment. Although local residents petitioned against this, it did not deter the government's plans. Between 1870 and 1872, convicts constructed the now-redundant, Grade II* Listed St. Peter's Church just outside the prison.

In 1921 the prison was converted into a Borstal. Between 1931 and 1935, the Borstal Boys transformed a disused convict quarry into a sports stadium at the back of St. Peter's Church. The first sports day took place on 1 August 1936, while the last event spectated by the public was the Foundation Day Sports event of 1975. During World War II, an air raid on 15 August 1940 saw the Borstal's Rodney House block bombed. This left four boys dead and others severely injured, including five being admitted to hospital. In 1983, the Borstal changed to Youth Custody Centre.

In 1988 the prison was re-rolled as a Young Offenders Institution (YOI, Portland), holding up to 519 young males aged 18 to 21. Accommodation at the prison was divided into seven blocks, Benbow, Raleigh, Drake, Nelson, Grenville, Collingwood and Beaufort. In 2009, the prison was the setting for Ian Wright's Football Behind Bars, a Sky1 reality TV series showcasing Wright's work to transform the lives of 24 serious young offenders. It was based on socialising the young men by organising them in a football academy.

In April 2011 the prison became an Adult/Young Offenders establishment. In late 2013, it was announced that it would also be one of a number of resettlement prisons across the UK. This news coincided with the recent decision to turn HM Prison The Verne, another prison on Portland, into an immigration removal centre. In 2010, with the assistance of the prison, a community project was completed to restore the Governor's Community Garden and open it to the public. Around 2011, at the Verne, the Jailhouse Cafe was opened to the public, which was created to reduce re-offending and to offer prisoners work experience. When the Verne was converted to an Immigration Removal Centre in early 2014, the cafe has continued by using prisoners from the YOI.

== YOI Inspection reports ==
In March 2000, an inspection report by His Majesty's Chief Inspector of Prisons severely criticised conditions at Portland YOI, including foul-smelling toilets and filthy showers. There were also complaints of rats in food service areas lodged by inmates. Just over a month later, prison officials were forced to extract 26 prisoners who had for eight hours used furniture to barricade themselves away from their cells.

In November 2004, a report from the Chief Inspector of Prisons highlighted racial tension, and distrust between Muslim inmates and staff at Portland Prison. The report also criticised the fact that inmates were still slopping out, because of poor sanitation facilities at the institute.

A further report in June 2007 following an unannounced inspection heavily criticised conditions at Portland YOI. The report stated that some buildings "were unfit for purpose and lacked basic sanitation", with the continued practice of inmates without access to toilet facilities using buckets which they emptied through their windows. The report criticised other elements of the prison, including opportunities provided to prisoners for physical activity and training, but indicated that the situation was better in Portland than it had been in 2004 at the time of the last inspection.

== Grove Prison Museum ==
In late 2013, it was announced by local news that a museum would be opened to cover the history of HM Prison Portland. The Grove Prison Museum opened in March 2014, through the work of retired officers John Hutton, Steve Ashford and Chris Hunt. The museum is based in the former deputy governor's residence, across the road from the main prison entrance. The idea for a museum had dated back over 20 years, when it was agreed to store some prison memorabilia items for a possible future museum. These were left untouched for 20 years in storage.

South Dorset MP Richard Drax visited the deputy governor's building to officially open the prison museum and the Lighthouse Learning Centre. A year after the museum's opening, it was announced that over 1000 visitors had been to the museum.

== Grade listed features ==
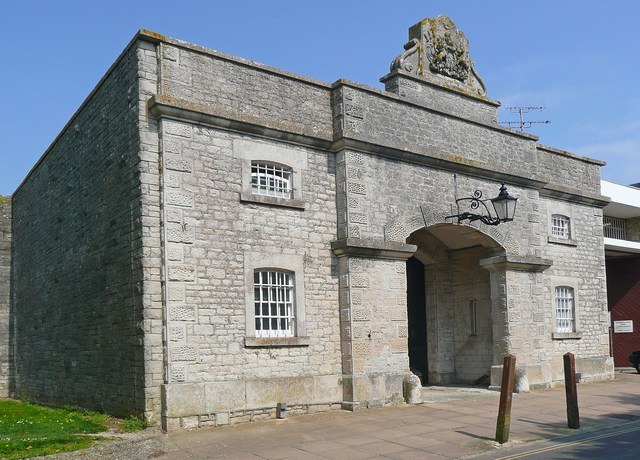
The gatehouse

Various features of the prison have been listed. In September 1978, the gatehouse, including the attached VR letter box, became Grade II Listed. In May 1993, both the east and west cell blocks became Grade II Listed. At the same time, the E Hall, a prison cell block with attached punishment block from 1848, became Grade II Listed. The Overseer's Hut with inclines became Grade II Listed in May 1993.

One of the prison and village's most notable features is a high wall running along the village's main road, Grove Road. This boundary wall remains a significant visual element within the village, and was built in the 19th century to enclose the convict quarry workings. The boundary wall has been Grade II Listed since May 1993. The sentry box, along with the gate pier became Grade II Listed in September 1978. The boundary wall, and gate piers, running from St Peter's Vicarage to Alma Terrace, and dating from 1875, was Grade II Listed at the same time as the sentry box. The early 19th century gate piers at the junction with Grove Road, along with the boundary walls to Ivybank and the Vicarage became Grade II Listed at this same time too. In May 1993, the boundary wall west of the prison became Grade II Listed, and this section dates from 1848. The prison's north and east boundary walls have been Grade II Listed since May 1993 as well, dating from 1848 and later.

Alma Terrace, on Grove Road is a terrace of houses, built in 1854, originally as six large houses for prison wardens, was designated Grade II in September 1978. The wash houses and connecting boundary wall to the rear of the terrace has also become Grade II Listed in May 1993. The Governor's House (102 Grove Road), with its front boundary wall, has been Grade II Listed since May 1993. The detached house was formerly the Governor's House to the prison, built around 1850. Additionally the prison itself has various Grade Listed features. The adjoining School House of Grove Infant School, along with the rear boundary wall, became Grade II Listed at the same time.

Grove Lime Kiln lies approximately 320 metres north-west of St Peter's Church. The Grade Listed II structure was designated in January 2009. Still owned by the prison service, the lime kiln remains in a derelict and uncared for state. It was built and once operated by convicts from the prison, and is an important survival and one of the last vestiges of lime production in Portland. At the top of the nearby, private incline road is the abandoned Old Engine Shed that once served the cable-operated inclined railway that ran to Castletown through the Navy Dockyard that is now Portland Port. The shed has been Grade II Listed since January 2001.

== Notable former inmates ==
- Mohammad Amir
- Roy Chubby Brown
- Tom Clarke
- John Daly
- Michael Davitt
- George Edalji
- John Babbacombe Lee
- Jeremiah O'Donovan Rossa
- Charles Wells
- Irving Ampofo Adjei
