= St Peter's Church, Portland =

Church in Dorset, England

Coordinates: 50.5521°N 2.4263°W

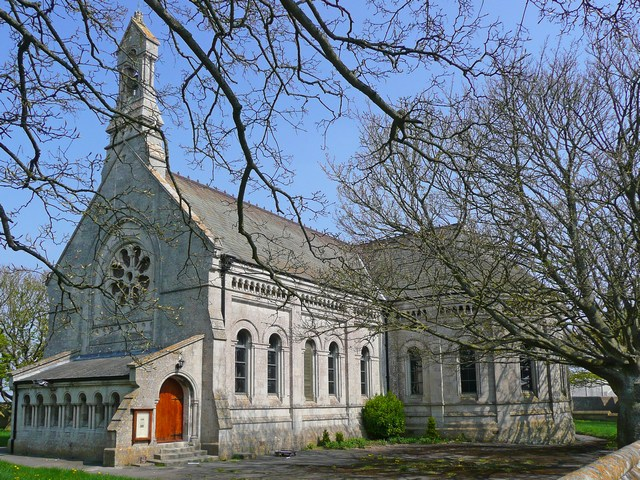
St. Peter's Church

St. Peter's Church is a former Church of England church in The Grove, on the Isle of Portland, Dorset. Designed by Major-General Sir Edmund Du Cane, the church was built in 1870-72 and is now a Grade II* Listed building. The gate piers and boundary walls to the north and west of the church are also Grade II Listed, along with the church's vicarage. St. Peter's Church is included on Historic England's "Heritage at Risk" register.

== History ==
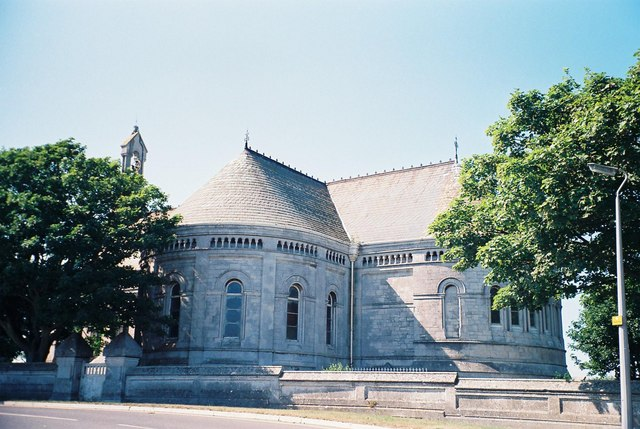
St. Peter's Church in 1996.

St Peter's Church was built between 1870 and 1872, for a cost of £8,000 and using convict labour from the adjacent HM Prison Portland. It was consecrated in August 1872 and used by residents of the Grove and the military garrison stationed at the Verne Citadel. St Peter's became redundant in 1973, but was retained as a chapel for the prison, then a Borstal Institution, until 1988. The church is now in private ownership.

== Design ==
The church is built of Portland stone and has slate roofs. The church, featuring ornate architecture, still maintains many of its original features and is set in walled gardens with mature trees. The stained glass inside dates from the 20th century. During World War II, one of the church's windows suffered bomb damage and was replaced with one dedicated to the memory of Bandmaster J. Tyson and men of the Dorset Regiment killed in action. Within the church is a mosaic, bordering around the porch and chancel, which was the work of female convicts, including Constance Kent, who was serving a life sentence in HM Prison Parkhurst. In the 1972 book The Buildings of England, authors Newman and Pevsner stated "St Peter is in its own way as surprising and as bold in scale as St George's Church, Reforne, Easton."
