= The Grove, Portland =

Village in Dorset, England

Coordinates: 50.551998°N 2.425982°W

Grove
- Location within Dorset
- OS grid reference: SY690721
- Unitary authority: Dorset
- Ceremonial county: Dorset
- Region: South West
- Country: England
- Sovereign state: United Kingdom
- Post town: PORTLAND
- Postcode district: DT5 1
- Dialling code: 01305
- Police: Dorset
- Fire: Dorset and Wiltshire
- Ambulance: South Western
- UK Parliament: South Dorset

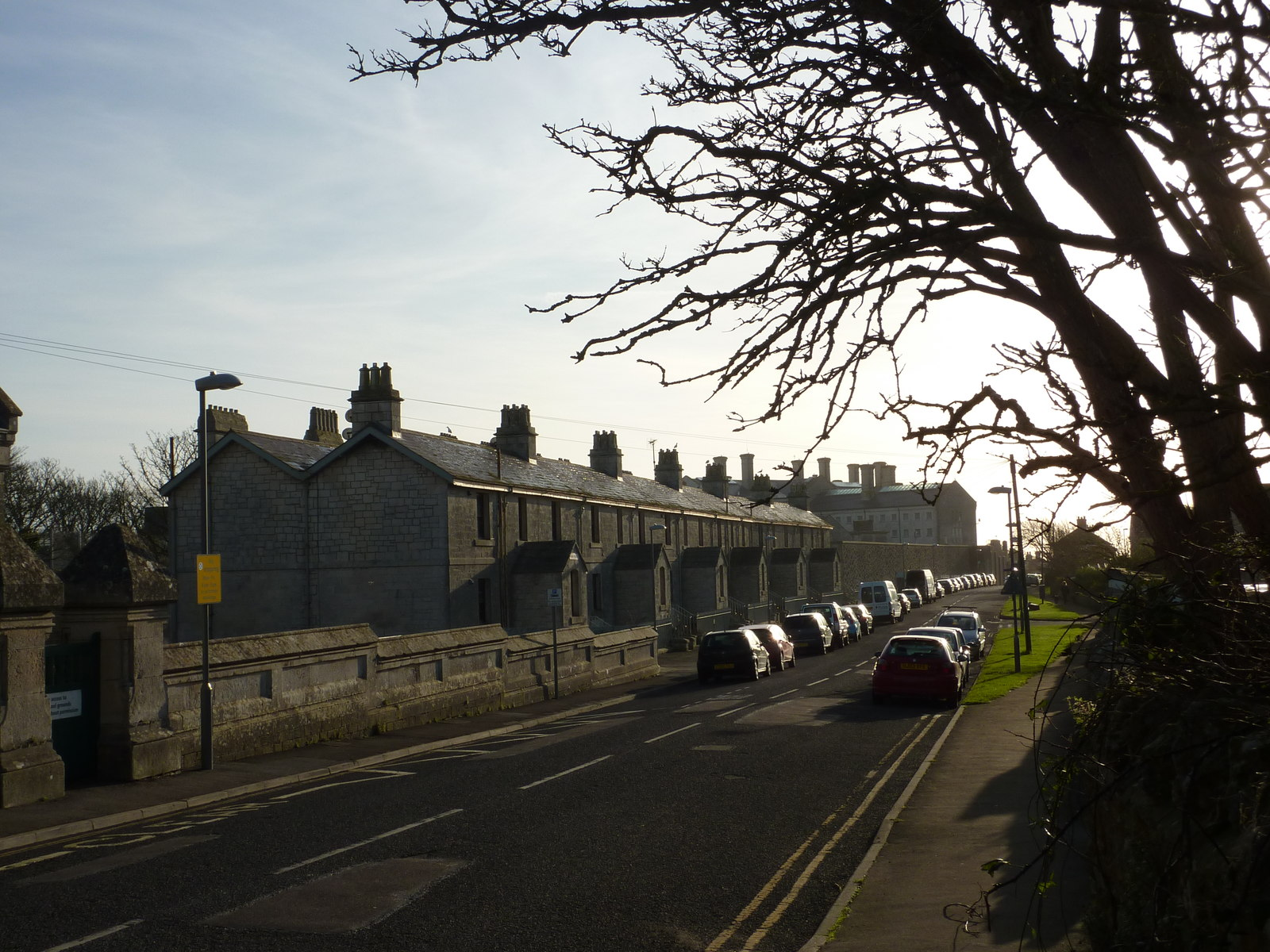
Grove Road with the Young Offenders Institution in the background.

The Grove is a small village located at Tophill on the Isle of Portland in Dorset. The village is found close to the larger village Easton, and is most notable for containing the HM Prison Portland, including its museum Grove Prison Museum. As with the rest of Portland's villages and settlements, The Grove has been designated as a conservation area, as it is a place of special architectural and historic interest. The village was designated in 1981.

== History ==
The village developed with the establishment of HM Prison Portland in 1848 and before had no road links or buildings. By the middle of the 19th century, the village's main road, Grove Road, had been established, as a gateway to the prison. The convicts at the prison would provide labour for the building of the breakwaters of Portland Harbour, and a number of surrounding quarries were opened, known as Admiralty Quarries. The convicts soon became a tourist attraction, and a number of homeowners along Grove Road opened cafes from the upstairs of their houses for tourists to watch the convicts at work. After becoming a permanent establishment, the prison was converted into a Borstal in 1921, a Young Offenders Institution in 1988, and in 2011 it became an Adult/Young Offenders establishment.

The end of the First World War saw a need for housing on Portland, and the first council-built houses were in the Grove's Victoria Road, built in 1932. With the outbreak of World War II, Portland was a natural target for German aircraft, due to the importance of island's naval base. During August 1940 the Borstal was hit with four boys left dead, while during the Easter of 1941 three houses in Augusta Road left four dead. The Grove has seen further housing over the second half of the 20th century, one of which is Rufus Way, built over a filled-in quarry. Portland United Football Club began to play their games at Grove Corner since 1921. During the 1990s, the club's original football ground was moved further into the village to provide quarrying access, and an unexploded World War 2 bomb was discovered. This sparked a major evacuation of 4000 people for a 31-hour operation by the Royal Engineers Bomb Disposal Team.

== Features ==
To the north of St Peter's Church is a large sports stadium/field, Grove Sports Stadium, which was converted from a disused quarry during the 1930s for the Borstal. Nearby are the Young Offenders Institution farm buildings, and the Grove Lime Kiln. In 2010, funding of a community project to restore the Governor's Community Garden allowed it to be opened to the public - a garden belonging to the Young Offenders Institution. Broadcroft Quarry lies close to the village and features a working quarry and also a nature reserve mainly for butterflies.

The old Coastguard Lookout at Grove Point is now used by QinetiQ, as MOD Grove Point. The Grove Point building is used in conjunction with a sea range. In a field near Shepherds Croft is a World War II Coastal Defence/Chain Home Low (CD/CHL) radar station. The station, named site M73, was constructed by the British Army to monitor shipping and aircraft during the war. It was opened from 1941 but closed by the end of 1942.

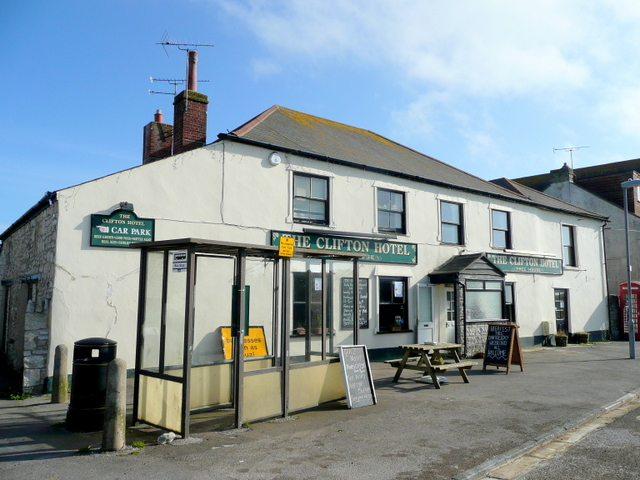
The Clifton Hotel in 2009.

Unlike the majority of Portland's villages, The Grove features very little commercial business and largely consists of housing and the prison. The Grove General Store and Post Office were closed by 2003. The pub remained in business until 2019 when it closed due to a lack of trade.

== Grade listed features ==
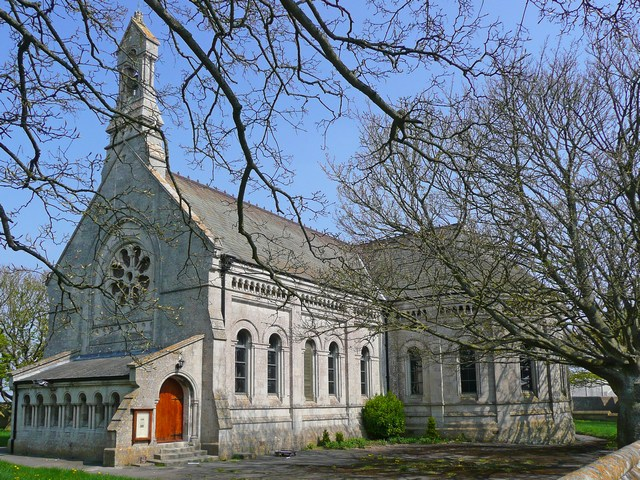
St. Peter's Church

The Grove has a wide array of architecture and buildings, a number of which are Grade Listed.

One of the village's most notable features is a high wall running along the village's main road. This boundary wall was built to enclose the convict quarry workings. In the turning to Incline Road, set in the wall, is an old prison sentry box. The boundary wall, and the sentry box, are both Grade II Listed. The boundary wall, and gate piers, running from St Peter's Vicarage to Alma Terrace, are Grade II Listed. The early 19th century gate piers at the junction with Grove Road, along with the boundary walls to Ivy Bank and the Vicarage are also Grade II Listed. The boundary wall west of the prison is Grade II Listed, along with the prison's north and east boundary walls.

St. Peter's Church was built by convicts, for soldiers stationed at nearby military garrisons. It was completed in 1872, and is Grade II* Listed. The gate piers and boundary walls to the north and west of the church are also Grade II Listed, as is the church vicarage. At Grove Road is the Church of Our Lady and St. Andrew, built in 1868, and closed at the end of the 20th century. The village contains Grove Infant School, which closed in 2014. Originally opened in 1872, it is Grade II* Listed. The adjoining School House, along with the rear boundary wall, is also Grade II Listed.

Alma Terrace was built in 1854, since restored and designated Grade II. The wash houses and connecting boundary wall to the rear is also Grade II Listed. The Governor's House (102 Grove Road), with its front boundary wall, is Grade II Listed, and was formerly the Governor's House to the prison, built around 1850. Additionally the prison itself has various Grade Listed features. Ivy Bank, a detached house on Grove Road, of mid 19th century origin, is Grade II Listed, along with its boundary wall.

Grove Lime Kiln lies approximately 320 metres north-west of St Peter's Church, and is Grade II Listed. Still owned by the prison service, the lime kiln remains in a derelict state. At the top of the nearby incline road is the abandoned Old Engine Shed that once served the cable-operated inclined railway that ran to Castletown. It is also Grade II Listed Within the village are three Victorian ventilator shafts, once used as ventilators to a sewer system. One lies within the Governor's Community Garden, and the other two shafts are found closer to the cliff edge. All three are Grade II Listed monuments. A War Department/Admiralty boundary marker near the gardens is also Grade II Listed.
