= Grove Lime Kiln =

Historical industrial site in Dorset, England

Coordinates: 50.5539°N 2.4299°W

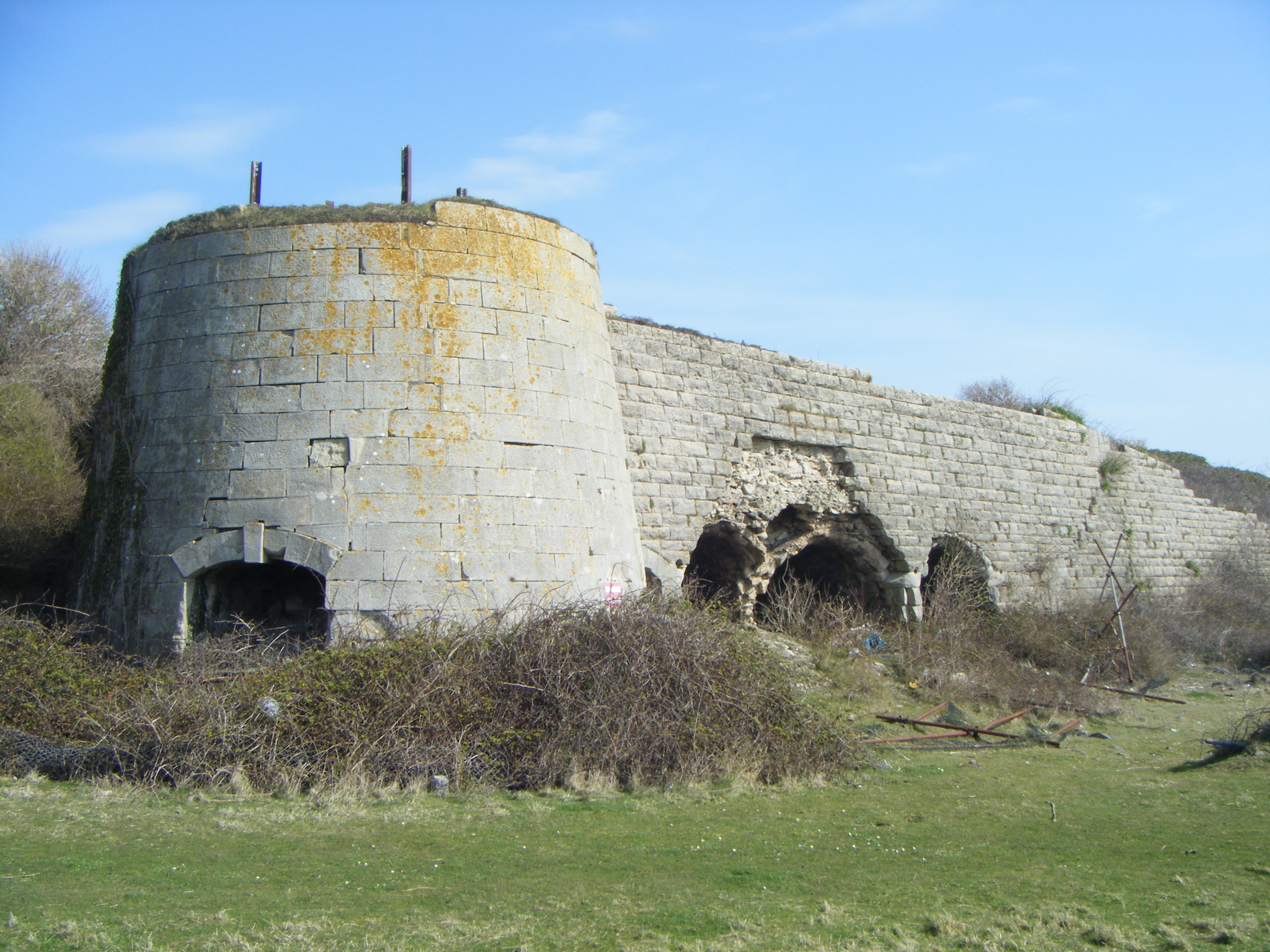
Grove Lime kiln

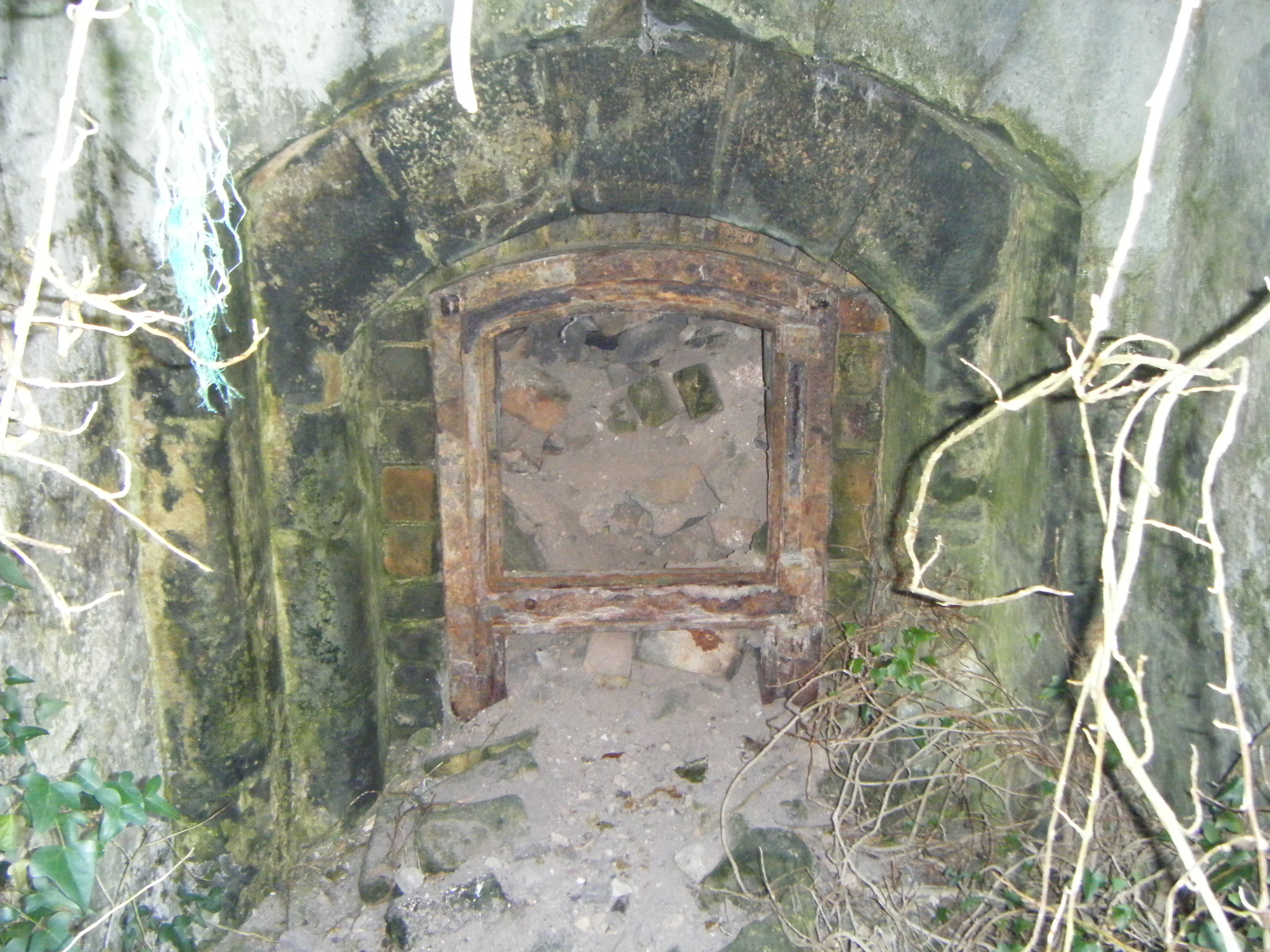
Cast-iron surround to the fire grate.

Grove Lime Kiln is a disused 19th century lime kiln on the Isle of Portland, Dorset, England. It is located close to HM Prison Portland and The Grove village. Owned by the prison service, the lime kiln has been Grade II Listed since 2009.

The Grove Lime kiln is one of a few remaining lime kilns on the island. A 19th-century lime kiln at Easton Lane, now a residence, is another Grade Listed II example. Another kiln is found opposite, while at New Ground, another well-preserved example exists, but is hidden by undergrowth. Finally at Avalanche Road, within the Southwell village, remains another surviving kiln.

== History ==
HM Prison Portland was established in 1848 to provide convict labour within the Admiralty Quarries, which produced the stone for the breakwaters of Portland Harbour. As part of the subsidiary operations within the quarries, Grove Lime kiln was used for lime production and dates from around 1900. It was constructed and operated by prisoners. In 1921, the prison was converted into a Borstal Institution and as a result, the quarry and associated masonry works closed. It is likely that the lime kiln also ceased at this time.

The lime kiln has a rubble core and is faced with Portland stone. It was built against an enhanced bank with a charging ramp to the right side to facilitate the loading of the kiln with fuel and broken limestone. The design of the building has a tapering cylindrical form, with the charging ramp being more rectangular in plan. In 2009, the lime kiln was designated Grade II. Historic England commented that it remains a "well-preserved and distinctive feature of the lime industry and an important survival on Portland" and is of "special historic interest for its location and association with Portland quarries and the prison's use of convict labour during the 19th century and the early 20th century".

== Gallery ==
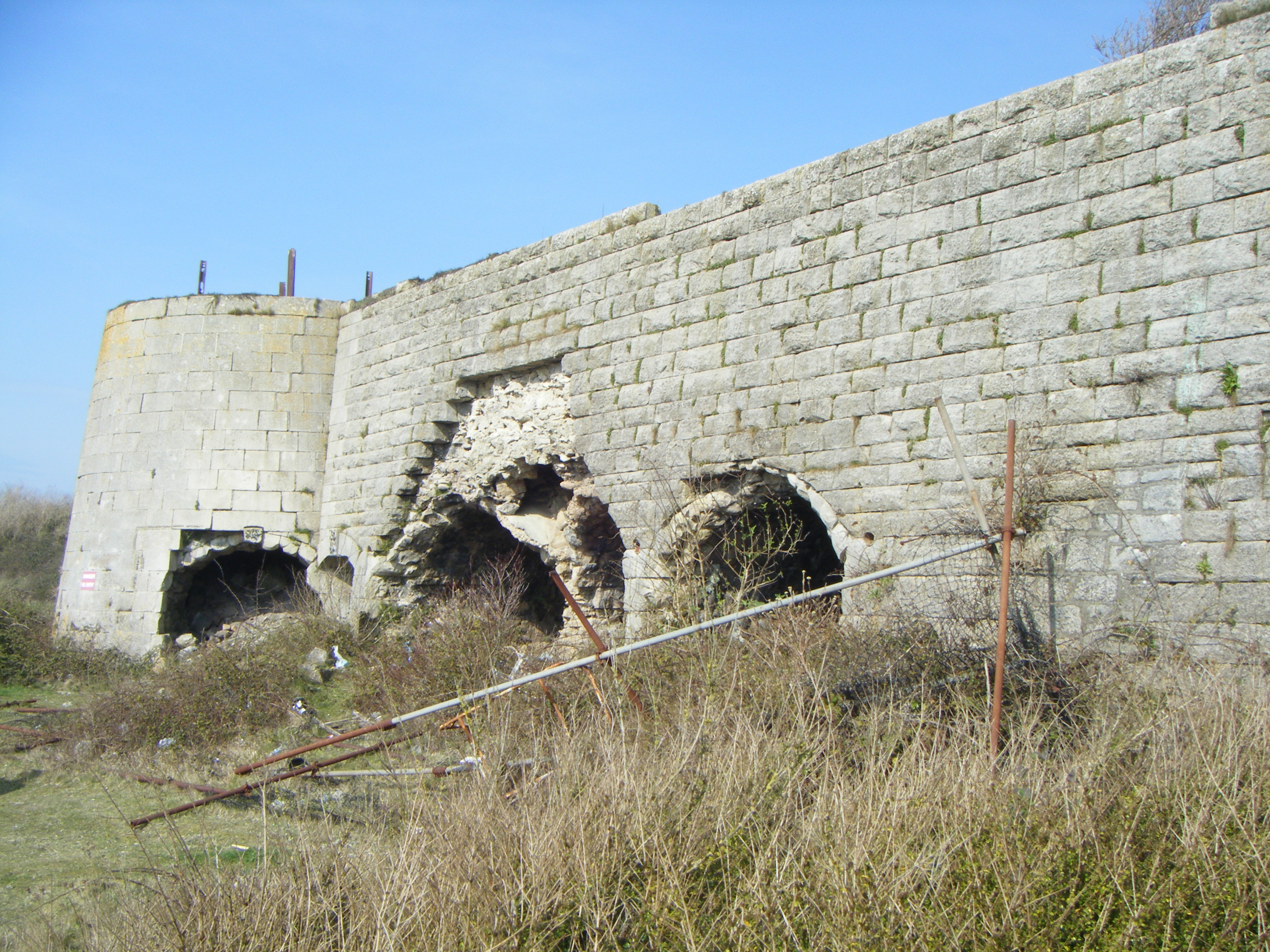

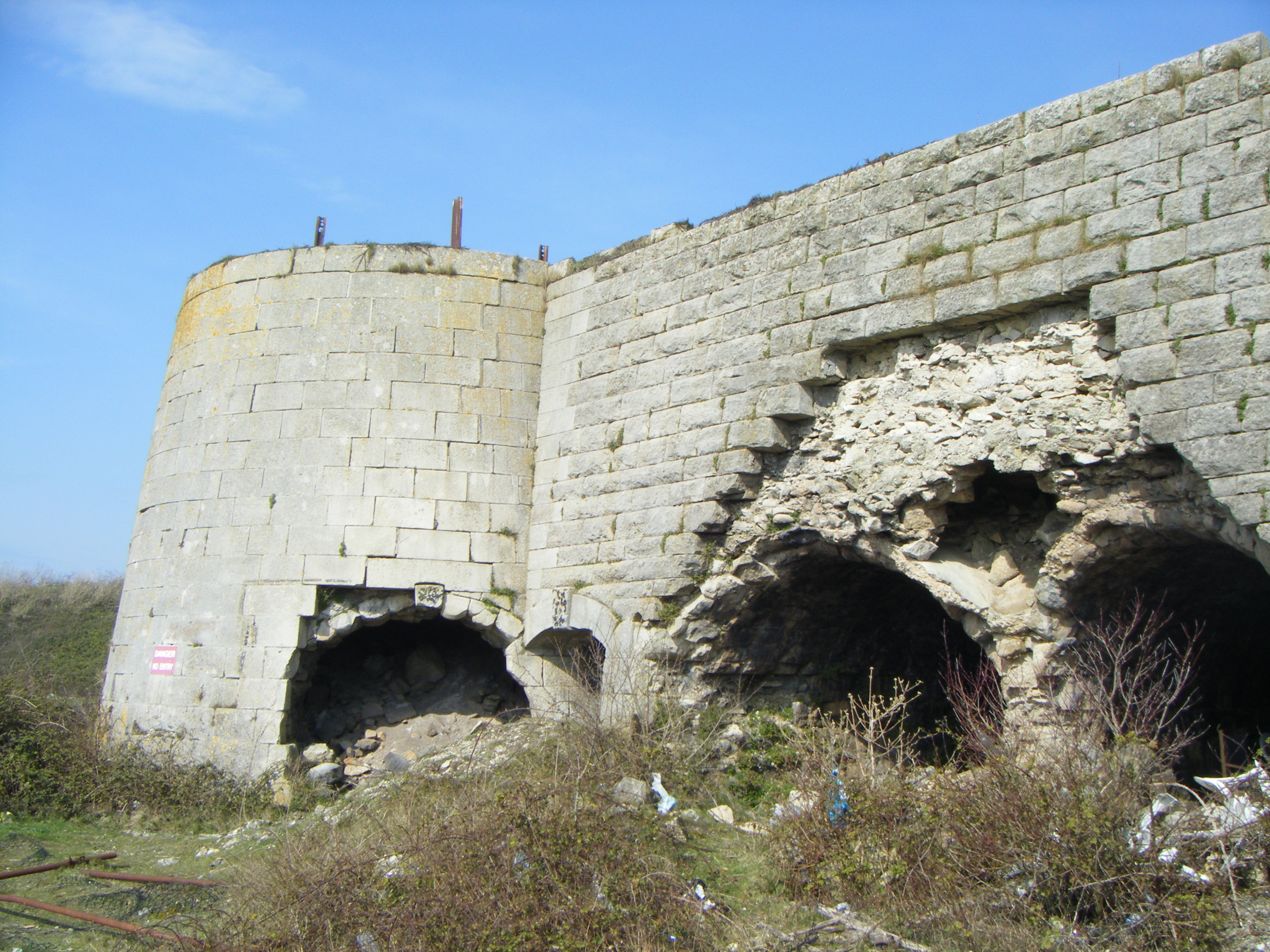

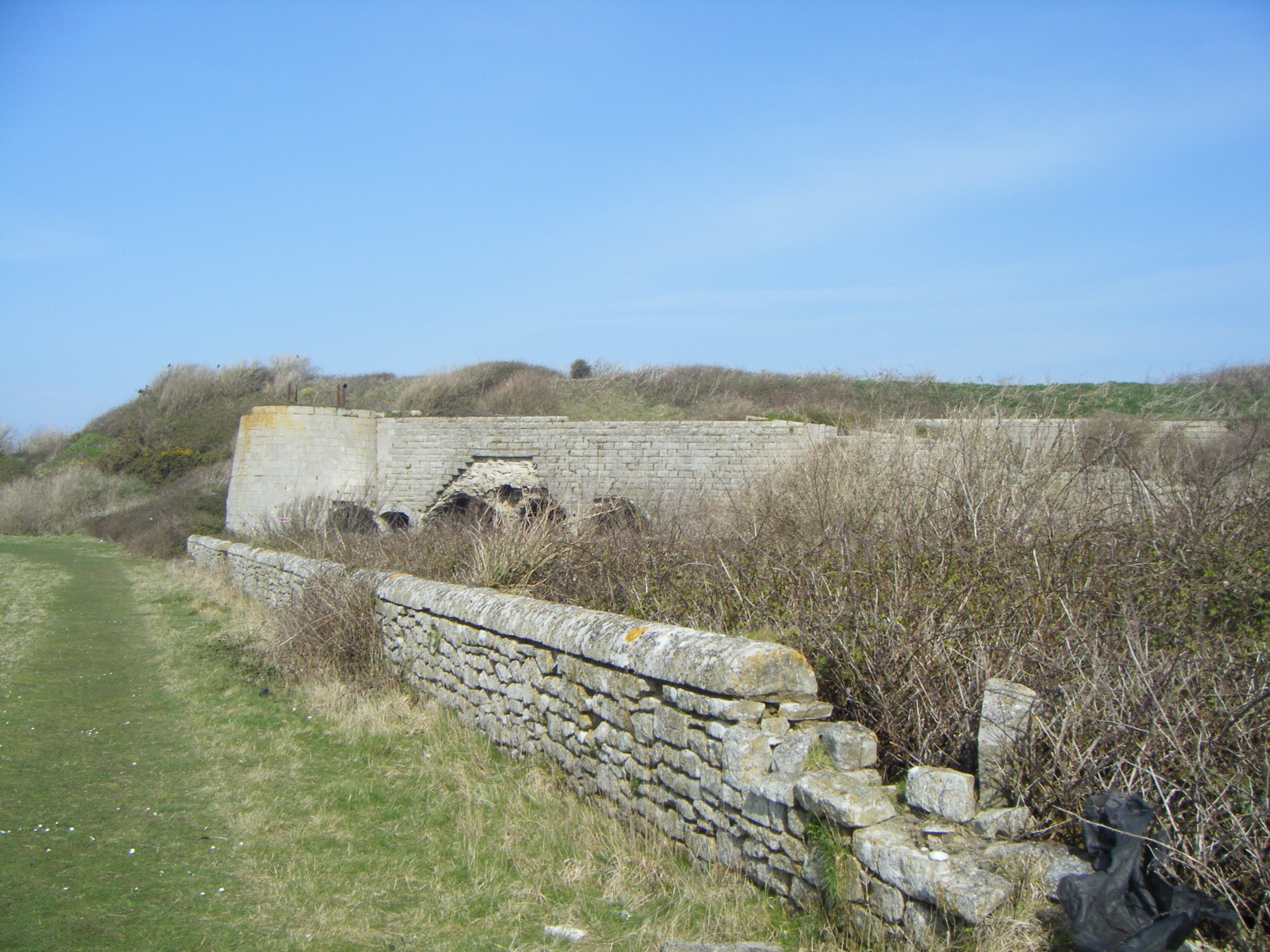
