= Verne High Angle Battery =

Artillery battery in Portland, Dorset, England

Coordinates: 50.5581°N 2.4334°W

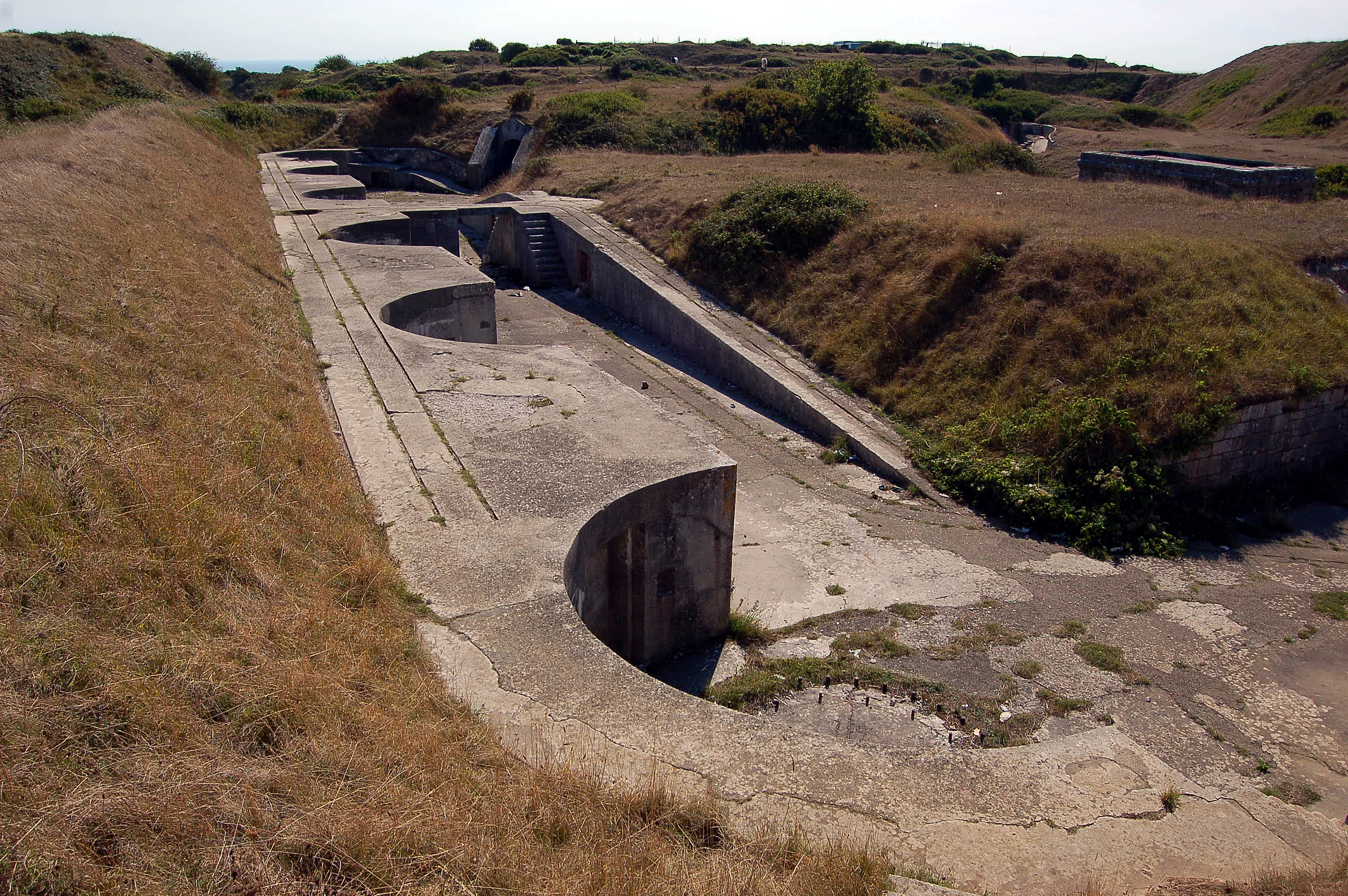
This view shows approximately one-fifth of the structure.

The Verne High Angle Battery is a former 19th-century gun battery on the Isle of Portland in Dorset, England. Situated close to the Verne Citadel, the battery is Grade II Listed, and forms part of the citadel's scheduled monument status. The battery has become a tourist attraction, while the battery's tunnels are often referred to by their local name 'Ghost Tunnels'.

== History ==
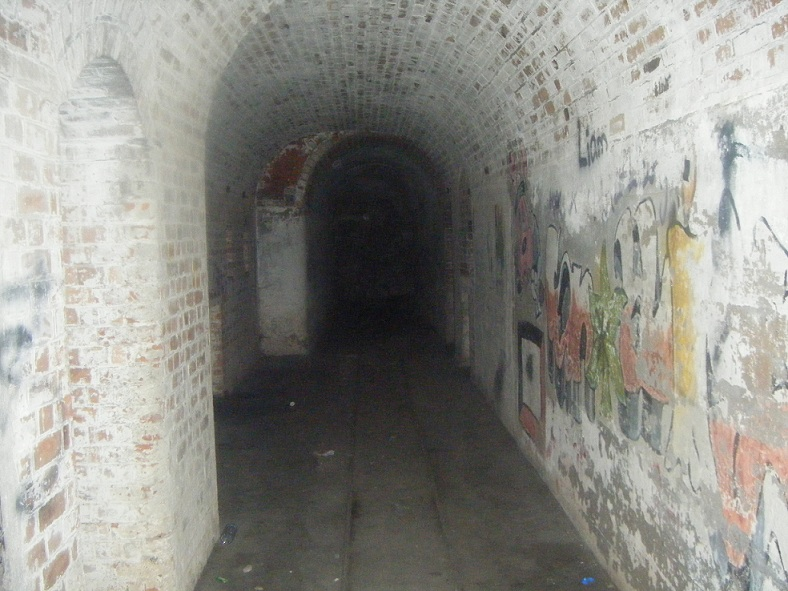
A view inside one of the battery's underground magazine tunnels

The battery was built in 1892 to protect Portland Harbour. Having been constructed within a disused quarry, the battery's guns were hidden from enemy's view. The "high angle" that the RML 9 inch 12 ton guns fired at ensured shells dropped down to inflict maximum damage on the vulnerable upper decks of an enemy vessel. The guns were able to traverse through 360 degrees. The battery had positions were built for six guns. Two additional pits were soon added, but no guns were fitted. Shells were stored in two tunnel magazines, while between these was a troop shelter, laboratory and store buildings.

With the invention of smaller craft like torpedo boats, the guns were less likely to score a hit, resulting in the battery's decommissioning in 1906. From 1918, the battery was used for storing field guns from France and in the 1960s one of the emplacements was used for testing the capsules in which nuclear material was transported.
