= Governor's Community Garden =

Public garden in Dorset, England

Coordinates: 50.5485°N 2.4209°W

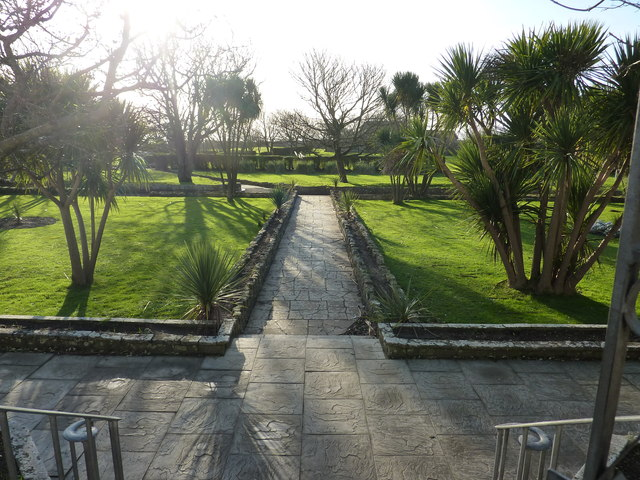
Opening area of Governor's Community Garden.

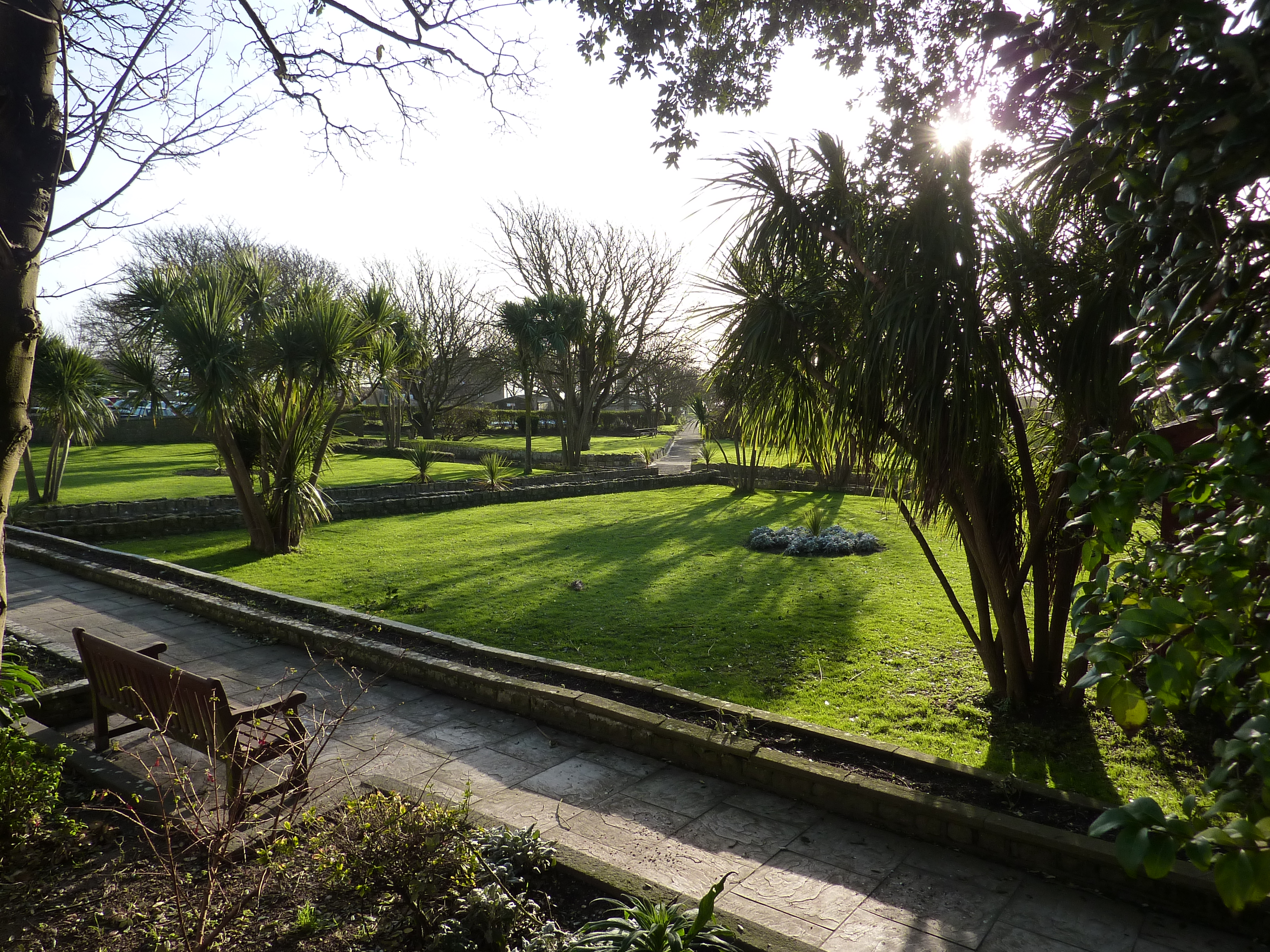
Governor's Community Garden.

Governor's Community Garden is a public garden, located on the Isle of Portland, Dorset, England. It is found within The Grove village, opposite the site of HM Prison Portland.

== History ==
Following the opening of the prison in 1848, the gardens were laid out in 1851, in the style of a French Palace Garden. They were attached to the prison governor's residence. The publication "Good Words" in 1873 described "a pretty flower garden" with the Governor's house. During the 20th century, the gardens fell into disrepair until in 2010, when the gardens were turned into a new community space, leased by the Portland Community Partnership for use of the public.

In August 2010, the community project was funded by the Big Lottery 'Changing Spaces' administered by Groundwork UK. The Portland Community Partnership and Portland Gas Trust was awarded £46,254 to allow development of the new play area and botanic garden together with publicity and promotion resources. In 2011, the restoration of the garden was awarded a special commendation Weymouth Civic Society Award.

In 2014, the Grove Prison Museum was opened in the former deputy governor's house across from the original gatehouse of the prison. The entrance is located through the gardens. Within the garden lies one of three Victorian ventilator shafts, once used as a ventilator to a sewer system. All three became Grade II Listed monuments in September 1978.
