= Verne Citadel =

Citadel in Portland, Dorset, England

Coordinates: 50.5622°N 2.4357°W

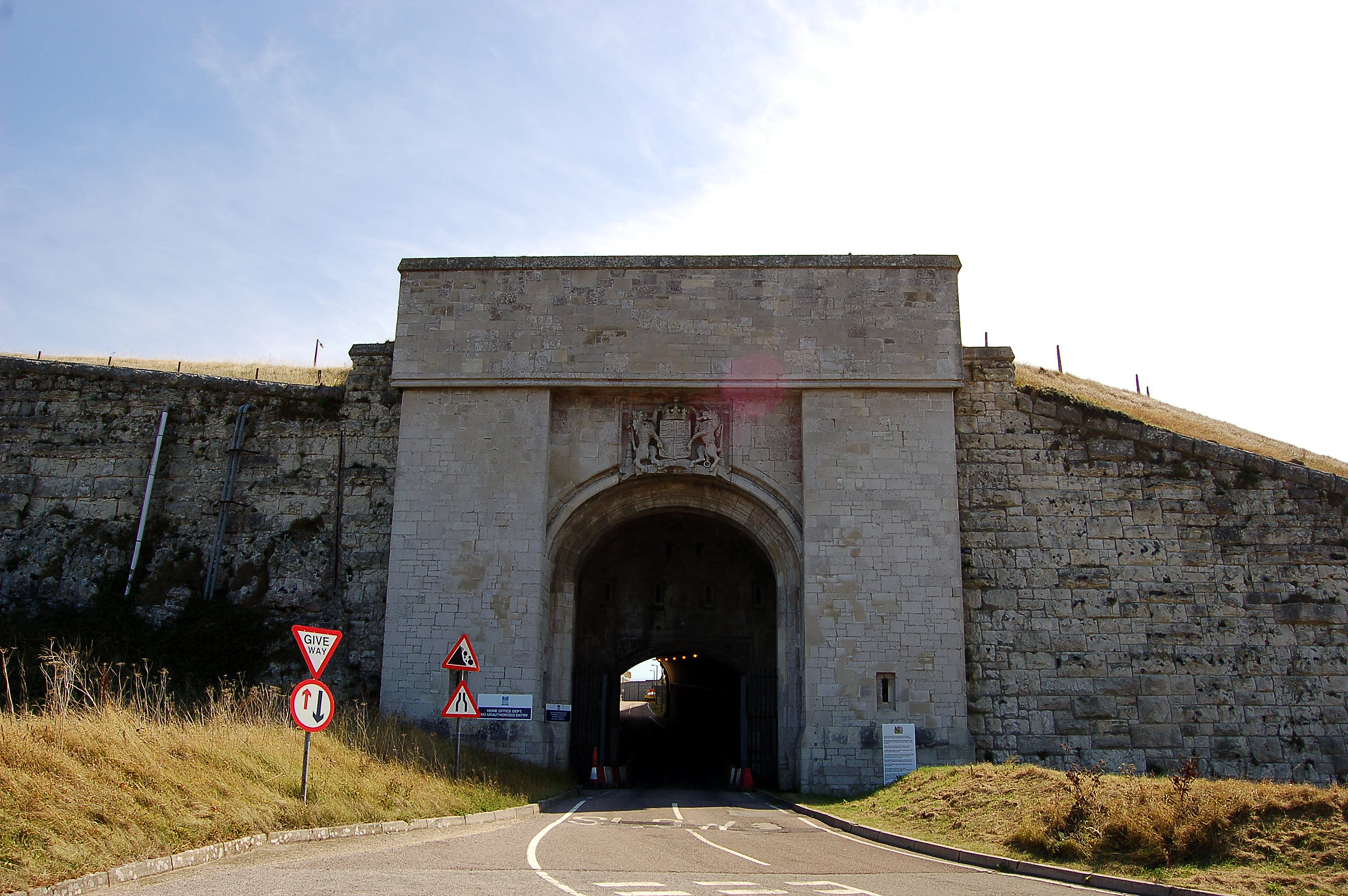
- Main entrance to The Verne

Site information
- Open to the public: No
- Condition: Complete

Location

Site history
- Built: 1857-1881
- In use: Prison
- Materials: Earth; Masonry

Verne Citadel is a 19th-century citadel on the Isle of Portland, Dorset, England. Located on the highest point of Portland, Verne Hill, it sits in a commanding position overlooking Portland Harbour, which it was built to defend. In 1949, it became HM Prison The Verne.

== History ==
The citadel was built between 1857 and 1881, as Portland Harbour's main fortification. Naturally inaccessible from the north and east, the south and west sides were protected by the digging of a large ditch. Both East Weare Battery and East Weare Camp, located below the eastern side of the Verne, were considered part of the citadel's outworks.

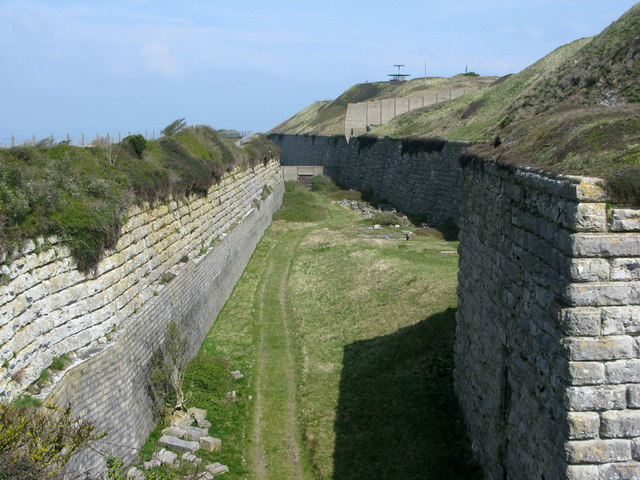
The moat

The citadel was designed with open gun emplacements on the north, east and west sides. As its defensive role came to an end, by 1903 the citadel had become an infantry barracks. During World War I and II, the Verne became the Headquarters of Coast Artillery. During World War II, a Chain Home Low Radar set was installed within the citadel, and the main magazine became a hospital. After the war, the last military use of the fort was by the Royal Engineers.

The citadel was turned into a prison in 1949, becoming a Category C prison for 575 adult males, serving medium-to-long term sentences. In 2013, the prison closed and became an immigration removal centre for 600 detainees awaiting deportation in 2014. The centre was transformed back into a prison in 2017–18.

== Grade listed features ==
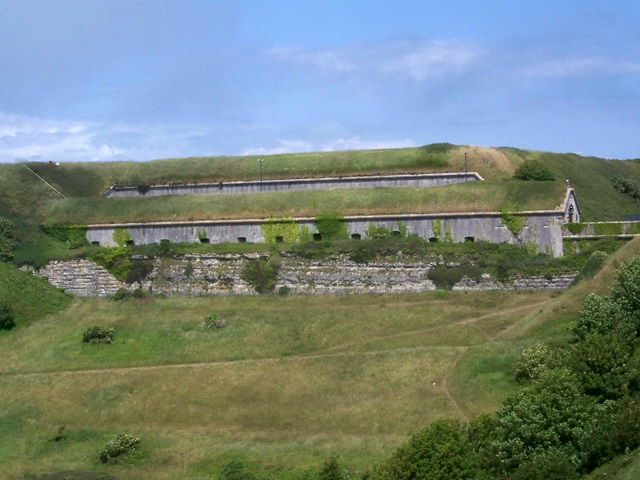
The battery at the southern entrance of the Verne

The citadel, including the Verne High Angle Battery, is a scheduled monument under the Ancient Monuments and Archaeological Areas Act 1979. In recent years, the Citadel has been listed on English Heritage's Risk Register.

Both the North and South Entrances, as well as the south west and south east casemates, are Grade II* Listed. The railings at the approach to the north entrance form part of the original construction and are Grade II Listed. The prison's reception centre is also Grade II Listed. In September 1978, five other features of the citadel became Grade II Listed: the prison's blacksmith's shop, the prison chapel, the officer's block B, the prison gymnasium, and the detached Governor's house.

The East Weare Battery, and the detention barracks of East Weare Camp (built circa 1880), both became Grade II Listed in May 1993. The Verne High Angle Battery was built in 1892, approximately 150 metres south of the citadel's southern entrance, as part of Britain's Coastal Defences. Decommissioned in 1906, it became Grade II Listed in May 1993 too.

== Bibliography ==
- Hogg, Ian V (1974). Coast Defences of England and Wales 1856-1956. David & Charles. ISBN 0-7153 6353-0.
