= St Joseph's Church, Weymouth =

Church in Dorset, England

St Joseph's Church
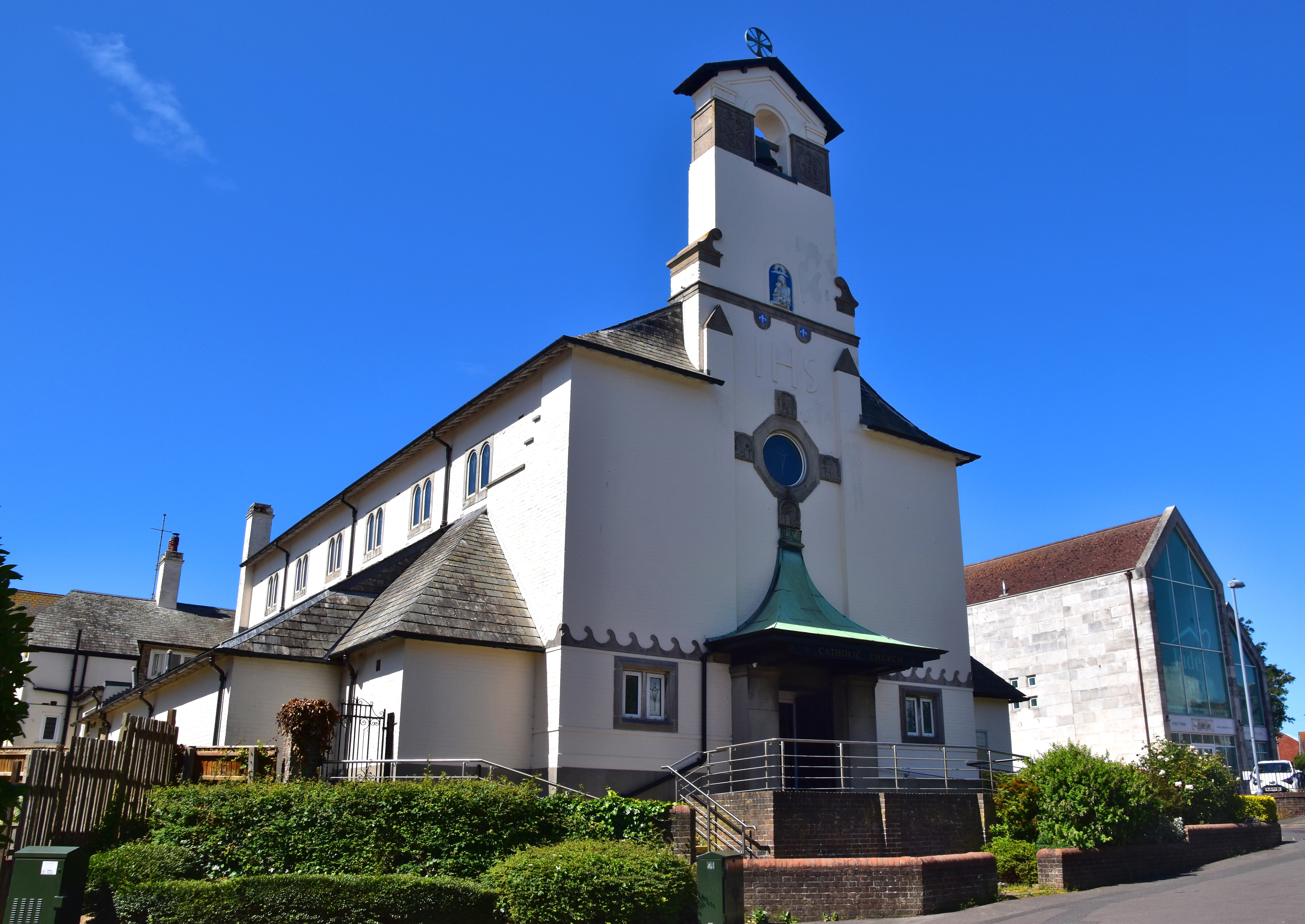

Religion
- Affiliation: Roman Catholic
- Ecclesiastical or organizational status: Active

Location
- Location: Weymouth, Dorset, England
- Interactive map of St Joseph's Church
- Coordinates: 50.6117°N 2.4595°W

Architecture
- Architect: George Drysdale
- Type: Church
- Completed: 1934

St Joseph's Church is a Roman Catholic church in Weymouth, Dorset, England. It was designed by George Drysdale and built in 1933–34.

The church has been a Grade II listed building since 2009. Historic England consider it a "good example" of a church of its period, which "embodies the late flowering of Arts and Crafts principles with [the] Romanesque style". They praised the "accomplished and distinctive design" and display of "high standard craftsmanship".

== History ==
The first Roman Catholic church to be built in Weymouth followed the passing of the Roman Catholic Relief Act 1829. Although priests had ministered in the town beforehand, the passing of the act saw Fr. Peter Hartley appointed to the town. He purchased a suitable plot of land in Dorchester Road and had St Augustine's Church built there, which opened on 22 October 1835. By the 1920s, St Augustine's was too small to accommodate the local congregation, particularly during the peak season when holidaymakers and visitors often resulted in overcrowded services at the church. Furthermore, Weymouth's priest at the time, Fr. Jules Ketele, felt Weymouth would be adequately served by a new church in a more central location.

A committee was formed in 1925 and fundraising carried out over the following years. A plot of land at Stavordale Road was purchased at the beginning of 1932 and plans for the church drawn up by Mr. George Drysdale of London. The building contract was awarded to Mr. William Lacey of Hounslow and the foundation stone laid by the Bishop of Plymouth, Rev. Dr. John Barrett, on 3 May 1933. The church was opened by Bishop Barrett on 18 April 1934. Both the church and its presbytery were constructed at a cost of over £9,000, and with their opening, St Augustine's became a chapel of ease to St Joseph's.

A shrine representing the Lourdes grotto was dedicated in the grounds of the church in 1949. It was erected by Fr. Ketele following his pledge to do so if the church escaped air raid damage during World War II. It also acted as a war memorial and contains a tablet listing the local Catholic men who lost their lives during the conflict. A parish hall was opened behind the church in 1951, which was designed by Mr. G. C. Wilkins and built by Messrs A. E. Whettham and Son.

== Architecture ==
St Joseph's is built of painted brick, with dressings in cast concrete and limestone, and roofing of Cornish slate. It was designed to accommodate 300 persons, and is made up of a narthex, nave, north and south aisles, clerestory, chancel, organ/choir gallery, baptistery, linked sacristy and attached presbytery. A large bell turret sits on the gable above the main entrance. The interior contains plastered walls, parquet flooring and pine pews. The church's temporary altar was replaced by a marble one in 1937 and its original organ was replaced in 1948.
