= Portland Breakwater Lighthouse, Dorset =

Lighthouse in England

Portland Breakwater Lighthouse
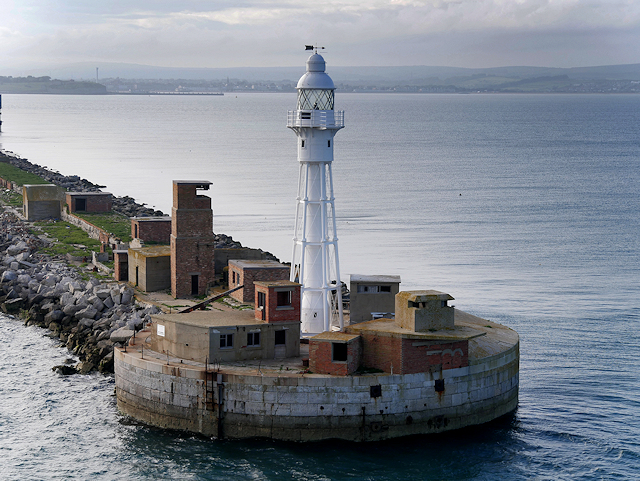
- The Portland Breakwater Lighthouse in 2017
- Location: Isle of Portland; Dorset; England
- Coordinates: 50°35′09.4″N 02°25′04.3″W

Tower
- Constructed: 1905
- Construction: cast iron skeletal tower
- Height: 22 m (72 ft)
- Shape: hexagonal pyramidal tower with central cylinder, balcony and lantern
- Markings: white tower and lantern
- Operator: Portland Harbour Authority

Light
- Focal height: 22 m (72 ft)
- Range: 10 nmi (19 km; 12 mi)
- Characteristic: Fl W 10s.

The Portland Breakwater Lighthouse is a functioning lighthouse located at Portland Harbour, Isle of Portland, Dorset, England. It is situated on the southern end of the north-east breakwater.

The lighthouse, a white hexagonal cast-iron structure, was established in 1905. Built by Chance Brothers, initially it displayed a white flash every five seconds and had a visible range of 14 nmi (26 km; 16 mi). It was also provided with a fog bell, sounding once every ten seconds in foggy weather.

The light was originally lit by oil, later changed to gas and is today lit electrically with a modern LED lamp. The light was owned by the Admiralty, but managed by Trinity House (who, until the light was automated in the late 1960s, provided three resident keepers accommodated in a nearby dwelling on the breakwater).

The lighthouse was restored and repainted in 1995, prior to the closure of Portland Naval Base; subsequently, ownership of the lighthouse (along with the harbour as a whole) was vested in Portland Port Ltd, and the Portland Harbour Authority took over its management.

The lighthouse underwent restoration again in 2016. The lighthouse's current use continues to aid navigation of boats in the area, warning mariners of the breakwaters by giving a white flash every 10 seconds. Surrounding the lighthouse are various defensive buildings such as pillboxes.

The former optic from the lighthouse has been placed in Weymouth Museum.

== Lighthouse Staff ==
In a 2005 newsletter of the South Dorset Amateur Radio, former keeper John Trotter recalled memories of the lighthouse:

"I was a supernumerary Assistant Keeper at Portland Breakwater Lighthouse in 1966 - I did 2 two month stints. We lived in one of the buildings, just down from the light tower. We had to climb them every two hours during the night to wind up the lens and pump oil up to the lamp. The breakwater was shared with about a million rats and each time you went out at night there would be a carpet of them fleeing from the torchlight. We took it in turns to go ashore for one morning a week."

== See also ==
- List of lighthouses in England
