= The Old Engine Shed, Portland =

Building in Portland, Dorset, England

Coordinates: 50.5538°N 2.4246°W

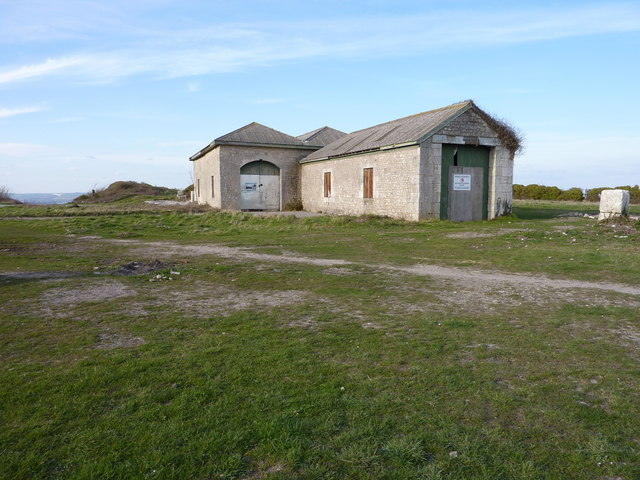
The Old Engine Shed

The Old Engine Shed is a disused 19th-century shed, once used to house locomotives serving the Admiralty Quarries. The shed overlooks East Weares and is located near The Grove village area, on the Isle of Portland, Dorset. It has been a Listed Grade II building since 2001, with English Heritage recording that it is unusual for locomotive sheds from this period to survive in so unaltered a state.

== History ==
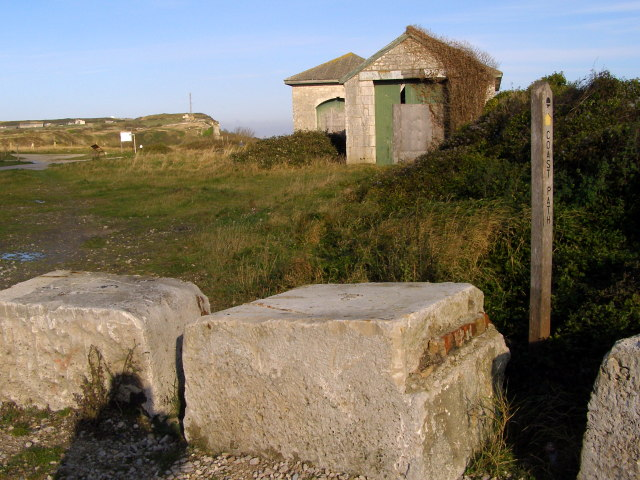
The Old Engine Shed

The shed was built for the use of the Admiralty Quarries, housing the locomotives used on the quarry lines. The shed was used for various purposes over the span of 150 years and at one point provided stabling for quarry horses. The shed was in use until circa 1935. In 2007, plans by Portland Gas Storage Ltd were announced to turn the shed into a £1.5 million interpretation centre, as part of a £350 million gas storage facility to be housed the island. However, the project has since come to a standstill.
