= East Weare Battery =

Artillery battery in Dorset, England

- Isle of Portland; Dorset; England

Site information
- Owner: Portland Port
- Open to the public: No
- Condition: Derelict

Location
- Coordinates: 50.5636°N 2.4284°W

Site history
- Built: 1862–1869
- Materials: Stone; Concrete

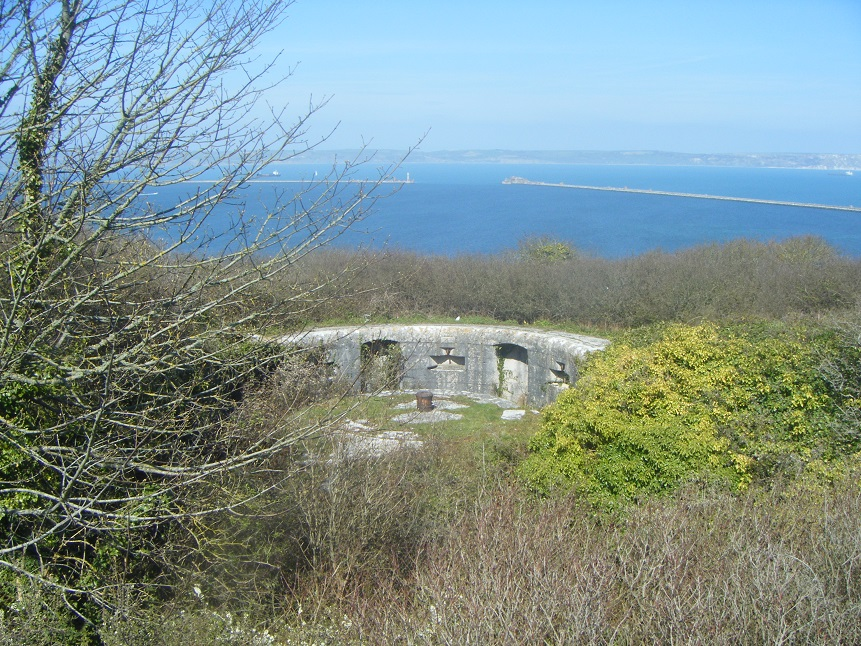
Position for Rifled Muzzle Loading (RML) gun at East Weare Gun Battery E Portland

East Weare Battery is a former 19th-century gun battery to the east of the Verne Citadel on the Isle of Portland in Dorset, England. The battery was built in the 1860s as a result of the Royal Commission to guard the new Portland harbour and Royal Navy institutions on the island. Five open batteries were built housing 20 9" and 10" RMLs. After 1877 the batteries were designated by letter 'A' to 'E'.

In 1900 the batteries were re-armed with more modern breech loading guns. 'A' battery received two 9.2 inch Breech Loading (BL) guns and 'B' battery received three BL 6 inch Mk VII guns on Central Pivot Mk II mounts. By 1919 the 6-inch guns had been removed, but the 9.2-inch guns remained in place until the dissolution of Coast Artillery in 1956.

The site was then used for training by the Royal Navy, which has damaged some of the gun positions. The batteries are derelict and there is no public access. Parts of the batteries are now listed as Ancient Monuments by Historic England.
