= Portland Harbour =

Port in Dorset, England

Coordinates: 50.585°N 2.445°W

Location
- Interactive map of Portland Harbour

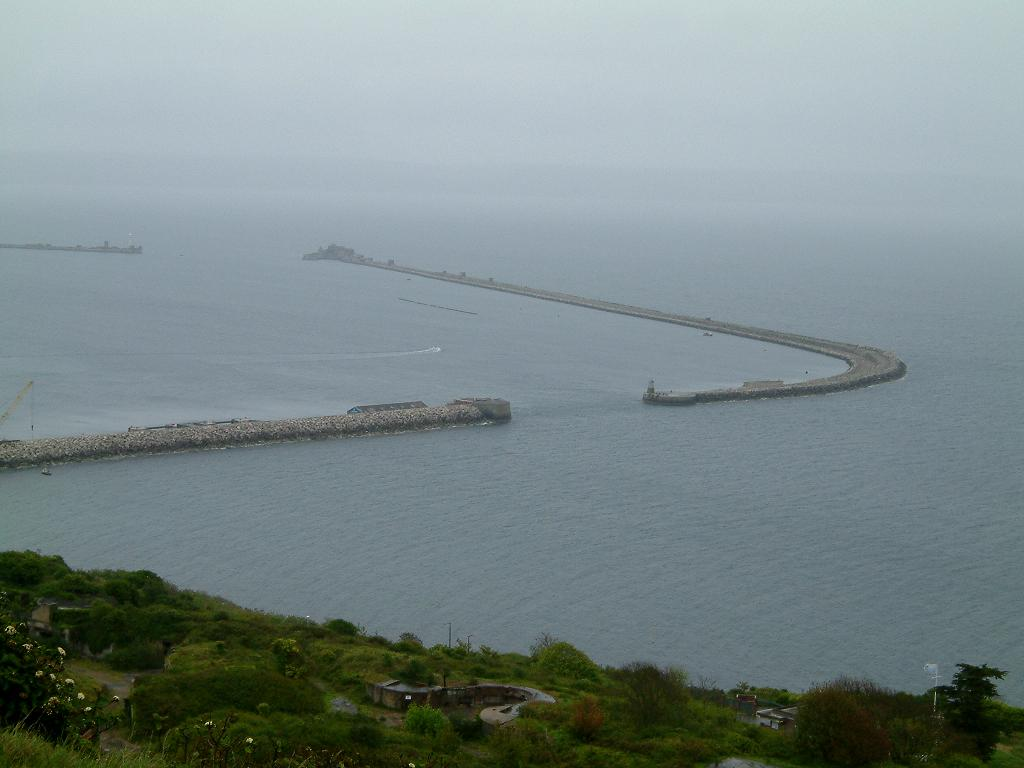
Southern and eastern entrances of Portland Harbour looking northeast from the Isle of Portland across Balaclava Bay. The dark colour of the water between the two breakwaters in the foreground indicates the position of the scuttled battleship HMS Hood.

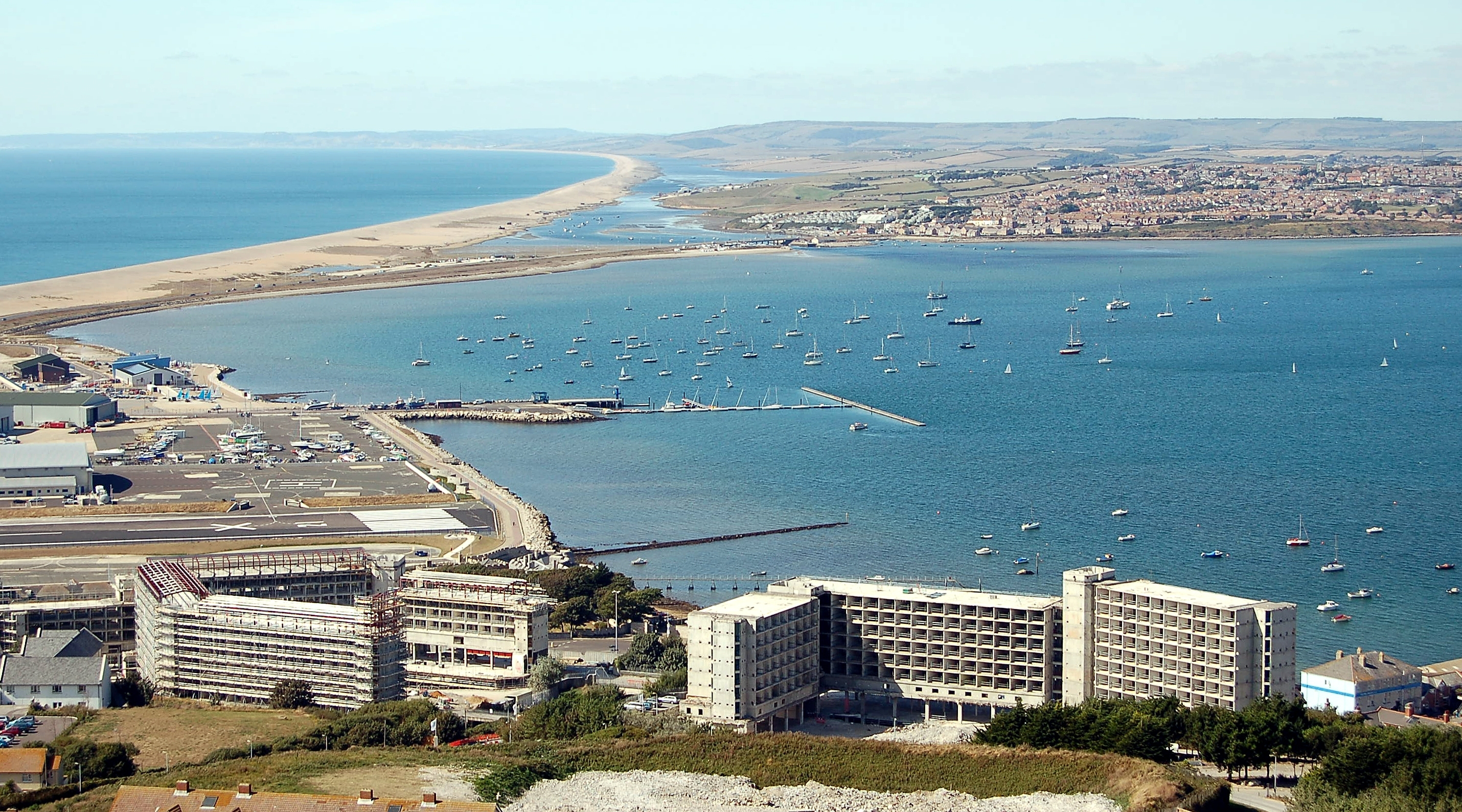
The western side of the Harbour with Chesil Beach, Lyme Bay and the Fleet Lagoon in the background.

Portland Harbour is beside the Isle of Portland, Dorset, on the south coast of England. Construction of the harbour began in 1849; when completed in 1872, its 520-hectare (1,300-acre) surface area made it the largest human-made harbour in the world, and it remains one of the largest in the world today. It is naturally sheltered by Portland to the south, Chesil Beach to the west and mainland Dorset to the north. It consists of four breakwaters: two southern and two northern. These have a total length of 4.57 km (2.84 mi) and enclose approximately 1,000 ha (2,500 acres) of water.

Portland Harbour was built by the Admiralty as a facility for the Royal Navy (though access was also available to merchant ships); on 11 December 1923 it was formally designated HM Naval Base (HMNB) Portland, and continued to serve as such until closure in 1995.

== History ==
=== Creation of harbour of refuge (1844–1872) ===
The original harbour was naturally sheltered by the south coast of England, Chesil Beach and the Isle of Portland, providing refuge for ships against weather in all directions except east. The harbour had already been used by ships for centuries when, in the 16th century, King Henry VIII built Portland Castle and Sandsfoot Castle to defend the anchorage. Prompted by the expansion of the French naval port of Cherbourg, just across the English Channel, the Royal Navy established a base at Portland in 1845; a scheme for the harbour to be transformed into a refuge had been granted parliamentary approval the year before. Portland was the first naval anchorage specifically designed for the new steam navy. Similar harbours of refuge would be built at Alderney, Dover, Holyhead, and later (in response to the increased naval threat from Germany) at Peterhead.

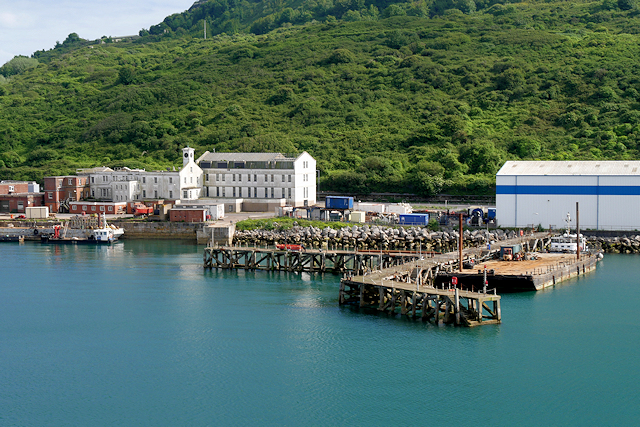
Dockyard Offices (left), built (as the Engineer's Office) by John Coode in 1848, extended to the west in 1910.

Construction of the two breakwaters began in 1849 when HRH Prince Albert laid the foundation stone on 25 July. Designed by engineer James Meadows Rendel, the work was carried out under civil engineer John Towlerton Leather, with Rendel as engineer in chief (until his death in 1856), and John Coode as resident engineer. During 1848, HM Prison Portland was established to provide convict labour to quarry the stone needed to construct the breakwaters and the harbour defences. Known as the Admiralty Quarries, they provided 10,000 tons of stone per week. The breakwaters were declared complete by HRH Edward the Prince of Wales on 10 August 1872. A major government project, the construction work had become Dorset's greatest tourist attraction of its time.

=== Construction of harbour defences ===
The initial southern breakwaters were built between 1849 and 1872; meanwhile, various defences were created to defend the harbour. The Verne Citadel, designed by Captain Crosman R.E., was built at Verne Hill between 1860 and 1881: the 56 acre (23 ha) fortress was designed for 1000 troops and had gun emplacements facing seawards on three sides. Below the eastern side of the citadel, East Weare Battery was built during the 1860s, along with the detention barracks East Weare Camp. On the end of the inner breakwater was the Inner Pierhead Fort, and on the outer breakwater the circular Breakwater Fort. On Weymouth's side of the harbour, the Nothe Fort was built at the end of the Nothe Peninsula, and completed in 1872. In 1892, the Verne High Angle Battery was built in a disused quarry near the Verne Citadel, but was decommissioned in 1906.

As part of further defence works against the threat of torpedo attack, the harbour's two northern breakwaters were built between 1893 and 1906. In 1902, additional defences were constructed, including Upton Fort at Osmington and Blacknor Fort on the western side of Portland. By 1903, the East Weares Rifle Range served the navy and other military on the eastern side of the island. In 1905, the Portland Breakwater Lighthouse was erected on the southern end of northeast breakwater, where it continues to operate today.

=== Establishment of Royal Navy at Portland ===
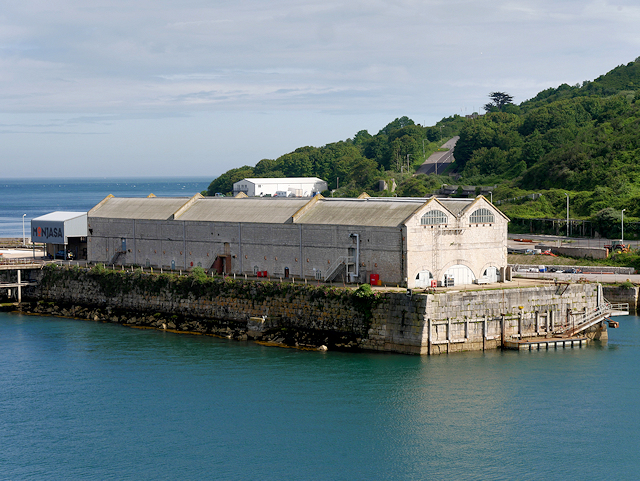
Coaling shed (1856–60) on the inner breakwater. Coal was stored on the first floor and then deployed in railway wagons to waiting vessels moored along the length of the breakwater.

The harbour was envisaged primarily as a coaling station for the Royal Navy, being conveniently equidistant from the Royal Navy's two principal bases at Portsmouth and Devonport; however it was also where the Channel Squadron was based, newly re-formed in 1858.

In the 20th century, Portland became increasingly renowned for its training and research facilities.

==== Fuelling facilities ====
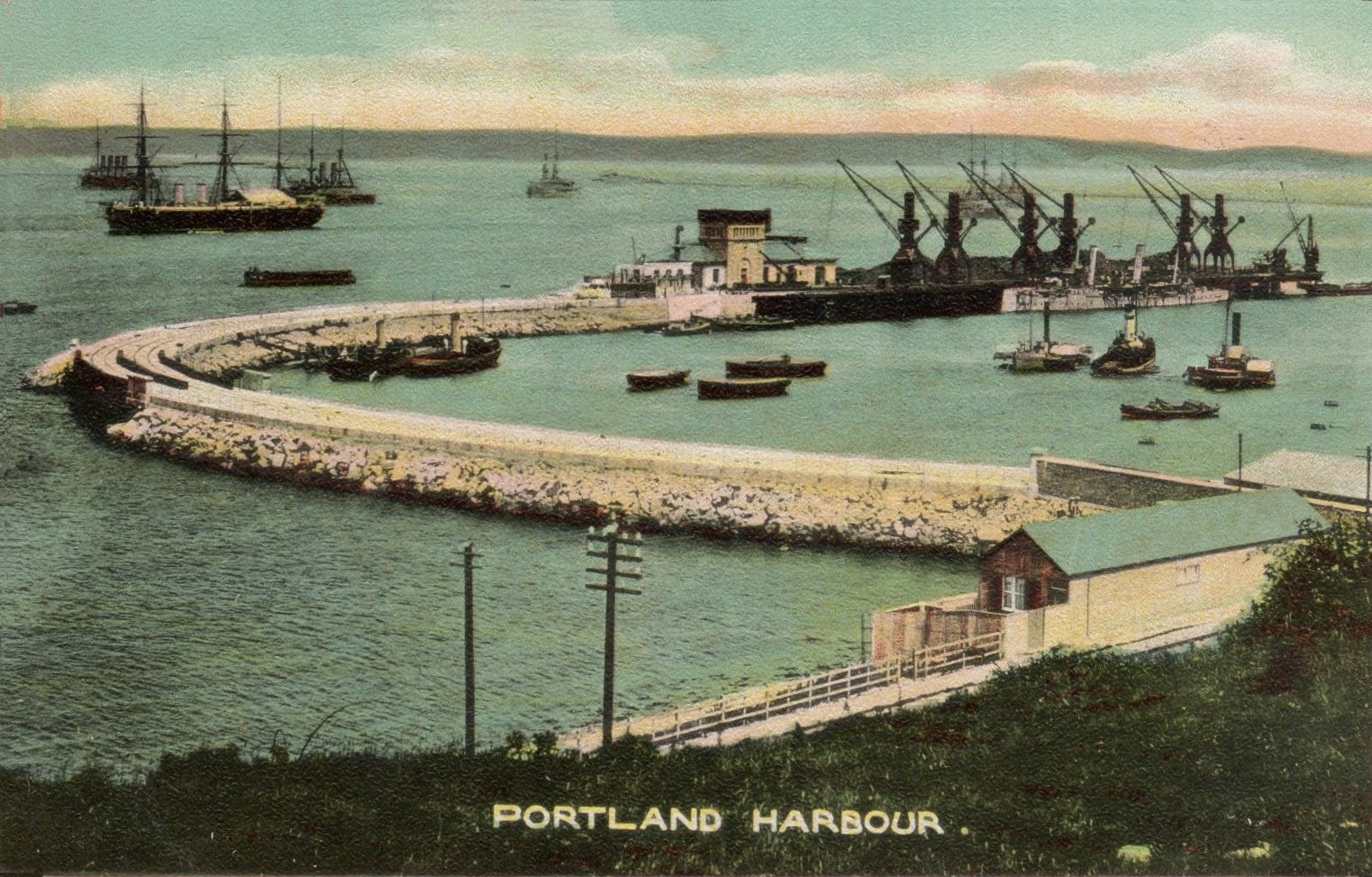
The new coaling pier (picture postcard, 1910).

Coaling facilities were initially integrated into the design of the inner breakwater. A new coaling pier was built between 1890 and 1896, and expanded coaling facilities were still being added in 1906. During the 20th century the harbour increasingly became a naval oiling depot and, beginning in the early 1900s, the tidal creek the Mere began to be filled in for a vast tank farm.

==== Naval base ====
Over time, Portland was successively the base for the Channel and Home Fleets, as well as part of the Reserve Fleet, and it also served as a depot for submarines. In the early years of the 20th century it served as base for the Navy's first Torpedo Boat Destroyers.

==== Naval Dockyard facilities ====
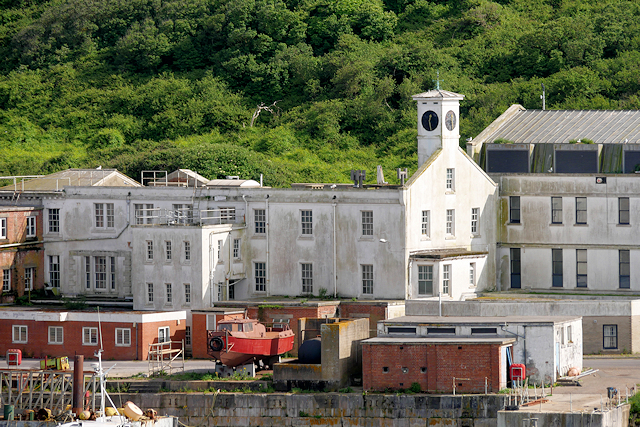
Dockyard Offices (later Naval Headquarters): the 1910 extension to the original engineer's office of 1848.

In the 1850s it had been proposed that a full Royal Navy Dockyard be established, with three dry docks, three shipbuilding slips, a fitting-out basin and associated factory facilities. These plans were not carried through, however a floating dry dock was introduced in 1914, enabling Portland to function as a repair and refit facility, and by 1914 Portland was officially listed as a Naval Dockyard (remaining so until 1959). Onshore amenities included a range of storehouses, workshops and office buildings.

==== Support facilities ====
Support facilities for the fleet were also added over time, including a canteen and recreation ground (opened in 1903). The nearby Royal Naval Hospital in Castletown served the naval base from 1904 (replacing an earlier Sick Quarters), until 1957 when it was handed over to the NHS.

==== Research facilities ====
The development of both the torpedo and the submarine led to Portland Harbour becoming a centre for research into underwater warfare, beginning with the establishment of Whitehead Torpedo Works at Wyke Regis in 1891. A purpose-built pier projecting into the harbour from the factory was used for torpedo testing and practice firing. The factory closed in 1997 and was cleared to make way for a housing development named Whitehead Drive, which includes a memorial stone and plaque to commemorate the factory.

==== Training facilities ====
In 1862 HMS Britannia was moored at Portland to serve as a training ship for naval cadets. She was replaced by HMS Boscawen in 1866 (following Britannia's relocation to Dartmouth). Boscawen was herself replaced in 1873 by HMS Trafalgar, which took on the same name. In 1882 an onshore training complex was built, above the dockyard on Portland Bill. As the Royal Navy grew in size towards the end of the 19th century, additional accommodation was required for boys' training, which saw the arrival of HMS Minotaur in 1898 and Agincourt in 1904; they were named Boscawen II and Boscawen III respectively. The training establishment closed in 1906; while Boscawen (ex-Trafalgar) was sold, Boscawen II and Boscawen III were transferred to Harwich and subsequently attached to HMS Ganges.

=== World War I to World War II (1914–1945) ===
The increasing threat of conflict with Germany before the Great War erupted saw the arrival of the Dreadnoughts in Portland, while seaplanes began to operate in Portland's skies. King George V watched aerial displays from the royal yacht in the harbour in May 1912. This occasion saw a biplane demonstrate the first British flight from a moving ship, and afterwards the king took the first ever royal trip in a submarine.

In 1914, the Grand Fleet assembled in Portland Harbour before sailing to Scapa Flow. As a measure against submarine attack, the battleship HMS Hood was scuttled across the harbour's southern entrance in 1914.

==== Anti-submarine School and ASDIC Research & Development ====
In 1917 the RNAS seaplane base at Portland was commissioned as HMS Sarepta. Under its command, a 'listening school' was established to help develop hydrophone underwater listening devices and other anti-submarine measures, and to train personnel in their use. The school initially operated from temporary accommodation in Weymouth, before moving in 1918 to a site at East Weare, just south of the Dockyard. Meanwhile, the experimental work was carried out within the dockyard itself: namely in a pair of sheds on the inner breakwater and in what had been the Admiralty Slaughter Houses (just to the south, at Balaclava Bay), which were swiftly converted into workshops. The dockyard swimming pool was also put to use, as a testing tank.

Sarepta was decommissioned in December 1919, but the anti-submarine work continued, overseen from the cruiser HMS Gibraltar, which became lead ship of a small anti-submarine flotilla, made up of R-class destroyers and P-class patrol boats, fitted with ASDIC for training and for experimental testing.

In 1924, however, Portland's Anti-Submarine School (having been consolidated with similar units from HMS Vernon and HM Signal School, Portsmouth) was itself commissioned as HMS Osprey, becoming an independent shore command. (HMS Icewhale initially served as the depot ship, and was duly renamed Osprey; but in 1928 she was sold out of service and the name was transferred ashore). Its facilities included laboratories and workshops, a large water tank for conducting experiments and an inshore testing site for trials of ASDIC on the inner breakwater (by the late 1930s over 200 civilians were employed in Osprey's ASDIC Research and Development Unit (ARDU)).

==== World War II ====
From 1940, the harbour came under fierce German air attack, with Portland suffering 48 air attacks, in which 532 bombs were dropped, over the course of the war. In July 1940, the anti-aircraft ship HMS Foylebank was attacked by Stuka dive-bombers and sank in the harbour. The second of only two Victoria Crosses awarded for action in the United Kingdom was posthumously bestowed on Jack Foreman Mantle, who died at his post on the ship. Although mortally wounded he continued to fire his gun against the attackers until he died. Mantle is buried in Portland's Royal Naval Cemetery, which overlooks the harbour. In 1940–41, the Portland Naval Communication Headquarters was constructed, built into the hillside at the rear of the dockyard.

In January 1941 Osprey moved out of Portland to the relative safety of Dunoon on the west coast of Scotland; the experimental section operated as a sub-division of Osprey, known as HM Anti-Submarine Experimental Establishment, in Fairlie, North Ayrshire. In the meantime the Portland was redesignated to serve as a Coastal Forces base, commissioned under the name HMS Attack.

On 1 May 1944, the harbour was commissioned as USNAAB Portland-Weymouth. Both Portland and Weymouth were major embarkation points for American troops during D-Day, particularly the US 1st Division who embarked for Omaha Beach in June 1944. The King, Prime Minister Churchill and Free French leader General de Gaulle came to see the great D-Day preparations at Portland; activity in the harbour was continuous. After the war, Portland's role in the liberation of Europe was marked by a ceremony in August 1945, when the American Ambassador John G. Winant unveiled a stone in Victoria Gardens commemorating the passing by the spot of 418,585 troops and 144,093 vehicles the previous June.

During both World Wars I and II, the bay was filled with neutral ships at anchor waiting to be searched for materials that might be useful to the enemy.

=== Post-war role and closure of naval base (1946–1995) ===
After the war, in 1946, ten Phoenix caissons of the Mulberry Harbour were towed back to Portland, eight of which were later given to the Netherlands to repair storm breaches in the dykes in 1953. The remaining two units now act as a wind-break, helping ships berth at Queen's Pier in the harbour.

==== HMS Osprey ====
In 1946, the anti-submarine school returned to Portland, and re-established itself at East Weare. In 1948 the administrative command of HMS Osprey was extended to cover the Naval Base as a whole. (The depot had been designated HMS Boscawen from 1932 up until that point; previously Portland had been designated a sub-Depot of HMS Victory in Portsmouth.) The 'Upper Osprey' site at East Weare was substantially rebuilt in the 1960s; subsequently much of it was given over to provide barracks accommodation for the base and its personnel.

==== Admiralty Underwater Weapons Establishment ====
HM A/S Experimental Establishment also returned to Portland in 1946. Over the next few years its headquarters on Balaclava Bay were rebuilt and extended, and it was again renamed as HM Underwater Detection Establishment (HMUDE).

At the same time, a new headquarters for the Admiralty Gunnery Establishment (AGE), which had transferred to Portland from Teddington, was built at Southwell between 1949 and 1952; it, however, transferred again in 1959 (to Portsdown Hill), allowing the building to be taken over by the Admiralty Underwater Weapons Establishment (AUWE), formed from an amalgamation of different establishments from different parts of the UK involved in researching and developing underwater weapons and detection systems (including HMUDE, which nevertheless remained in its Balaclava Bay premises). The latter was renamed AUWE (North), to distinguish it from the new building, AUWE (South), at Southwell.

The AUWE later became infamous for espionage infiltration, known as the Portland spy ring.

==== Portland Dockyard ====
In February 1958 it was announced in Parliament by the First Lord of the Admiralty that Portland Dockyard was to close the following year (though the naval base would be retained). At the time, the Dockyard employed 'some 1,600 industrial and non-industrial staff'. Within the same statement Sheerness Dockyard and a number of other naval establishments were also slated for closure.

==== Flag Officer Sea Training ====
As planned, Portland's Royal Dockyard closed in 1959, but the Naval Base remained open 'in support of the local establishments and H.M. ships using the harbour'. From 1958, the base's main occupation was Flag Officer Sea Training, which was a major success, and the harbour soon became the world's premier work-up and training base. Aside from the training of Royal Navy ships, many ships of NATO countries also trained and frequented at the harbour. Part of the Falklands War task force sailed from Portland in 1982. In 1984, two large accommodation blocks, totalling £25-30 million, were built in Castletown as barracks for Royal Navy personnel, along with a sports centre.

==== RNAS Portland ====
With the advent of the helicopter and its importance as an anti-submarine weapon, an airfield was formed following World War II. In 1946, Hoverfly R-4Bs began operating from the base's playing fields, which were transformed into a landing ground. In 1959, RNAS Portland was officially established as part of HMS Osprey, further land having been reclaimed from the Mere the previous year to serve as a runway and landing area, and the old canteen building having been adapted to serve as a combined headquarters and control tower. It went on to become the largest naval helicopter airfield in Europe.

==== Closure ====
The Ministry of Defence continued to invest in HMNB Portland until the late 1980s; however in 1991 the closure was announced of both the naval base and the research establishments on Portland as part of defence spending cuts following the end of the Cold War. There was opposition against the closure from the local economy, as well as all ranks of naval personnel, who felt Portland's surrounding coast was perfect for exercising ships.

Royal Navy operations ceased on 21 July 1995 and the harbour was sold on 29 March 1996. FOST was relocated to Devonport. Following this, RNAS Portland also closed in October 1999. The combined closure of all Portland-based establishments was believed to have cost the area 4,500 jobs, along with a loss of £40 million in the area's economy, according to a study carried out for Weymouth and Portland Borough Council in 1995.

== Modern port ==
Langham Industries bought the site from the Ministry of Defence in 1996.

As of 2016, the harbour is the fourth largest human-made port in the world, after the Port of Jebel Ali in Dubai, Ras Laffan Harbour in Qatar and Cherbourg Harbour in France. The breakwaters lead to a restricted water exchange; this in turn leads to elevated water temperatures. Thus several marine species inhabit the harbour beyond the typical northern limits of their range. The harbour is designated as EU shellfish water and supports an important shellfish fishery and a marine ecosystem of high importance for biodiversity.

The harbour was sold off by the Royal Navy in 1996, allowing it to be used both as a centre for water sports and as a service facility for Channel shipping. Portland Port Ltd, formed in December 1994, took possession of the site immediately and their purchase was completed on 12 December 1996. The company aimed to develop the ship repair, leisure and tourism potential of the harbour. One of the first arrivals at the new set up was a prison ship HM Prison Weare, which remained in use until 2006. Renamed Jascon 27, the ship left Portland under tow in 2010, bound for Nigeria, to be refurbished for use as an oil industry accommodation vessel.

Portland Port Group became Statutory Harbour Authority for Portland Harbour on 1 January 1998, replacing the Queen's Harbour Master. In 2004 changes led to Portland Harbour Authority Ltd becoming the Statutory and Competent Harbour Authority and Portland Port Ltd the Port Operator. The commercial port has expanded since its initial establishment; the Britannia Passenger Terminal was opened by HRH Prince Philip on 14 July 1999. In April 2000 the contract was signed for a new bunkering jetty and berth, which came into service in 2005. However, despite published reports in 1996 revealing that Portland Port Ltd were interested in the renovation of historic coastal fortifications in the area, no restoration of any kind has taken place.

Commercial activities on the water include specialist diving services for vessels and repairs and maintenance, as well as a bunkering (fuelling) station. The port is used by all kinds of vessels, from commercial ships such as bulkers, tankers, container carriers car carriers, survey and reefers etc. to British and foreign naval vessels. Commercial activities on the land of the dock estate include fuel storage, natural gas storage, several engineering facilities and a shellfish specialist.

The Portland Harbour Revision Order 2010 provides for the creation of new berths and hardstand areas at the port in order to allow increased commercial activities over the next 50 years. These new facilities have been identified as part of a master plan and business strategy developed by Portland Port. The development is designed to increase berthing opportunities and provide more operational land.

The four identified areas for development are:

- Britannia Terminal Area
- North of Coaling Pier Island
- Camber Quay Development
- Floating Dry Dock Development at Queen's Pier

The port also sees various cruise ship calls bringing visitors to the Dorset area. The Britannia Cruise Terminal, which was opened in July 1999 and again refurbished in 2005, has seen the likes of Royal Caribbean, Azamara, Club Cruises, Saga and Crystal Cruises use it as a start point for excursions in the wider Dorset region and beyond. In recent years the number of cruise ship calls at the port have increased.

In September 2022, a project costing £26m for a deep-water berth upgrade was due to begin, intended to be completed by May 2023.

In April 2023, the Government of the United Kingdom announced highly controversial plans to moor the Bibby Stockholm, on charter from Bibby Marine, at the port to accommodate 500 asylum seekers.

== Recreation ==
The harbour is a popular location for Kiteboarding, wind surfing, wreck diving and sailing. Weymouth and Portland National Sailing Academy which hosted sailing events in the 2012 Olympic Games, is located on the south-western shore of the harbour. The Royal Yachting Association had expressed interest in securing a suitable site locally for a number of decades, in order to make use of the harbour's natural advantages. However the opportunity did not develop until the end of the 20th century, with the withdrawal of the Royal Navy. The academy was established as a not-for-profit company in 1999, and originally operated from various disused military buildings and facilities. In 2003 the academy was able to start redevelopment of the site. In 2005 WPNSA was selected to host the sailing events at the 2012 Olympic and Paralympic Games. Additionally Osprey Quay became an 80 acres regeneration project commissioned by South West Regional Development Agency in 2001. By 2012 Osprey Quay had been transformed with huge investment, offering over 11 hectares, a total of 60,000 square metres of business space.

In October 2007 work commenced on a new marina and recreational boating facility. Some 250,000 tonnes of Portland stone was used in creating the 875m breakwater and associated reclaimed land. This facility was open by Prince Philip, Duke of Edinburgh in April 2009 and is situated directly adjacent to the National Sailing Academy. Apart from the usual freshwater, fuel, shore power and pump-out facilities the marina also has a bar/restaurant, 15 retail/business units and 5 larger commercial units.

In addition to Hood, there are other dive wrecks around the harbour:

- on the inside of the harbour, against a breakwater:
  - Countess of Erme – barge 30 metres north of the Eastern Ship Channel
  - the Spaniard – barge 50 metres south-west of the Chequered Fort
  - a World War II landing craft and a Bombardon Unit, a harbour device intended for the D-Day beaches in Normandy, 50 metres north east of the curve of the south break water
- in "open" water inside the harbour:
  - a Sea Vixen Royal Navy aircraft – a diver training carcass between Ferrybridge and the helicopter base
  - Himalaya – an 1850s passenger liner, which served for many years as a troopship and later as a coal or fuel barge in the centre of the harbour

== Listed buildings and structures ==
The harbour and dockyard has various buildings and structures on the National Heritage List.

The inner breakwater, with its jetty, former victualling store and Inner Pierhead Fort, are Grade II Listed. The victualling store was built around 1850. At the south-west end of Prince Consort Walk is a carved commemorative stone for the completion of the breakwaters in 1872. The outer breakwater is also Grade II Listed.

East Weare Battery was built in the 1860s to protect the harbour. In addition to this, The 'E' section of the battery is Grade II Listed and has become a scheduled monument too. East Weare Camp is Grade II Listed. One of the most dominant of the defence structures is the Portland Breakwater Fort, located on one of the outer breakwaters. It is Grade II Listed.

In 1993, the Dockyard Offices became Grade II Listed. At the end of Castletown village is the former Dockyard Police Station – also Grade II Listed. At the top of the Incline Road is the abandoned Old Engine Shed that once served the cable-operated inclined railway that ran to Castletown through the Navy Dockyard that is now Portland Port. The shed has been Grade II Listed since 2001.

== Breakwater defences ==
Situated across Portland Harbour's four breakwater arms are various defensive structures and related monuments. Many of these are still in existence today, however are derelict and remain unopened to the public. At the Breakwater Fort is a World War II 29 millimetre spigot mortar emplacement, a pillbox, and a battery observation post. Further along the same arm, towards Portland, are two World War II coast artillery searchlights.

On the northeast breakwater, at the southern end, directly opposite the fort, is the Portland Breakwater Lighthouse. The site was also the location of a coastal battery, known as A Pier Head Battery, which opened in 1901 and was armed with two 12-pounder quick-firing (QF) guns for anti-torpedo craft defence. In 1944 emplacements were constructed to replace the 12-pounder guns with 6-pounders. A World War I torpedo station was also located on 'A' Head, using two 18 inch torpedo tubes which were operational from 1915 until 1918. It was put into operation again during World War II. During World War II a petroleum warfare site consisting of four flame throwers were located on 'A' Head. A World War II battery observation post survives.

On the North Eastern Breakwater, within the centre area, is a World War II coastal battery with coast artillery searchlights. Further along the arm is a 29 millimetre spigot mortar emplacement. On the far end of the North Eastern Breakwater, on the Weymouth side, is the site of B Pier Head Battery. The coastal battery opened in 1901 and was armed with two 12-pounder quick-firing (QF) guns for anti-torpedo craft defence. By 1913 the battery's armament included four 12-pounder guns and a 6-inch breech-loading (BL) Mk. VII gun. The battery was decommissioned in 1934. The same site featured a World War I torpedo station. Additionally there is a World War I battery observation post.

The Weymouth end breakwater features the C Pier Head Battery on the southern tip. The arm is known as the Bincleaves Groyne. The battery was opened in 1901 and was armed with two 12-pounder quick-firing (QF) guns for anti-torpedo craft defence. By the First World War the 12-pounder guns had been removed and replaced with a 6-inch breech-loading (BL) Mk. VII gun. The 6-inch gun was removed in 1924 and in 1934 two 12-pounder guns were transferred across from the recently decommissioned B Pier Head. In 1944 emplacements were constructed for two 6-pounder guns, but the guns were not mounted for a number of years. At the C Pier Head Battery a World War II petroleum warfare site was constructed. On site is a World War II 29 millimetre spigot mortar emplacement.

== On-shore defences ==
Aside from the East Weare Battery, and other related constructions, there are a number of defences built within the harbour's dockyard and surrounding area.

During World War II, a number of anti-invasion structures were placed at Balaclava Bay, including an anti boat landing obstacle, and a minefield. A little further south is a coast artillery searchlight. Another coast artillery searchlight was situated further south of this. A number of pillboxes were built around East Weare Battery.

As part of the defence for HMS Osprey, now demolished, a "Yarnold Sanger" pillbox is located on Incline Road, constructed during the Cold War. In addition to this a World War II pillbox, with a possible machine gun post, is located at Upper Osprey.

== See also ==
- Bincleaves Groyne
- Port of Portland Police
- Bibby Stockholm
