= Grade II listed buildings in Dorset =

There are many Grade II listed buildings in the county of Dorset. This is a list of them.

== Bournemouth ==
Name	Location	Type	Completed	Date designated	Entry number	Image
280-286 Poole Lane	West Howe	Residential	1850	27 February 1976	1108850	
310 and 312 Poole Lane	West Howe	Residential	1850	22 March 1971	1153432	
Bournemouth Community Hebrew Congregation	Lansdowne	Synagogue	1911	30 January 2019	1452943	
Bournemouth Daily Echo building	Richmond Hill	Building	1932	1 June 1994	1140113	
Bournemouth Gardens	Town centre	Garden	1840	19 December 1986	1000724	
Bournemouth Natural Science Society	Lansdowne	Musueum	1865	27 February 1976	1324715	
Bournemouth Town Hall	Town centre	Town hall	1885	11 December 2001	1389612	
Brookside and Brookside Cottage	Town centre	Hotel	1850			
Church of All Saints	Southbourne	Church	1914			
East Cliff Church	East Cliff	Church				
Gresham Court Hotel	East Cliff	Hotel				
Gulliver’s Tavern	Kinson	Pub				
Pavilion Theatre	Town centre	Theatre				
Royal Bath Hotel	Town centre	Hotel				
Royal Exeter Hotel	Town centre	Hotel	1811-1812	5 May 1952	1108862	
St Alban's Church	Charminster	Church				
St Andrew's Church, Boscombe, Dorset	Boscombe	Church				
St Andrew's Church, Malmesbury Park	Malmesbury Park	Church				
St Augustin's Church	Charminster	Church				
St Francis of Assisi's Church	Charminster	Church				
St James's Church	Pokesdown	Church				
St Katharine's Church	Southbourne	Church				
St Luke's Church	Winton	Church				
St Mark's Church	Talbot Village	Church				
St Mark's Church of England Primary School	Talbot Village	School				
St Mary's Church	Springbourne	Church	1934			
Wimborne Road Cemetery	Charminster	Cemetery	1878			

== Christchurch ==
Listed buildings in Christchurch, Dorset#Grade II

- The Town Hall, Christchurch

== East Dorset ==
- Longham United Reformed Church

== North Dorset ==
- Lady Wimborne Bridge

== Poole ==
- Crown Hotel
- Packe family mausoleum
- Poole Civic Centre
- St Peter's Primary School, Poole

== Purbeck ==
- Clavell Tower
- Castle Inn
- Fort Henry
- Square and Compass, Worth Matravers
- Swanage Town Hall

== West Dorset ==
Name	Location	Type	Completed	Date designated	Entry number	Image
Beaminster Tunnel	Beaminster	Tunnel				
Bridport Arts Centre	Bridport	Arts centre				
Dorset Martyrs Memorial	Dorchester	Memorial				
Newell House School	Sherborne	School				
Pier Terrace	West Bay	Residential				
Thomas Hardy Statue	Dorchester	Statue				
Three Cups Hotel	Lyme Regis	Hotel				
Town Walks	Dorchester	Roman walls				

== Weymouth and Portland ==
- Brewers Quay (since 1974)
- Custom House
- Jubilee Clock Tower
- Mulberry Harbour Phoenix Units
- Old Higher Lighthouse
- Old Lower Lighthouse
- Pennsylvania Castle
- Portland Bill Lighthouse
- Portland Cenotaph
- Portland House, Weymouth
- Portland Windmills
- Portwey Hospital
- Riviera Hotel, Weymouth
- Rossi's
- Royal Hotel, Weymouth
- St George's Centre
- Statue of Queen Victoria, Weymouth
- The Captain's House
- The Cove House Inn
- The George Inn, Portland
- The Old Engine Shed, Portland
- The Old Rectory, Fortuneswell
- Trinity House Obelisk
- Verne Cistern
- Verne High Angle Battery
- Wellington Court
- Weymouth Old Town Hall
- Weymouth Town Bridge
- Wyke Castle
- Wyke Regis War Memorial

== See also ==
- Grade I listed buildings in Dorset
- Grade II* listed buildings in Dorset
