= Tout (disambiguation) =

In British English, a tout is any person who solicits business or employment in a persistent and annoying manner.

Tout may also refer to:

- Tout (surname)
- Tout (company), a social networking and microblogging service
- Tout Quarry, a former quarry and sculpture park in Dorset, England, in the United Kingdom
