= Royal Naval Hospital, Portland =

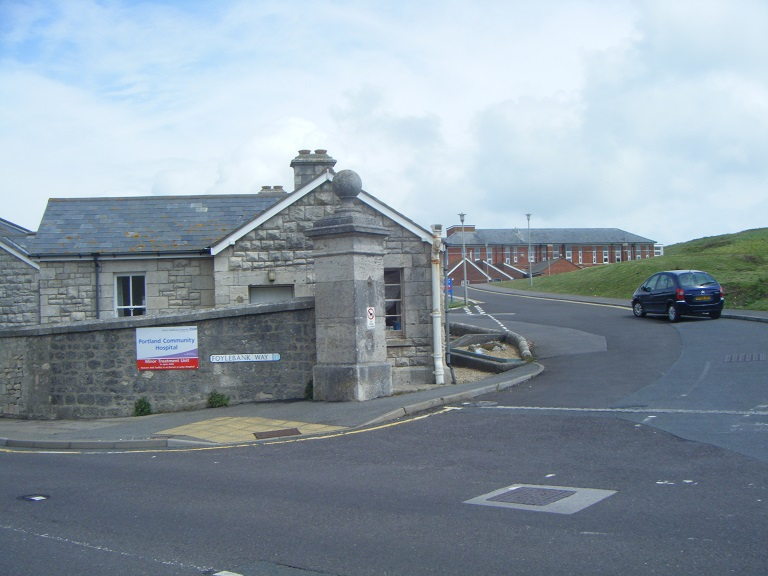
- The entrance of the Portland Community Hospital, with the hospital itself in the background.

- Shown in Dorset

Geography
- Location: Portland, England
- Coordinates: 50.5658°N 2.4452°W

Organisation
- Care system: NHS

History
- Founded: 1906
- Closed: 1957

Links
- Lists: Hospitals in England

The Portland Royal Naval Hospital was a naval hospital on the Isle of Portland, Dorset, England. Portland Harbour was a naval anchorage and fuelling facility, which grew to become a Naval Base and Royal Dockyard. A RN Hospital was initially established in the dockyard area in the 1870s, which served until it was replaced by a new purpose-built naval hospital, located close to Castletown, at the beginning of the 20th century. It closed in 1957, when it was handed over to the National Health Service, which still runs the hospital. It is now known as Portland Community Hospital.

== History ==
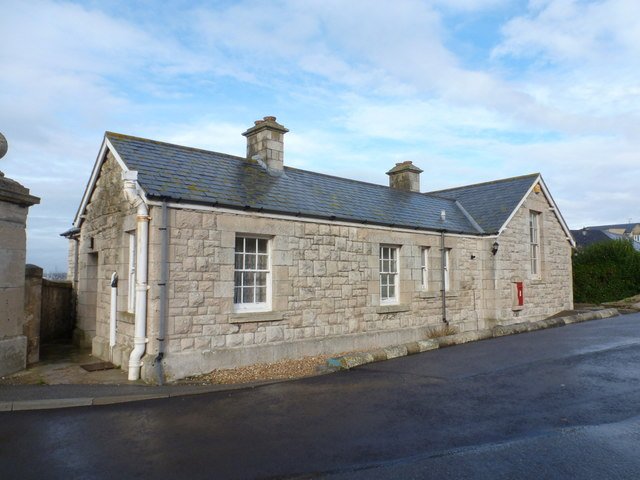
The gatehouse on Castle Hill was originally part of the RN Sick Quarters.

After completion of the southern breakwaters in 1872, a large building (within what later became the Royal Dockyard area) was converted into a hospital; By 1890 it consisted of two blocks, with 76 beds. In the 1880s a separate R.N. Sick Quarters was laid out, between Castle Road and the Merchant's Railway; while in 1899-1900 a new zymotic (infectious diseases) hospital was built, just to the east of the Sick Quarters, on the opposite side of the incline.

With naval use of the harbour continuing to increase, plans were drawn up in 1901 for a new general hospital to be built at Castle Road (on higher ground directly south of the sick quarters). Completed by 1906, it was made up of an officers' block, administration block, kitchen, surgical block and medical block all linked by a covered walkway. The nearby buildings of the R.N. Sick Quarters were converted or rebuilt to provide staff accommodation (and other ancillary facilities). Portland Hospital Halt, an un-timetabled station on the Easton and Church Hope Railway, provided railway access to the site. Once the new hospital was open the old hospital buildings in the dockyard were converted into torpedo workshops.

During World War II, an underground operating theatre was constructed. Along with the surgical block, it was the only section of the hospital to be in full-time operation. After suffering bomb damage in 1940, a decision was made for as many patients as possible to be moved to a less vulnerable site. Minterne House, located at Minterne Magna in Dorchester, was requisitioned for this purpose, leaving Portland's hospital to become a casualty and emergency hospital only. Despite this, it would receive 5,222 inpatients over the course of the war.

The hospital became surplus to requirements and was handed over to the National Health Service in 1957. (At the same time the Isolation Hospital was closed and converted into married quarters for the Admiralty Constabulary). The underground operating theatre, although rewired during 1954–5, was then stripped of much of its equipment. In 1996, the Portland Rotary were successful in gaining access to the theatre for a weekend of public tours. Steel gates were then put on the tunnel entrances and the theatre has remained closed to the public since.

== The hospital today ==
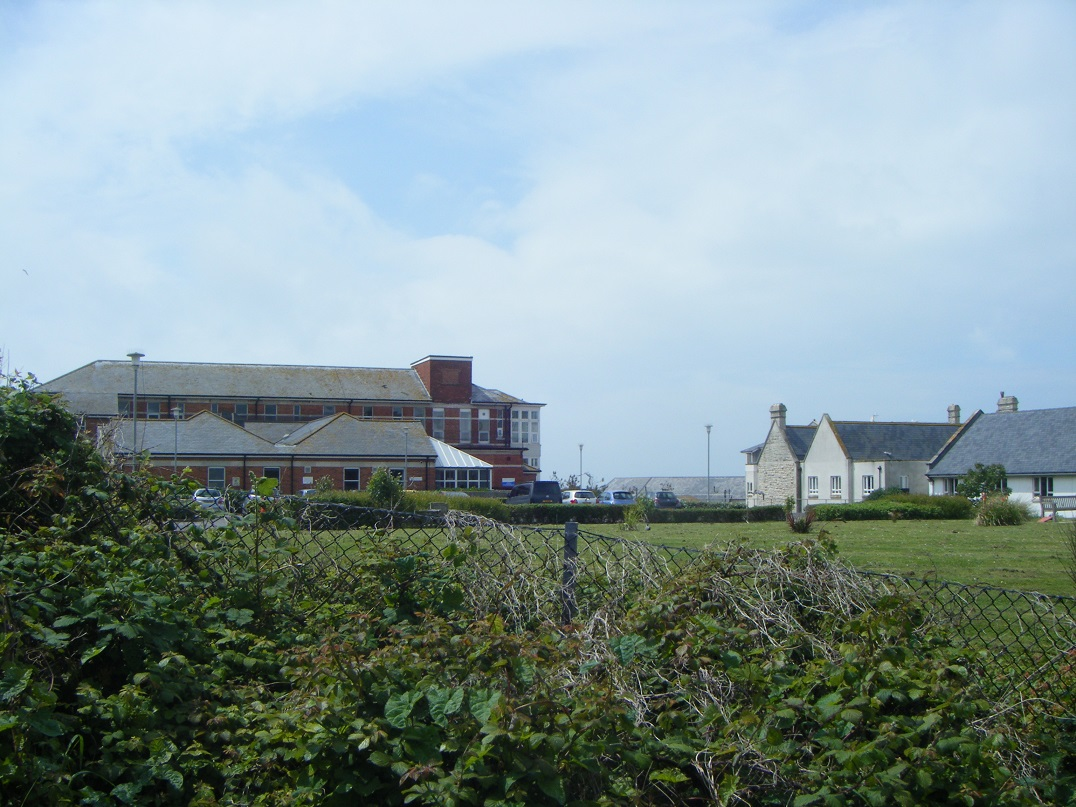
The hospital today, seen from the Merchant's Railway incline.

The hospital remains in NHS use as Portland Community Hospital. Most of the Edwardian hospital buildings survived into the 1990s, but today only a single pavilion ward remains.

By 2005, some out-buildings of the hospital site were demolished to make way for Foylebank Way, a residential area for the elderly above 55 years of age. This incorporates the old Principal Medical Officer's residence, formerly part of the R.N. Sick Quarters.

Another surviving building from the Sick Quarters is the old Porter's Lodge and Mortuary complex, which today houses the Gatehouse Medical Centre.

== See also ==
- Healthcare in Dorset
- List of hospitals in England
