= Villages of Portland =

There are eight settlements on the Isle of Portland, Dorset, England, the largest of which are Fortuneswell in Underhill and Easton on Tophill. The other villages of Weston, Southwell, Wakeham and the Grove also occupy Tophill, and Castletown and Chiswell are the other villages in Underhill.

== Tophill ==
=== Southwell ===
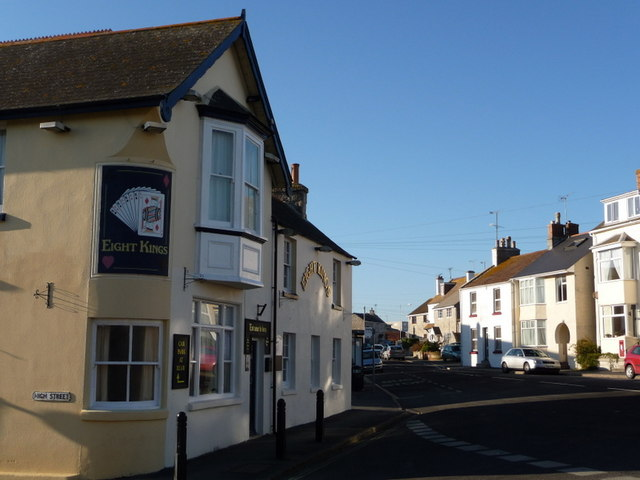
Terraced houses and a pub in Southwell

Southwell 50°32′N 2°27′W is a small coastal village in Tophill on the Isle of Portland, Dorset, between Portland Bill and the village of Easton. Like many of the other villages on Portland, Southwell has commercial industry (Southwell Business Park). The village has one All-Through School, Atlantic Academy Portland. This includes one of two primary schools and the only secondary school on the island.

=== Easton ===
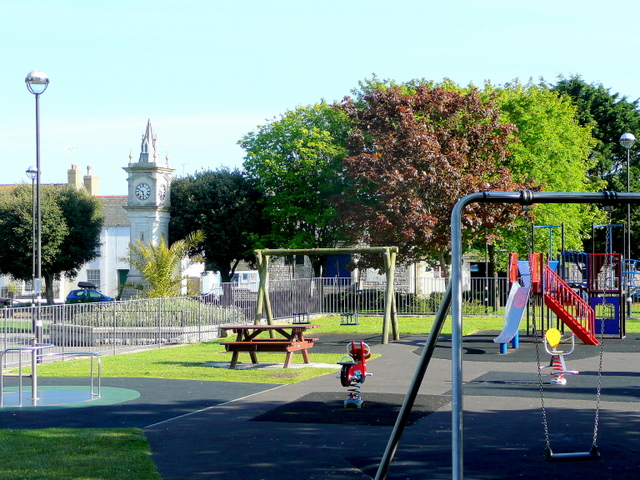
The Square, Easton

Easton 50°33′N 2°26′W is the second largest of eight villages on the Isle of Portland in Dorset, England. The village is situated on the top of the island or Tophill, in the English Channel, and was where the Easton Massacre took place. The village has a small square with many shops and shopping arcade, four churches, a small park, and other amenities. At the south end of Easton is Portland Museum. Along with Fortuneswell, Easton is the main hub of the Isle of Portland's activities.

=== The Grove ===
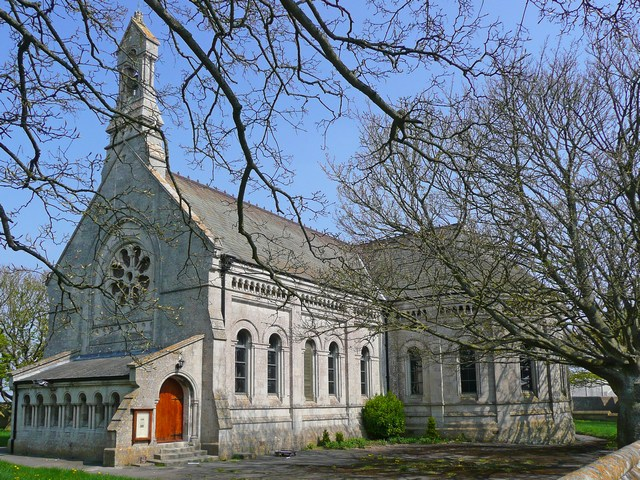
St Peter's Church, The Grove

The Grove is a small village near Easton containing HMP Portland, the Young Offenders Institution.

=== Wakeham ===
Wakeham is a small village near the village of Easton, in Tophill on the Isle of Portland in Dorset, England.

=== Weston ===
Weston 50°32′22.96″N 2°26′50.24″W is a village in Tophill on the Isle of Portland, Dorset, England. It is on the outskirts of the main village Easton, and near also to the village of Southwell. Weston contains a Roman Villa - one of the few archaeological sites on the Isle of Portland, which is opposite the site of the previous Royal Manor Arts College.

== Underhill ==
=== Fortuneswell ===
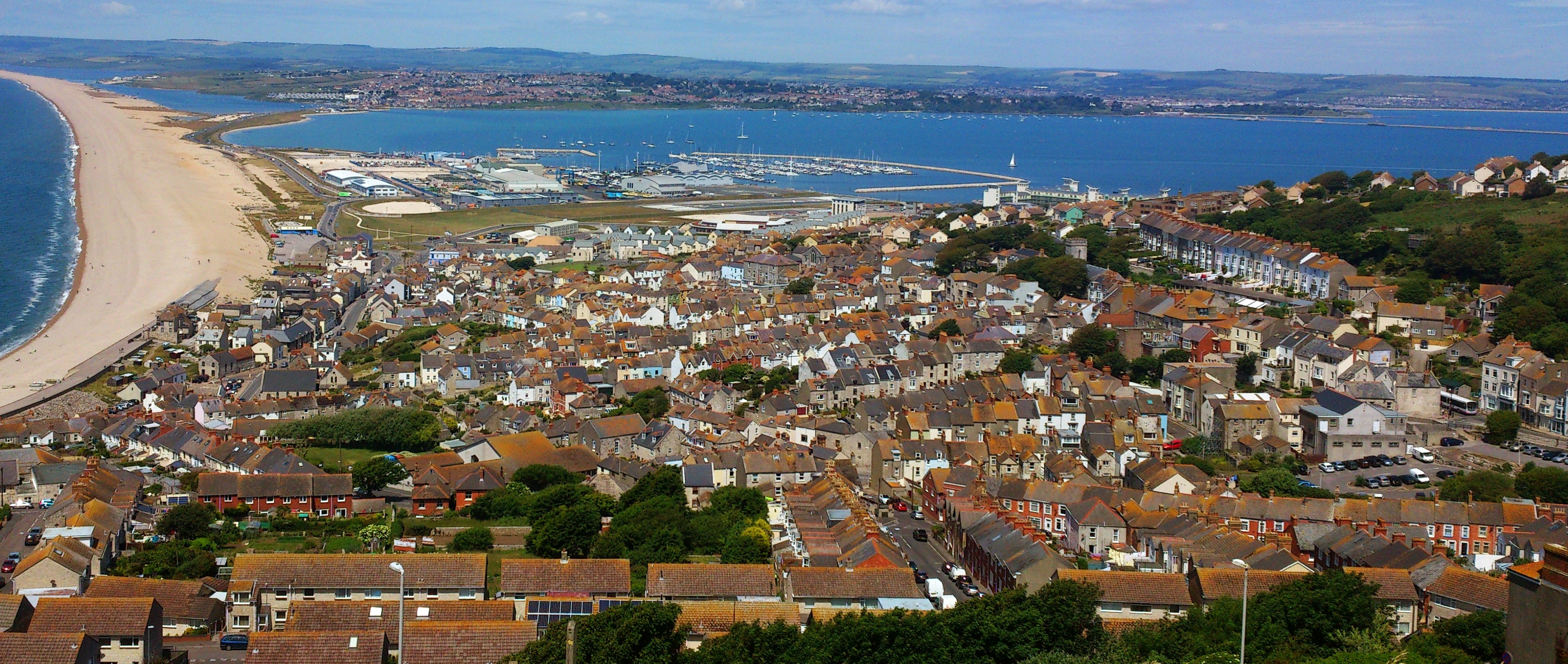
Chesil Beach from the hill above Fortuneswell, with much of the village in the foreground.

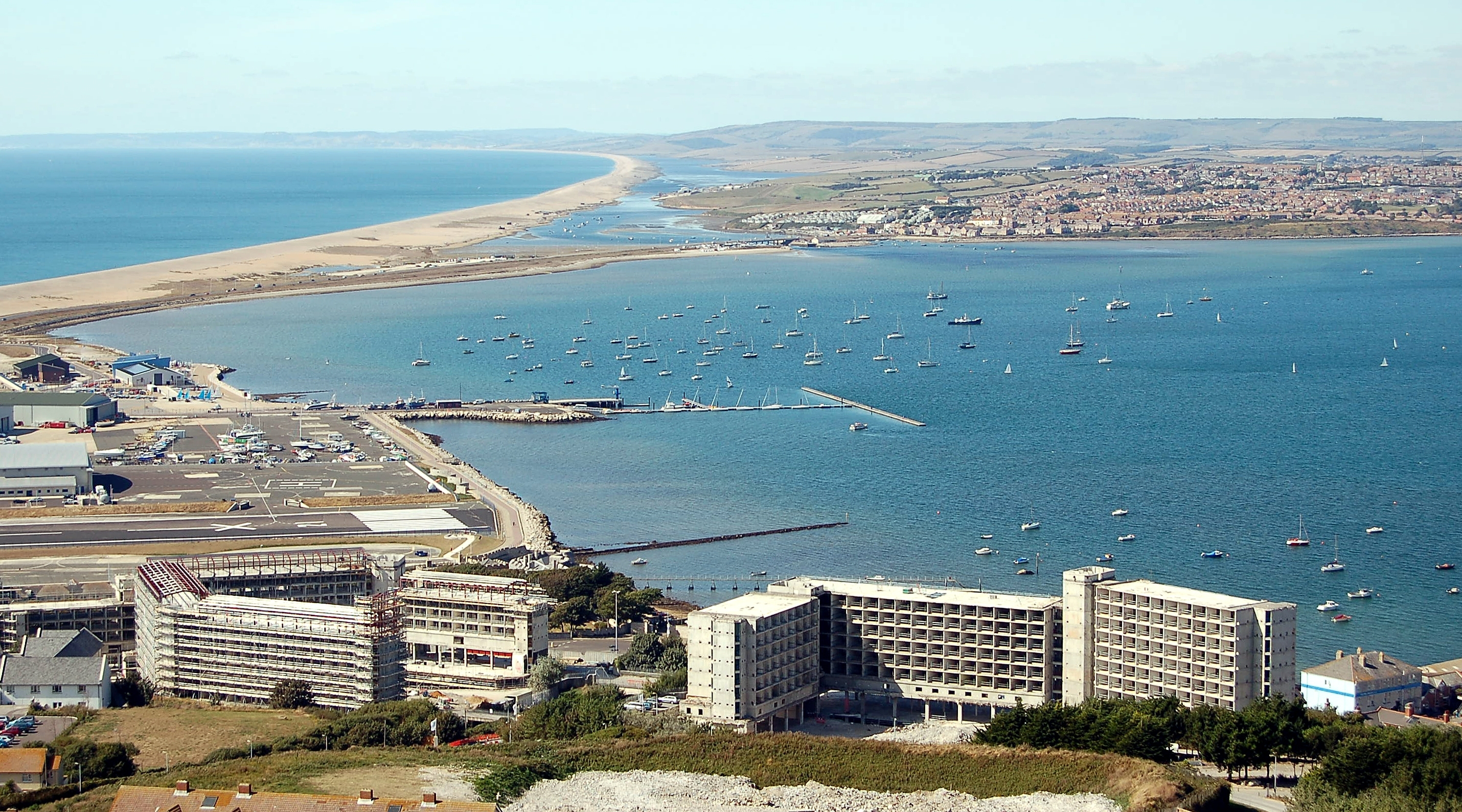
Fortuneswell and Portland Harbour, seen from The Verne. The Weymouth and Portland National Sailing Academy is on the left.

Fortuneswell is the largest of eight villages on the Isle of Portland, just off the coast of Dorset in the English Channel. The village lies on steeply sloping land on the northern edge of the island (Underhill), where Chesil Beach, the tombolo which connects the island to the mainland, joins the island.

The village has a main shopping street with several shops. The nearby villages of Chiswell and Castletown almost merge into Fortuneswell, as they share the limited space on the northern slopes of the island. However, Fortuneswell occupies the steepest land far above sea level, whereas Castletown and Chiswell occupy flat land close to sea level, next to Portland Harbour and Chesil Beach respectively.

=== Castletown ===
Castletown is a small village in Underhill on the Isle of Portland in Dorset. It has a sandy beach and has a working port, Portland Port. The village itself is on the shores of Portland Harbour, and includes Portland Castle and the Weymouth and Portland National Sailing Academy. The village has a long naval history, and the Royal Navy had a base in the harbour until 1999. Now Portland Port is commercial, whilst still servicing and berthing Royal Fleet Auxiliary ships.

=== Chiswell ===
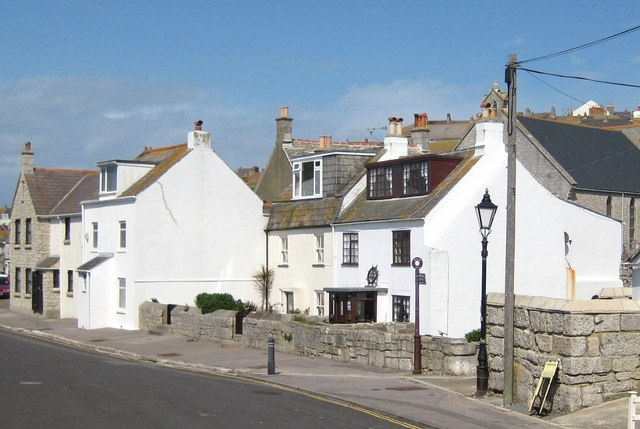
Cottages on Brandy Row in Chiswell

Chiswell (rarely Chesilton) is a small fishing village at the southern end of Chesil Beach, in Underhill. The small bay at Chiswell is called Chesil Cove.

The village itself is indistinguishable from Fortuneswell, the largest village on the island, as the two settlements are very close. However this distinction can be made: Chiswell occupies flat land close to sea level, whereas Fortuneswell's streets wind up and down the steep hills.

Over the centuries Chiswell has battled with the sea and has been regularly flooded during rough winter storms which can over top the 15 metres (49 ft) high Chesil Beach which protects the village. Flood defences were installed during the 1980s to alleviate the problems, although storms do still breach them, as in the winter months of 2014.
