= Tout Quarry =

Sculpture park and nature reserve in Dorset, England

Coordinates: 50.5531°N 2.4446°W

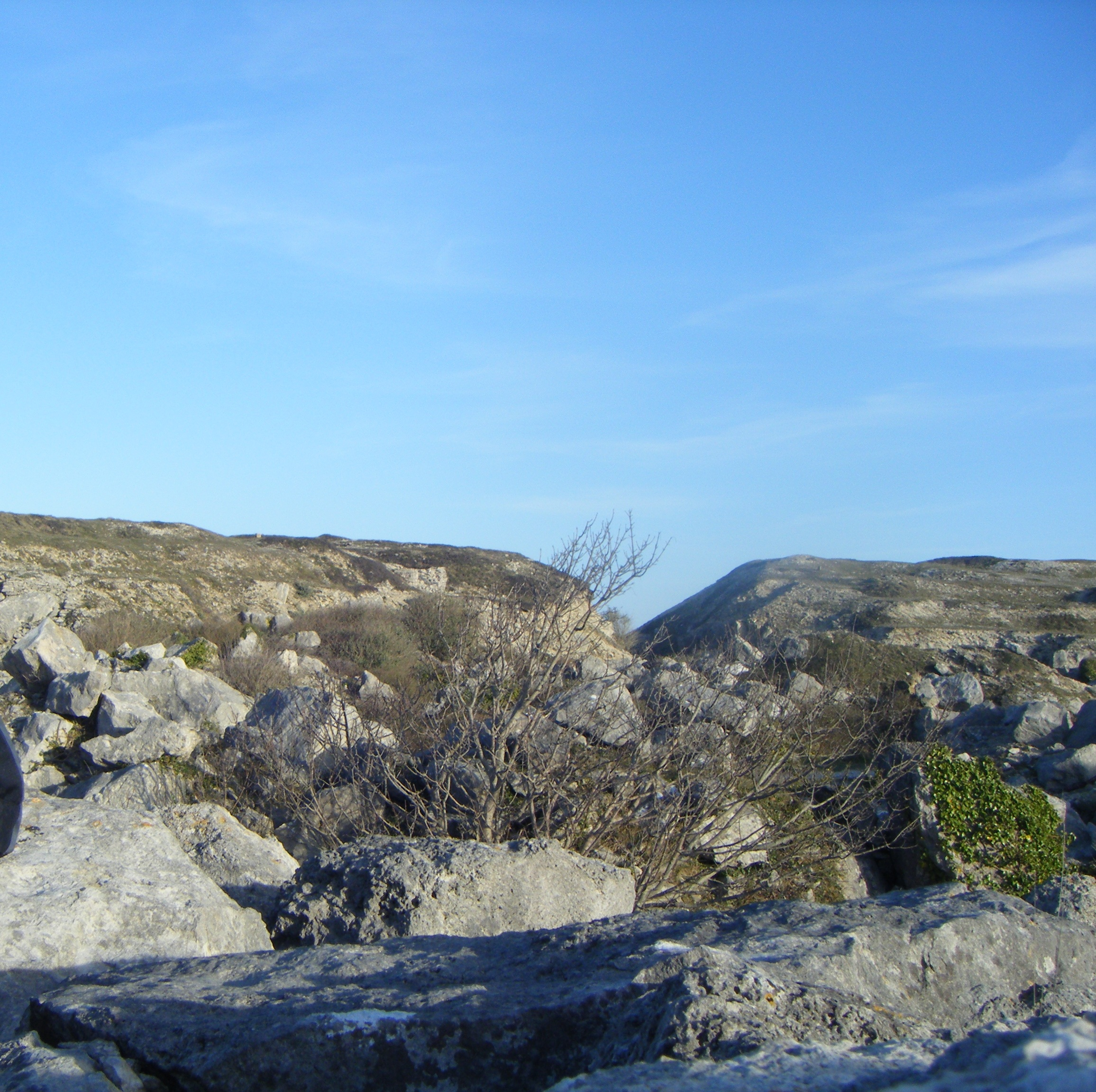
Part of Tout Quarry's landscape

Tout Quarry, now known as Tout Quarry Sculpture Park and Nature Reserve, is a sculpture park and nature reserve based within a disused quarry on the Isle of Portland, Dorset, England. It is located within the north-west corner of Tophill. The sculpture park has existed since 1983, while the site also become a nature reserve around 2004. To date, the quarry displays a collection of various carvings and works in Portland stone.

== Background ==
Tout Quarry was worked commercially during the 18th and 19th centuries. The quarry was last worked in 1982 for a boulder contract when 30,000 tons were excavated for sea defenses. Portland Sculpture & Quarry Trust began the sculpture park in 1983, saving the quarry from further mineral extraction with the creation of sculptures, and the park officially opened in that year. Many of the original site-specific sculptures can still be discovered today, although some did not last much longer than a year.

In places around the quarry, there are numerous ravines leading to the cliff edge. Tramway lines once ran throughout the quarry, taking stone waste to the cliff edge to be tipped or taking block stone to Priory Corner where it was transported along the Merchant's Railway to Castletown, from where it as shipped across the world. The Grade II Listed Lano's Bridge was built in the mid-1800s to carry a high level tramway taking stone waste to the cliff edge.

== Portland Sculpture and Quarry Trust ==
The Portland Sculpture and Quarry Trust was formed in 1983 when the quarry was turned into a park. The trust is dedicated to "preserving a knowledge and understanding of all aspects of stone and the landscape from which it comes". It operates within the quarry and at its headquarters at the nearby Drill Hall. An outdoor workshop is located within the quarry and is used to run courses from May to September each year. The yearly programme of stone carving and sculpture courses teaches skills in stone carving, direct carving, lettercutting, relief carving and architectural detail. The indoor workspace at the Drill Hall is also used for this purpose.

In 2008, the Trust was the runner-up in the British Urban Regeneration Association's awards for community-inspired regeneration. In 2009, the Trust was shortlisted for the British Urban Regeneration Awards Scheme.

== Sculptures ==
There is estimated to be over 70 different sculptures within the quarry. These include:

- Dreaming Head and Estuary (by Keir Smith)
- Flow Through the Rocks (by Han Sal Por)
- Representation of a Baroque garden (by Shelagh Wakely)
- Wreck (by Rosie Leventon)
- Philosopher's Stone (by Robert Harding)
- 16 Candles (by David Tuckwell)
- Crouching Figure (by Reiko Nireki)
- Flowing Rocks (by Harry Klar)
- Dry Stone Landscape (by Nick Lloyd)
- The Arena of Fulls (by Kerry Trengove)
- Pterichthys (by Richard Farrington)
- Shrine (by Hiroshi Makimara)
- A Tear for Stone (by anonymous)
- Seat and Boat (by Mike Hick)
- Yogi Seeker (by S. Chandrasekeran)
- Wessex (by Andrews Kirkby)
- Chair (by Simon Foster-Ogg)
- Serpent Steps and Alignment (by Christine Fox)
- Among the Stars that Hide and Seek (by Alain Ayres)
- Sentimental Arch (by Barbara Ash)
- Cornucopia (by Clare Stratton)
- Mirrored Sun (by Chris O'Neil & students from Wimbledon School of Art)
- A Homage to Lichen (by Patrick Howett)
- Sunstone (by Phil Nicol)
- Flying the Kite (by Mary Kenny)
- Window (by Justin Nicol)
- Iguana (by John Roberts)
- Chesil (by Chris O'Neil)
- Stone Whirlpool (by Amanda Glover)
- Stitch in Time (by Graham Westfield)
- Vessel (by Gerard Wilson)
- Fallen Fossil (by Stephen Marsden)
- Orobous (by Jan Nunn)
- Ascent (by Joe Hamilton)
- Stone of the Summer Solstice (by Roger Davies)
- Plant Form (by Sylvia Stuart)
- Waterfall (by Hamish Horsley)
- Calendar Stone (by Barry Mason)
- History Lesson (by Angelo Bordonan)
- Zen Garden (by Phillip King & students from the Royal College of Art)
- From the Ruins (by Lorna Green)
- Water Bowl (by Valerie Josephs)
- Woman on Rock (by Dhruva Mistry)
- Be Stone No More (by Pierre Vivant)
- Still Falling (by Antony Gormley)
- Ribbed Form (by David Kelly)
- Leaning Torso (by Hennie Hansel)
- Hearth (by Timothy Shutter)
- Drinking Bowl (by Jonathan Sells)
- Horizontal Figure (by anonymous)
- The Green Man (by Valentine Quinn)
- Searchlights (by Michael Farrell)
- The Beauty of Surveillance (by James Harries)
- A sort of Stonehenge (by Nicolas Evans)
- Cirkel van Stenen (Stone Circle) (a collection of sculptures by Groupe 85 from the Netherlands)

== See also ==
- Isle of Portland
- Jurassic Coast
- Chesil Beach

== Gallery ==
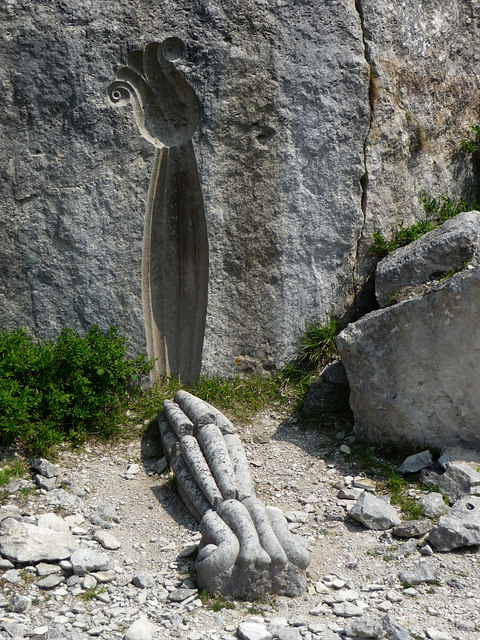
Fallen Fossil by Stephen Marsden

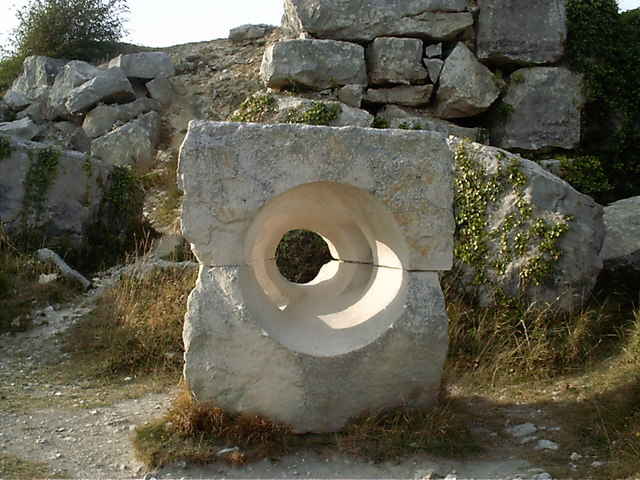
Window by Justin Nicol

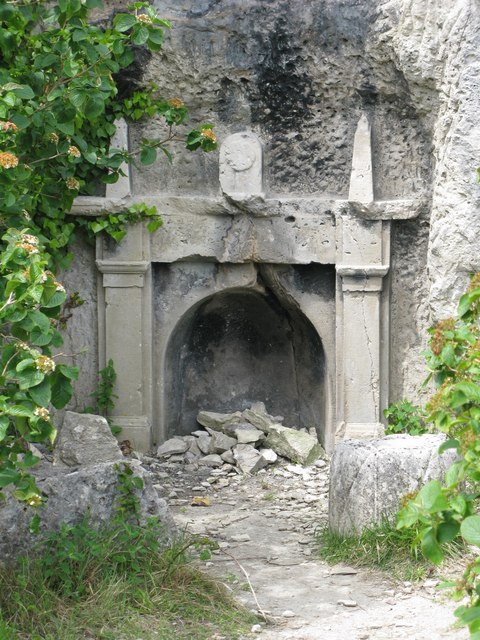
Hearth by Timothy Shutter

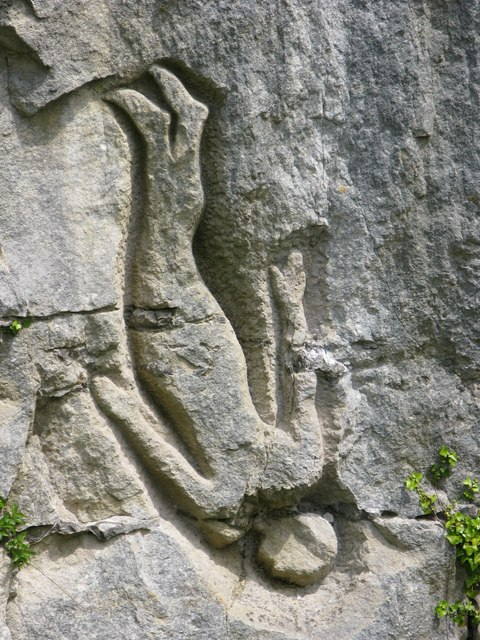
Still Falling by Antony Gormley

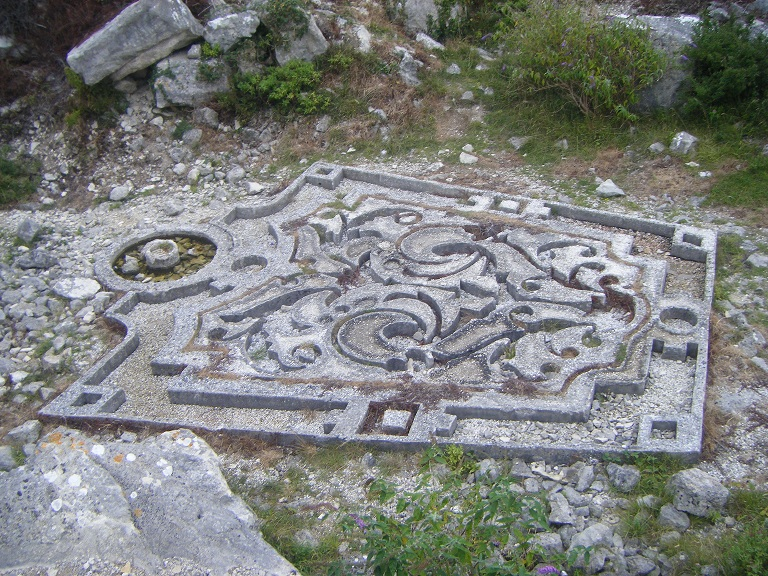
Representation of a Baroque garden by Shelagh Wakely

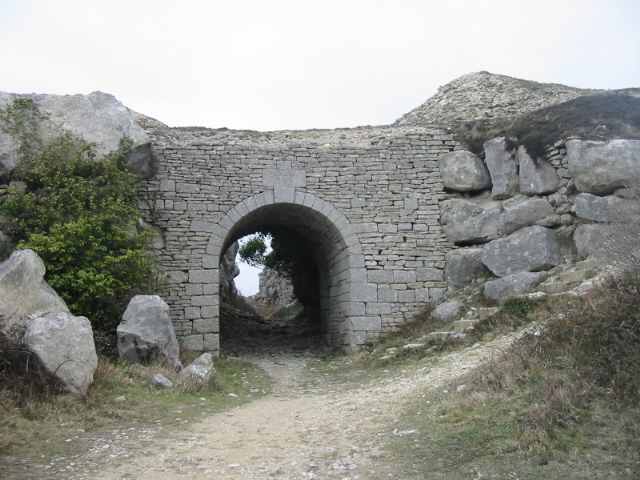
Lano's Bridge

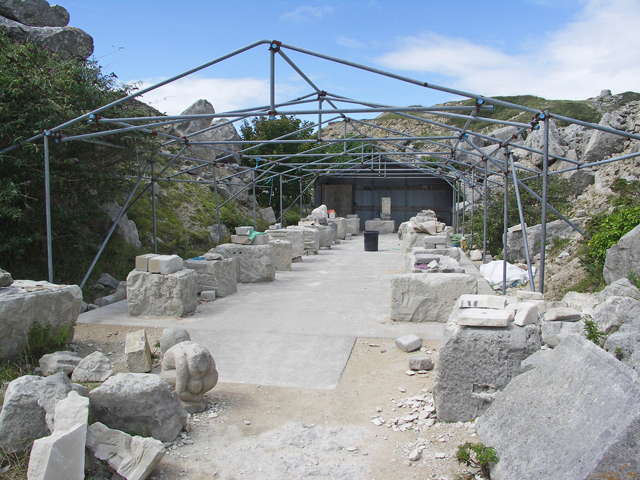
Stone Sculpting Workshop
