= Verne Cistern =

Water supply cistern on the Isle of Portland, Dorset, England

Coordinates: 50.5599°N 2.43798°W

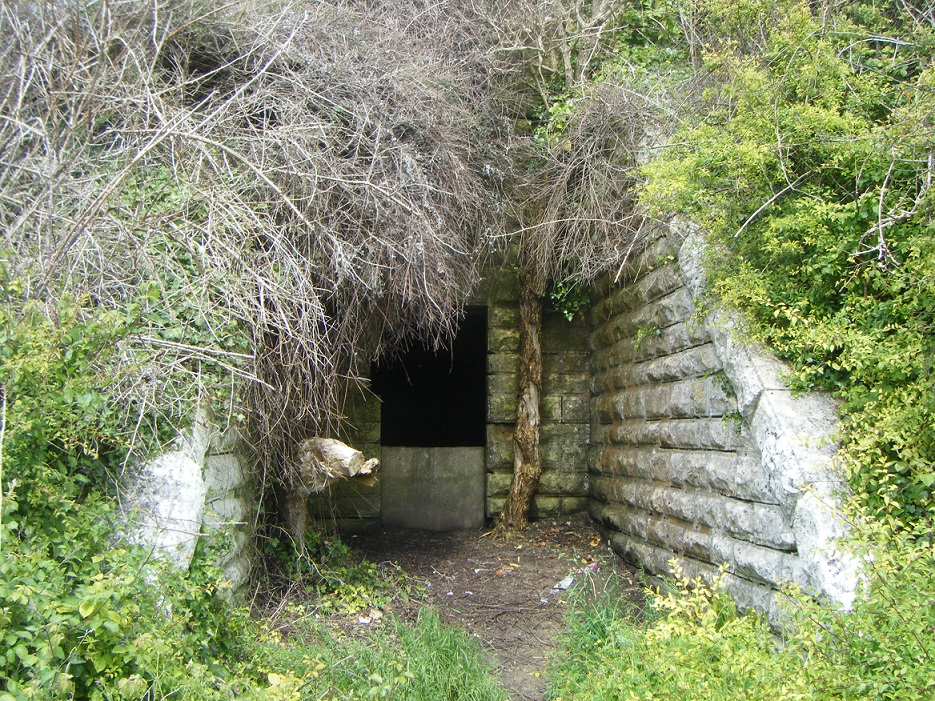
Verne Cistern

Verne Cistern is a water supply cistern on the Isle of Portland, Dorset, England. It is situated at the southern flank of the Verne Ramparts, on the slopes of Verne Hill, along the route of the horse drawn and cable operated Merchant's Railway – now a public footpath. It is on the edge of the Verne Citadel, a 19th-century fort, which is now HM Prison The Verne. The cistern became Grade II Listed in May 1993.

== History ==
Constructed circa 1880, the water supply cistern has a monumental entrance built into the hillside. This cistern evidently served, inter alia, a tank slightly lower on the slope, however this is now concealed by foliage and remains inaccessible.

At the time of construction of the citadel, the southern face of Verne Hill went through remodeling, and this was when an existing fresh water spring head was housed in the cistern's stone retaining wall, cut into the outer wall of the Verne Ditch bank, midway along and adjacent to the upper track. Before the supply of piped water to Portland in the early 20th century, this storage cistern and its works would have been an important installation.

In recent decades the entrance of the cistern has become overgrown and inaccessible, but is often cut back and cleared. The structure is not under care, and remains a victim of vandalism, particularly littering within the interior. It is located on common land, and can be viewed by the public.
