= Gresham Court Hotel =

Building in Bournemouth, Dorset, England

Green House Hotel
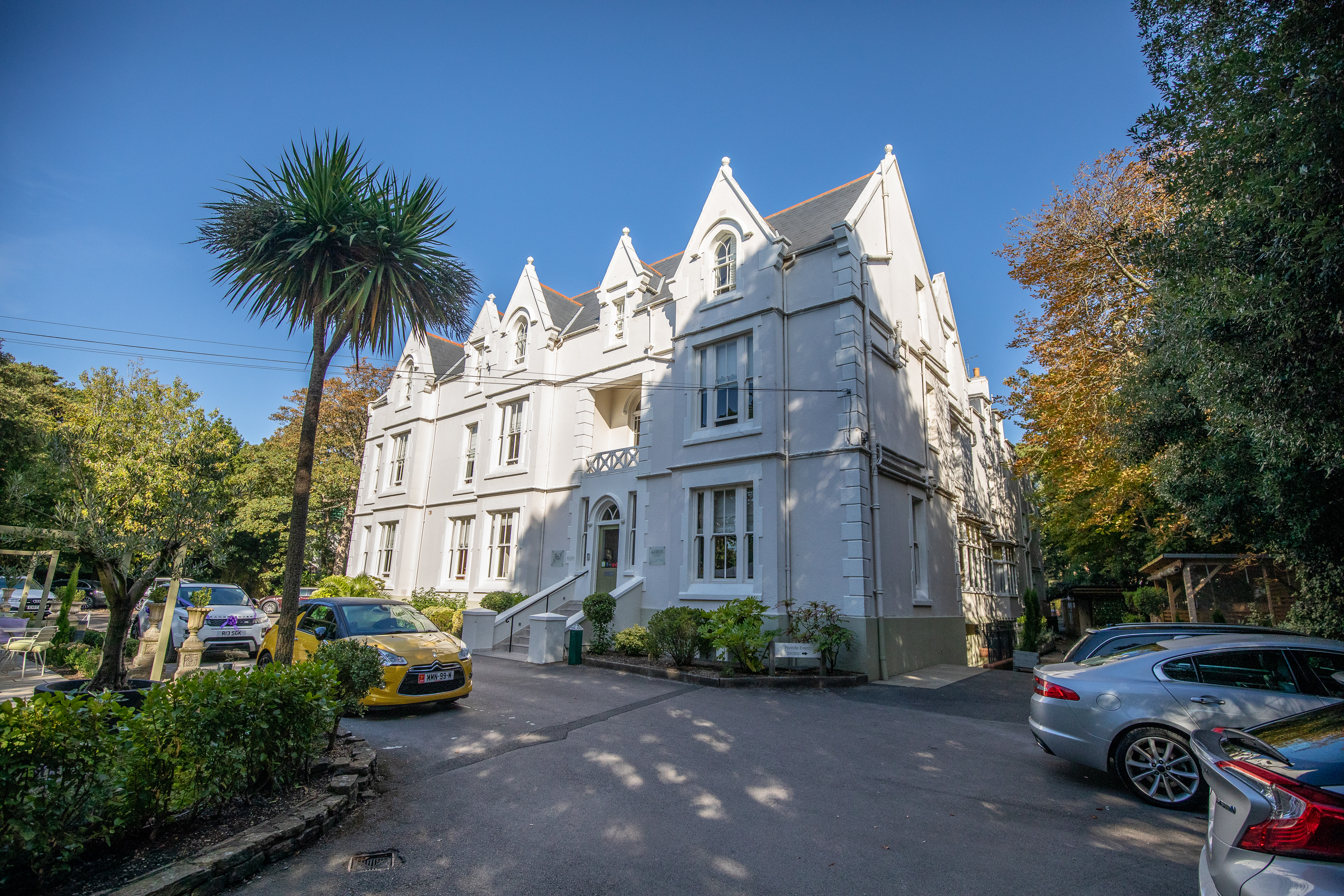
- The hotel in 2019

- Location within Dorset
- Former names: Gresham Court Hotel

General information
- Type: Hotel
- Architectural style: Gothic Revival
- Location: Grove Road, Bournemouth, Dorset, England
- Coordinates: 50.7194°N 1.8682°W
- Year built: c. 1855

Technical details
- Floor count: 3

Website
- thegreenhousehotel.co.uk

Listed Building – Grade II
- Official name: Gresham Court Hotel rear wing of No 4 (Gresham Court Hotel)
- Designated: 1 August 1974
- Reference no.: 1148266

The Gresham Court Hotel, now known as the Green House Hotel, is a historic building on Grove Road in Bournemouth, Dorset, England. It is scheduled as a Grade II listed building by Historic England.

== History ==
The hotel is a stucco Gothic-style villa dating to around 1855. The residential property was later converted into a hotel. On 1 August 1974, it became a Grade II listed building including the rear wing of 51 Gervis Road. It is described as a Victorian clifftop villa. In 2006, the hotel appeared on a food television programme. In January 2009, a large fire broke out while it was under renovation. Fifty firefighters responded to the scene. The roof was destroyed and the building was damaged. The hotel was restored and reopened in 2011 as the Green House. The Green House Hotel won the AA Eco friendly hotel of the year award 2012–2013. BBC News reported on the hotel's environmentally friendly features including solar panels, charging for electric vehicles and ozone gas. In 2021, the hotel was put up for sale.

== Gallery ==
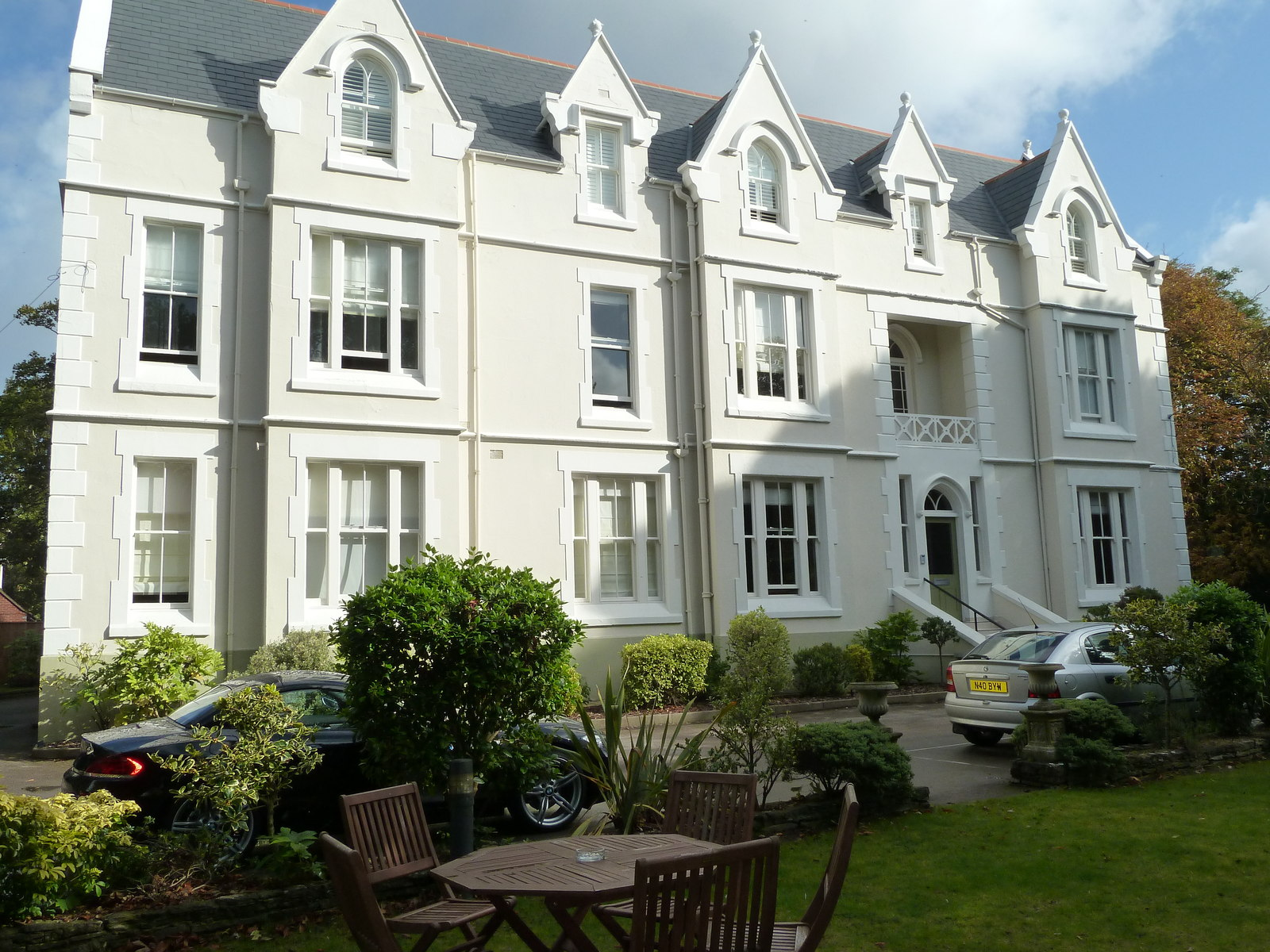
The Green House Hotel in 2011

== See also ==
- Grade II listed buildings in Dorset
- List of hotels in the United Kingdom
