= Square and Compass, Worth Matravers =

Listed pub in Dorset, England

Square and Compass
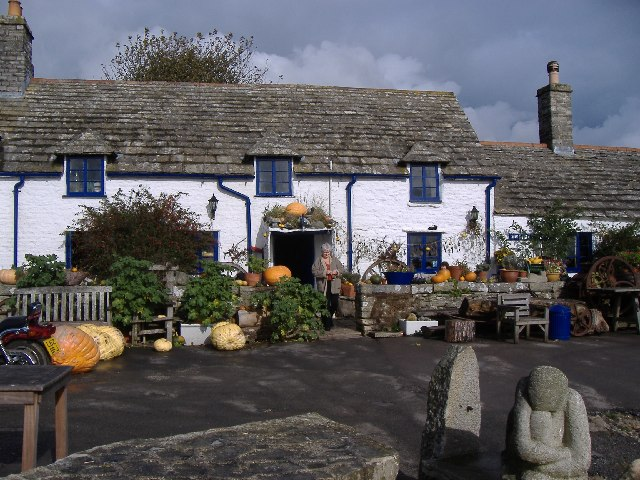
- The pub in 2005
- Former names: The Sloop
- Alternative names: Sqump

General information
- Type: Public house; originally two cottages
- Location: Worth Matravers, Dorset, England
- Coordinates: 50.5978702°N 2.0372565°W
- Year built: 18th century
- Opened: c. 1793; 233 years ago (as a pub)
- Renovated: 19th century (extended)
- Owner: Independent

Design and construction
- Designations

Listed Building – Grade II
- Official name: The Square and Compass
- Designated: 13 December 1984
- Reference no.: 1151928

Website
- squareandcompasspub.co.uk

The Square and Compass is a Grade II listed public house in Worth Matravers, a village in Dorset, England. Originating as cottages by the mid-18th century and converted into an alehouse in the 1790s, it has been operated by the Newman family since 1907. The pub is noted for its largely unaltered interior, which is recognised by the Campaign for Real Ale (CAMRA) as being of "outstanding national historic importance", and for retaining traditional features including serving hatches in place of a bar counter. It also contains a museum displaying fossils and local artefacts.

== History ==
The public house originated by the mid-18th century, possibly as a pair of cottages, and was converted into an alehouse known as The Sloop around 1793 after its acquisition by the brewer Thomas Phippard. It later became associated with local smuggling activity, including reported confrontations between smugglers and excise officers at nearby St Aldhelm's Head. By 1833, the premises was known as the Square and Compass. The pub is named after Square and Compasses, the tools used by carpenters and stonemasons, reflecting the importance of quarrying and stonemasonry to the local economy.

The pub was occupied by stonemason Charles Bower from 1833 and remained under his tenancy for more than four decades before passing to his widow and later a succession of tenants of Strong & Co. In 1907, the tenancy was taken over by the Newman family.

The Square and Compass became a gathering place for artists and writers during the interwar period, including the painter Augustus John. During the Second World War, regular customers included the physicist and astronomer Bernard Lovell and Nobel Prize winners Alan Hodgkin and Martin Ryle, who were working on radar development in the area. The pub was also popular with scientists from the Telecommunications Research Establishment in Purbeck, who referred to it as "Sine" and "Cosine".

On 13 December 1984, the Square and Compass was designated a Grade II listed building. The Newman family purchased the freehold in 1994 after nearly a century as tenants.

The pub was included on the Campaign for Real Ale (CAMRA)'s National Inventory of Historic Pub Interiors before the inventory's grading system was revised. Under the revised scheme, it is rated three stars and its interior is regarded as being "of outstanding national historic importance".

The pub includes a small museum displaying fossils and local artefacts. The artefacts were collected by the current landlord and his father, with most of the fossils having been collected locally.

In 2014, the Square and Compass won The Good Pub Guide award for Unspoilt Pub of the Year. It is one of five pubs known as the "Famous Five", having appeared in all 48 editions of CAMRA's The Good Beer Guide published between 1974 and 2021.

Known as "Sqump" to its regulars, the pub retains a number of traditional features. When the Newman family took over the tenancy in 1907, it had oil lamps, no running water or flushing toilets, and no bar counter. Although electricity and running water have since been installed, there is still no bar counter, and drinks are served through two serving hatches.

== Architecture ==
=== Exterior ===
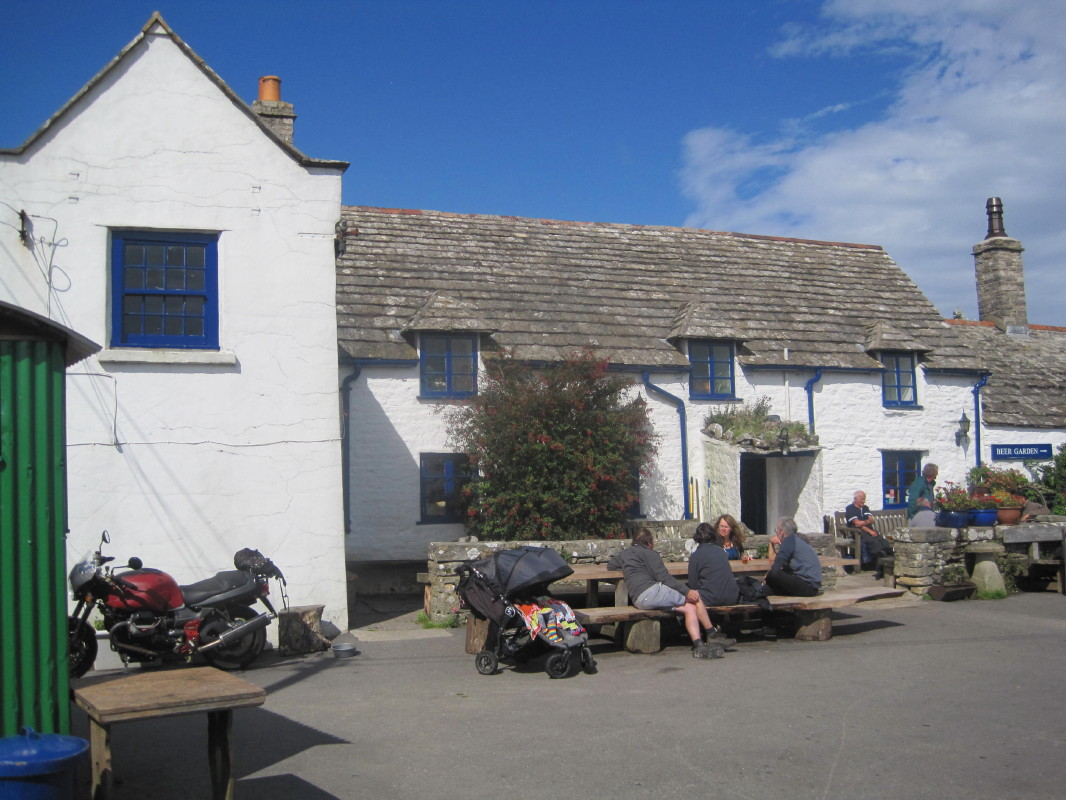
Two-storey wing shown on the left of image

The building is constructed of colourwashed stone rubble with stone slate roofs and stone chimneys. It has an irregular T-shaped layout, comprising a main range with a rear extension, a long wing projecting from the western end, and an adjoining range to the east with a later extension at the rear.

The main range is one-and-a-half storeys in height, the eastern range is single-storey, and the western wing has two storeys. Most of the windows are small-paned casements, while the southern end of the western wing contains a sash window. The principal entrance is on the south side of the main range and is sheltered by a porch formed from large stone slabs. The front elevation has three ground-floor windows and three dormer windows above. The eastern range contains a doorway and former stable entrance, while the western wing has additional doors and windows on its inner elevation. Its long western side has an irregular arrangement of openings and is partly rendered and partly painted stone.

=== Interior ===
The interior retains a traditional layout centred on a stone-floored passage running from the main entrance to the rear servery, which contains barrels and shelving and retains a traditional arrangement that survives in only a small number of pubs. On one side of the passage is the tap room, which has stone flag floors, built-in wooden benches, exposed beams and a large fireplace. The room is separated from the passage by timber partitions and retains a notably simple character. On the other side is the former parlour, now known as the Big Room, which was enlarged in the mid-20th century by incorporating part of an adjoining stable block. This room contains wood panelling, exposed ceiling joists and a fireplace added during the enlargement. Differences in ceiling height reflect the incorporation of the former stable accommodation.

The rear service area is used as a cellar and servery, while part of the former stable range contains lavatories accessed from outside. The later rear extension has a modern interior. Additional rooms in the cross wing can be reached from both inside and outside the building and retain timber wall lining incorporating cupboards fitted with 19th-century hinges. In the garden outside, the benches and tables are made of stone.

== Woodhenge ==
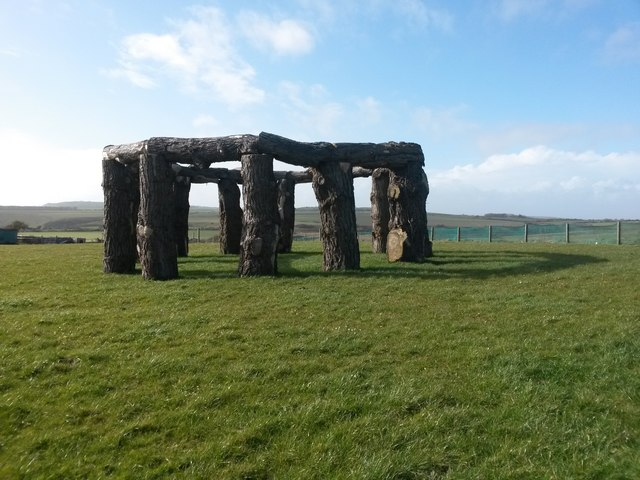
Woodhenge sculpture by landlord Charlie Newman in 2016

The landlord of the Square and Compass, Charlie Newman, built a tree-trunk sculpture known as Woodhenge in a field near the pub. The trunks had originally been intended for use as firewood, but were instead used to construct the sculpture, which was completed in time for the summer solstice in 2015. Built from two trees, one of which was 7.6 metres (25 ft) tall, Woodhenge was described by Newman as "a bit of fun". The structure was 10 metres (33 ft) wide and 3.5 metres (11 ft) in height, and weighed about 35 tonnes (34 long tons; 39 short tons).

Following a complaint, Purbeck District Council instructed Newman to dismantle the sculpture because it was located within the Area of Outstanding Natural Beauty and did not comply with planning regulations. After an online petition, the council decided that the structure could remain for two years. In August 2026, it was reported that Woodhenge had been destroyed by fire; the cause was not determined.

== Gallery ==
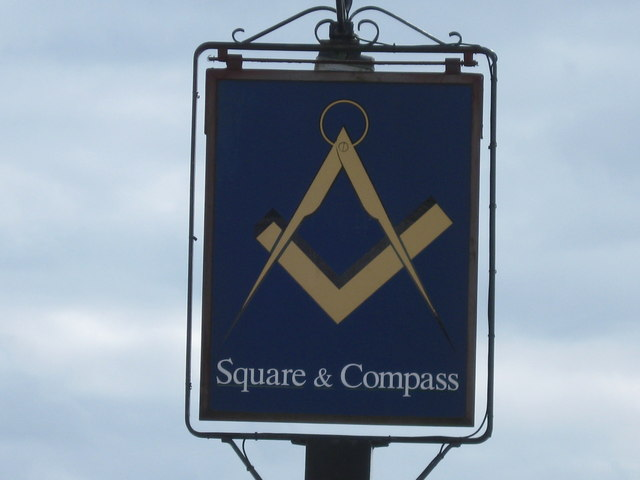
The pub sign

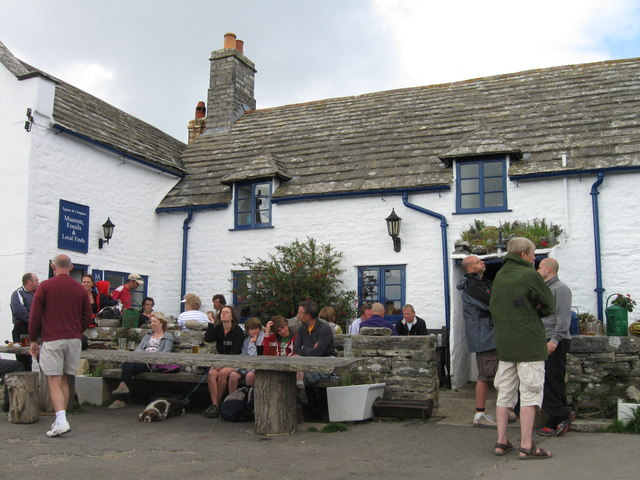
Visitors at the pub

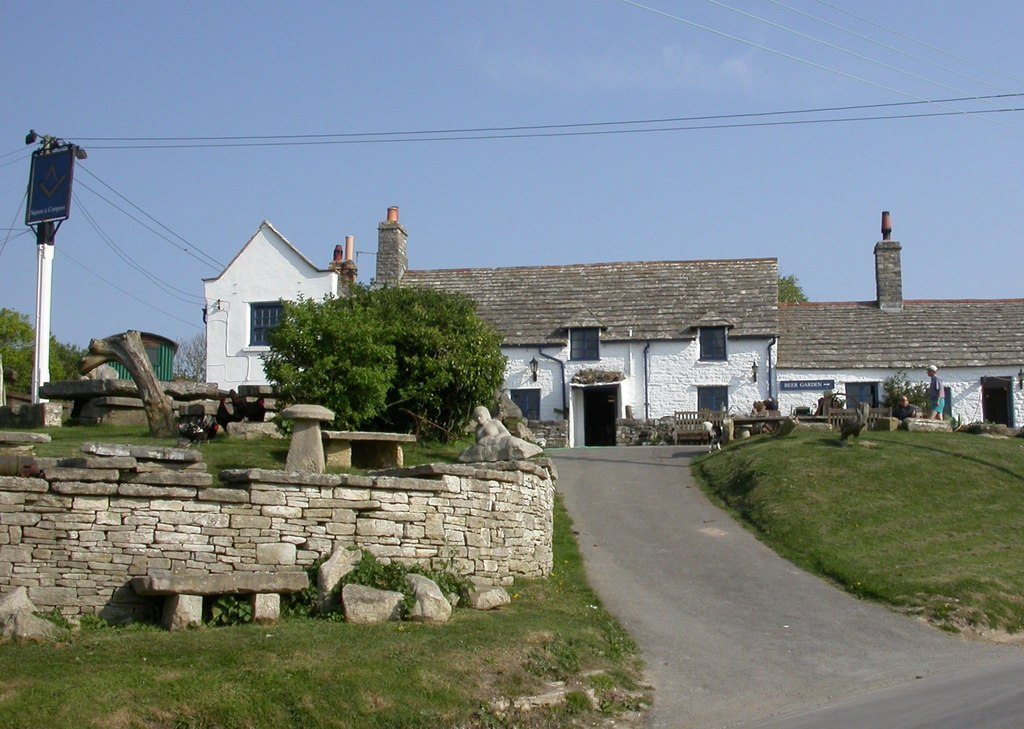
Pathway up to the pub

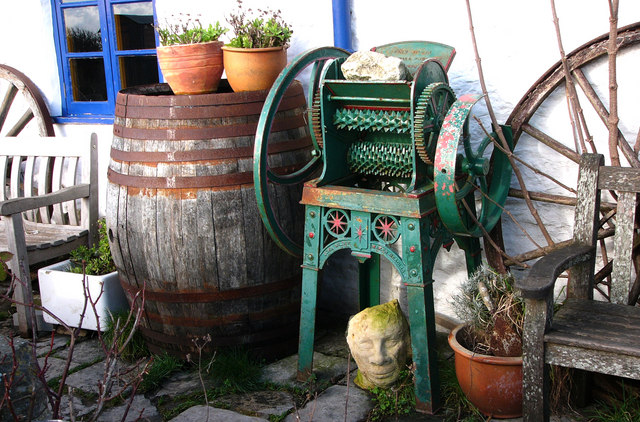
Items outside

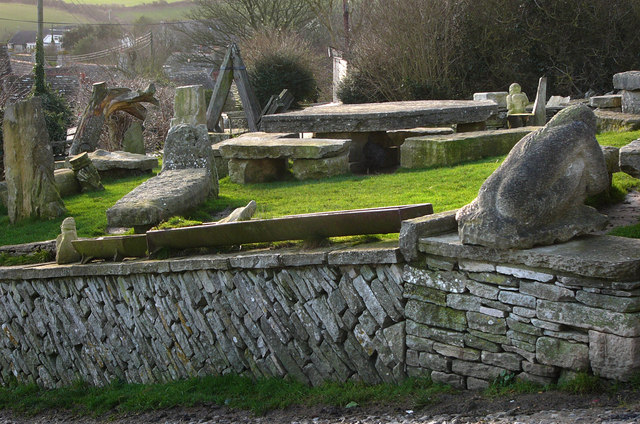
Garden including stone table

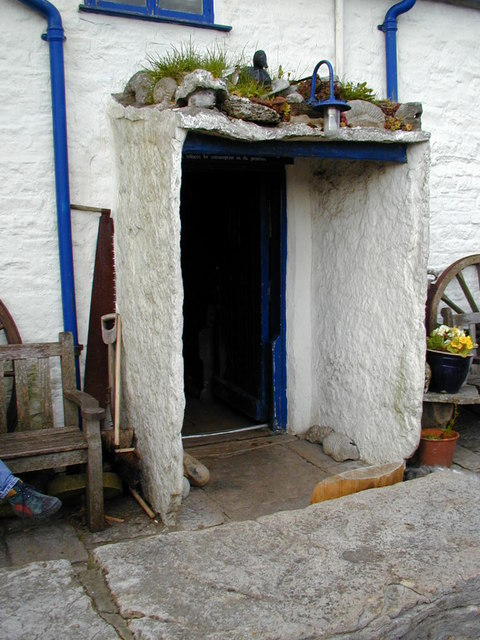
Historic porch and door

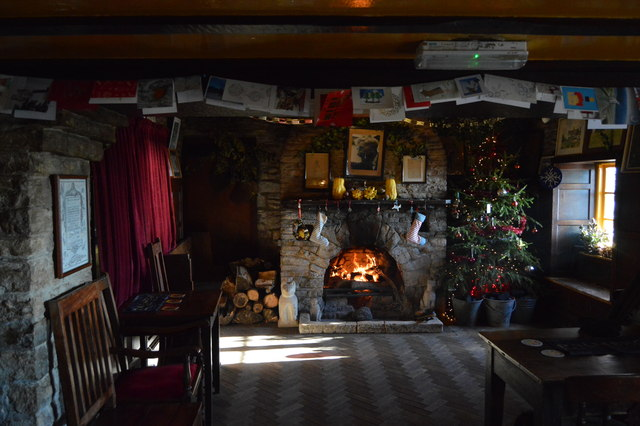
Woodburner inside

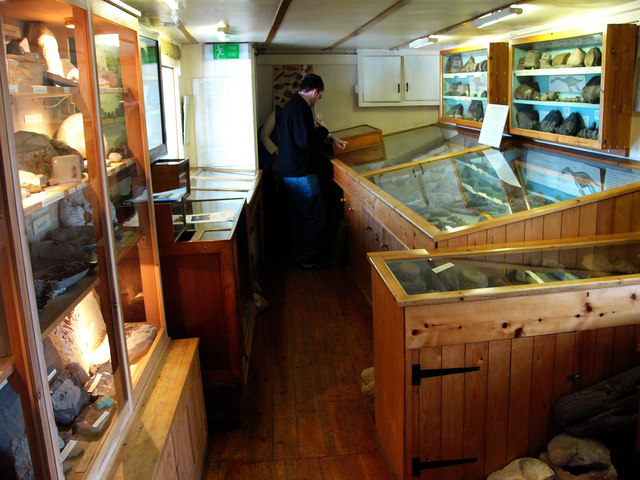
Fossil museum

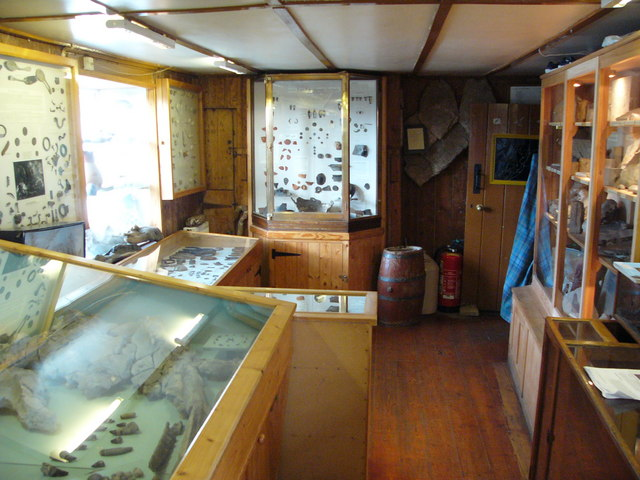
Fossil museum

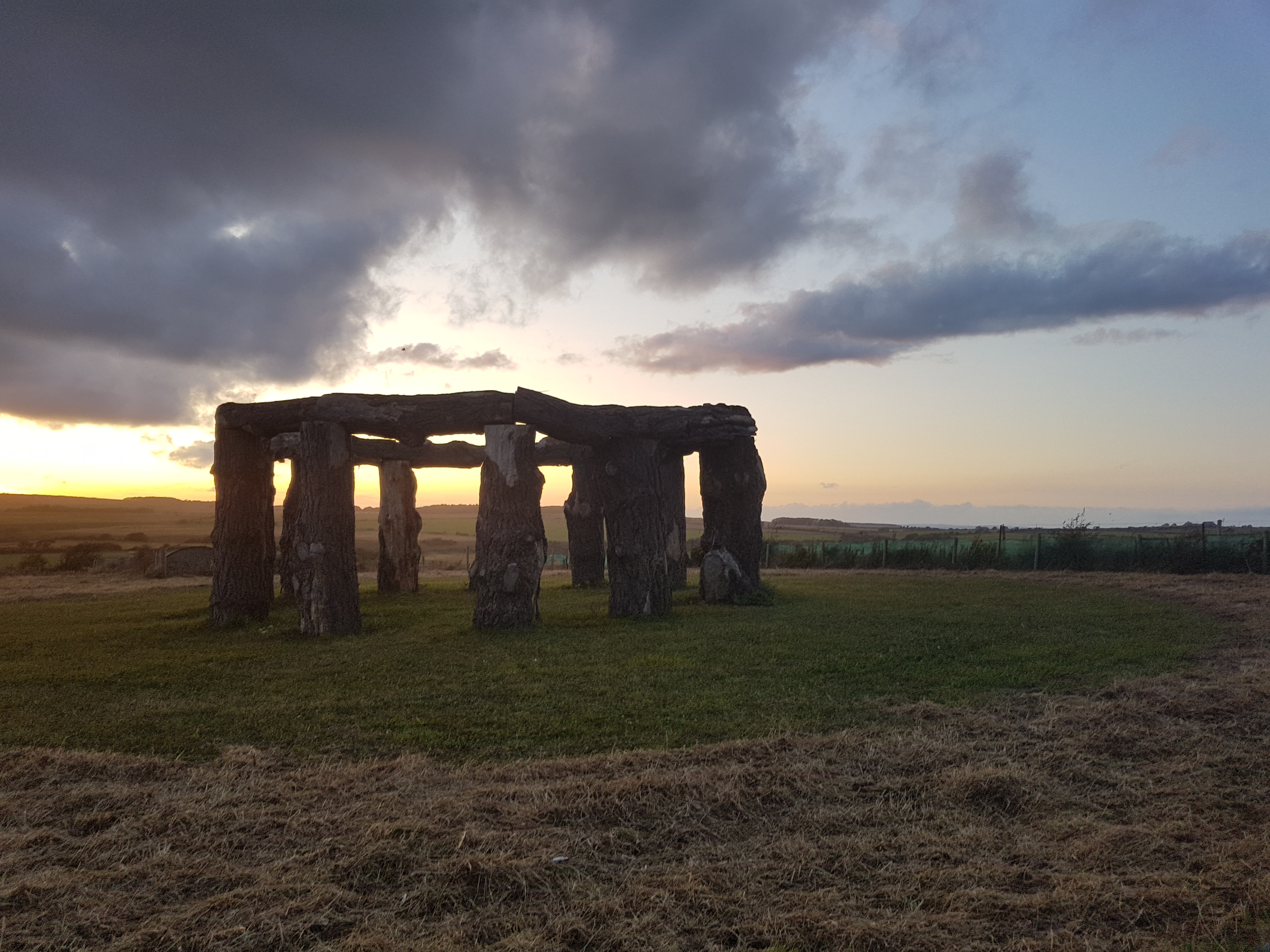
Woodhenge

== See also ==
- Grade II listed buildings in Dorset
