= Newell House School =

Historic building in Sherborne, Dorset, England

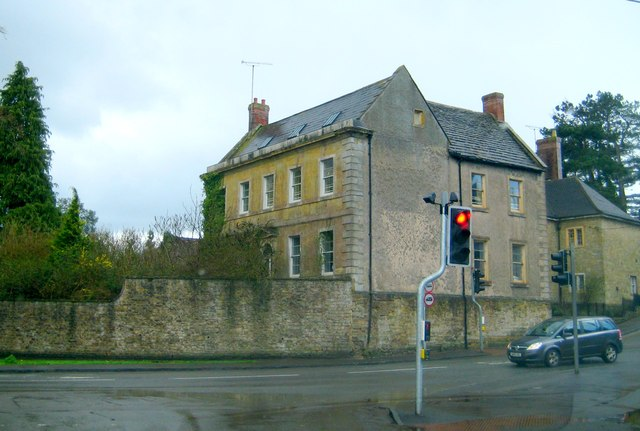
- The school in 2011

- Location within Dorset

General information
- Status: Derelict
- Type: School
- Location: Cornhill, Sherborne, Dorset, England
- Coordinates: 50.9501°N 2.5214°W
- Opened: 1625
- Destroyed: 2026

Listed Building – Grade II
- Official name: Newell House School including forecourt walls, railings and gates
- Designated: 28 November 1950
- Reference no.: 1110757

Listed Building – Grade II
- Official name: Barn to Newell House School
- Designated: 28 November 1950
- Reference no.: 1304878

Newell House School was a school on Cornhill in Sherborne, a market town in Dorset, England. Parts of the building date from 1625, and it closed in 2000 before falling into disrepair and becoming a target for vandalism. In April 2026, a major fire destroyed its roof, prompting renewed calls for action over the deteriorating Grade II listed site.

== History ==
The east side of the building dates from 1625, with other sections originating from the 17th and 19th centuries. Both the main building and the neighbouring barn are Grade II listed. The school closed in 2000, and the privately owned property subsequently fell into disrepair, becoming a target for vandalism and anti-social behaviour. By May 2023, the site was heavily overgrown with vegetation. In September 2025, a councillor on Dorset Council described the building as a "high arson risk".

On 26 April 2026, a fire destroyed the school's roof. The Campaign for the Protection of Rural England criticised local authorities, saying they "could and should" have done more to safeguard a historic building that had become a "magnet for persistent anti-social behaviour". Sherborne Town Council later asked Dorset Council to consider compulsory purchase of the property. On 7 May 2026, it was reported that the main chimney and other damaged parts of the roof would be removed, and on 13 May 2026, surrounding roads were reopened following structural work.

== See also ==
- Grade II listed buildings in Dorset
- List of schools in Dorset
