= Tout (surname) =

Tout is a surname. Notable people with the surname include:

- Ernie Tout (1874–1966), Australian rules footballer
- Frederick Tout (1873–1950), Australian solicitor, pastoralist, businessman, and politician
- Mark Tout (born 1961), English bobsledder
- Thomas Frederick Tout (1855–1929), English historian
