= Portland Cenotaph =

War memorial in Portland, Dorset, England

Coordinates: 50.5560°N 2.4414°W

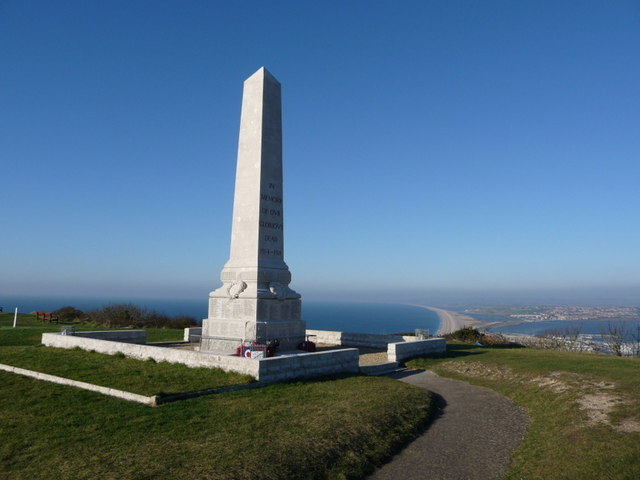
Portland's War Memorial

The Portland Cenotaph is a war memorial located on the Isle of Portland, Dorset, England. It is situated at New Ground, looking down to Underhill of the island and overlooking Chesil Beach, as it stands in front of Portland Heights Hotel. The monument is dedicated to the local service personnel who died during both the First and Second World Wars. It has been a Grade II Listed Monument since May 1993.

== History ==
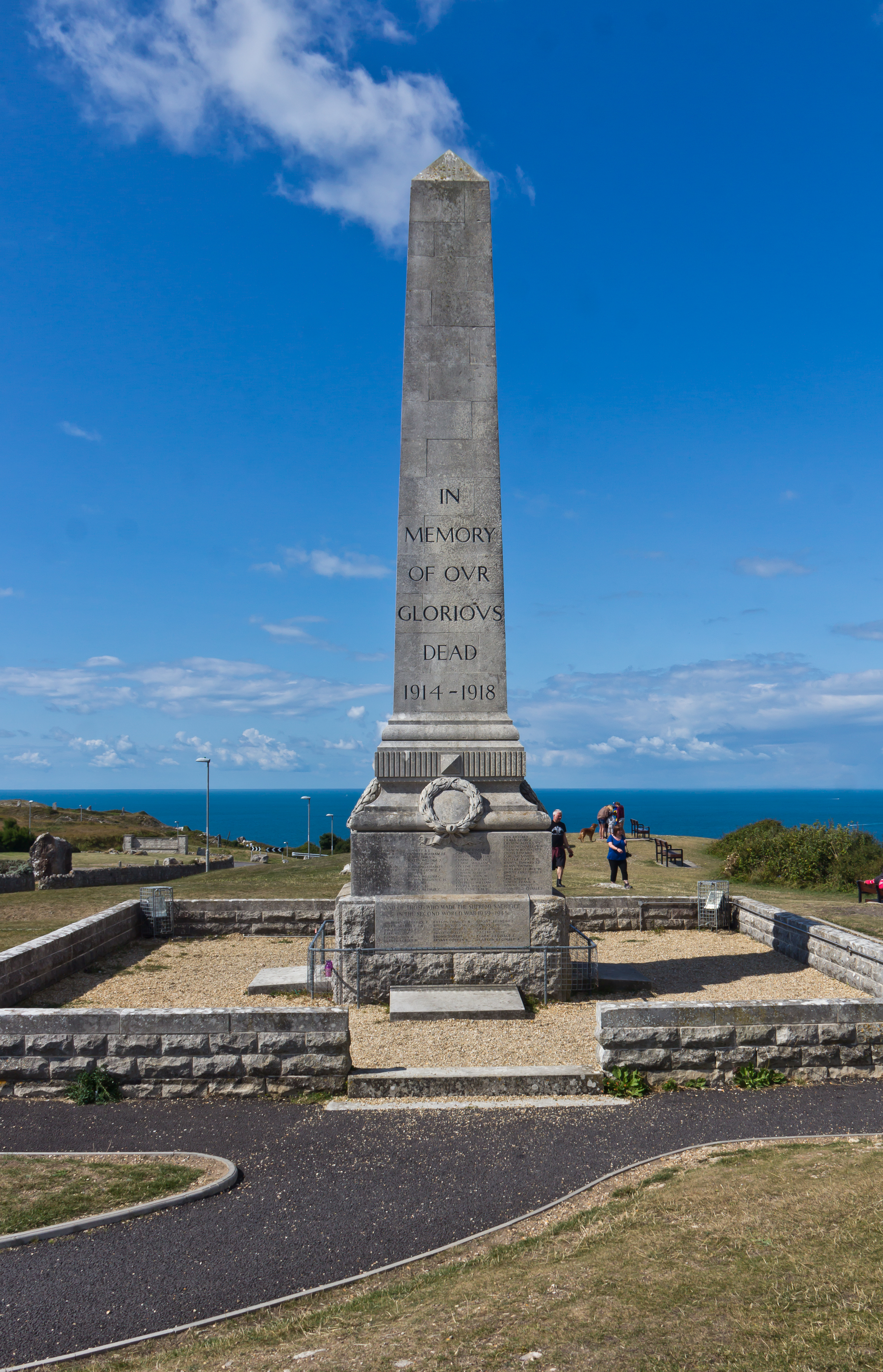
The War Memorial

Portland sent upwards of 1000 men to fight during the Great War. In the years following World War I, the local people of Portland expressed their desire to retain the memory of those who made the supreme sacrifice. However, the communities of Underhill and Tophill continually argued that there should be two separate war memorials to honour the dead. In the end, a compromise was reached by placing the memorial where it could be seen by both communities at New Ground.

It was unveiled on 11 November 1926 by ex-Private Crispin – a local ex-soldier who had lost three brothers in the war. The featured title reads "In memory of our glorious dead 1914–1918". After World War II, those who died in the war were recorded underneath those from World War I, with the title "And of those who made the supreme sacrifice in the Second World War 1939–1945". The memorial records 237 Portland service personnel who had died in World War I and lists 108 who died in World War II.

The memorial is the place of gathering each year for Remembrance Day, and in 2012, local newspaper Dorset Echo reported that more than 400 people gathered at the war memorial for the Portland Royal British Legion service – one of the biggest crowds ever to attend.

== HMS Sidon Memorial and Olympic Rings ==
Nearby to the memorial is another smaller memorial which was erected in 2005 for the men who died in the explosion of a faulty torpedo on board the submarine HMS Sidon (P259) whilst docked alongside Portland Harbour in 1955. In 2012, a sculpture of the Olympic rings, carved to celebrate the summer's sailing events at Weymouth and Portland, was placed close to the memorials. It had been in Weymouth during the games, greeting passengers at the town's railway station.
