= Underhill, Dorset =

Coordinates: 50.56087°N 2.44404°W

Underhill shown within Dorset at grid reference SY692723

Underhill is the name given to the area of very steep land, at the northern end of the Isle of Portland in Dorset, England, which contains the villages of Chiswell, Castletown and Fortuneswell. The remaining part of the island is known as Tophill. The geology of Underhill is different from Tophill; Underhill lies on a steep escarpment composed of Portland Sand, lying above a thicker layer of Kimmeridge Clay, which extends to Chesil Beach and Portland Harbour. This Kimmeridge Clay has resulted in a series of landslides, forming West Weares and East Weares.
