= Portwey Hospital =

Former workhouse and hospital in Weymouth, Dorset, England

Coordinates: 50.60501°N 2.46126°W

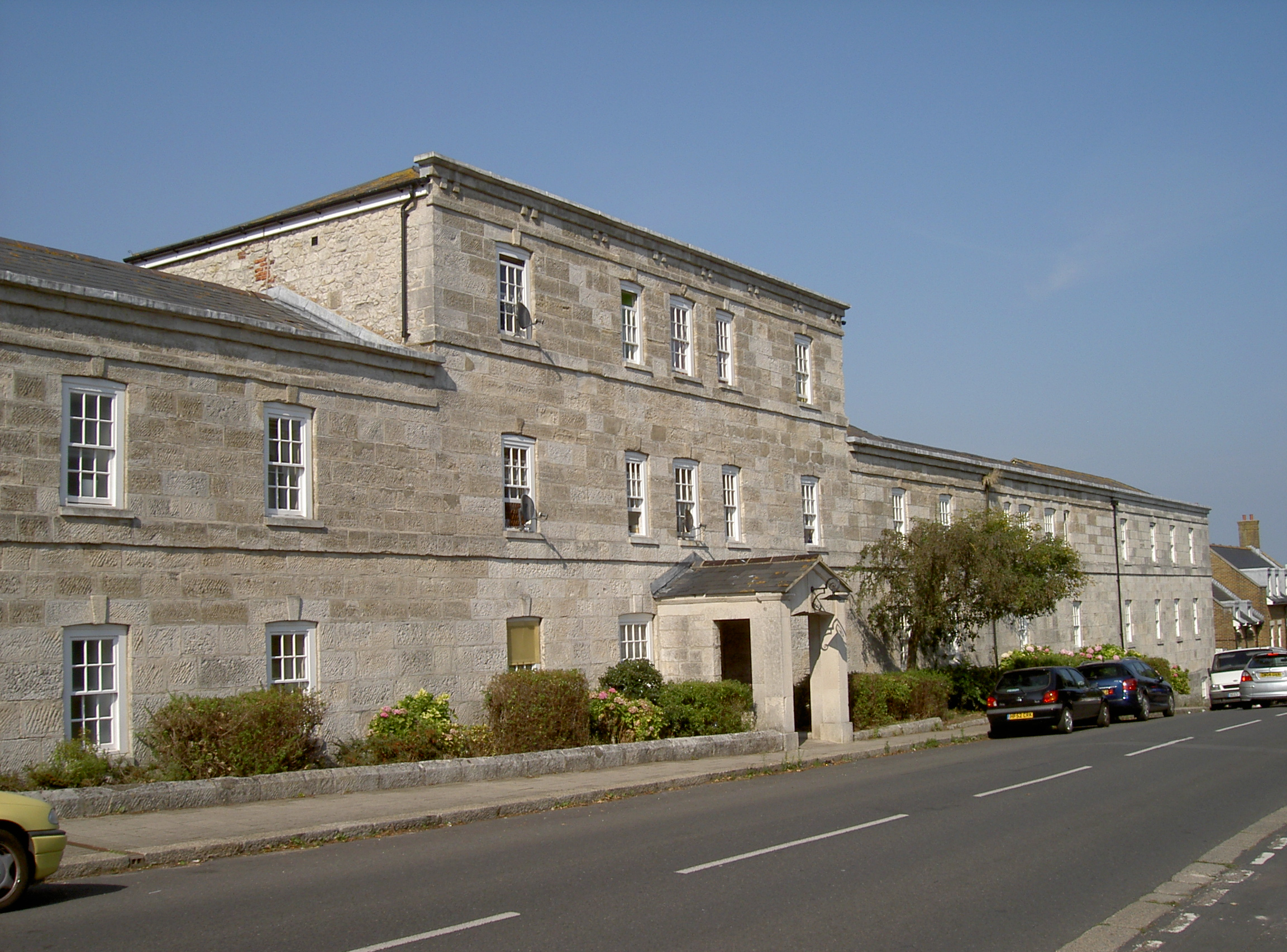
The former workhouse and hospital seen in 2014, now Union Court.

Portwey Hospital is a former workhouse and hospital located in Weymouth, Dorset, England. Originally built in the 1830s as the Weymouth Union workhouse, it later became Portwey Hospital in the 1930s. After closing in 1987, the building was transformed during the 1990s into the housing development known as Union Court.

Built of Portland stone, the former hospital became a Grade II listed building in 1974. Historic England, in its survey of the building, described it as "somewhat austere, but retains externally much of the early fabric and detail". They added: "to the street it has a simple dignity, enhanced by the economical use of Portland stone".

== History ==
Following the establishment of the Weymouth Poor Law Union in January 1836, work began that year on the construction of a workhouse at Wyke Road. The building was designed using standard plans by Sampson Kempthorne of the Poor Law Commissioners, which saw modifications made by Thomas Dobson and Thomas Hill Harvey of the Weymouth Board of Guardians. Known as the Union Workhouse and later the Poor Law Institution, the building was transformed into Portwey Hospital in 1939.

The hospital closed in 1987. In 1989, planning permission was granted to Ryan of Wimborne Ltd to transform the building into forty-three flats and five houses, while adding additional housing on adjacent land. However, the plans stalled and the building's development was taken over by the Warden Housing Association. Plans for fifty-five dwellings to be created were approved in 1992, and the work on the new Union Court was completed in 1993. The development was awarded the Weymouth Civic Society Award in 1994.
