= Royal Hotel, Weymouth =

Hotel in Weymouth, Dorset, England

Coordinates: 50.61364°N 2.45344°W

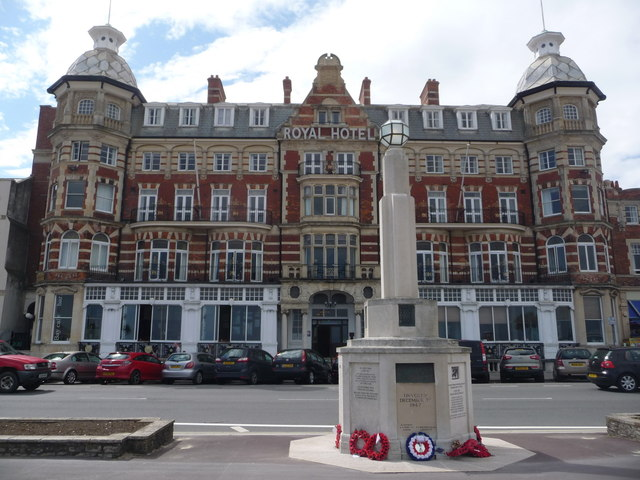
The Royal Hotel with the U.S. Forces World War II Memorial in the foreground.

Royal Hotel is a 19th-century hotel at Weymouth, Dorset, England. It is located on the town's seafront, overlooking Weymouth Beach and Weymouth Bay. The building has been a Grade II listed building since 1974.

Replacing an earlier hotel of the same name, the Royal Hotel opened in 1899. Historic England describe it as a "forceful building, in the manner of Richard Norman Shaw's more monumental work in this style and demonstrating a characteristic late Victorian approach to urban development".

== History ==
Weymouth developed as a popular seaside resort at the end of the 18th-century, which was greatly boosted by King George III's numerous visits to the town. Sea bathing was established at Weymouth by the 1770s, prior to the King's first visit in 1789. During this period, complaints were made about the town's lack of "desirable" accommodation. In response, Stacie's Hotel was built by builder Andrew Sproule for its proprietor Mr. Stacie and opened in 1773.

Stacie's Hotel was one of the first purpose-built establishments to capitalise on Weymouth's early development as a resort. It was built with its own assembly room, which proved popular enough to replace the town's original at Trinity Street. It was soon renamed the Royal Hotel, after being patronised by King George III. In 1805, a grand dinner was held at the hotel to celebrate the birthday of Princess Amelia. Although the royal family dined at their nearby holiday home Gloucester Lodge, they received guests at the hotel and later rejoined them at the evening ball.

The original hotel was demolished in 1891, with plans for a replacement being drawn up by Charles Orlando Law. Construction began with the laying of the foundation stone in 1897 by the mayor of Weymouth, Charles Jesty. Built of red brick, with Portland stone dressings, the hotel was completed in 1899 and opened on 16 May that year. Along with a carriage house, a ballroom known as Queen's Ballroom was built to the rear of the building.

During World War II, the hotel was requisitioned for use as the local headquarters of the United States military. Both Weymouth and Portland were major embarkation points for Allied troops involved in the Normandy landings. Requisitioned in 1943, the hotel reopened on 26 November 1945. The hotel, which formerly operated as part of the Bay Hotels chain, was taken over by Bespoke Hotels in 2020. Leisureplex Hotel Group then bought the Royal Hotel on 20 December 2023.
