= St Peter's Primary School, Poole =

St Peter's Primary School
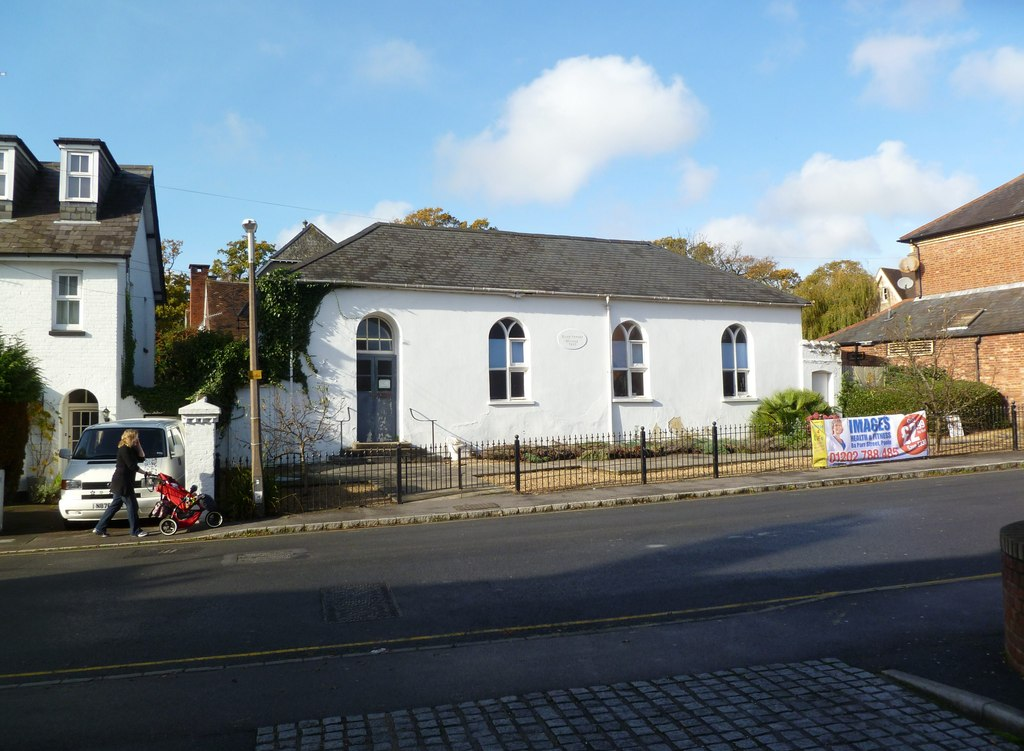

Location
- Parr Street; Poole, Dorset; England
- Coordinates: 50°43′25.88″N 1°57′13.24″W

Information
- Established: 1833
- Closed: 20th century
- Local authority: Bournemouth, Christchurch and Poole

St Peter's Primary School is a former school building in Poole, England. It has been a Grade II listed building since 1980. It is located near St Peter's Church, Parkstone.

== History ==
The primary school dates from 1833 and is of a Gothic style. Historic England describe the building as an "unusual example of a school building with cob walls".

== See also ==
- List of schools in Bournemouth, Christchurch and Poole
