= Portland House, Weymouth =

Historic house in Weymouth, Dorset, UK

Portland House
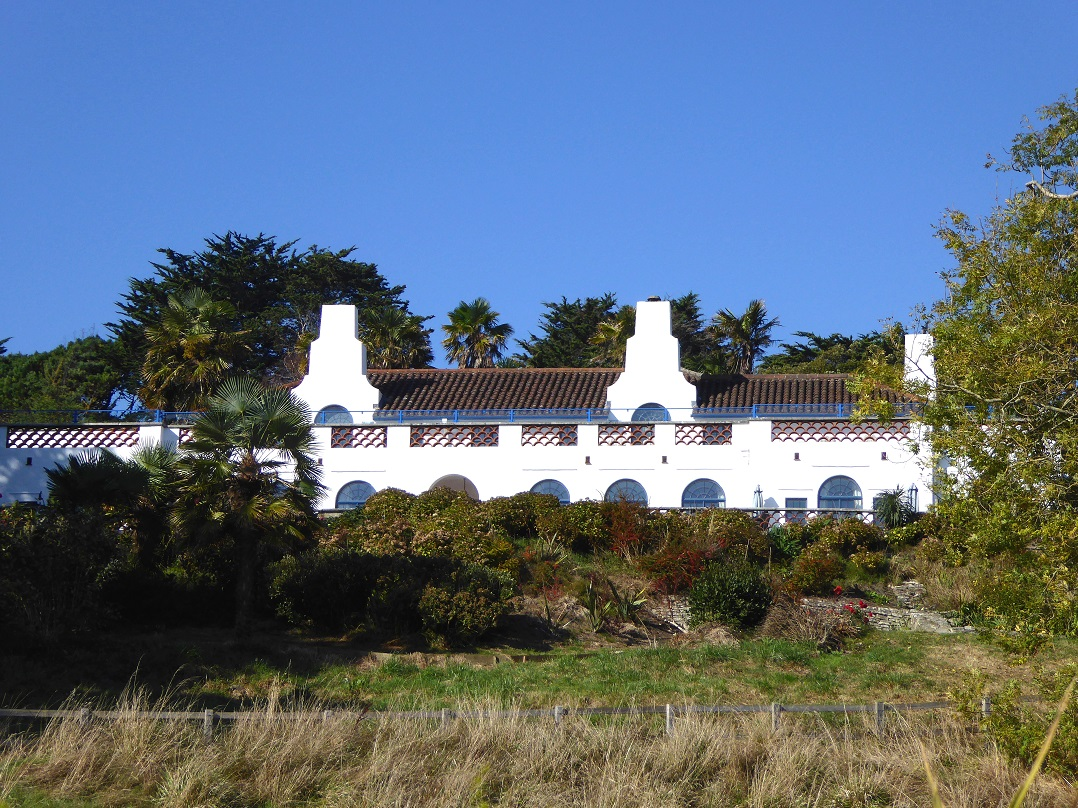
- Portland House from the south

- Location within Dorset
- 50.6005°N 2.4535°W
- Location: Weymouth, Dorset, England

History
- Built: 1935

Site notes
- Architect(s): Lord Gerald Wellesley; Trenwith Wills
- Owner: National Trust

Listed Building – Grade II
- Official name: Portland House
- Designated: 24 October 2001
- Reference no.: 1389662

Portland House is a 20th-century detached house, located at Weymouth, Dorset, England. It is found in the area known as Bincleaves, overlooking Portland Harbour. The house, built in 1935, is now in the care of the National Trust, which lets the building as a holiday cottage.

Portland House became a Grade II listed building in 2001. It is one of the "very few remaining examples" of a house with a Hollywood Spanish design. Historic England have described the house as a "complete and well designed example of a 1930s Mediterranean villa style house".

== History ==
Portland House was built in 1935 as a holiday home for Geoffrey Henry Bushby by Turner and Payne of London. It was designed by the architects Lord Gerald Wellesley and Trenwith Wills. However, its intended use as a seaside retreat was never realised as Bushby died in December that year after a short illness. Having inherited the house, Bushby's mother and sister had at first intended to sell it, but ended up living there for many years as they became "so fond" of it.

During World War II, the house was damaged in an air raid on 11 August 1940. At the time, HM Naval Base Portland was a major target for the Luftwaffe.

Dorothy Bushby decided to donate the house to the National Trust in 1970, though she remained there until her death 13 years later.

In 2011, Portland House underwent renovation by the National Trust. By this time the building was in need of repair and some modernisation such as re-plumbing and re-wiring. The £480,000 project took five months to complete and included re-furnishing. The original 18th-century furnishings were transferred to Mompesson House in Salisbury. It was then made available as a holiday let, while public open days are held twice annually.
