= Tophill =

Coordinates: 50.5496°N 2.4361°W

Tophill shown within Dorset at grid reference SY692723

Tophill is a gently sloping area of land on the Isle of Portland in Dorset, England, rising from sea level at Portland Bill to 151 metres (495 ft) near HMP The Verne at its northern end. On Tophill are five of the settlements on the island: Easton, Weston, Southwell, the Grove and Wakeham. Portland stone lies under Tophill, and the strata decline at a shallow angle of around 1.5 degrees from their peak down to sea level. The lower northern end of the island is called Underhill.

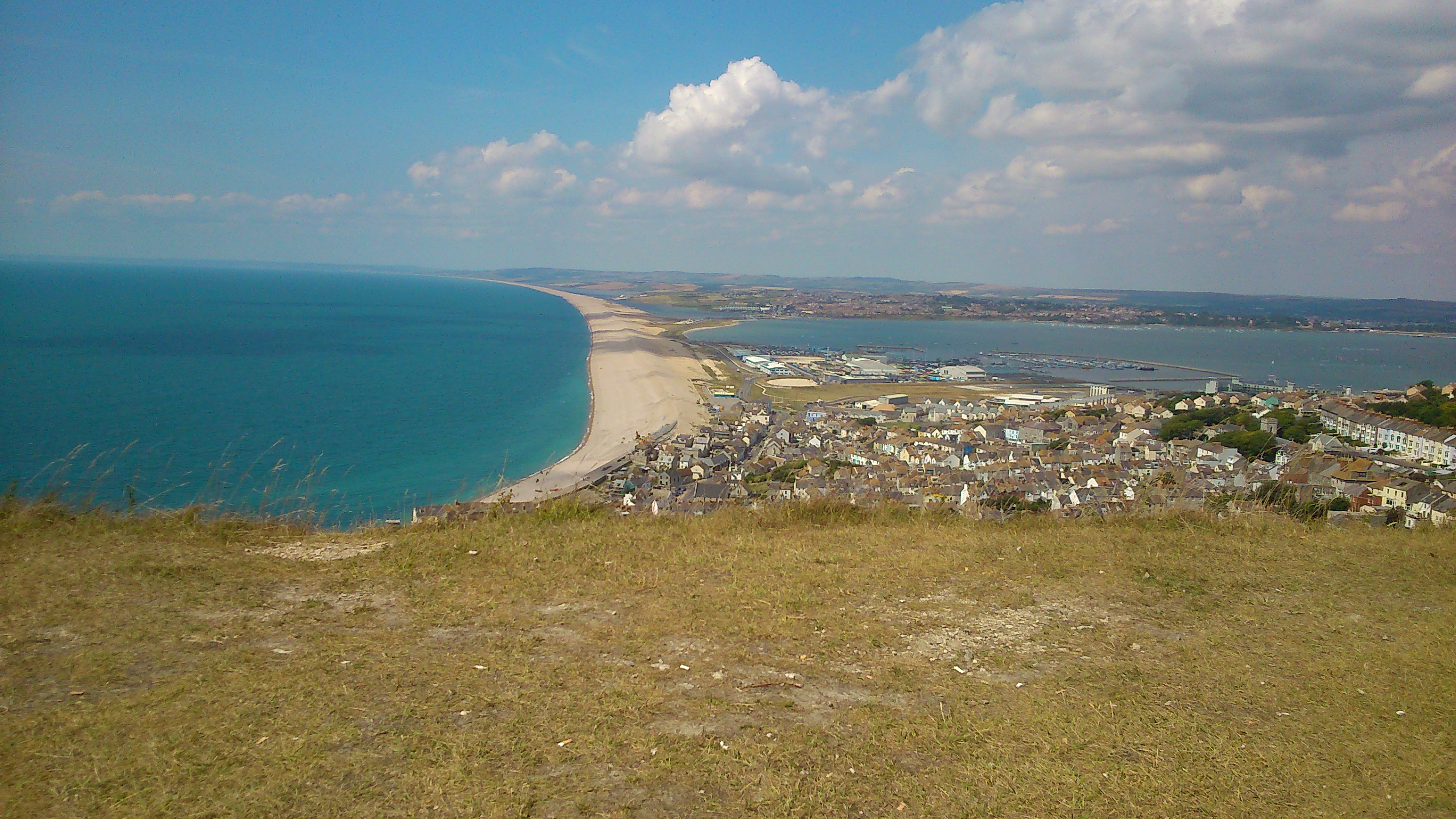
A view of Chesil Beach from New Ground, showing much of Underhill

In the north-west corner of Tophill is Tout Quarry, whilst the nature reserve King Barrow Quarry lies at the north-east. Near the northernmost point lies the area known as New Ground used as a lookout point, in front of which sits the Portland Cenotaph.
