= Ernie Tout =

Australian rules footballer (1874–1966)

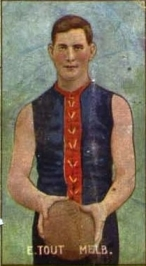

Personal information
- Full name: Francis Ernest Mainwaring Tout
- Born: 11 August 1874; Collingwood, Victoria
- Died: 15 June 1966 (aged 91); Mount Evelyn, Victoria

Playing career^{1}
Years	Club	Games (Goals)
1903–04	Melbourne	19 (3)
- ^{1} Playing statistics correct to the end of 1904.

Ernie Tout (11 August 1874 – 15 June 1966) was an Australian rules footballer who played with Melbourne in the Victorian Football League (VFL).
