= Merchant's Railway =

Former railway in Dorset, England

Coordinates: 50°33′55″N 2°26′34″W

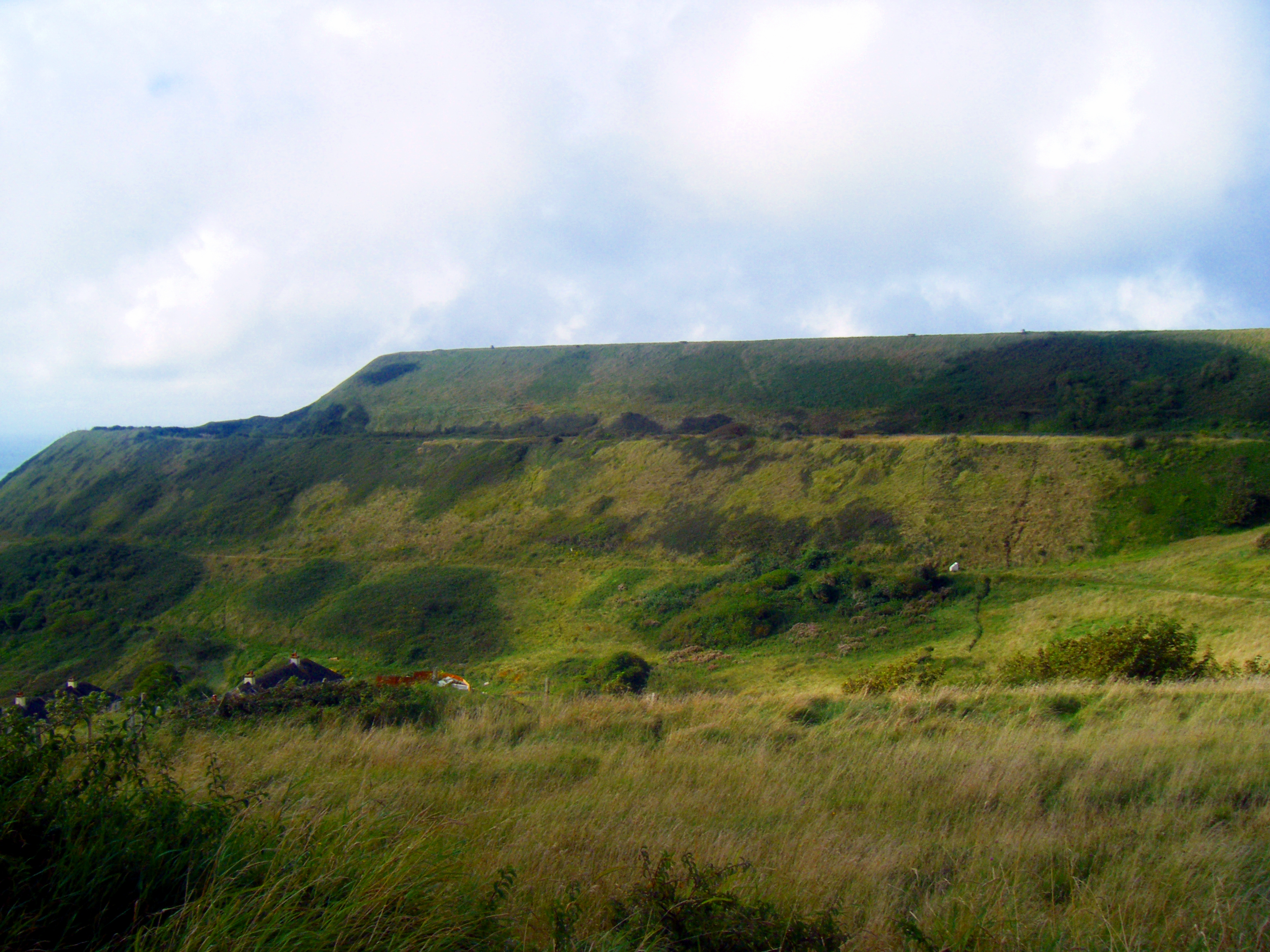
Verne Hill, showing two levels where the Merchant's Railway transported stone along to Castletown

Merchant's Railway was a horse drawn and cable operated incline railway on the Isle of Portland, Dorset, England, built for the stone trade on the island. It was the earliest railway in Dorset, opening in 1826. The railway ran two miles from many working quarries at the north of Tophill, along the edge of Verne Hill, to a pier at Castletown, from where the Portland stone was shipped. It was in operation from 1826 to 1939. Since becoming disused the original path of the railway has become a popular public footpath.

== History ==
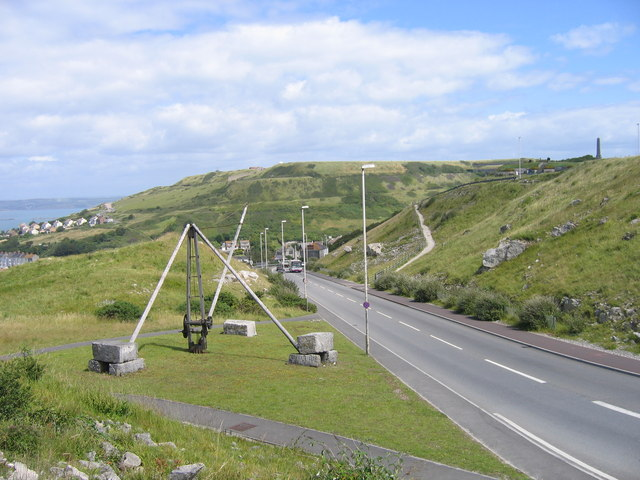
Priory Corner was the location where stone was transported so it could be transferred onto the Merchant's Railway.

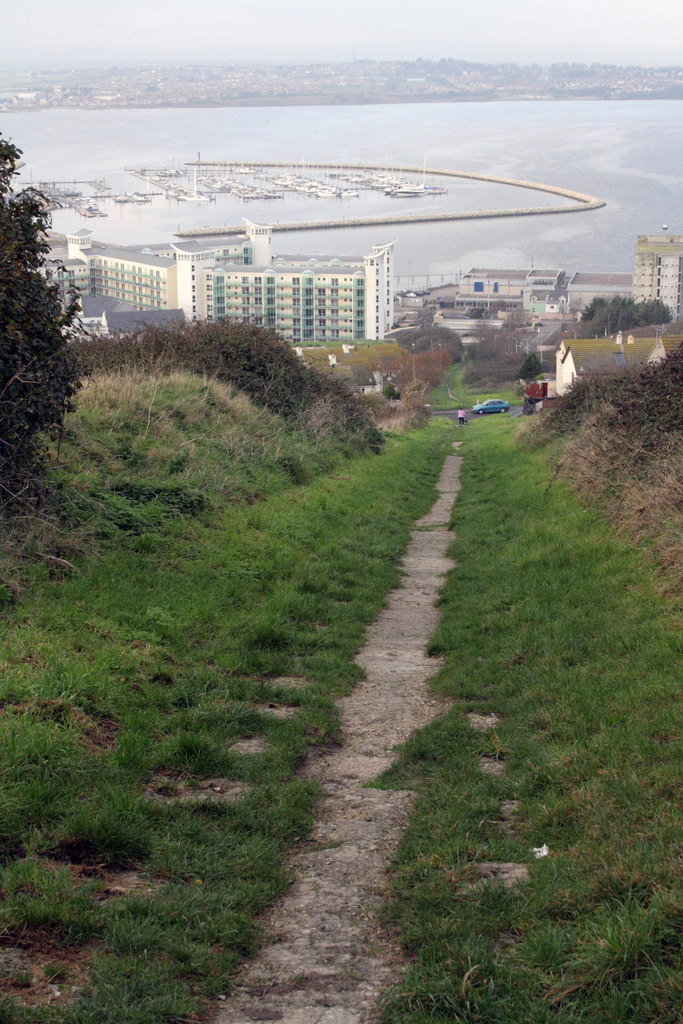
The remaining Freeman's Incline section of the railway, leading from the Verne down to Castletown

The Merchant's Railway was created to transfer stone from the Tophill quarries to Castletown's waterfront. This was originally done using horses, but the method was deemed cruel. After gaining an Act of Parliament in 1825, the railway track was constructed and opened in 1826. it used the unusual gauge of 4 ft 6 in (1,372 mm).

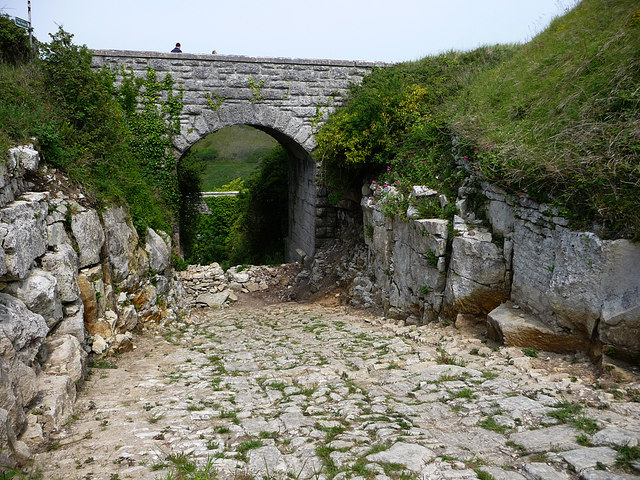
A Yeates Incline bridge, with the remaining track bed of the railway

The route of the railway led from Priory Corner, around Verne Hill to the Freeman's Incline. From this point the stone would be sent downwards to the Castletown to be shipped. In 1866, due to increasing demand, a second, upper track was cut into Verne Hill. Yeates Incline was built as an addition to the main line to serve Withies Croft, Independent, and Inmosthay Quarries. For this incline four bridges were constructed, all of which are now Grade II Listed.

The traffic on the railway began to decline with the introduction of traction engines and motor vehicles. During World War I, the stone industry temporarily ceased. The Merchant's Railway was closed in 1939. It has been calculated that during the railway's use, approximately 704.93672 tons of stone travelled down the incline.

The route of the railway in now a public footpath and has become a popular walk. The route was included in the BBC TV series Railway Walks presented by Julia Bradbury, where it was used as a continuation of the Rodwell Trail. The walk was included in the book accompanying the series and a picture of Bradbury standing on the incline was used for the cover.
