= Mulberry Harbour Phoenix Units, Portland =

Coordinates: 50.5709°N 2.4428°W

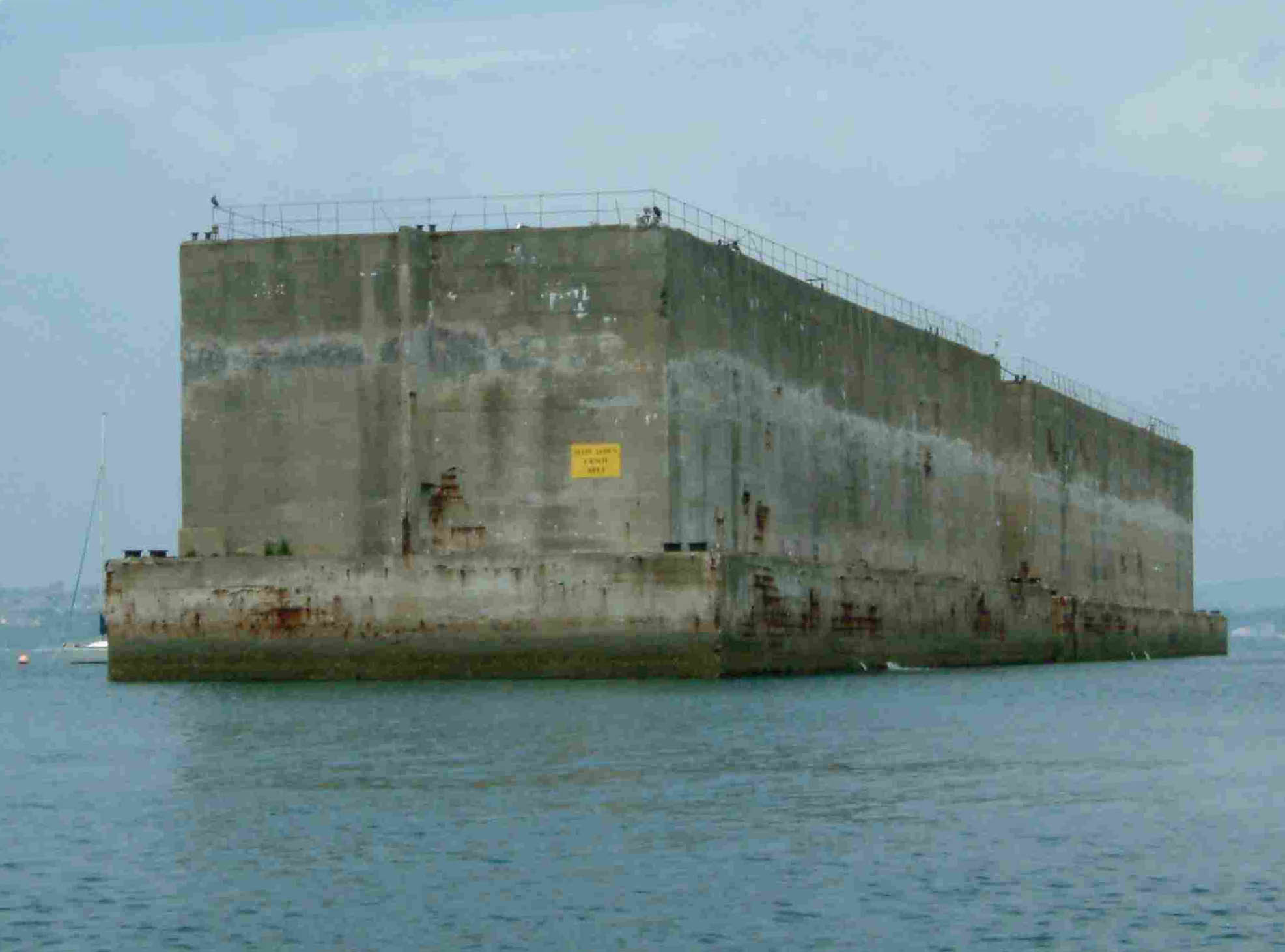
The pair of Phoenixes at Portland Harbour.

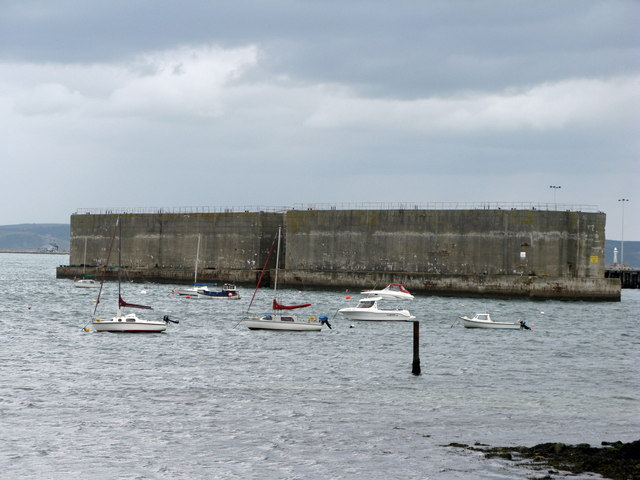
Both units today provide useful shelter to boats.

The Portland Mulberry Harbour Phoenix Units are two reinforced concrete caissons, built as part of the artificial Mulberry harbours that were assembled as part of the follow-up to the Normandy landings during World War II. Out of a total of 213 (212 floated) produced units, two units still remain at the Isle of Portland, in Dorset, southern England. They are located at Portland Harbour, close to Queen's Pier. The two units became Grade II Listed in 1993.

== History ==
When planning the invasion of France the allies knew they needed to supply the troops who were ashore. The only reliable method of landing resources was through a major port. As the German army held all of France's harbours, the solution was the Mulberry harbours. A building program followed, creating two operational harbours within two weeks. The Mulberry harbours were considered a success in their supporting role of Allied troops.

Following the war, ten units were towed to Portland Harbour. Eight of these were later sent to the Netherlands to block breaches in the dykes after the great storm of 31 January 1953. The two units left behind are now used as a wind break, helping ships berth at Queen's Pier. In 2017, six statues were installed on the tops of the units, representing two British Sailors, two American GIs and two Dock workers.
