= Dinosaur Museum =

Dinosaur Museum may refer to:

- Aathal Dinosaur Museum, Aathal-Seegräben, Switzerland
- Dakota Dinosaur Museum, Dickinson, North Dakota
- Dinosaur Discovery Museum, Kenosha, Wisconsin, United States
- Dinosaur Museum (Dorchester), Dorset, United Kingdom
- Dinosaur Walk Museum, Pigeon Forge, Tennessee and Branson, Missouri, United States
- Dinosaur World (theme parks), United States
- Dinosauria (museum)
- Dinosaurland Fossil Museum
- Fukui Prefectural Dinosaur Museum
- Goseong Dinosaur Museum
- Lufeng Dinosaur Museum
- Makoshika Dinosaur Museum, Glendive, Montana, United States
- Museum of Dinosaurs and Ancient Cultures, Cocoa Beach, Florida, United States
- Nalut Dinosaur Museum
- National Dinosaur Museum
- Phu Wiang Dinosaur Museum
- Wyoming Dinosaur Center, Thermopolis, Wyoming, United States
