= List of museums in Dorset =

This list of museums in Dorset, England contains museums which are defined for this context as institutions (including nonprofit organizations, government entities, and private businesses) that collect and care for objects of cultural, artistic, scientific, or historical interest and make their collections or related exhibits available for public viewing. Also included are non-profit art galleries and university art galleries. Museums that exist only in cyberspace (i.e., virtual museums) are not included.

Name	Image	Town/City	Type	Summary
Anvil Point Lighthouse		Swanage	Maritime	Lighthouse open for tours, located within Durlston Country Park
Athelhampton		Dorchester	Historic house	15th-century manor house and gardens
Beaminster Museum		Beaminster	Local	local history, archaeology, agriculture
Bennetts Water Gardens		Chickerell	Multiple	8-acre (32,000 m^{2}) garden, collection of water lilies, local history museum
Blandford Fashion Museum		Blandford	Fashion	costumes and accessories from the 1730s to the 1970s
Blandford Town Museum		Blandford	Local	local history, trades, archaeology, military, railway
Bridport Museum		Bridport	Local	local history, textiles, fossils, art
Bournemouth Aviation Museum		Hurn	Aviation	Airplanes, engines, cockpits, a double-decker bus
Bournemouth Natural Science Society		Bournemouth	Natural history	A natural history museum housing exhibits and specimens from Archaeology, Astronomy, Botany, Conchology, Egyptology, Entomology, Geology, Marine Science, Microscopy, Oology, Ornithology, Science, and Zoology. Our displays include preserved plants, birds, mammals, reptiles, butterflies, moths and other insects, bird eggs, shells, fossils, rocks and minerals, archaeological artifacts and an Egyptology collection. Open to the public most Tuesdays of the year, and around school holidays.
Bournemouth University Atrium Gallery		Bournemouth	Art	works by both university students and contributing artists
Castletown D-Day Centre		Isle of Portland	Military	History of Portland Harbour's role in the Normandy landings
Charmouth Heritage Coast Centre		Charmouth	Natural history	Fossils and rocks of the Jurassic Coast
Chettle House		Chettle	Historic house	information, 18th century Queen Anne house and gardens
Clouds Hill		Wareham	Historic house	Operated by the National Trust, former home of T. E. Lawrence ("Lawrence of Arabia")
Corfe Castle Town Museum		Corfe Castle	Local	local history, geology, marble industry
Dinosaur Museum		Dorchester	Natural history	Dinosaurs, full size models, fossils of the Jurassic Coast
Dinosaurland Fossil Museum		Lyme Regis	Natural history	Local Jurassic marine fossils, dinosaurs, geology of the Jurassic Coast, shells, evolution
Dorset Museum		Dorchester	Multiple	Local history, natural history, art, archaeology, agriculture, author Thomas Hardy, fossil and dinosaurs
Dorset Teddy Bear Museum		Dorchester	Toy	Teddy bears
The Etches Collection		Kimmeridge	Natural history	Fossils
Fiddleford Manor		Sturminster Newton	Historic house	Operated by English Heritage, medieval small stone manor house
Forde Abbey		Chard	Historic house	Former Cistercian monastery, house and gardens
TheGallery at Arts University Bournemouth		Bournemouth	Art	contemporary art gallery
Gillingham Museum		Gillingham	Local	local history, trades, geology, industry
Gold Hill Museum		Shaftesbury	Local	local history, culture, industry
Grove Prison Museum		Isle of Portland	Prison	History of HM Prison Portland
Highcliffe Castle		Highcliffe	Historic house	19th century Romantic and Picturesque style castle, grounds laid out by Capability Brown
Keep Military Museum		Dorchester	Military	History of the regiments of Dorset and Devon
Kingston Lacy		Wimborne Minster	Historic house	Operated by the National Trust, 17th-century house with fine art, Egyptian artifacts, lavish interiors, gardens
Langton Matravers Museum		Langton Matravers	Local	local history, geology, limestone industry
Lulworth Castle		East Lulworth	Historic house	17th century mock castle manor house
Lyme Regis Marine Aquarium		Lyme Regis	Natural history	local fish and marine life of the Jurassic coast, history of The Cobb harbour wall
Lyme Regis Museum		Lyme Regis	Multiple	Fossils, geology, Jane Austen, local history, maritime heritage, writers and artists, formerly known as the Philpot Museum
Mangerton Mill		Bridport	Mill	information, 3 story watermill
Mapperton House		Beaminster	Historic house	Elizabethan manor house and gardens
Max Gate		Dorchester	Historic house	Operated by the National Trust, home of author Thomas Hardy
Museum of Design in Plastics		Bournemouth	Art	collection of the library of the Arts University Bournemouth, international, historical and contemporary design examples of plastic items and uses
Nothe Fort		Weymouth	Military	19th-century fort with important role in World War II, memorabilia, vehicles
Place Mill		Christchurch	Mill	restored Anglo-Saxon watermill, art gallery
Poole Museum		Poole	Local	Local history, ceramics and Poole Pottery, archaeology, maritime and social history, local trades and industries, costume and textiles; formerly known as the Waterfront Museum
Poole Old Lifeboat Museum and Shop		Poole	Maritime	Former lifeboat station and historic lifeboat
Portland Bill Lighthouse		Isle of Portland	Maritime	Lighthouse open for tours
Portland Castle		Weymouth	Military	Operated by English Heritage, 16th century armed castle fort
Portland Museum		Isle of Portland	Local	Local history, geology, maritime heritage, archaeology
Priest's House Museum		Wimborne Minster	Historic house	Rooms furnished in different periods, local history, archaeology
Purbeck Mineral and Mining Museum		Corfe Castle	Mining	Located at the Norden railway station, history and equipment for ball clay mining
Red House Museum, Dorset		Christchurch	Local	information, information, local and social history, natural history, geology, archaeology, costumes
Royal Signals Museum		Blandford Forum	Military	National museum of army communications
Russell-Cotes Art Gallery & Museum		Bournemouth	Art	Fine art and Japanese art in a Victorian mansion
Scaplens Court Museum		Poole	History	medieval building used for education programs, special domestic life demonstrations in August
Shaftesbury Abbey Museum		Shaftesbury	Religious	Artifacts from the ruins of a 15th-century Benedictine nunnery
Sherborne Castle		Sherborne	Historic house	Operated by English Heritage, 16th-century Tudor mansion and gardens
Sherborne House Arts		Bridport	Art	art gallery of the Bridport Arts Centre
Sherborne Museum		Sherborne	Local	Local history, trades, industry, household items
Sherborne Steam & Waterwheel Centre		Sherborne	Technology	restored 19th century waterwheel used to deliver town's water, formerly known as the Castleton Waterwheel Museum
Shire Hall Dorset		Dorchester	Prison	also known as Old Crown Court and Cells, courtroom, cells and stocks restored to appear as during the trial of the Tolpuddle Martyrs in 1834
Stock Gaylard		Sturminster Newton	Historic house	small Georgian country house, gardens and estate
Sturminster Newton Mill		Sturminster Newton	Mill	working watermill
Sturminster Newton Museum		Sturminster Newton	Local	local history, culture
Sutton Poyntz Water Supply Museum		Weymouth	History	history of water supplying, natural history of watersheds, operated by Wessex Water Services
Swanage Museum		Swanage	Local	local history, geology and history of the Jurassic Coast, stone industry, local development of early radar in the UK during World War II
Swanage Railway		Corfe Castle	Railway	Heritage railway and museum located in the converted Goods Shed in Corfe Castle railway station
The Tank Museum		Wool	Military	Tanks and armoured vehicles
Terracotta Warriors Museum		Dorchester	History	replicas of warriors of the Terracotta Army found in China in 1974
Thomas Hardy's Cottage		Higher Bockhampton	Historic house	Operated by the National Trust, birthplace of author Thomas Hardy
Tolpuddle Martyrs Museum		Tolpuddle	History	Trade union history of 19th-century English agricultural labourers who were convicted of swearing a secret oath as members of the Friendly Society of Agricultural Labourers
Town Mill, Lyme Regis		Lyme Regis	Mill	restored working watermill, complex also houses art galleries, a café/restaurant, craft studios and workshops, a bakery, a mill shop and the Miller's garden
Tudor House		Weymouth	Historic house	Early 17th century period merchant's house, operated by the Weymouth Civic Society
Tutankhamun Exhibition		Dorchester	History	Re-creation of the tomb of the ancient Egyptian Pharaoh Tutankhamun
Wareham Town Museum		Wareham	Local	Local history, T. E. Lawrence, archeology, local pottery
West Bay Discovery Centre		West Bay	Local	Visitor centre covering the history of West Bay, housed in a former Methodist chapel
Weymouth Museum		Weymouth	Local	Part of Brewers Quay, local history, culture, maritime history
White Mill, Sturminster Marshall		Sturminster Marshall	Mill	operated by the National Trust, part of the Kingston Lacy estate, restored watermill
Wolfeton House		Charminster	Historic house	Early Tudor and Elizabethan manor house

== Defunct museums ==
- Discovery, interactive hands-on science exhibits, formerly part of Brewers Quay
- Museum of Electricity, Christchurch, closed indefinitely in 2012
- Timewalk, formerly located in Brewers Quay, exhibits on 600 years of local history and the brewing heritage of the building. Closed in 2010.

== See also ==
- Category:Tourist attractions in Dorset
