= Sherborne Museum =

Coordinates: 50.946742°N 2.515694°W

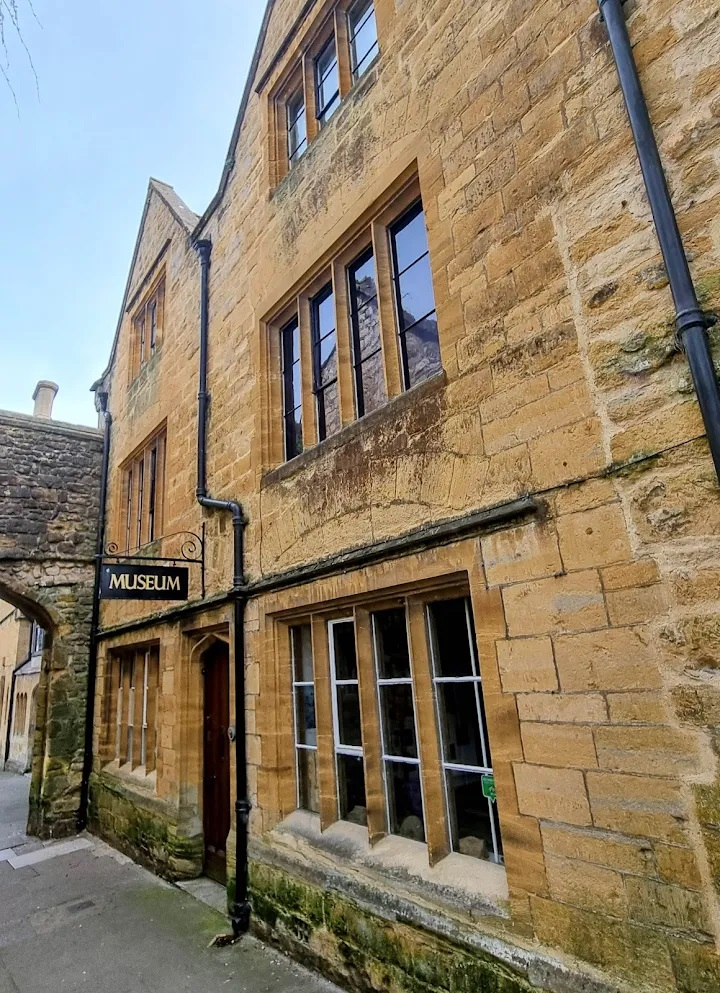
Grade II Listed building housing Sherborne Museum

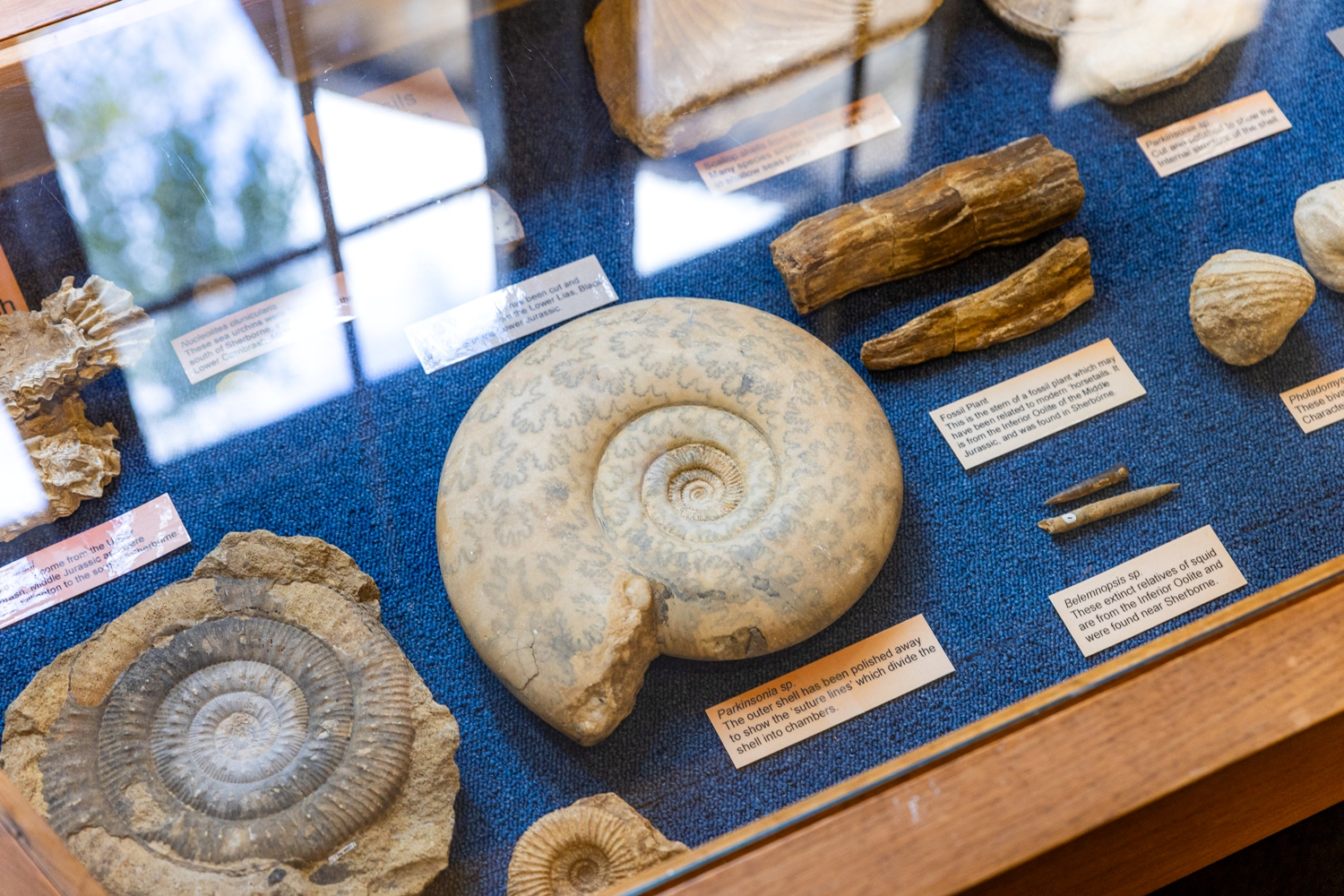
Exhibition case containing display of fossils, mostly from the Middle Jurassic period

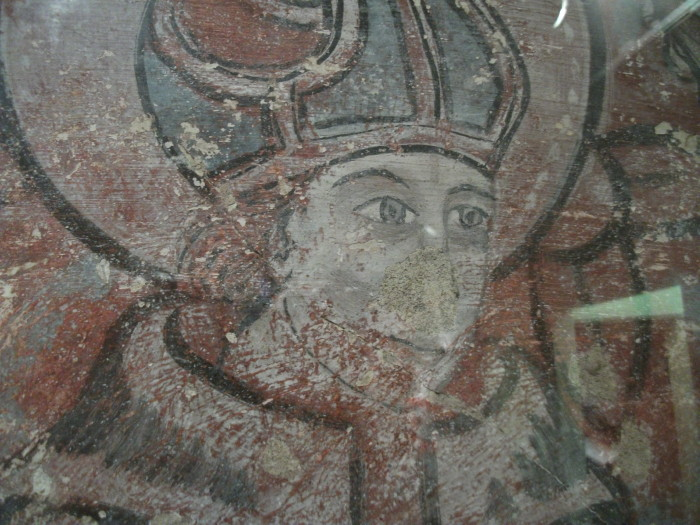
Detail from late 15th century wall painting

Sherborne Museum is an independent, community-run museum located in the centre of Sherborne, Dorset. It is housed in the Abbey Gatehouse, a Grade II listed building situated on Church Lane, a pedestrianised thoroughfare connecting the town's market place with Sherborne Abbey.

The museum is operated as a Charitable Incorporated Organisation and is run by a team of volunteers. In addition to its exhibitions, it also maintains an active outreach and engagement programme, providing handling boxes and activities for schools and delivering reminiscence sessions in local care homes.

Collections reflect the geology, archaeology, natural history, and social and cultural heritage of Sherborne and its surrounding villages. Notable exhibits include an interactive display of the Sherborne Missal, a collection of botanical watercolours, a fully furnished Victorian dolls’ house, and a late fifteenth-century wall painting.

== History ==
The idea of establishing a museum in Sherborne was first discussed in the 1950s among members of the Sherborne Historical Society, with the main impetus coming from local historian and author Reverend Joseph Fowler (1872–1958), whose long-standing interest in recording the town’s history helped to shape early proposals.

In 1966, the Sherborne Museum Association was founded and efforts began to identify a suitable building in which to house the developing collection. The Abbey Gatehouse was selected for its central location and historic character. Formerly the East Gatehouse of the Benedictine abbey, the structure dates from the 15th century and was restored in the late Victorian period. It stands adjacent to the Grade I Listed Abbey Gate (officially the Cemetery Gate), a tall four-centred archway that spans the entrance to Church Lane.

The Abbey Gatehouse was purchased from the Master and Brethren of the Almshouse of St John the Baptist and St John the Evangelist in 1967. The acquisition was made possible owing to an endowment from Frederick Marsden (1897–1981), owner of Sherborne’s fibreglass manufacturing firm, Marglass Limited.

Mrs. Joane Margaret Edwardes, B.A. (1903-1979) was appointed as the first Honorary Curator. The museum was formally opened on 5 May 1968 by Sir Owen Morshead (1893–1977), Royal Librarian Emeritus.

During the 1990s, the adjoining premises in Church Lane became available for purchase. Believed to have been the medieval Almoner’s house, the property includes notable surviving features, such as a ground-floor mullioned corner window of eight round-headed lights and moulded cross-beams in the ceiling. Following a successful application to the Heritage Lottery Fund, the museum acquired and incorporated the building, significantly increasing its exhibition space and visitor facilities.

Accredited status was awarded to the museum in 2007 by the Museums, Libraries and Archives Council in recognition of its growing professionalism and high standards. This continues to be maintained under Arts Council England.

Sherborne Museum has been part of the VisitEngland Visitor Attraction Quality Assurance Scheme (VAQAS) since 2016, during which time it has consistently maintained high standards of customer care and visitor experience. In 2025, the museum was one of twelve attractions across England to receive VisitEngland’s Hidden Gem accolade, an award recognising smaller-scale venues that deliver an exceptional and memorable experience for visitors through high-quality interpretation, engagement, and overall presentation.

== Exhibits ==
The museum aims to display the social, historical and industrial life of the town and its environs since Neolithic times, as well as its natural history. Highlights include fossils from the Inferior Oolite, a unique medieval wall-painting, an electronic touch-screen version of the 15th century Sherborne Missal, a fine Edwardian era dolls' house and 200 watercolours of local flora by the pioneering botanical artist Diana Ruth Wilson (1886-1969). The photographs, postcards and art collection combined form one of the largest private collections of images of a town in this country.
