= Almshouse =

Charitable housing

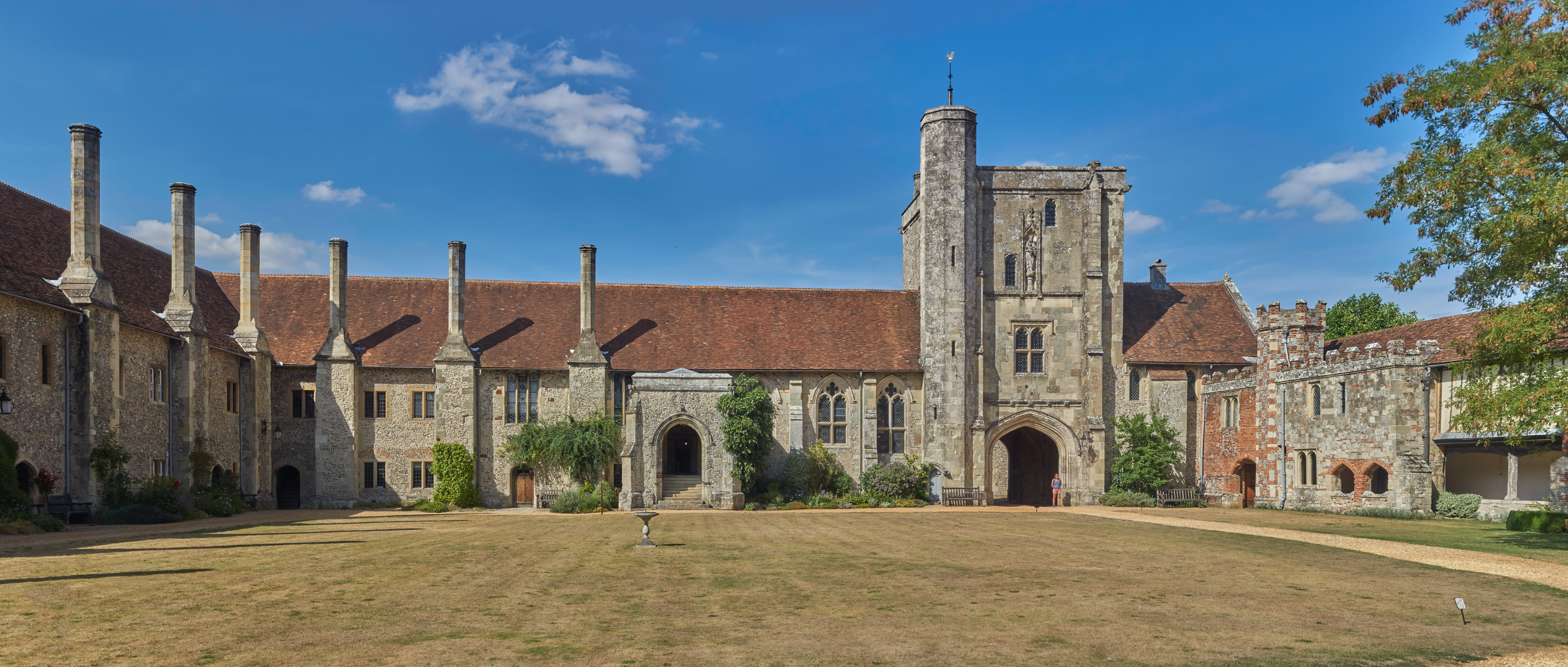
Almshouse, Hospital of St Cross, Winchester

An almshouse is a form of charitable housing that developed in medieval Europe to provide long-term accommodation for people unable to support themselves, most often the elderly or disabled. Originating from earlier hospital foundations associated with Christian charity, almshouses emerged as distinct institutions by the later medieval period, typically housing small numbers of residents rather than the larger, more transient populations found in hospitals. Although found across Europe, their development is most fully documented in England, where they formed part of a wider system of poor relief alongside other charitable and parish-based support.

From the late medieval period, almshouses were established by a wide variety of founders, including clergy, landowners, merchants, and civic groups, and were supported through endowments, donations, and oversight by trustees and local authorities. Their design and role changed over time, particularly after the Reformation and the introduction of poor relief laws, but they continued to provide housing and limited support to their residents. Although they served relatively small numbers throughout their history, almshouses remained an important part of charitable support and remain in use in the United Kingdom today.

== Terminology ==
The term almshouse refers to charitable housing provided for people in need, especially the poor. In the medieval period, such institutions were more often called hospitals, using the older meaning of hospitality. The word almshouse was not used until the 14th century. Medieval records use many different names for these institutions, including hospitals, Maison Dieu, bede-houses, lazar houses, and Godshouses. These terms were often used loosely, and the same institutions could be described in different ways. Some provided care, some offered housing, and many did both.

The word almshouse is also used to distinguish these institutions from workhouses, which were established in the late 17th century as parish-run buildings for the poor and were funded by local taxes. The term poorhouse is sometimes used for institutions housing the poor, but it more commonly refers to later, publicly funded institutions, especially in North America and Scotland, which differed in purpose and organization from almshouses.

== Origins and development ==
The development of almshouses is most fully documented in England. Institutional care for the poor in Europe grew out of early Christian charity, including hospitals that appeared in the Byzantine Empire in the fourth century. In Western Europe, these developed into a range of charitable institutions, from which almshouses later emerged as a distinct form of housing for the poor. Early foundations often took the form of houses of hospitality, offering shelter and basic support to travellers as well as to the sick, infirm, and elderly, and became common in both cities and smaller towns.

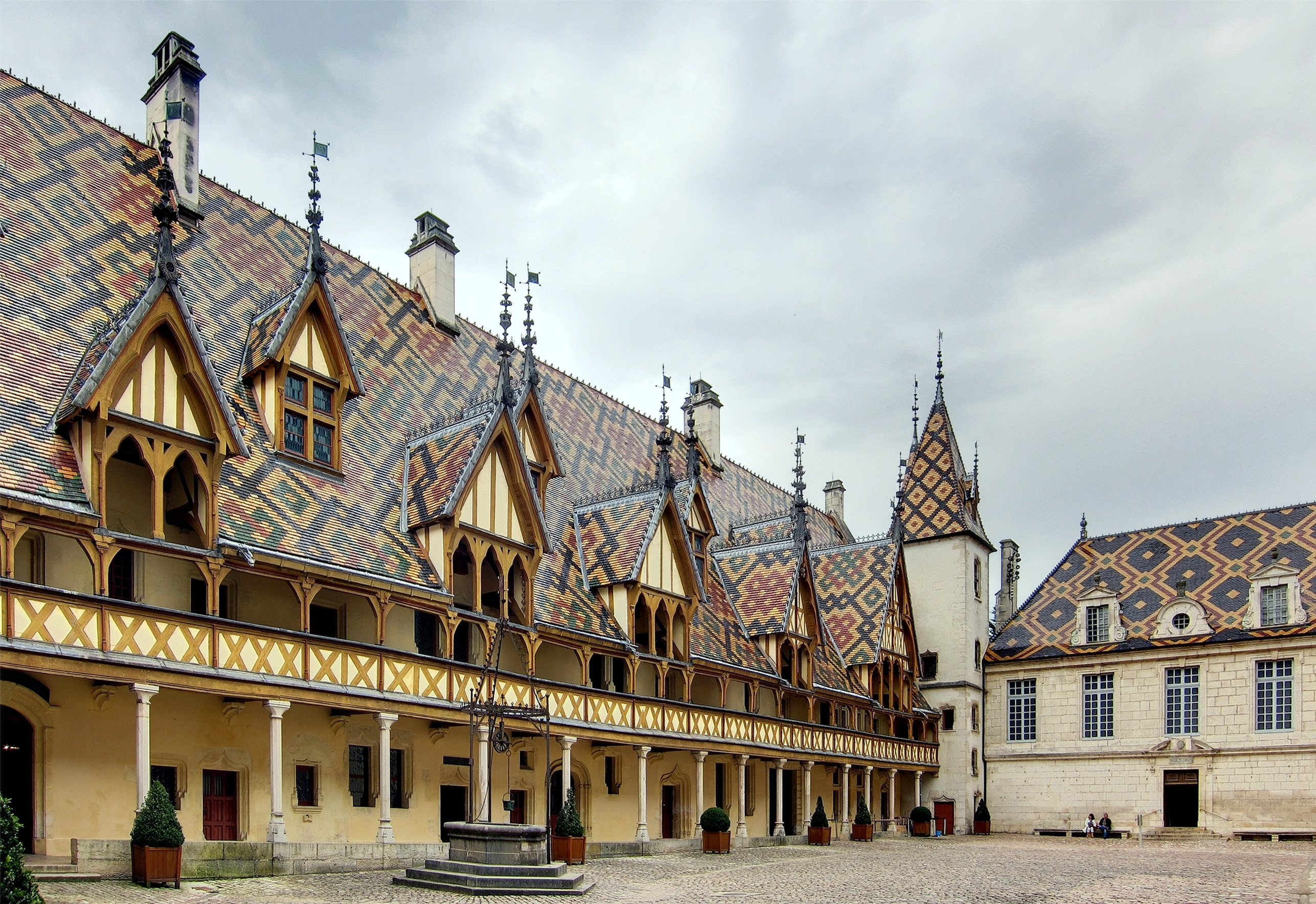
Hospices de Beaune, France

In England, some of the earliest recorded hospitals date from before the Norman Conquest. In the medieval period, hospitals were places of hospitality, providing shelter and basic care rather than medical treatment alone. Almshouses developed from these earlier hospital foundations and were closely connected to both royal and religious authority. Their foundation often required formal approval through licences or charters, particularly when land was granted to provide a permanent income. Many almshouses were supervised by the Church and linked with chantries and devotional practices. Over time, almshouses developed as more specialized institutions, intended for smaller numbers of permanent residents, most often the elderly and infirm.

Hospitals and almshouses formed part of wider systems of poor relief, but served different roles. Hospitals provided accommodation, care, and spiritual services to a broad range of people—including the sick, poor, and travellers—while almshouses were typically intended for a settled group of residents. From the 12th and 13th centuries, some almshouses were founded as permanent homes, while others developed from temporary shelters into long-term residences.

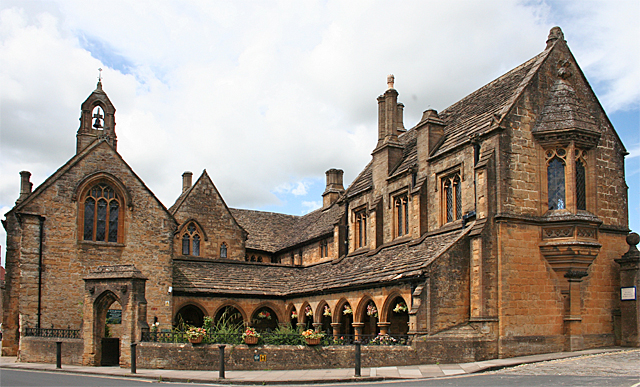
St Johns' Almhouse, Sherborne

In the later medieval era, almshouses became more common, typically housing fewer residents than hospitals and focusing on long-term accommodation rather than care. As leprosy declined, some former leprosy hospitals were adapted for use as almshouses or other forms of charitable housing. From the later 14th century, almshouses were increasingly founded by lay benefactors and typically managed by trustees. Institutions specifically for the elderly remained relatively uncommon until the mid-15th century. By this time, the number of almshouses had increased, and the institution had emerged in a more recognizable form, providing accommodation for older people who had fallen into poverty. This pattern continued into the early modern period, with a marked increase in new foundations between about 1550 and 1650, particularly in towns, reflecting changing approaches to charity and poor relief.

=== Religious foundations ===
Most medieval hospitals in England were closely linked to the Church and often connected to monasteries, convents or other religious institutions. Many were named after saints, showing their religious character. In one study, most hospitals founded before 1350 had religious names, but this declined after 1350 as more were named after founders, places, or other features. The chantry system also shaped charitable foundations. Some almshouses were set up as "bede-houses," where residents were expected to pray for the souls of the founder and their family. Not all almshouses were connected to the Church. Some were founded locally by landowners to support tenants, servants, or neighbors, while others were created for specific groups, such as the homeless, Jews, poor clergy, struggling gentry, or women and children.

=== Relationship to hospitals ===
Almshouses grew out of earlier hospital foundations, but the difference between the two was often unclear. Hospitals cared for a broad range of people, including the sick, the poor, and travellers, and usually provided food, shelter, and spiritual support, while almshouses served a narrower group, most often older or disabled people. Unlike hospitals, almshouses mainly provided housing rather than active care. Residents in almshouses were often expected to provide for themselves, although they might receive small payments or basic supplies such as food or fuel. Many were admitted for life, as long as they followed the rules of the house. Almshouses were generally smaller and less expensive than hospitals, and were more often named for their founders or location. Hospitals, by contrast, tended to be larger, supporting more residents on average. In practice, the boundary between hospitals and almshouses was flexible. Some institutions changed their role over time, and buildings originally founded for one purpose, such as leper hospitals, were later used to house other groups in need.

== Founders and patrons ==
=== Founders ===
Almshouses were founded by people from a wide range of backgrounds, including tradesmen, clergy, merchants, gentry, and wealthy landowners. The wealth and status of both the founders and the institutions they created varied considerably. Establishing an almshouse required substantial resources, and many founders had significant disposable wealth. Although most were men, women also played an important role, acting as founders, co-founders, or executors of family estates, and increasingly establishing foundations in memory of deceased relatives.

Almshouses operated through charitable donations, and were closely linked to royal and Church authority. Trade associations also established almshouses for aged or disabled members, including foundations by livery companies, leather sellers, tanners, clockmakers, drapers, and goldsmiths.

=== Founder motivations ===
Providing for the poor was a shared Christian duty for both Catholics and Protestants, and for many founders it was sufficient motivation. For others, founding and supporting almshouses expressed their social role and values. Among landowners in particular, caring for elderly tenants and local poor people was seen as a sign of status and moral responsibility, and almshouses could also serve as a way to be remembered.

=== Funding and support ===
Establishing an almshouse required a significant financial commitment, including creating a trust and providing a building. Almshouses were supported through a range of sources, including donations, bequests, contributions from parishioners, and, in some cases, income from fairs. Gifts were often left in wills, and charitable giving was encouraged by the Church. Some institutions were also maintained, at least in part, by towns or parishes.

Many almshouses raised funds through organized collection, known as "gathering." Individuals, commonly known as proctors or procurators, were appointed to solicit alms locally or across wider regions, sometimes traveling throughout the country. These collectors were expected to carry written authorization and could be appointed by the master, warden, or patrons of the institution. By the later 16th century, authorized alms-seeking had become more common, but fraud was a growing problem. Permits could be altered or used by unauthorized individuals, and abuses became widespread. Concerns over dishonesty contributed to the abolition of traditional forms of gathering under the Poor Laws of 1598 and 1601.

== Administration and structure ==
=== Governance ===
The founder of an almshouse determined how it was to be governed, often appointing a master, warden, or keeper to manage it. Before 1350, most houses were overseen by religious institutions. Some were founded by monasteries or convents, while others were established by benefactors who placed them under religious supervision, and a few were self-governing.

After 1350, more almshouses came under non-religious control, including management by parishes, guilds, schools, and urban authorities. By the early 16th century, many were supervised by parish officials such as churchwardens. Each foundation was typically incorporated as a separate body, governed by a warden, with its own seal and the authority to make rules. Later foundations, especially after the Reformation, were more commonly administered by trustees or civic bodies connected to local systems of poor relief.

=== Physical layout ===
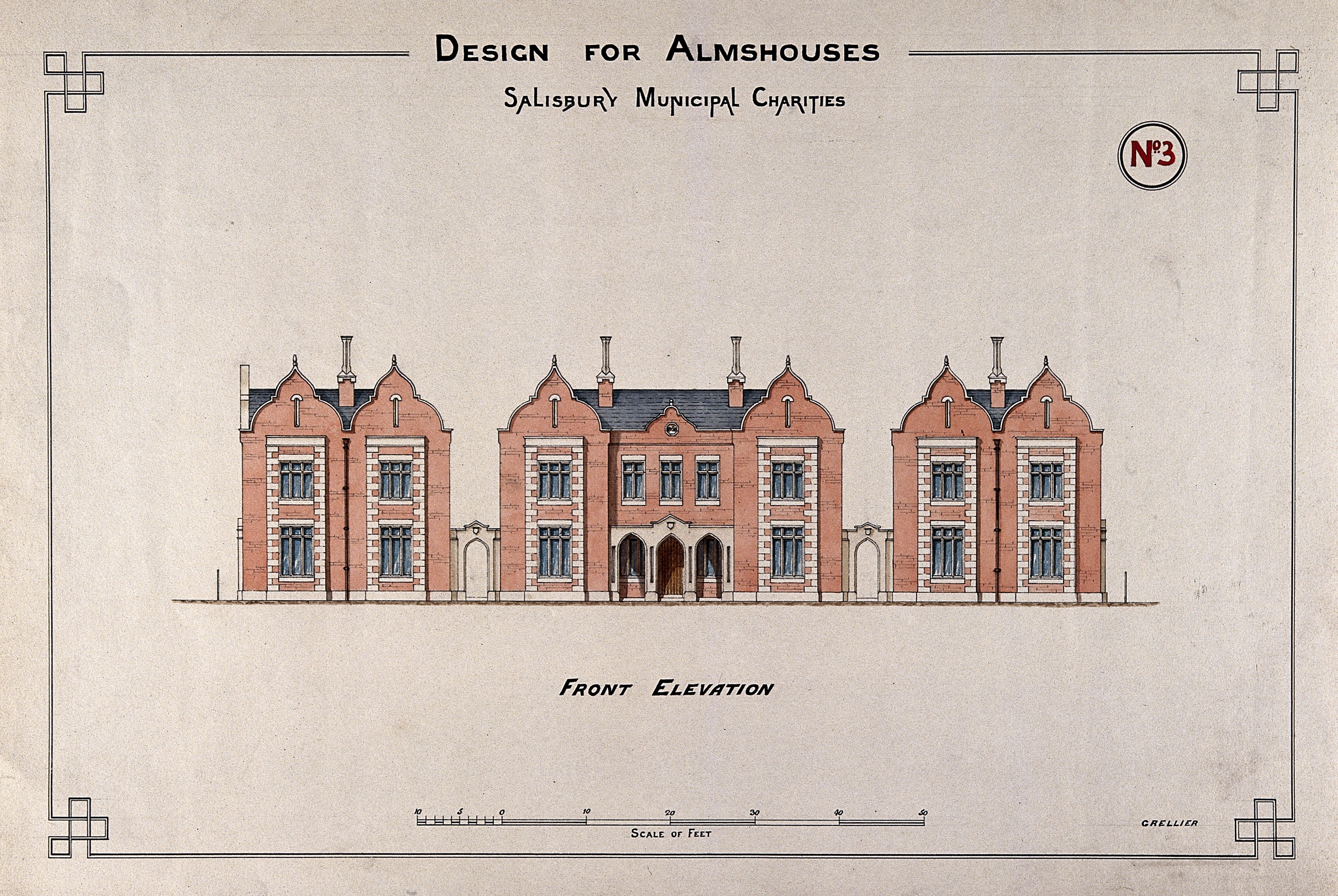
Front elevation, Salisbury Almshouse, 1479

==== Medieval layouts ====
The physical layout of almshouses varied over time, reflecting changes in design and use. The 19th-century antiquarian and architect F. T. Dollman described four main building types linked to medieval almshouses and related hospital foundations: infirmary halls without chapels; infirmary halls with attached chapels, cruciform layouts; and courtyard plans. Most medieval almshouses were small, typically housing between four and thirteen residents.

Almshouses developed from monastic infirmaries, typically arranged as large halls with bed spaces along the walls and were connected to a chapel and, in some cases, a kitchen. These arrangements offered residents little privacy. Similar hall-and-chapel designs were also found elsewhere in Europe, as at the Hospital Of St John in Bruge. From the later medieval period, courtyard designs became more common, with individual living spaces arranged around a central courtyard, often entered through a gate or archway, and with a residence for the master incorporated into the gatehouse.

==== Later developments ====
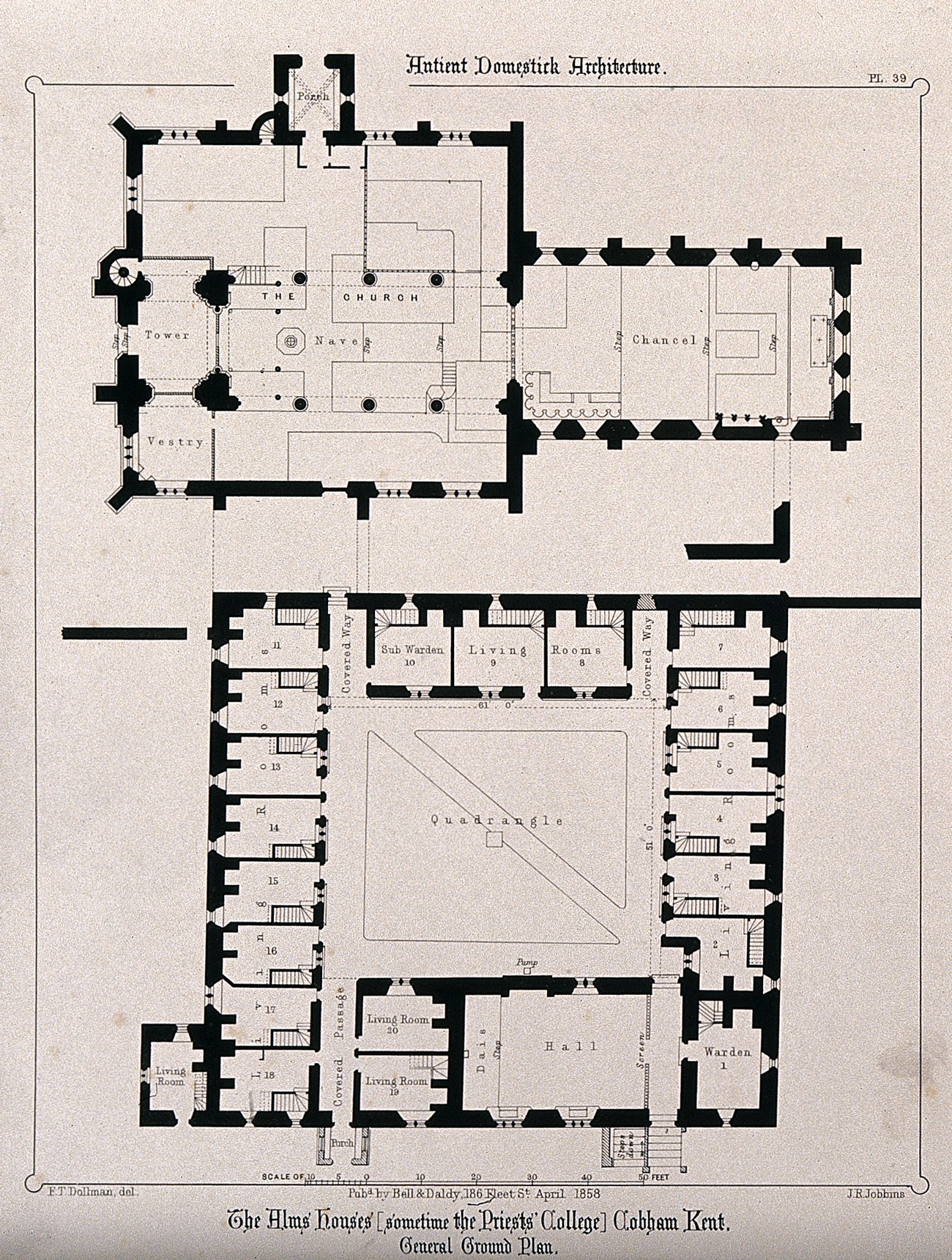
The Almshouses floor plan, Cobham College, 1858

From the later 15th century, almshouses increasingly moved away from communal layouts toward individual living. Residents were housed in separate rooms or small cottages, typically with one or two rooms and their own fireplace for heating and cooking. By the late 16th century, almshouses were commonly built as rows of cottages, usually located in the center of a village or town, near the parish church. This became the most common form in England. These buildings generally lacked chapels, communal areas, or accommodation for the master or warden, and often included small gardens for residents. Similar arrangements were found in the Dutch Republic, and smaller almshouses might take the form of a single house divided into separate living quarters.

In the 19th century, almshouses were typically built in small groups of between five and twelve dwellings, usually single-storey and modest in design, and were found in towns and villages across England. Most surviving almshouses reflect this vernacular cottage form, shaped by local building traditions and materials, and some were adapted from existing private houses.

More generous foundations sometimes included architectural features such as gatehouses, porches, or enclosed courtyards, and in a few cases retained a chapel for worship. Separate and more comfortable accommodation was often provided for the master or warden.

== Daily life ==
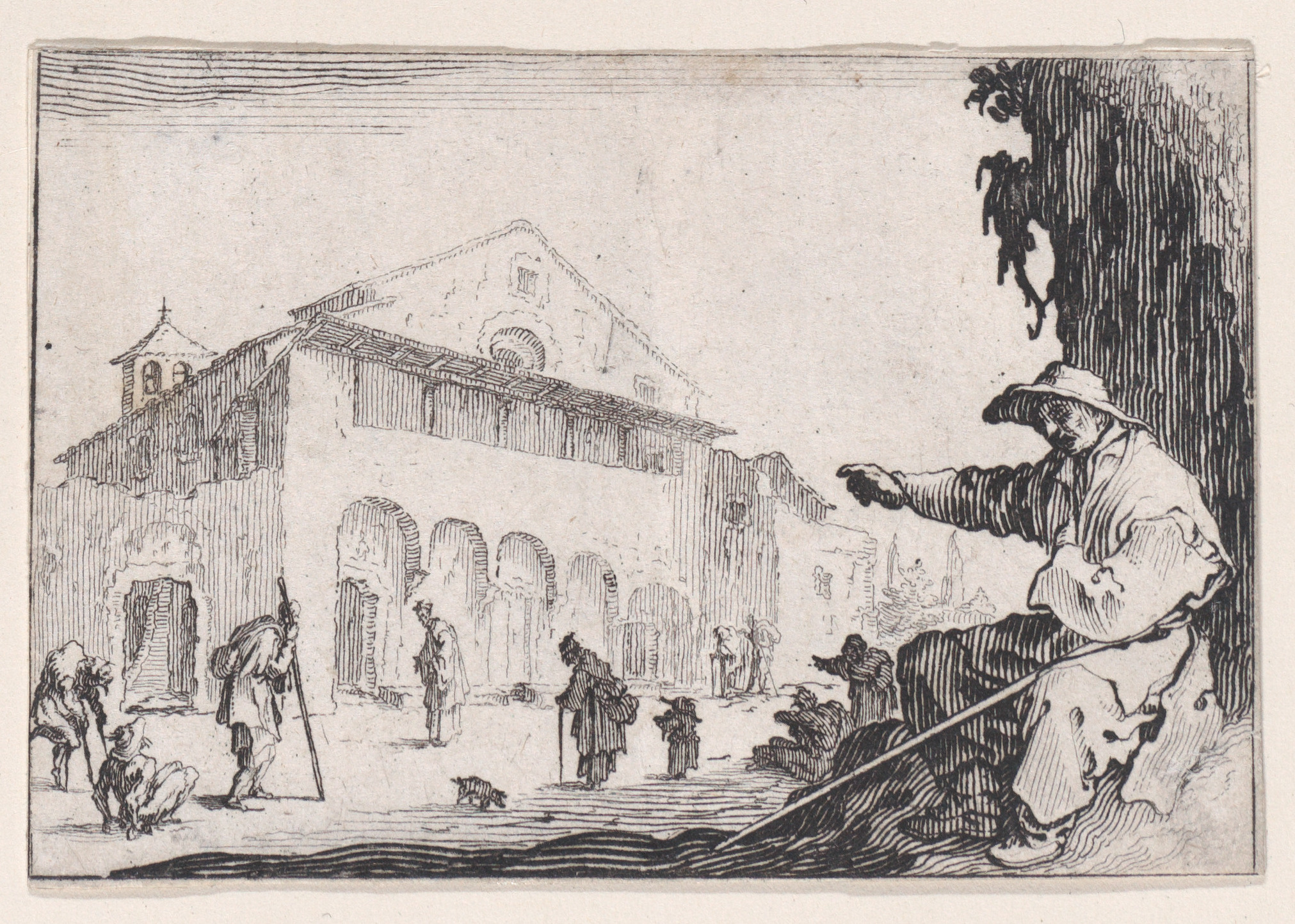
"Almshouse", by Jaques Callot, 17th century

=== Admissions ===
Rules set by founders or trustees governed admission, selection, and the support provided. The most common requirement was that residents lived in the immediate neighborhood or parish. Applicants were often expected to be elderly (though rarely a fixed age), as well as ill or incapacitated, and some houses excluded those considered disorderly, such as fighters, gamblers, beggars, or brawlers. The lame and the blind were an important group, and often given priority.

Some almshouses required an entry payment or expected residents to supply basic personal items such as clothing or bedding, indicating that they were not always destitute. Living arrangements varied: some houses admitted single men, single women, married couples, or families, while others restricted residents to individuals, sometimes requiring older children to be placed in service.

=== Resident population ===
Most information about almshouse residents comes from institutional records, as few first-person accounts survive from before 1800. From the 15th century onward, residents were typically elderly or disabled people who had previously supported themselves but had fallen into need through illness, injury, or old age.

Although many residents were poor, others had small incomes, particularly in institutions that required entrance payments. Some urban almshouses also housed children temporarily before placing them in service or apprenticeships. By the later medieval period, almshouses were intended primarily for residents rather than clergy, and commonly housed both single individuals and married couples. Some institutions were founded for specific groups, such as former servants, elderly sailors or soldiers, widows of clergy, or members of particular households. After 1540, many almshouses focused more narrowly on needy people unable to work, with preference often given to those affected by illness, military service, or sudden loss of property.

Although almshouses supported relatively small numbers, they played a limited but important role within wider systems of poor relief. After the Black Death, when the population was lower, informal charity was often able to meet the needs of many people facing hardship.

==== Life in the almshouses ====
Daily life differed by foundation, but most residents received support in cash or in kind, including regular payments, fuel such as firewood, and occasional clothing allowances. Food was sometimes provided in a shared hall or distributed to individuals, and residents were often referred to as "brothers" and "sisters". Early almshouses were typically communal, with residents sleeping in shared dormitories and eating in a common hall. Over time, separate accommodation became more common, and men and women often lived and dined separately, reflecting the growing number of female residents.

Food arrangements varied widely. In some houses, residents were expected to provide their own food from personal resources, supplemented by basic allowances, while others required communal cooking and dining. At St Bartholomew's Hospital in Sandwich, Kent, for example, residents cooked together in a shared kitchen, contributing their own food to a common pot prepared by a cook. They also shared bread, cheese, and butter, and were permitted a jug of ale on Sundays.

Some almshouses required residents to wear distinctive clothing, such as the red cloaks and bonnets for women and blue coats and hats for men at St Johns' House in Sherborne in Dorset.

==== Rules and regulations ====
Some almshouses had formal rules for their residents, though many did not. Where they did, they typically required attendance at church and prayer, especially in houses with chapels or chantry functions. They also expected residents to live peaceably, cleanly, and morally, avoiding swearing, drunkenness, gambling, taverns, and sexual misconduct. Residents were required to keep their rooms and shared spaces clean, carry out basic chores, and limit time away from the house. Discipline was usually overseen by a master or warden, often a clergyman, though in houses without regular supervision it fell to parish officials. Penalties for misconduct could include fines, loss of allowances, or expulsion, but rules were not always strictly enforced, and removal could be difficult once a resident had been admitted.

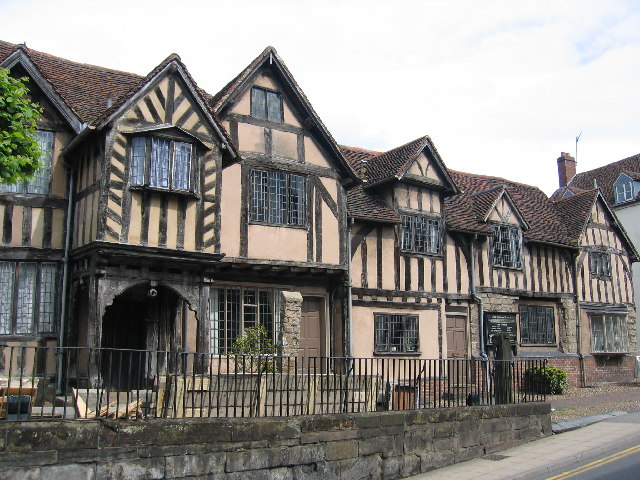
Lord Lycester almshouses, 16th century

== Dissolution of religious institutions ==
During the early stages of the English Reformation in the 1530s and 1540s, the dissolution of the monasteries (1536–1539), followed by the abolition of chantries (1545–1547) and the suppression of religious guilds (1548), had a major impact on almshouses and other forms of support for the poor. Many almshouses were closely tied to these institutions, either as chantries or through monastic support, and their suppression led to widespread closure, reduction, or transfer to secular control, often with the loss of their endowments. Estimates suggest that over 500 almshouses existed before the Reformation, but their number fell by about half by the mid-16th century, with roughly 260 hospitals and endowed almshouses closed between 1536 and 1549. The decline of these religious foundations reduced traditional forms of relief and contributed to growing concern about poverty, prompting new approaches to poor relief later in the 16th century.

In the years following the Dissolution, few almshouses were established for more than 30 years. In the longer term, almshouse foundations became more widely distributed, with new houses established in villages and small towns as well as in the cathedral cities and former monastic centres where they had previously been concentrated.

== Post-Reformation ==
=== Decline of religious foundations ===
Following the Dissolution of the Monasteries, the number of almshouses and hospitals declined sharply as many religious foundations were closed. Those that remained, and those established after 1540, differed from their medieval predecessors in several ways: they were generally smaller, supported fewer people, and were more often intended for the elderly poor, particularly women, at a time of rapid population growth.

Some earlier houses survived, especially smaller or locally supported institutions, and were sometimes reorganized under new governance. At Lambourn, for example, the chantry chapel attached to Estbury's almshouse was dissolved in 1547, but the almshouse continued and was re-established under trustees in 1589. From the later 16th century, more almshouses were founded in towns and cities by guilds, civic groups, and private benefactors. Post-Reformation almshouses were less closely tied to religious institutions. While religious observance remained important, many no longer maintained chapels or resident clergy, and residents typically attended services in the parish church. Their purpose shifted increasingly toward providing housing and support for the aged and disabled in line with new public poor relief laws, including the Elizabethan Poor Law of 1601.

Smaller charitable foundations without permanent endowments, along with parish and church housing, were likely more widespread than surviving records suggest and may have made a significant contribution to poor relief in early modern England.

=== Revival of almshouses ===
In the later 16th century, almshouse foundations increased, particularly for the elderly and disabled. From about 1550 to 1650, new houses were established in increasing numbers in response to population growth and rising poverty. Many towns founded at least one almshouse during this period, though they were less common in rural parishes.

Post-Reformation almshouses differed in several respects from earlier foundations. They placed greater emphasis on individual living, with most residents provided their own rooms with fireplaces for cooking and heating. Communal dining became less common, and some institutions included gardens for individual use. Their religious identity was generally weaker, and practices such as begging were sometimes prohibited, with residents instead expected to work if able. Almshouses for women became more common, and in mixed institutions women often outnumbered men, though they typically remained subordinate within the household structure.

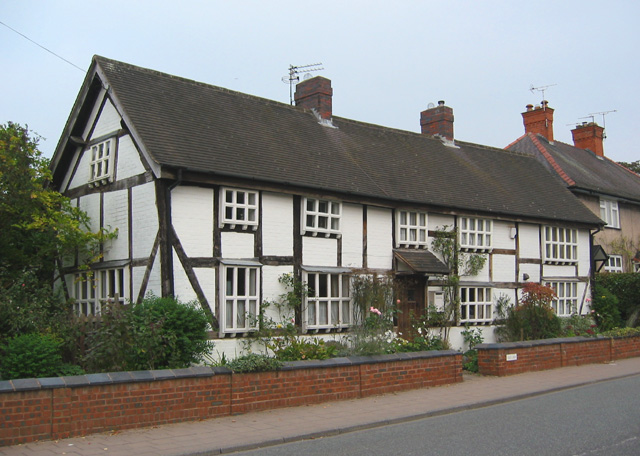
Wilbrahams almshouses, 1613

=== Elizabethan poor laws ===
The Elizabethan era brought major changes in poor relief and charity, including the Poor Laws of 1598 and 1601. These laws reshaped how almshouses operated. They ended practices such as licensed begging and made it easier to found and support new institutions, helping to sustain almshouses and other forms of charity in later periods. The changes were less helpful for existing almshouses without adequate endowments. The abolition of licensed alms-gathering removed an important source of income, only partly replaced by local funds. As a result, many houses came under new forms of management, including charitable trusts, urban authorities, merchant companies, and parish oversight.

Responsibility for poor relief also shifted to the parish, which raised funds through local taxes and provided support, including housing, for those unable to support themselves. This expanded local provision but did not replace almshouses, which continued to operate alongside parish relief. By 1660, there were an estimated 1,000 almshouses in England, but parish-based poor relief had become the main system of support.

=== Workhouses and the decline of almshouses ===
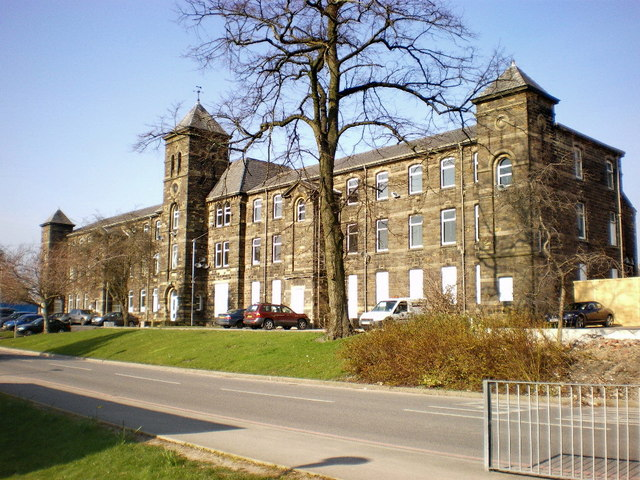
Burnley Union workhouse

Workhouses, introduced from the late 17th century, were parish-run institutions funded by local taxes to house the poor. Unlike almshouses, which were selective and supported by endowments, workhouses were part of the poor relief system and usually could not refuse those who qualified for support. During the 17th and 18th centuries, spending on poor relief increased and attitudes toward poverty shifted, with greater emphasis on work and discipline. Measures such as the requirement for recipients to wear badges, introduced in 1697, reflected these views. The Workhouse Test Act of 1723 encouraged parishes to establish workhouses as the preferred form of relief. In practice, however, most poor people continued to receive support within the community.

Almshouses in this period were most often found in older towns, including cathedral towns and places that had grown significantly in the 16th and 17th centuries, when founding almshouses was a common form of philanthropy. After 1730, new almshouse foundations declined, and some existing houses fell into neglect, as workhouses were increasingly favored as a more economical way to support larger numbers of people.

== Victorian era ==
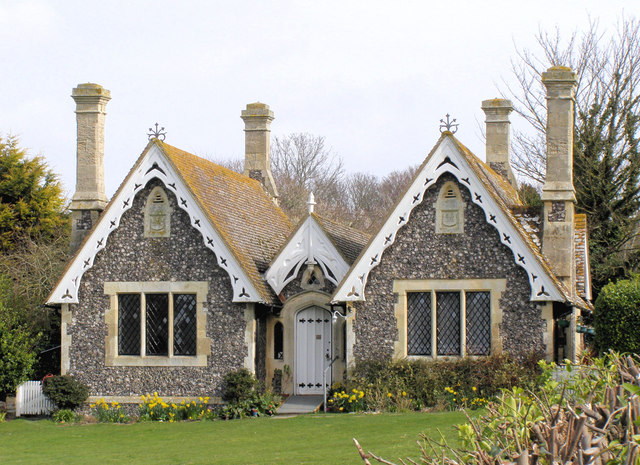
Victorian almshouse, Bishopstone

In the 19th century, particularly during the Victorian period, the building of almshouses increased after a long period of decline. Many surviving almshouses date from the Victorian period, with estimates suggesting that more than 30% were built at this time. Rapid industrial growth and the expansion of towns drew attention to the living conditions of poorer populations. At the same time, dissatisfaction with the workhouse system introduced under the Poor Law Amendment Act of 1834 led some donors to support other forms of assistance. New almshouses were founded by local benefactors, including industrialists and merchants. They were usually built as rows or groups of separate dwellings rather than large shared institutions, and often designed in decorative historic styles, such as Gothic Revival or Tudor Revival. They were generally intended for older people with limited income who were considered deserving of support.

== Regional development ==
=== Western Europe ===
Almshouses were established across Western Europe during the medieval period, often linked to hospitals, confraternities, or other charitable foundations. In some regions, including France and the Low Countries, they provided long-term accommodation for the poor and elderly, while others functioned more like hospitals or hospices. Almshouses were found in both cities and smaller towns, where they offered basic support and lodging for the poor. They were typically smaller than urban hospitals and operated under a less formal religious organization, although both provided long-term care and essential support.

==== France ====
In France and other parts of Western Europe, poor relief increasingly came under the control of urban authorities from the late medieval period onward. Municipal governments used institutions such as hospitals to house and support the poor, reflecting a broader shift toward organized, civic charity. Distinctions between the "deserving" and "undeserving" poor became increasingly important, and relief was often directed toward local residents rather than outsiders.

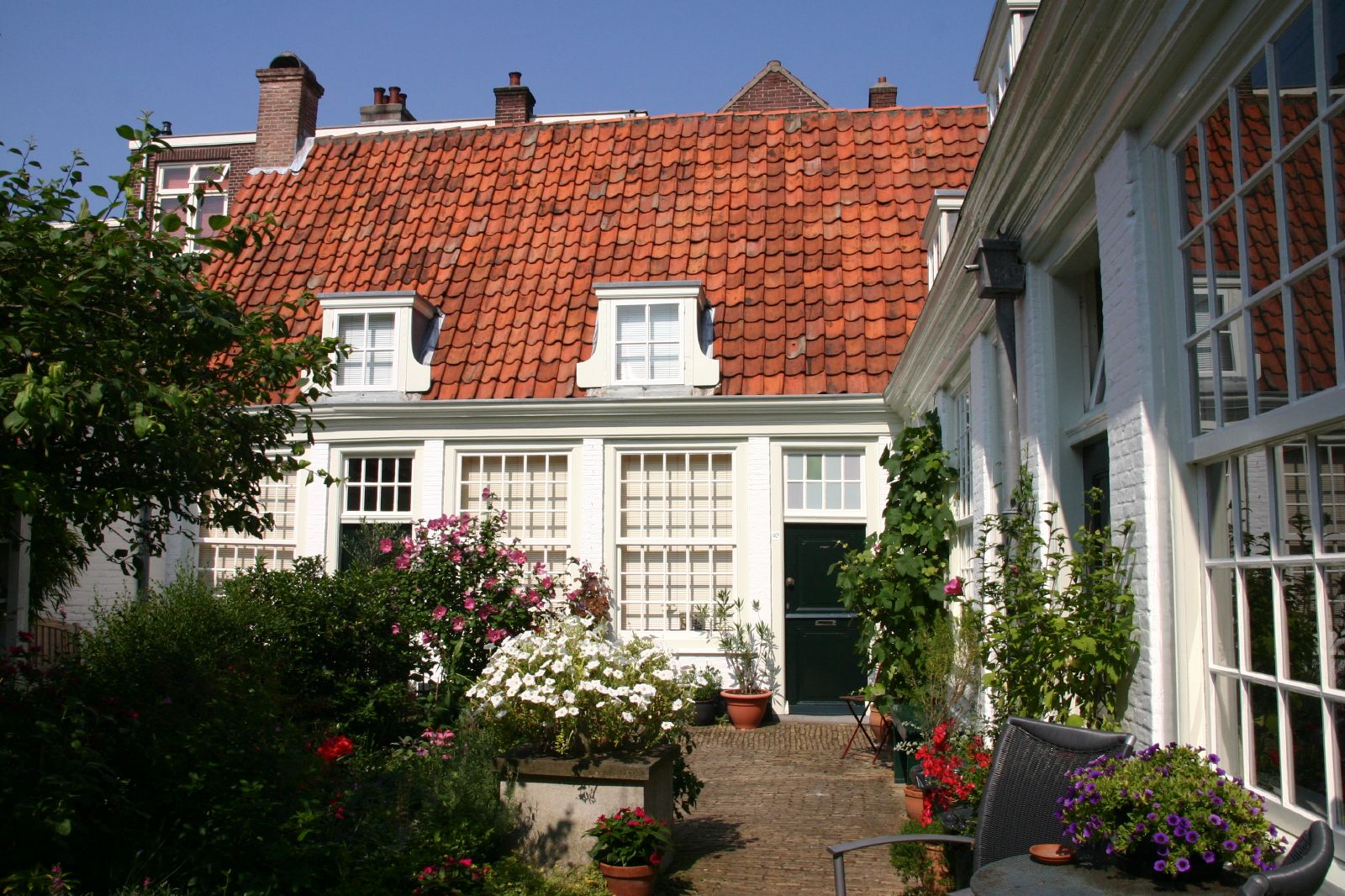
Hofje of Gurrtje de Waal, Netherlands

==== Netherlands ====
The system of poor relief in the Netherlands (then the Dutch Republic) differed from that of England. While the English system was based on laws passed by Parliament and funded through local taxation, welfare in the Dutch Republic relied primarily on private and voluntary donations. Almshouses formed one part of a wider range of institutions for the poor. English almshouses and Dutch hofjes were not the same, reflecting these differences in organization and funding, but their development followed similar patterns. In both England and the Netherlands, almshouses developed in part from medieval hospitals associated with religious foundations and, by the later medieval period, evolved into institutions providing housing for elderly people who had fallen into poverty through age or illness.

==== Scotland ====
In medieval and early modern Scotland, hospitals and almshouses primarily supported the poor rather than providing medical treatment. They provided housing and basic care for people affected by poverty, age, and illness. Because Scotland had fewer large towns than many areas of Western Europe, care was provided through many small, local institutions rather than a few large hospitals, and some continued to operate after the Reformation. Archaeological evidence suggests that around 170 of these institutions existed in medieval Scotland.

=== North America ===
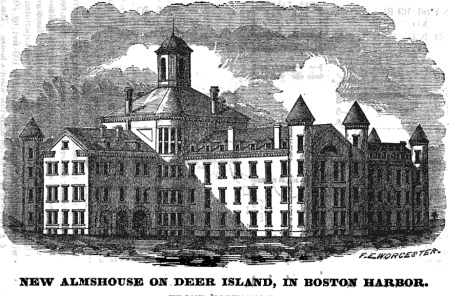
Almshouse, Boston, 1851

==== United States ====
In the United States, "almshouse" referred to institutions that differed from their medieval European counterparts, as there were very few private charitable endowments or religious welfare organizations in North America. While early almshouses were influenced by English charitable traditions, they developed into publicly funded institutions under local government control. Commonly known as poorhouses, they housed a wide range of dependent populations, including the elderly, disabled, unemployed, children and the mentally ill.

==== Canada ====
Systems of poor relief in Canada developed differently under French and British colonial rule. In colonial New France, charitable assistance was organized largely through Catholic religious orders, supported in part by the French colonial government. These institutions provided care for the poor, elderly, and sick, and differed from the almshouse and poorhouse systems that later developed in English North America.

In British North America, systems of poor relief varied widely by colony. Some colonies, such as Nova Scotia and New Brunswick, adopted legislation influenced by the English Poor Laws, placing responsibility on local communities, while others relied more on informal support through families, churches, and voluntary charity. As a result, institutional care for the poor developed unevenly, and in some areas remained limited or absent.

== Almshouses today ==
Almshouses continue in use in the United Kingdom as a small form of charitable housing. About 1,600 independent charities provide accommodation for approximately 36,000 residents. They are run by trustees and regulated as charities, with admission often based on age, financial circumstances, and local or work connections. Funding comes from a mix of historic endowments, investments, and donations. Residents usually pay a small weekly sum, but do not hold standard tenancies, instead occupying their homes as beneficiaries of the charity.

Although many historic buildings have been updated, almshouses remain as independent, low-cost housing, primarily for older people with limited financial resources. Examples still in use include St Mary's Hospital Almshouses, Ewelme Almshouses, Drapers' Almshouses, and Blythe Cottages.

== Gallery ==
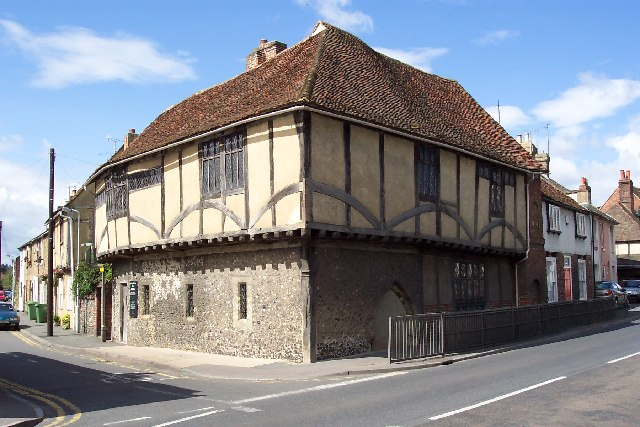
Maison Dieu Hospital and Almshouse, 13th century

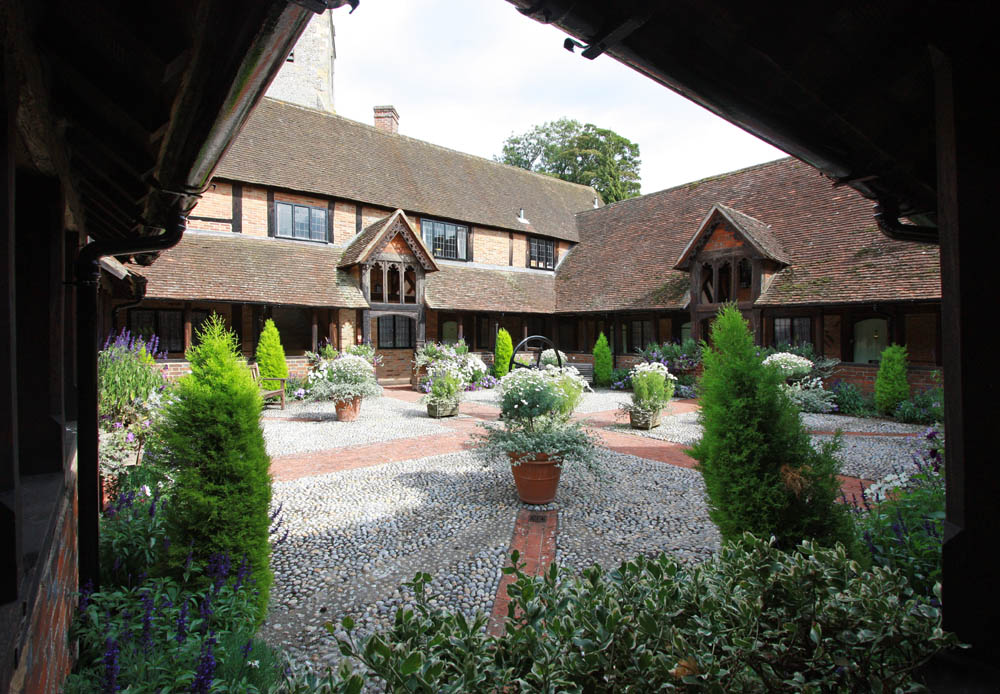
Ewelme Almshouses, Oxfordshire, 15th century

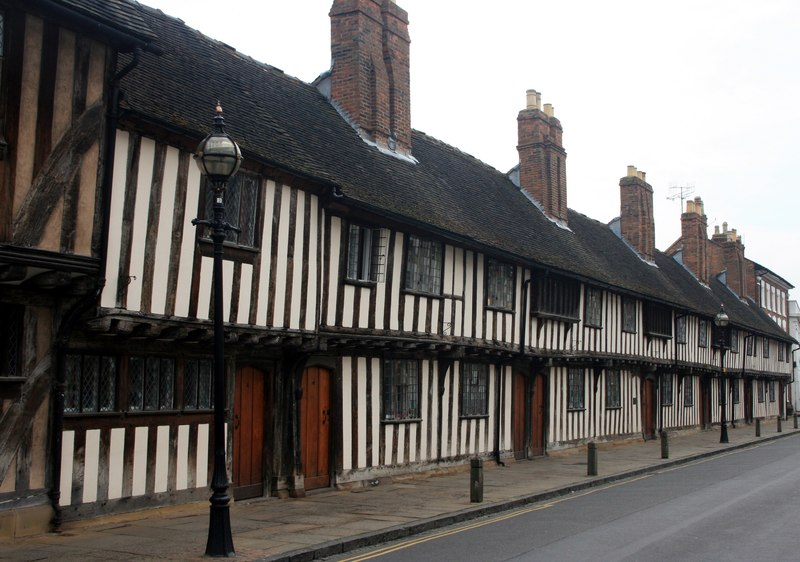
Stratford-on-Avon Almshouses, 16th century

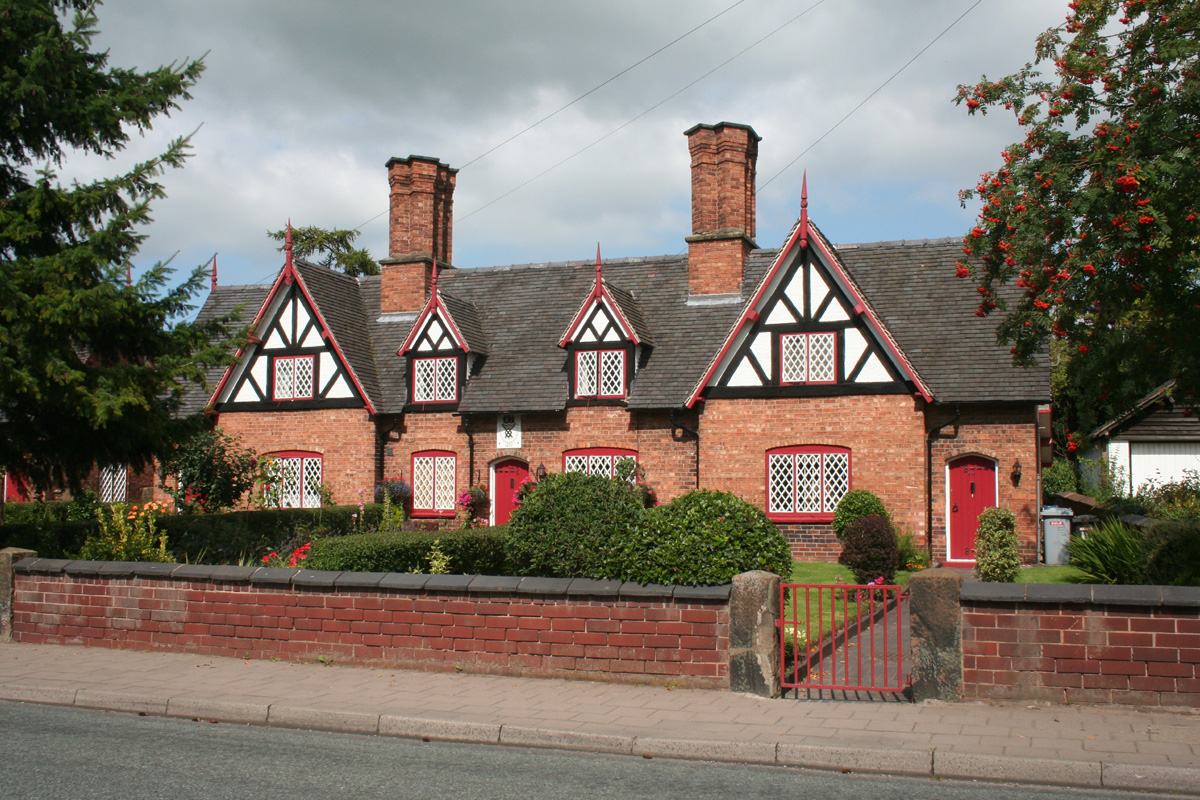
Tollemache Almshouses, Cheshire, 17th century

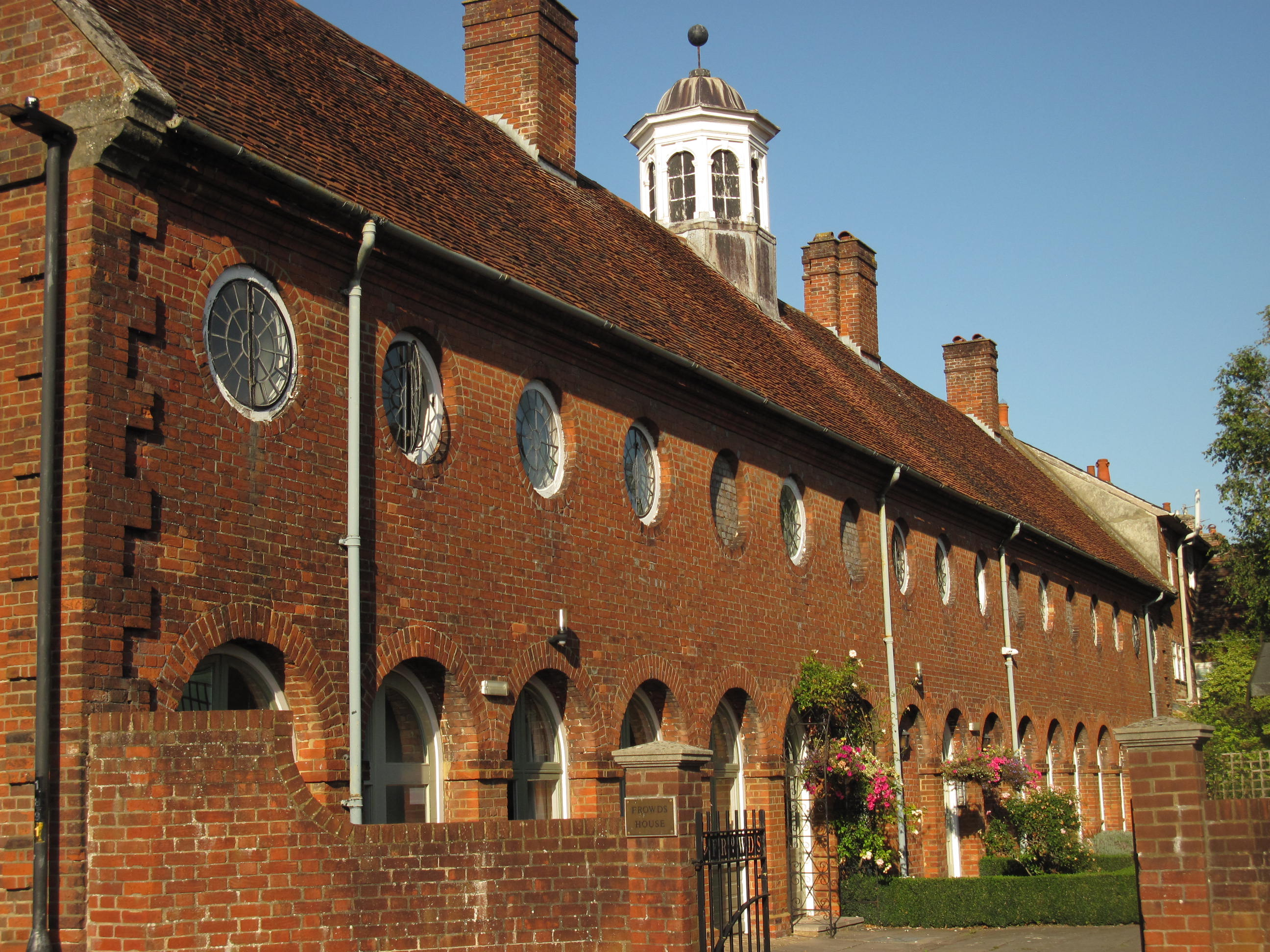
Frowds Almshouses, Salisbury, 18th century

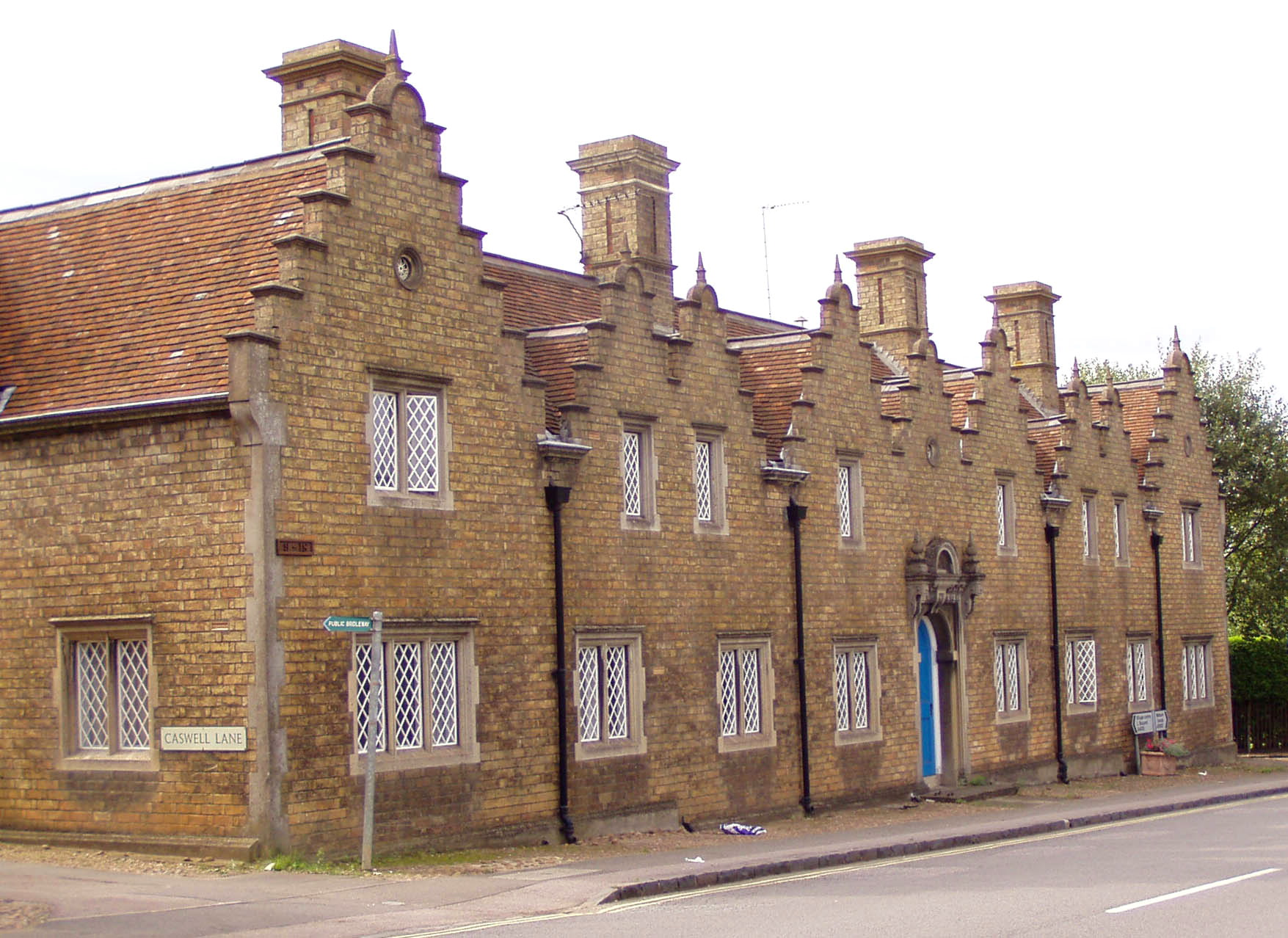
Almshouses, Woburn, Bedfordshire, 19th century

== See also ==
- History of poverty in the United Kingdom
- List of almshouses in the United Kingdom

== Sources ==
=== Books ===
- Bailey, Brian (1988). Almshouses. London: Robert Hale. ISBN 978-0709032922.
- Clay, Rotha Mary (1909). The Medieval Hospitals of England. London: Methuen & Co – via Internet Archive.
- Dollman, Francis T. (1858). Examples of Ancient Domestic Architecture: Illustrating the Hospitals, Bede-Houses, Schools, Almshouses, of the Middle Ages in England. London: Bell and Daldy – via Google Books.
- Finkel, Alvin (2012). Social Policy and Practice in Canada: A History. Wilfrid Laurier University Press. ISBN 978-1554588862.
- Guest, Dennis (2001). The Emergence of Social Security in Canada. UBC Press. ISBN 978-0774805513.
- Godfrey, Walter H. (1955). The English Almshouse, with some account of its predecessor, the Medieval Hospital. London: Faber and Faber.
- Howson, Brian (2008). Almshouses: A Social and Architectural History. The History Press. ISBN 978-0752442587.
- Howson, Brian (1993). Noble Poverty: A History of the English Almshouse. Russel Sage. ISBN 978-1873335024.
- Jordan, W.K. (1959). Philanthropy in England, 1480-1660: a Study of the Changing Pattern of English Social Aspirations. New York: Belleveu Books.
- Leonard, E.M. (1900). The Early History of English Poor Relief. Cambridge University – via Internet Archive.
- McIntosh, Marjorie Keniston (2012). Poor Relief in England: 1350–1600. Cambridge University Press. ISBN 978-1107015081.
- Mollat, Michel (1986). The Poor in the Middle Ages, And Essay in Social History. Yale University Press. ISBN 978-0300046052.
- Nicholls, Angela (2017). Almshouses in Early Modern England: Charitable Housing in the Mixed Economy of Welfare (1550–1725). The Boydell Press. ISBN 978-1783271788.
- Orme, Nicholas; Webster, Margaret (1995). The English Hospital, 1070–1570. London: Yale University Press. ISBN 978-0300060584.
- Trattner, Walter I. (2007). From Poor Law to Welfare State: A History of Social Welfare in America. Simon and Schuster. ISBN 978-1416593188.
- Wagner, David (2005). The Poorhouse: America's Forgotten Institution. Rowman & Littlefield. ISBN 978-0742529458.

=== Journals ===
- Goose, Nigel; Basten, Stuart (2009). "Almshouse Residency in Nineteenth Century England". Famiy and Community History. 12 (1): 65–76. doi:10.1179/175138109X437362.
- Goose, Nigel; Looijesteijn, Henk (2012). "Almshouses in England and the Dutch Republic circa 1350-1800: A Comparative Perspective". Journal of Social History. 45 (4): 1049–1073. doi:10.1093/jsh/shr146. hdl:20.500.11755/1abd2103-8851-433b-aa2d-b161fe3e2218.
- McCallum, John (2014). "Nurseries of the Poore": Hospitals and Almshouses in Early Modern Scotland". Journal of Social History. 48 (2): 427–449. doi:10.1093/jsh/shu078.
- Murphy, Neill (2022). "Plague hospitals and poor relief in late medieval and early modern France". Journal of Social History. 7 (4): 349–371. doi:10.1080/03071022.2022.2112859.
- Tomkins, Alannah (2015). "Almshouse versus Workhouse: Residential Welfare in 18th Century Oxford". Family and Community History. 7 (4): 45–58. doi:10.1179/fch.2004.7.1.006.
