= Royal Signals Museum =

- Shown in Dorset
- Established: 1930s (opened on present site 1967)
- Location: Blandford Camp, Tarrant Monkton, Dorset
- Coordinates: 50.868°N 2.125°W
- Type: Regimental museum
- Website: www.royalsignalsmuseum.com

The Royal Signals Museum is a military museum based at Blandford Camp in the civil parish of Tarrant Monkton, northwest of the town of Blandford Forum in Dorset, England. The museum traces the history of the British Army's battlefield communications experts from the introduction of the telegraph in the Crimean War to the secretive story of cryptography and cyber warfare.

== History ==
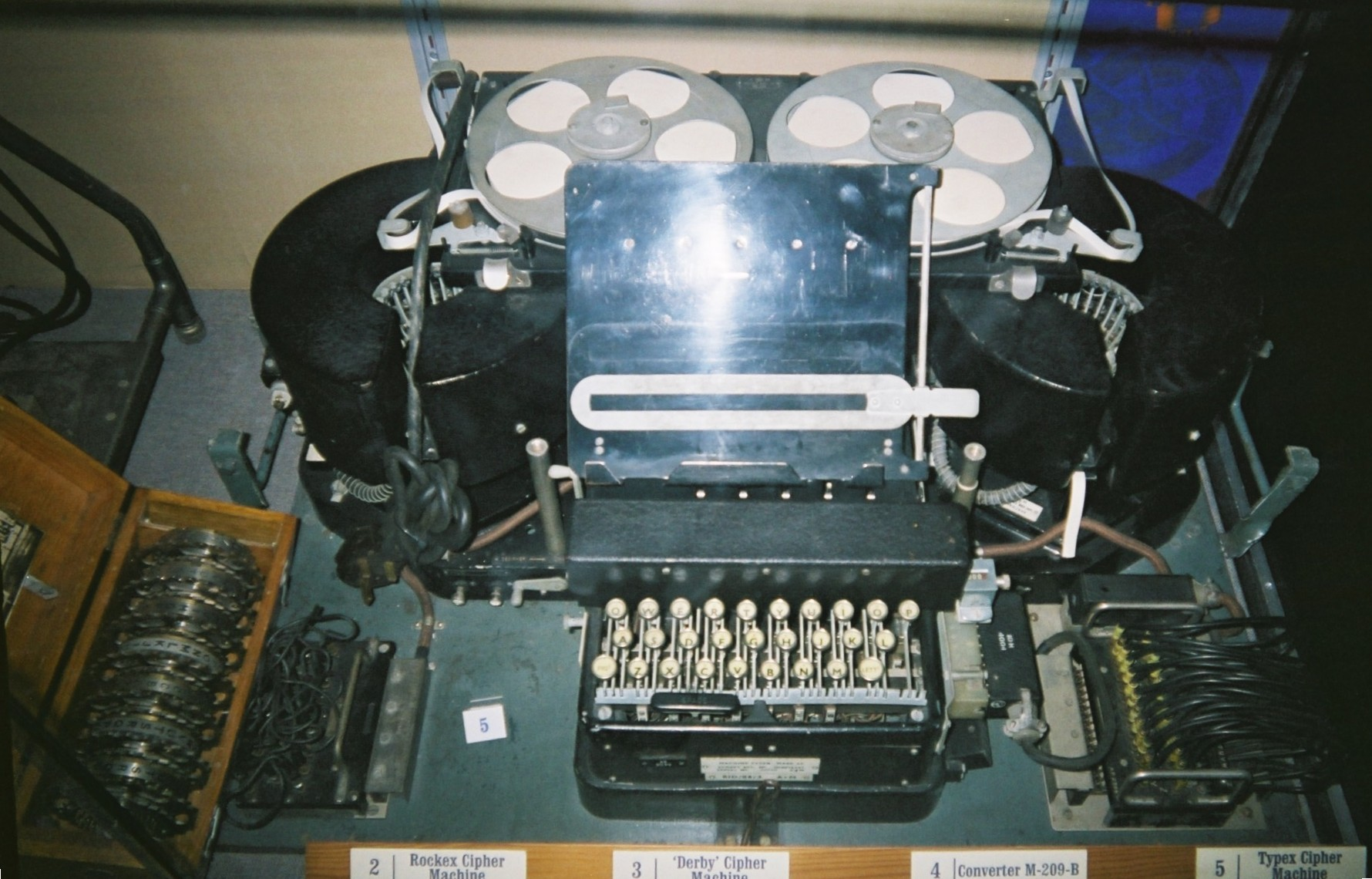
Typex machine at the museum

The Royal Signals Museum was founded in Catterick, North Yorkshire during the 1930s. It moved to its current location of Blandford Camp in 1967. An appeal which generated £1 million enabled the construction of a new wing in 1995 and complete refurbishment of the exhibits completed in 1997. The museum was reopened in its new form on 28 May 1997. The museum is a member of the Dorset Museums Association.

== Collections ==
The museum hosts both permanent and temporary exhibitions. The museum holds the national collection of army communications. It presents the role of communications in wars and military campaigns over the last 150 years. One of the objects on display includes a chair used by senior Ashanti chiefs when seated in public. Based on a European folding chair, the object was presented by Major General Sir Reginald Curtis in 1921. The museum displays a number of objects worn by Eric Lomax during his time as a Japanese POW, Pigeon NS 15125 William of Orange who received the Dickin Medal, as well as the Ptarmigan message centre. The museum also displays one of the world's last remaining cable wagons, which saw service between 1911 and 1937. In 2020, an exhibition named "History of the Royal Signals in 100 Objects" was launched to celebrate the Corps Centenary.

== See also ==
- List of museums in Dorset
- Royal Corps of Signals
