= Bournemouth Natural Science Society =

Natural Science Society

Coordinates: 50.722418°N 1.856244°W

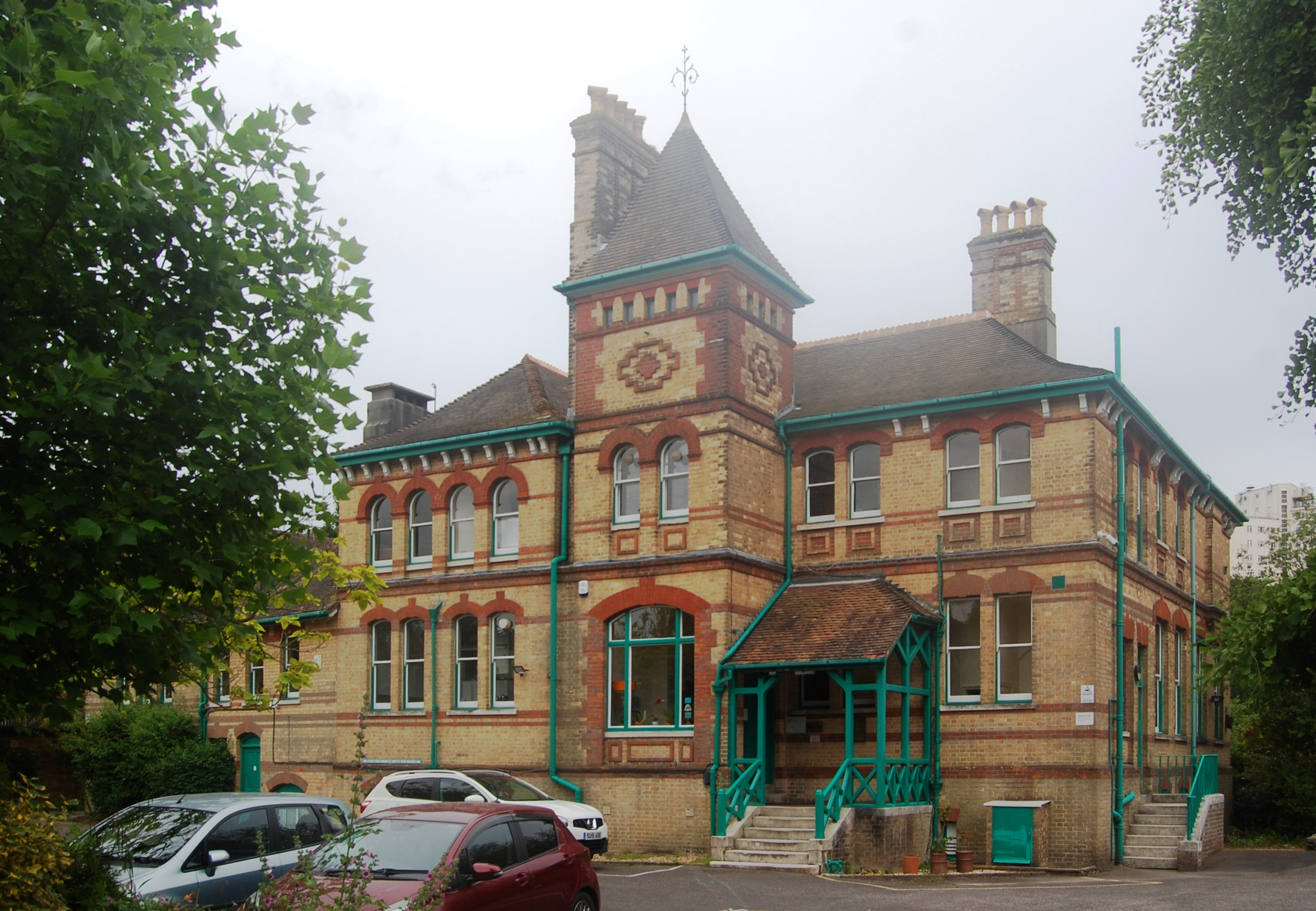
- Bournemouth Natural Science Society in 2022
- Interactive map of the Bournemouth Natural Science Society area

General information
- Architectural style: Victorian
- Location: 39 Christchurch Road, Bournemouth, United Kingdom
- Year built: circa 1865

Website
- bnss.org.uk

Bournemouth Natural Science Society is a historic museum in Bournemouth, Dorset, England.

== History ==
The building was constructed circa 1865. The museum holds collections covering Natural History, Geology, Egyptology and Archaeology. In 2019, a project began to restore a lantern roof light.

== See also ==
- List of museums in Dorset
