= Dinosaurland Fossil Museum =

Fossil museum in Dorset, England

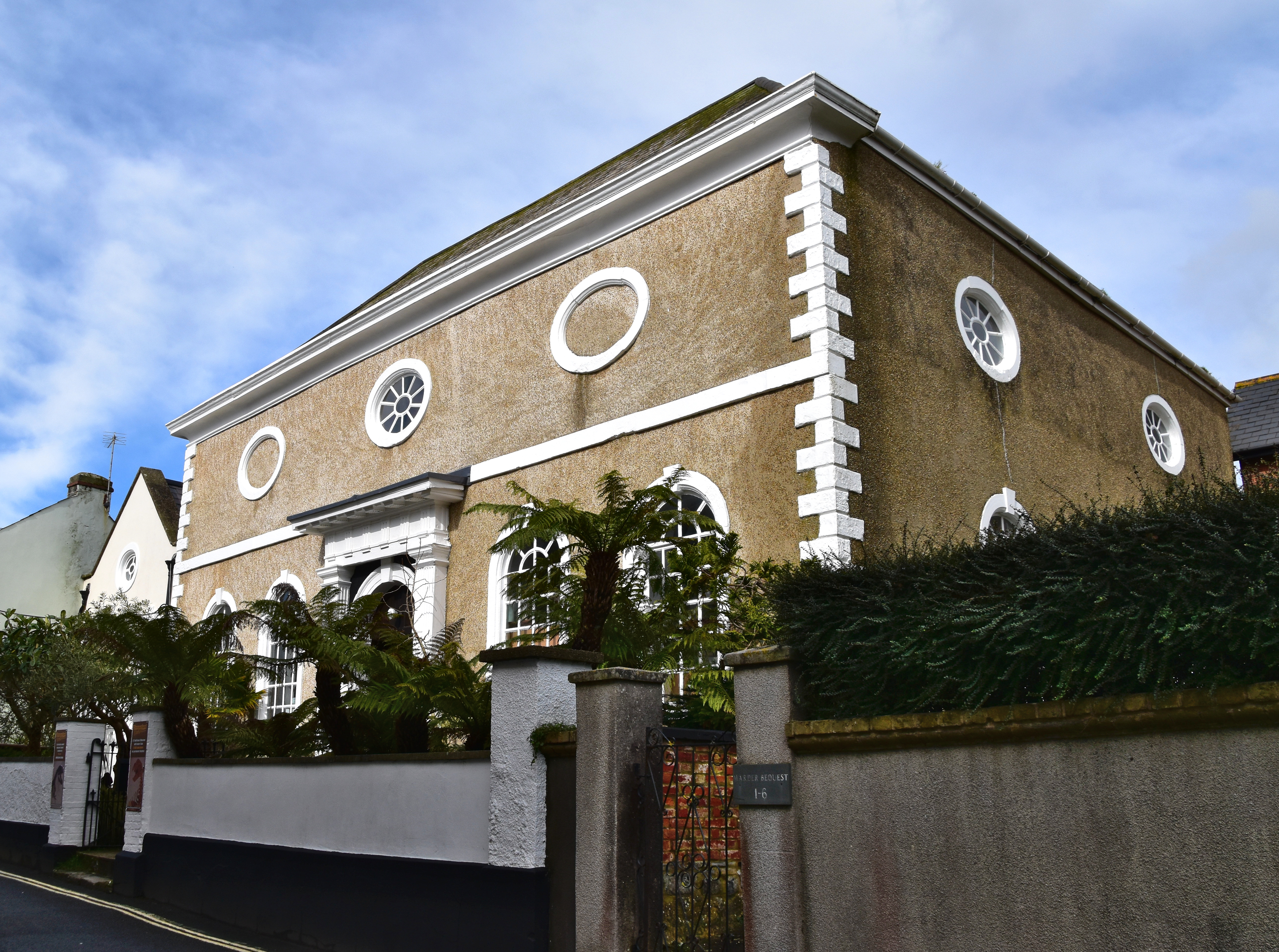

- Location within Dorset
- 50°43′33″N 2°56′02″W
- Location: Lyme Regis, Dorset

History
- Built: 1750-1755

Site notes
- Architect: John Whitty

Listed Building – Grade I
- Official name: Congregational Church
- Designated: 31 January 1974
- Reference no.: 1278935

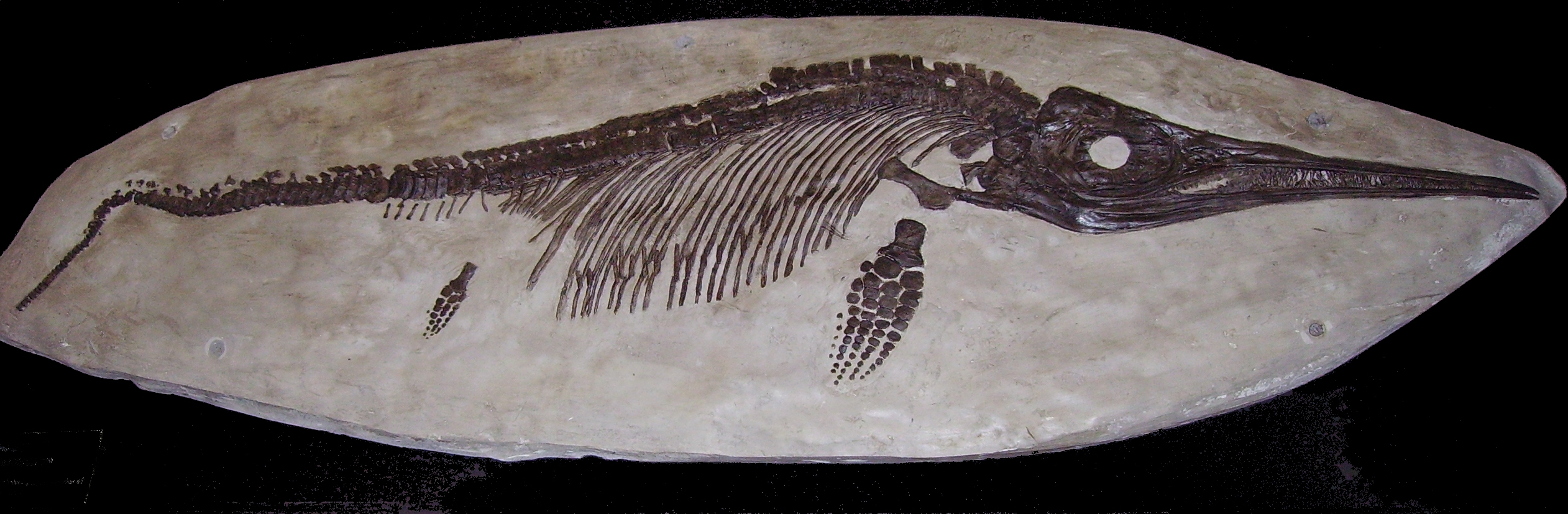
Ichthyosaurus fossil exhibit

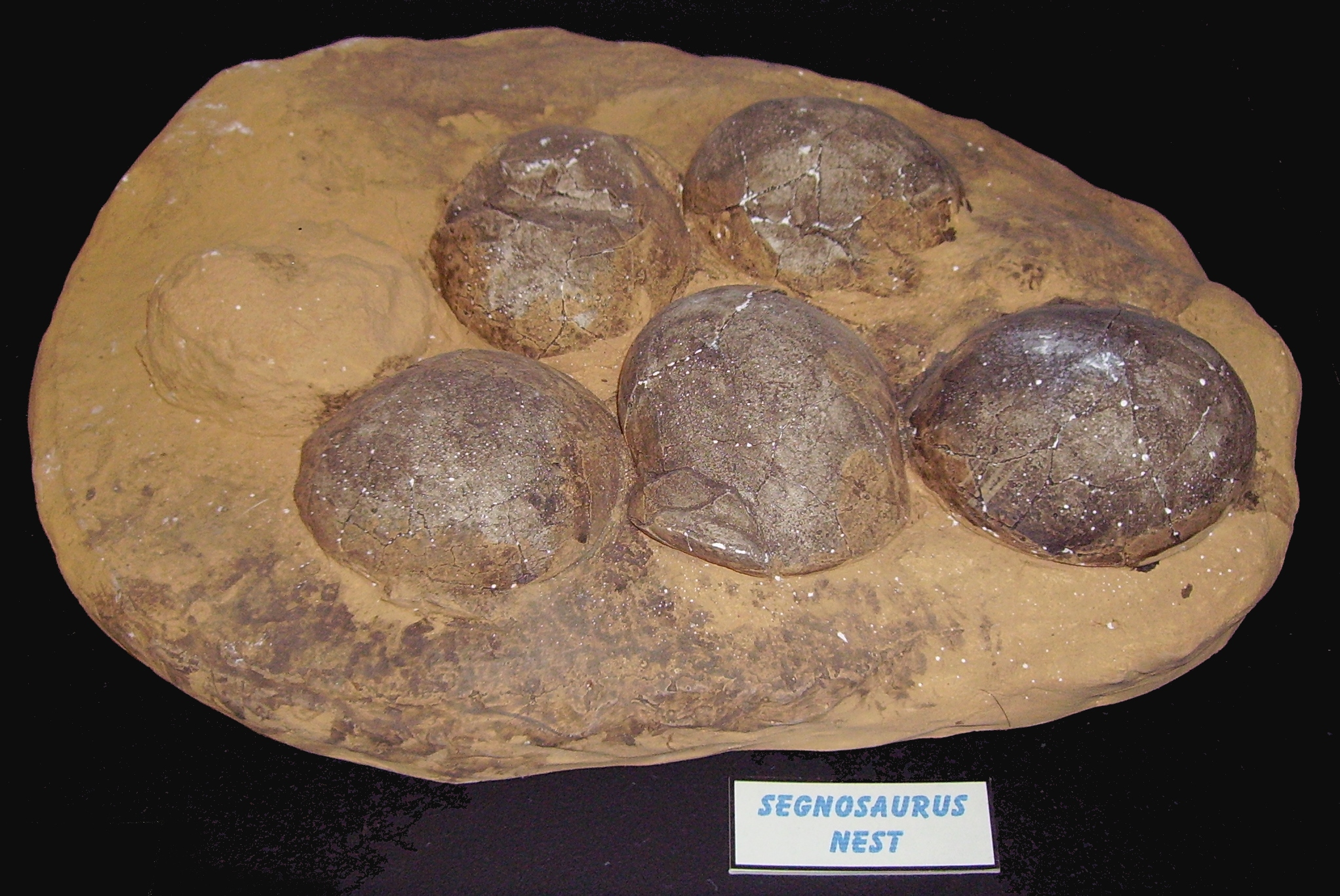
Exhibit of Segnosaurus nest with eggs

Dinosaurland Fossil Museum (a.k.a. Dinosaurland) is a privately owned fossil museum in Lyme Regis, on the Jurassic Coast in Dorset, England. The museum is located in a historic Grade I listed former congregational church building.

== Museum ==
The museum, opened in 1989, is owned and run by Steve Davies, a former chief palaeontologist for BP. It contains a collection of local marine fossils from the Jurassic period. The museum organizes guided fossil hunting walks. There is a museum shop that sells fossils and minerals.

The fossil collection is housed on the ground floor. As well as local Jurassic fossils, there are dinosaurs from China. There are also modern shells and skeletons on display. The museum has a small collection of dinosaur fossils on show (such as a large dinosaur coprolite, a Megalosaurus skeleton and a Chinese dinosaur, of unknown genus).

== Congregational Church ==
The museum is located on Coombe Street in a 250-year-old Grade I listed building that used to be a congregational church. The church was built between 1750 and 1755 by John Whitty. It was where Mary Anning (1799–1847), an early fossil hunter, was baptised and later attended for worship.

The two storey building has a hipped roof and rusticated quoins. The round-headed doorway has Doric pilasters on either side. There is a 19th-century addition to the left hand end of the building.

== See also ==
- Lyme Regis Museum
- Charmouth Heritage Coast Centre
- The Dinosaur Museum in Dorchester, Dorset
- Jurassica, Isle of Portland
- Dinosaur Isle, Sandown, Isle of Wight
- Portland Museum
