= Dinosaur Walk Museum =

Dinosaur Walk Museum was a series of attractions that feature life-size sculptures of dinosaurs and replicas of fossils. Branches of the museum were located in Riverhead, New York and Pigeon Forge, Tennessee.

The location in Branson, Missouri closed and relocated, and is now known as Branson Dinosaur Museum.

== History ==
The original Dinosaur Walk Museum first opened its doors to the public on June 24, 2004, and was located in Riverhead, New York, on Long Island. Designed and created by the artist Fred Hoppe, the museum featured one of the world's largest collections of prehistoric animals. This museum was shut down in July 2008.

The Pigeon Forge location was reportedly closed in 2011.

== Exhibits ==
All of the exhibits, which represent 47 species, have been recreated life-size and are based upon actual fossil records.

Some of the exhibits include: Tyrannosaurus rex, Platecarpus, Parasaurolophus, Daspletosaurus, Deinonychus, Coelophysis, Velociraptor, Troodon, Plesiosaurs, Oviraptor, large and small flying reptiles and the skulls, bones, and skeletons of prehistoric mammals, fossils and other items of interest. Hand painted murals surround the 17,000-square-foot (1,600 m^{2}), two-level museum. The museum also features two high-definition movie theaters with continuous educational dinosaur movies, hands-on activities for children, and a gift shop.

Some of the dinosaurs found at the Dinosaur Walk Museum are:

T-Rex: The Tyrannosaurus rex was known to have lived during the late Cretaceous Period, 66 million years ago. It grew to be over 43 feet (13 m) in length, over 15 feet (4.6 m) tall and weighed up to 7.5 tons.

Platecarpus: The Platecarpus is an extinct aquatic lizard, part of the Mosasaur family. It grew to be up to 14 feet (4.3 m) long and ate mainly fish, squid and ammonites.

Parasaurolophus: The Parasaurolophus, like the T-Rex, lived during the Cretaceous Period 76-66 million years ago. It grew to be 33 feet (10 m) long, 16 feet (4.9 m) high, and weighed almost 7,700 pounds. The Parasauolophus was an herbivore. The large crest was thought to be used for communication amongst males and females.

Daspletosaurus: The Daspletosaurus was known to have lived during the Upper Cretaceous Period and found in what is now North America. Thought to be a possible ancestor of the T-Rex. It grew to over 28 feet (8.5 m) in length and weighed almost four tons, and was primarily a carnivore.

Deinonychus: The Deinonychus grew to be almost 10 feet (3.0 m) long and weighed up to 175 pounds, living during the early cretaceous period. Deinonychus, like many raptors, had a sickle claw used primarily for attacking its prey.

Coelophysis: Living during the late Triassic Period almost 210 million years ago. It grew to be between 2–3 meters in length and less than a meter tall at the hips. Coelophysis had an unusual formation in the vertebrae, forming an "S" like shape in its neck. It is the "official dinosaur" of New York State.

Velociraptor: Living during the late Cretaceous Period, 83-70 million years ago. The Velociraptor, a carnivore, grew to be up to 5.9 feet (1.8 m) in length and could grow up to 45 pounds. The Velociraptors had on their feet long curved claws used for attacking their prey. They had a bone structure similar to many modern day birds.

Troodon: The Troodon, a very small bird-like dinosaur, grew to be up to 6.5 feet (2.0 m) in length, 3 feet (0.91 m) tall and only weighed up to 130 pounds. Living during the late Cretaceous Period, 75–66 million years ago. Originally thought to be carnivorous, modern evidence shows that it is possible that they were omnivorous or possibly an herbivore.

Plesiosaurs: The Plesiosaurs were carnivorous aquatic reptiles. First appearing at the beginning of the Jurassic Period they thrived throughout the Cretaceous Period. They lived during the same time as the dinosaurs but were not dinosaurs, they are considered reptiles.

Oviraptor: The Oviraptor, or "Egg Thief", lived during the late Cretaceous Period between 80 and 70 million years ago. Early evidence shows that the Oviraptor was attempting to steal Protoceratops eggs. When the dig was discovered the Ovirapotor was huddled over a nest of what turned out to be Oviraptor eggs. Although the name means egg thief they are now considered to be egg protectors.
