= Dinosaur Museum (Dorchester) =

Museum in Dorset, England

Coordinates: 50°42′54″N 2°26′03″W

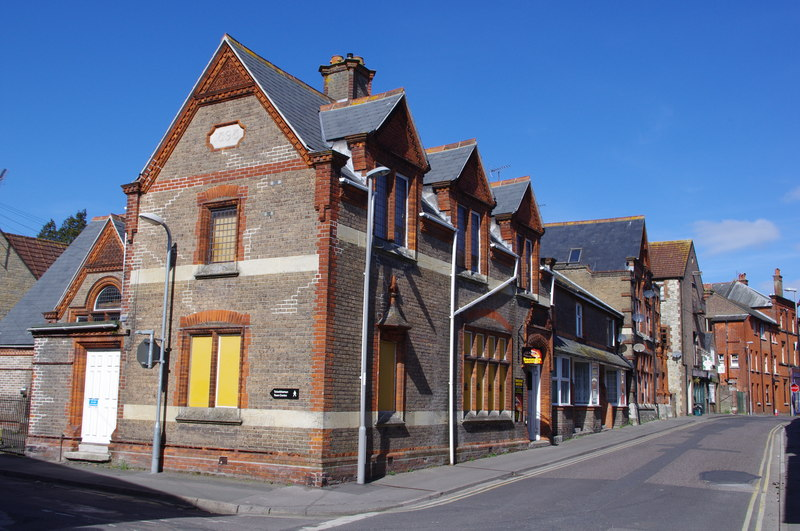
The Dinosaur Museum

The Dinosaur Museum is a museum presenting dinosaurs in Dorchester, the county town of Dorset, in southern England.

The Dinosaur Museum is the only museum in mainland Britain dedicated purely to dinosaurs. The museum is not far from the Jurassic Coast to the south, a World Heritage Site. The museum is based in Icen Way in central Dorchester. It features an outdoor model of a triceratops that was renovated in 2012. At Easter, the museum features a dinosaur Easter egg hunt.

== See also ==
- Charmouth Heritage Coast Centre
- Dinosaurland Fossil Museum
- Lyme Regis Museum
- Jurassica
- Portland Museum
