= Museum of Dinosaurs and Ancient Cultures =

- Location within Florida
- Established: 2017
- Location: 250 West Cocoa Beach Causeway; Cocoa Beach, Florida
- Coordinates: 28.357413°N 80.609983°W
- Type: Natural history and human history
- Curator: Steve Cayer
- Website: Official site

The Museum of Dinosaurs and Ancient Cultures is located at 250 West Cocoa Beach Causeway, Cocoa Beach, Florida. The 26,000 square-foot privately owned museum contains two floors of exhibits on dinosaurs and ancient human cultures.

The museum was estimated to cost approximately $3.7 million to create and opened to the public in 2017. It took 8 years to develop and had an estimated $3 million in artifacts at the time of opening. Steve and Donna Cayer founded the museum.

The museum is not for profit and kept running on all-day admission tickets. The facility is open all days except Tuesday. The museum was under construction in 2013 with a projected draw of 93,000 visitors per year.

== Exhibition ==
The larger, "Hall of Dinosaurs" floor is divided by period, the two larger halls belonging to the Jurassic and Cretaceous, with the Triassic hall between them. Alongside the Triassic hall there are also displays for the Permian period, prehistoric oceans, modern birds, feathered dinosaurs, and mineral and gemstone cavern. The Jurassic hall includes over sixteen genera of dinosaurs and other animals from the time period, as well as a section devoted to plate tectonics, earthquakes, and volcanoes. The Cretaceous hall includes over nineteen genera of dinosaurs from the time period and a small Cenozoic area covering human evolution with dioramas, skeletons, and paleolithic tools. Notable inclusions include a full size Parasaurolophus, an attack scene with two Allosaurus ganging up on a Diplodocus represented in full size skeletons, and a forty-six foot long Giganotosaurus skeletal reconstruction.

The second floor's "Ancient Cultures" floor is separated by region with displays for Central Africa and New Guinea, followed by larger sections for ancient Egypt, Mesoamerica, and China which include duplications of King Tutankhamun's tomb, Terracotta Army soldiers, and Chichen Itza's temple of warriors, alongside dozens of authentic artifacts and taxidermy animals in display cases from both the indicated regions and neighboring areas up to 6,500 years before present.
