= St Johns' House, Sherborne =

Historic building in Dorset, England

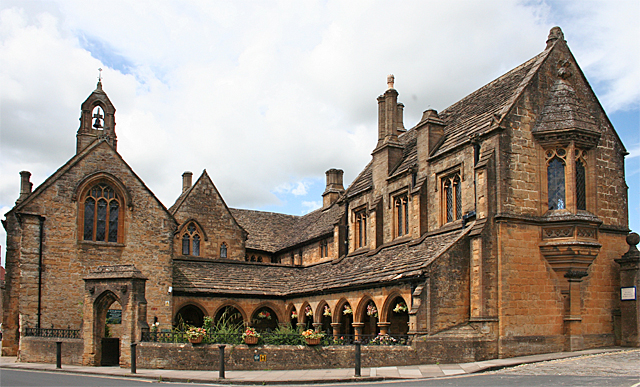

- Location within Dorset
- 50.9459°N 2.5171°W
- Type: Almshouse
- Location: Sherborne, Dorset

History
- Built: 1438

Site notes
- Architectural style: Vernacular
- Governing body: Brethren of St Johns' House

Listed Building – Grade I
- Official name: Hospital of Saints John the Baptist and John the Evangelist
- Designated: 28 November 1950
- Reference no.: 1110827

St Johns' House is an almshouse in Sherborne, Dorset, England. Dating from the mid-15th century, it is a Grade I listed building.

== History ==
The almshouse at Sherborne was established in 1438 with construction taking ten years. It was designed to accommodate 12 poor men and four poor women. The occupants slept in sex-segregated dormitories, the two-storey design of these being an unusual feature of the building. (Note: Communal life at St Johns' was not invariably harmonious; after receiving a fine for misbehaviour one 17th century brethren, a Walter Ridout, "spake many undecent speeches and high words .... he sayd Mr. Hele of Clifton had never a hound of a bigger mouth than the Steward Mr. Wright had".) A refectory, chapel and meeting room were also provided. The patron was Robert Neville, Bishop of Salisbury. In 1866, receipt of a substantial donation enabled considerable expansion of the house.

In the 21st century, St Johns' faced increasing viability challenges, exacerbated by the impact of the COVID-19 pandemic. The communal style of living at the house made it difficult to attract tenants and the maintenance costs related to a Grade I listed building had greatly increased. The trustees' response saw some residents being asked to relocate and some staff being made redundant. In 2024, following a consultation, the trustees announced plans, in conjunction with Sherborne Abbey, for the remodelling of the site to provide for up-to-date accommodation for residents. The first new tenants moved into a redeveloped property on the site in 2025.

In 2025, following an evaluation, the trustees determined to sell a triptych held at St Johns' since the English Reformation. The work's central panel depicts the Raising of Lazarus. An analysis suggests it was likely completed c.1480 in Brussels by an unknown Flemish artist given the notname of Master of the Sherborne Almshouse Triptych. The proceeds from the sale, estimated to be about £2.5-£3.5M, are to be applied to fund further development at St Johns'.

On 3 December 2025, the triptych was sold at Sotheby's for £5.2M after commission.

== Architecture and description ==
St Johns' House was originally built to an L-plan, with the large eastern range and cloister being added in the mid-19th century reconstruction. The south range was also altered at this time. The architect was William Slater, a noted practitioner of church restorations. In the Dorset volume of the Buildings of England series, revised and reissued in 2018, it is described as "delightfully picturesque".

St Johns' House is a Grade I listed building.

== Gallery ==
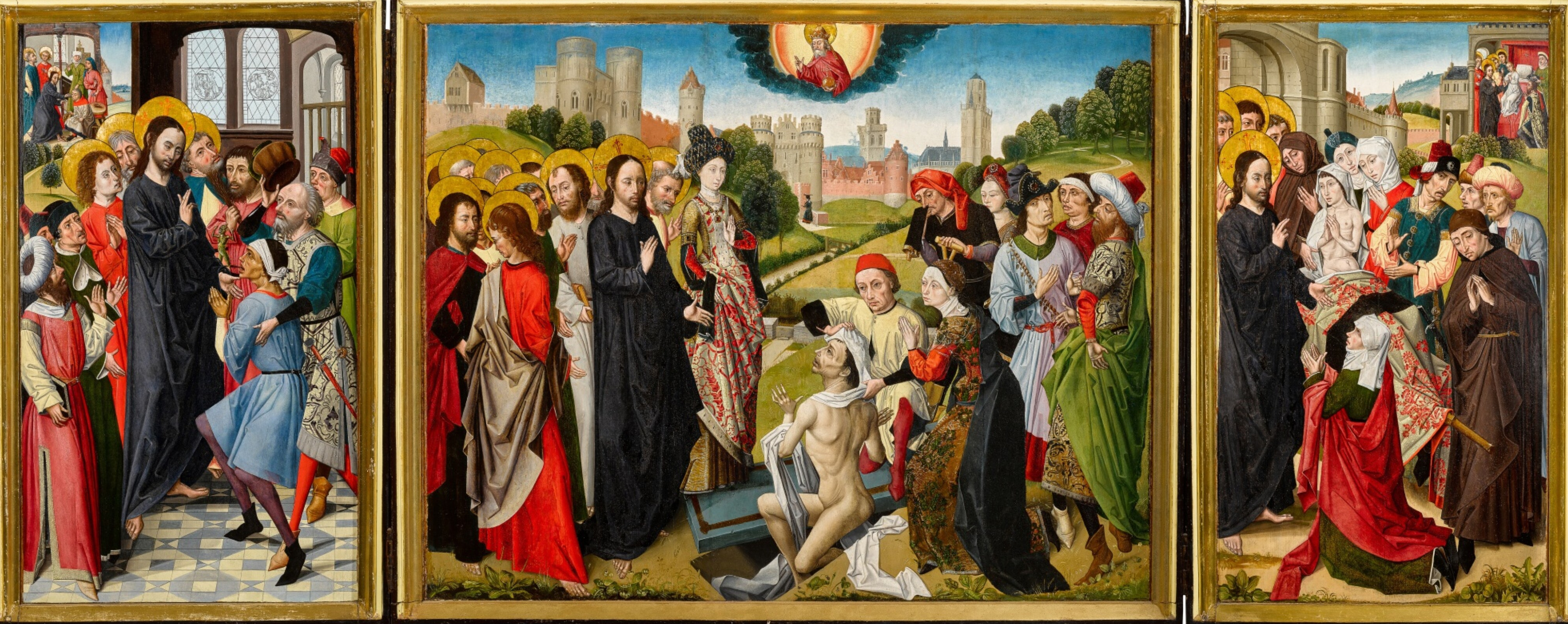
The Sherborne Almshouse Triptych
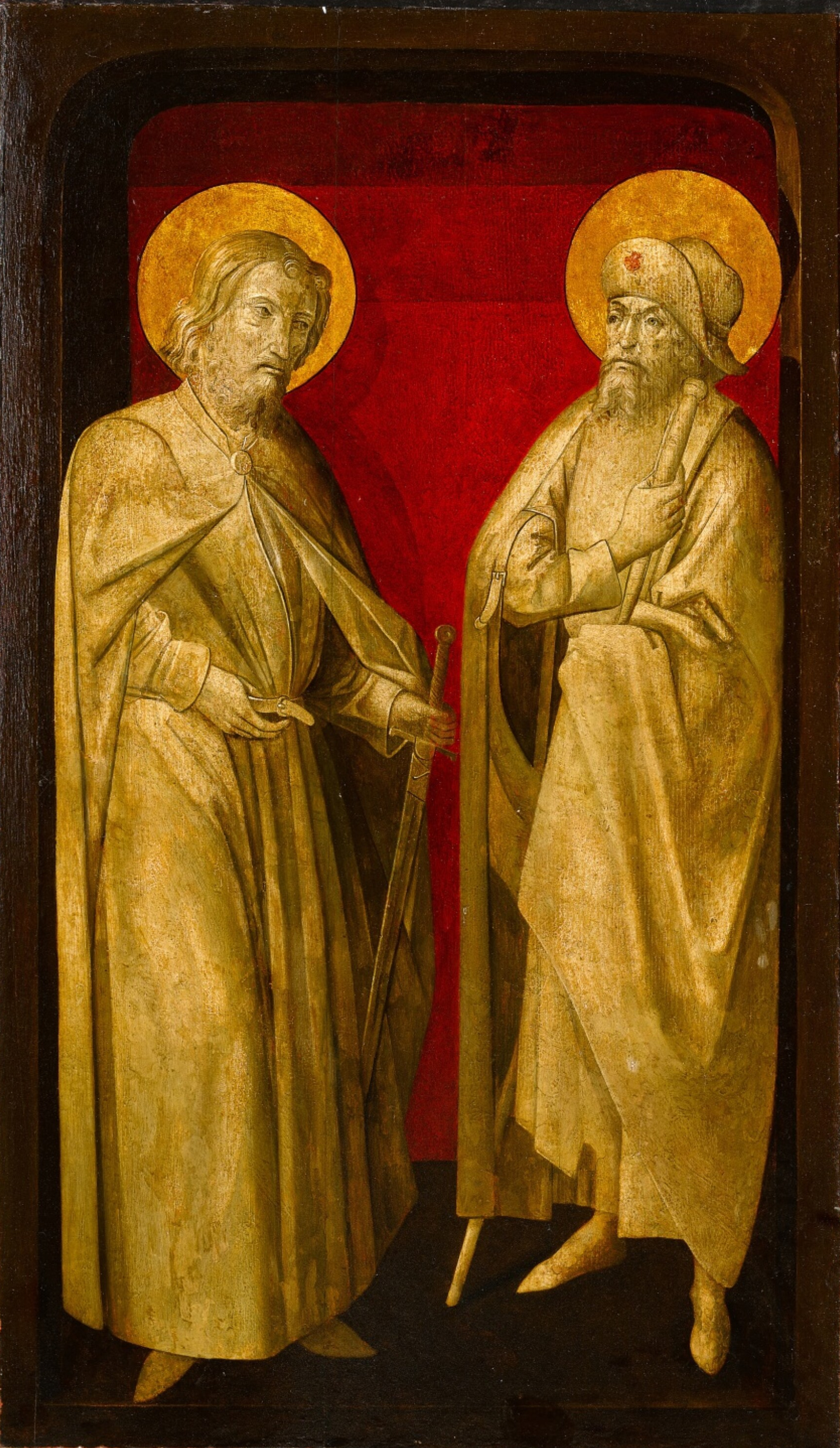
Saints Paul and James (The Master of the Sherborne Almshouse Triptych outer left panel)

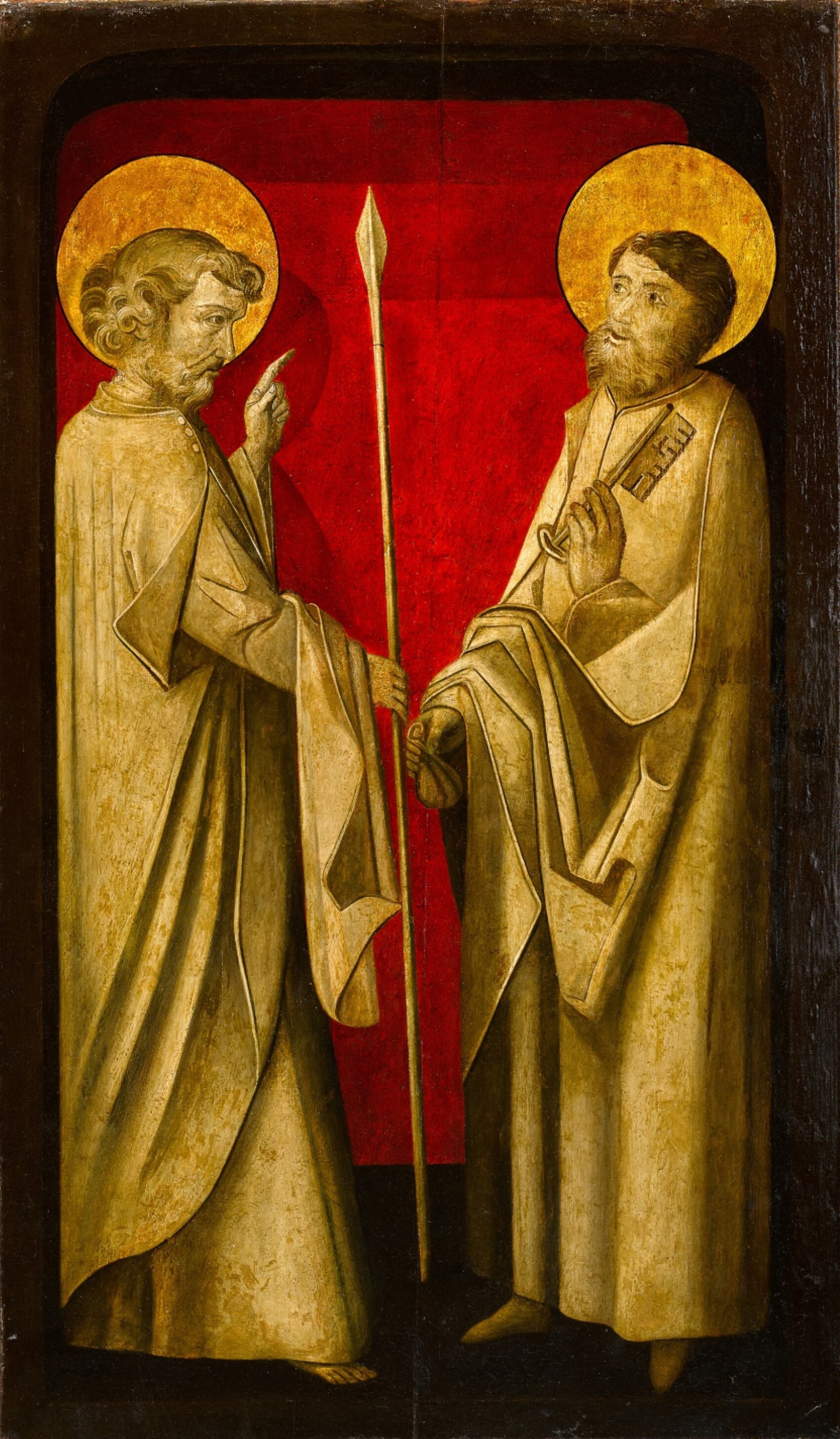
Saints Thomas and Peter (The Master of the Sherborne Almshouse Triptych outer right panel)

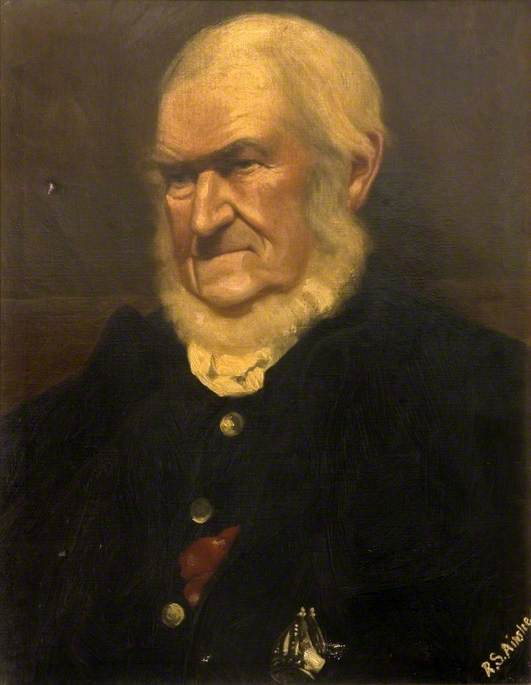
Portrait of Ralph St John Ainslie, a college servant

== Sources ==
- Gourlay, A. B. (1967). A Short Guide to the Almshouse of SS. John, Sherborne (PDF). Sherborne: The Brethren of St Johns'. OCLC 80798253.
- Hill, Michael; Newman, John; Pevsner, Nikolaus (2018). Dorset. The Buildings of England. New Haven, US and London: Yale University Press. ISBN 978-0-300-22478-8.
