= Makoshika Dinosaur Museum =

Coordinates: 47°06′16″N 104°42′50″W

The Makoshika Dinosaur Museum was a private, non-profit regional museum located in Glendive, eastern Montana, United States. It opened in 2004, and before its closure, attracted between 1,500 and 2,000 visitors each summer. It was housed in a building dating from the 1900s and presented dinosaur casts/sculptures and fossils from around the world. It has since been reported closed.

Before its closure, the Makoshika Dinosaur Museum was a part of the Montana Dinosaur Trail.
