= Goseong Dinosaur Museum =

Museum in South Gyeongsang Province, South Korea

Coordinates: 34.9081°N 128.1485°E

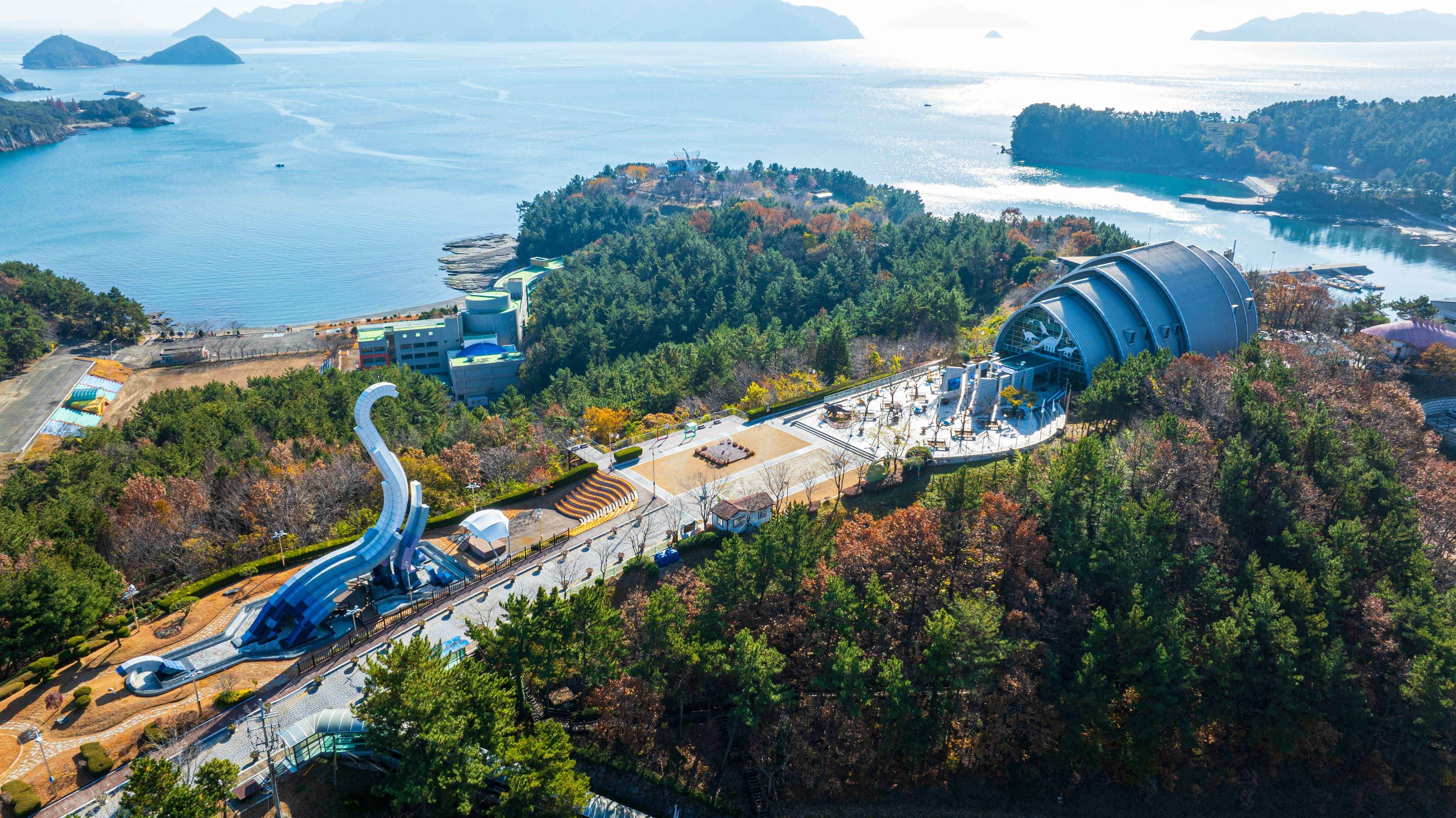
- Established: 2004
- Type: Paleontology

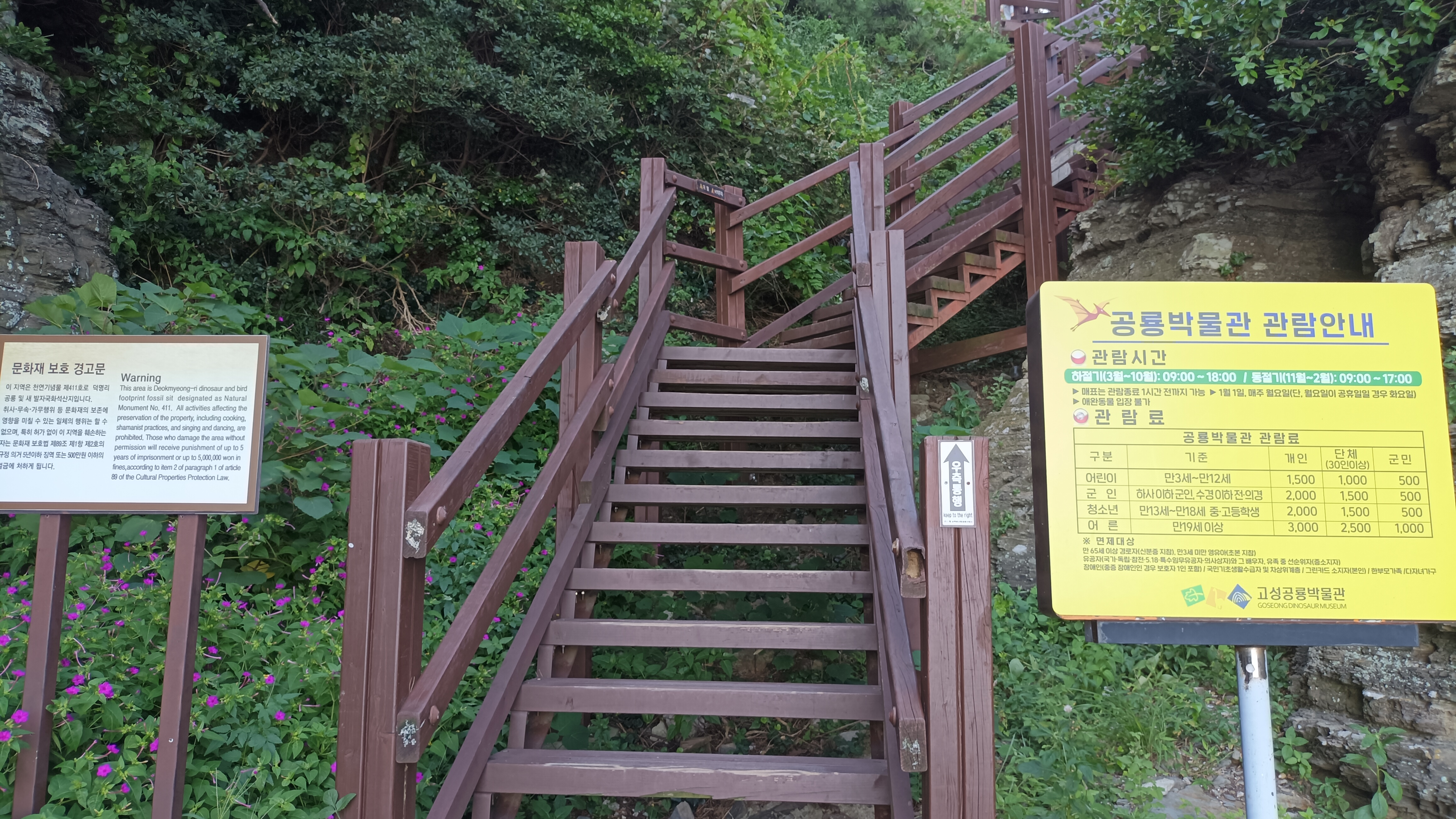
An entrance to the museum

The Goseong Dinosaur Museum is in South Korea. The museum presents dinosaur footprint fossils.

== History ==
Its construction was planned near one of the extensive dinosaur footprint fossil sites globally, and it welcomed its first visitors on November 9, 2004.

Goseong County is widely recognized as one of the world's primary dinosaur footprint sites, featuring roughly 5,000 individual tracks distributed across the area. To safeguard these prehistoric resources and foster public awareness of environmental heritage, the local government initiated plans for a specialized facility. The museum officially opened its doors on November 9, 2004, situated within the scenic bounds of Sangjogam County Park in Hai-myeon.

Architecturally, the main building takes the physical form of an Iguanodon, reflecting one of the region's most prominent dinosaur species. Dominating the exterior space near the entrance is a 24-meter-tall landmark tower constructed from steel trusses and mosaic tiles, artistic ally designed to represent a Brachiosaurus.

== Visitor Information ==
The museum is open from 9:00 AM to 6:00 PM during peak season (March–October) and 9:00 AM to 5:00 PM during off-season (November–February); ticket sales end one hour before closing. It is closed on Mondays (except when a public holiday falls on a Monday), as well as on New Year's Day and during the Lunar New Year and Chuseok holidays. Admission is 3,000 KRW for adults (19–64), 2,000 KRW for teenagers and military personnel, and 1,500 KRW for children (ages 3–12); Goseong County residents, seniors aged 65 and over, and people with disabilities are admitted free of charge. Parking costs 500 KRW for motorcycles, 2,000 KRW for cars, and 3,000 KRW for large vans.

== Museum Overview ==
Located in the heart of the Sangjogam area, the museum serves as a notable tourist destination, featuring prominent dinosaur footprints and picturesque landscapes. With a four-story structure, the museum comprises five exhibition halls and various specialized rooms, including a film room.
