= Charmouth Heritage Coast Centre =

Heritage centre in Dorset, England

Coordinates: 50.7335°N 2.9020°W

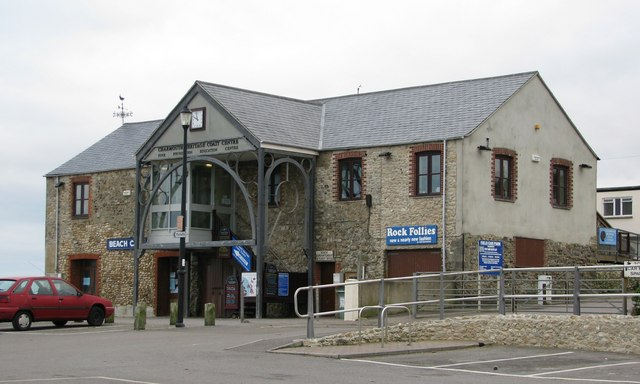
Charmouth Heritage Coast Centre

The Charmouth Heritage Coast Centre is based in the upstairs floor of a long-disused cement factory on the foreshore of Charmouth in Dorset, England.

The centre operates as an independent registered charity within the larger framework of the UNESCO Dorset and East Devon Coast World Heritage Site, known as the "Jurassic Coast". The Jurassic Coast stretches over a distance of 155 kilometres (96 mi), from Orcombe Point near Exmouth, in the west, to Old Harry Rocks, in the east. The coastal exposures along the coastline provide a continuous sequence of Triassic, Jurassic and Cretaceous rock formations spanning approximately 185 million years of the Earth's history. The localities along the Jurassic Coast includes a large range of important fossil zones.

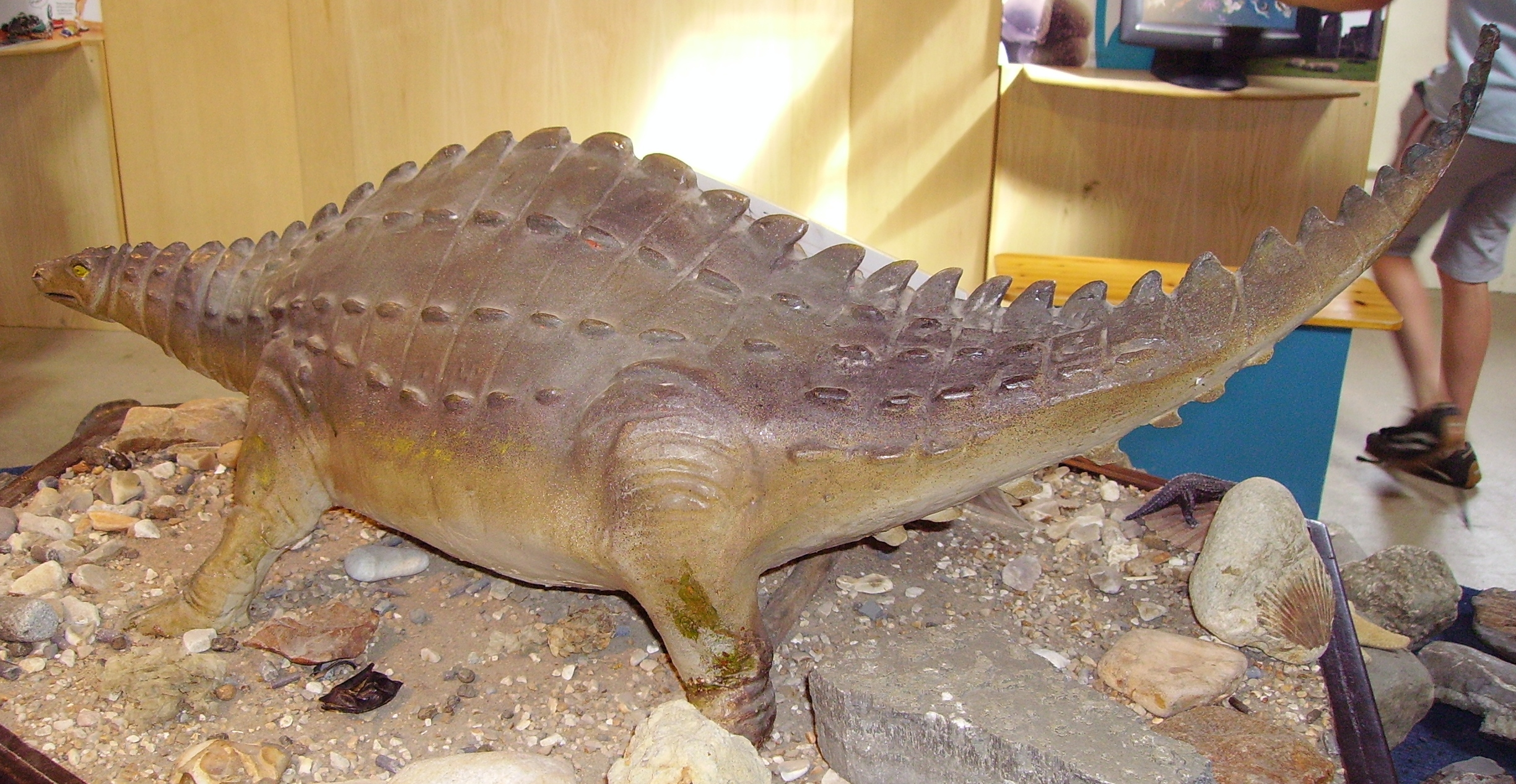
Scelidosaurus reconstruction at the Centre

Entry to the centre and all of its displays is free and, as such, the centre is dependent upon money generated from walks and events as well as charitable donations from the public. It has also received Heritage Lottery Fund grants. The centre was set up in 1985 by local residents, in response to concerns about damage being done to the cliffs by fossil hunters. The role of the centre has always been primarily as an educator and it has undergone several phases of expansion as the demand from the public and from school groups has risen.

In 2014 a grant from the Primary Science Teaching Trust enabled the provision of a classroom and resources designed to help local children achieve the requirements of the National Curriculum.
