= River Jordan, Dorset =

River in Dorset, England

Jordan
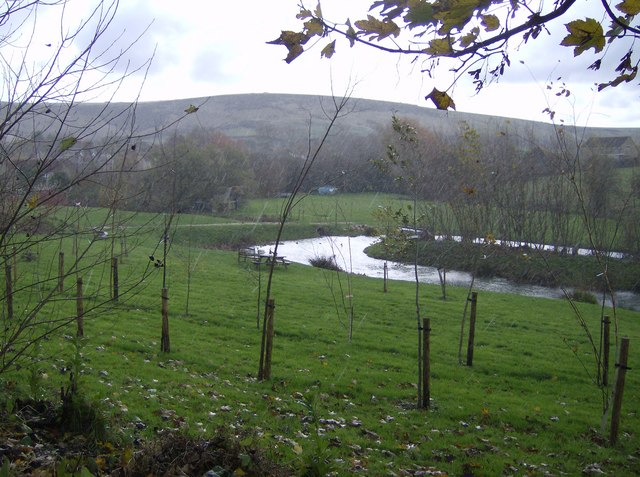
- The River Jordan near Preston

Location
- Country: England
- County: Dorset
- Villages: Sutton Poyntz, Preston

Physical characteristics
- Source: Spring Bottom
  - location: Sutton Poyntz, Dorset, UK
  - coordinates: 50.659471°N 2.415091°W
  - elevation: 45 m (148 ft)
- Mouth: Bowleaze Cove, Weymouth Bay
  - location: Weymouth, Dorset, UK
  - coordinates: 50.636371°N 2.421231°W
  - elevation: 0 m (0 ft)
- Length: 4.7 km (2.9 mi)
- Basin size: 7.9 km^{2} (3.1 sq mi)
- Discharge
  - average: 0.14 m^{3}/s (4.9 cu ft/s)
  - minimum: 0.04 m^{3}/s (1.4 cu ft/s)
  - maximum: 0.56 m^{3}/s (20 cu ft/s)

The River Jordan (archaically known as the River Jordon) is a river in the county of Dorset, England. The river is a chalk stream, approximately 3 miles (4.8 km) long, and includes the tributaries of the Osmington Brook and the Preston River. The River Jordan discharges into the English Channel at Bowleaze Cove, northeast of Weymouth.

== Etymology ==
The river's name is the same derivation as that of the nearby Jordan Hill, most probably from the Old English "cerr dūn" meaning "hill at the bend" (thus "Jordan Hill" is tautological). The former spelling of the name, Jordon, includes the Common Brittonic suffix "-don". A second possible origin is that "Jordan" is derived from "Chur dūn", or "hill on the River Chur". The Place-names of Dorset (1989) references the 16th century spelling "Jordain", and suggests that the river (and hill) are either named after the Jo(u)rdan family of Dorset, or simply after the River Jordan in the Middle East. The river is sometimes referred to as the Preston River, after one of the river's two tributaries.

== Course ==
The river is fed by two streams rising in the Dorset Downs; the source of the Preston River is Spring Bottom, approximately 0.5 miles (0.80 km) north of Sutton Poyntz. The other stream, known as the Osmington Brook, rises further east near Osmington. This area of the Dorset Downs is part of the Wessex Ridgeway; the springs emerge from the upper chalk of the escarpment.

From its sources, the river flows into Sutton Poyntz where the two streams converge. The northern branch of the river fed two corn mills—Sutton Upper Mill (also known as Sutton Poyntz Mill) and Sutton Mill. Upper Mill—along with Sutton Poyntz as a whole—was the inspiration for the mill and village of Overcombe in Thomas Hardy's The Trumpet-Major. The stream here forms the village duck pond, which was created as the mill race for Sutton Mill.

After the streams' confluence, the river flows south into the village of Preston, where a third corn mill was situated. Downstream of the mill, the river is crossed by Roman Bridge. Although the name suggests the bridge is of Roman origin, it is more likely to have been built after the Norman conquest of England—a hypothesis supported by Charles Warne and Sir Talbot Baker. Continuing south, the river flows to the east of Jordan Hill and bisects the site of Preston Roman Villa—although at the time of the construction of the Romano-British building, the river's course was different. The river discharges into Bowleaze Cove, a small sand and shingle beach on the Jurassic Coast and part of Weymouth Bay.

An agreement was made in the 19th century involving the Weymouth Waterworks Company, wherein the upstream course of the river would be diverted via pipes to accommodate pumping facilities.

=== Crossings ===
==== Osmington Brook ====
Near its source, the Osmington Brook is bridged at Hall's Farm, and is crossed by an inland section of the South West Coast Path. A number of footpaths cross the brook at Northdown Farm, after which it is crossed by Sutton Road in Sutton Poyntz shortly upstream of the confluence with the Preston River.

==== Preston River ====
The first crossing of the Preston River is Mission Hall Lane, which is named after the 19th-century mission hall owned by Salisbury Diocese. Upstream of Sutton Mill, a footbridge crosses the mill race before it is fed under the mill buildings. Downstream of the mill, the river is crossed by Sutton Road and Puddledock Lane, before joining with the Osmington Brook.

== History ==
Evidence exists of Neolithic and Iron Age inhabitation of the land near the river.

A Roman villa was built on the banks of the River Jordan, and was in use until the third or fourth century AD—much like the nearby Jordan Hill Roman Temple.

It is possible that milling used the river as a source of power as early as the 9th century; the earliest written evidence of the village of Sutton (later named Sutton Poyntz after the 13th-century landowners) was a Saxon charter dating from AD891. The Domesday Survey of 1086 showed that milling was well established in the village by the 11th century, with 12 mills being operational.

The river featured in Constable's Weymouth Bay: Bowleaze Cove and Jordon Hill (1816–17); it is likely that the inspiration from the painting originated with Constable's honeymoon to Osmington in 1816. The canvas is displayed in the National Gallery; Constable painted a similar (but larger) version entitled Osmington Shore which was exhibited at the British Institution in 1819.

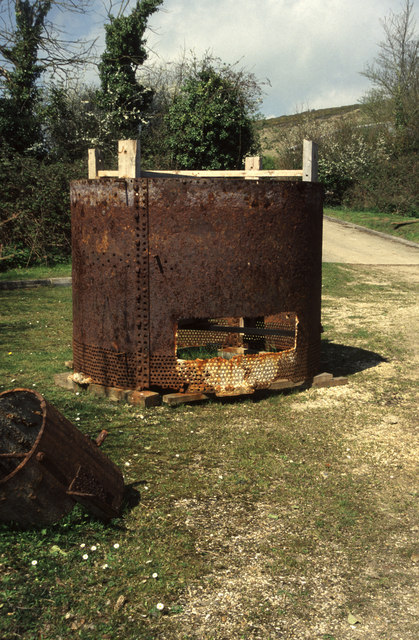
The funnel from the SS Great Eastern after decommissioning from Weymouth Waterworks

The Weymouth Waterworks Company was established in 1797, and in 1856 the company employed Thomas Hawksley to convert Upper Mill on the Jordan in Sutton Poyntz into a pumping station to supply water to Weymouth. Following the fatal explosion of Isambard Kingdom Brunel's SS Great Eastern in 1859, the vessel was towed to the Isle of Portland and Weymouth Waterworks Company purchased the damaged ship's no. 1 funnel, subsequently using it in their filtration system. The funnel was decommissioned in 2004, and Wessex Water donated it to the SS Great Britain Trust in Bristol.

=== Flooding ===
The latter half of the 20th century saw extensive flooding of the river at Sutton Poyntz and Preston. Floods occurred in 1955, 1977, 1979, 1983, 1993 and 2003, and the Environment Agency established the River Jordan Flood Alleviation Scheme to investigate methods of flood prevention. At this time, the agency designated the river as a Critical Ordinary Watercourse (COW). Studies concluded that flooding was caused by silting of the river near Preston Mill, the constriction of flow through bridge arches, and obstructions of culverts. It is likely that heavy rainfall exacerbates the flooding, particularly through increased discharge of the Preston Brook.
