= Overcombe =

Coordinates: 50°38′N 2°26′W

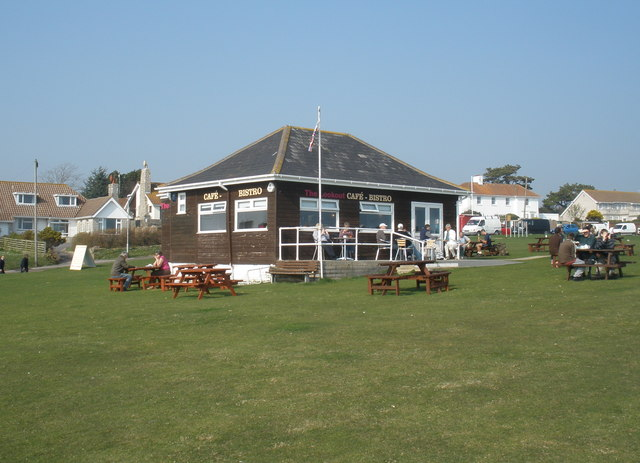
The Lookout Cafe, Overcombe

Overcombe is a coastal area in Preston in south Dorset, England, situated on top of cliffs 2 miles (3.2 km) northeast of Weymouth. The River Jordan flows in the vicinity.

A tollhouse was once situated at the Overcombe corner from Lodmoor, along what was the turnpike road. It was operated by the Shorey family who ran a horse and cart public service. It was demolished in 1959. A block of flats were built in 1965, in place of a cafe. The Spyglass Inn at Overcombe was originally built in the 1930s as a cafe, before becoming the Embassy Hotel and later, the inn. There was once a golf course at Overcombe in the early 20th century. The painter John Constable had his honeymoon at Overcombe.

In the field north of Bowleaze Coveway road is Jordan Hill Roman Temple, which is the remains of a c. 4th century Romano-Celtic temple. In 1928, an important hoard of late 4th century Roman coins was unearthed at Weymouth Bay Estate. In October 2013, 19 swimmers swam in the 5 and a half hour Big Swim from Lulworth Cove to Overcombe Corner, raised £2,560 for the Dorchester Opportunity Group. Overcombe car park, run by the Weymouth and Portland Borough Council, has approximately 180 parking spaces.

== In popular culture ==
Overcombe is the principal location for Thomas Hardy's 1880 novel 'The Trumpet-Major', which was set during the Napoleonic Wars. Overcombe also makes a brief cameo in Hardy's 1886 novel 'The Mayor Of Casterbridge' as one of the places from where came vans of carriers, which travelled in and out of Casterbridge.
