= Greenhill, Dorset =

Suburb of Weymouth, Dorset, England

Coordinates: 50.62064°N 2.44805°W

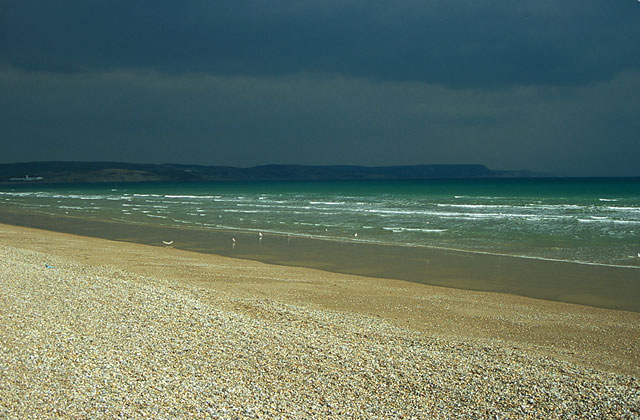
The beach at Greenhill, Weymouth, Dorset.

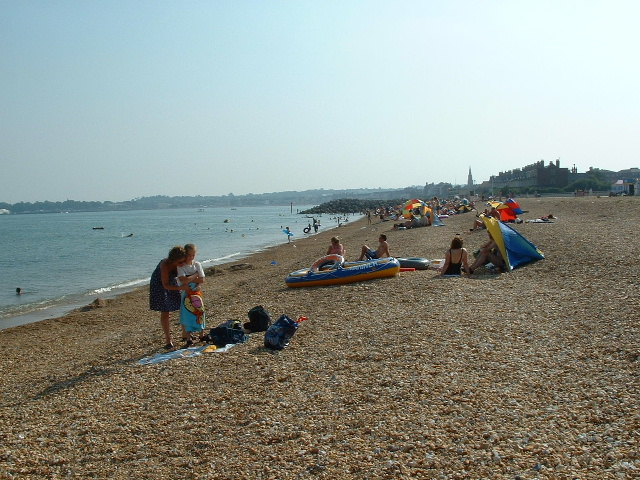
View on the beach looking southwest towards central Weymouth.

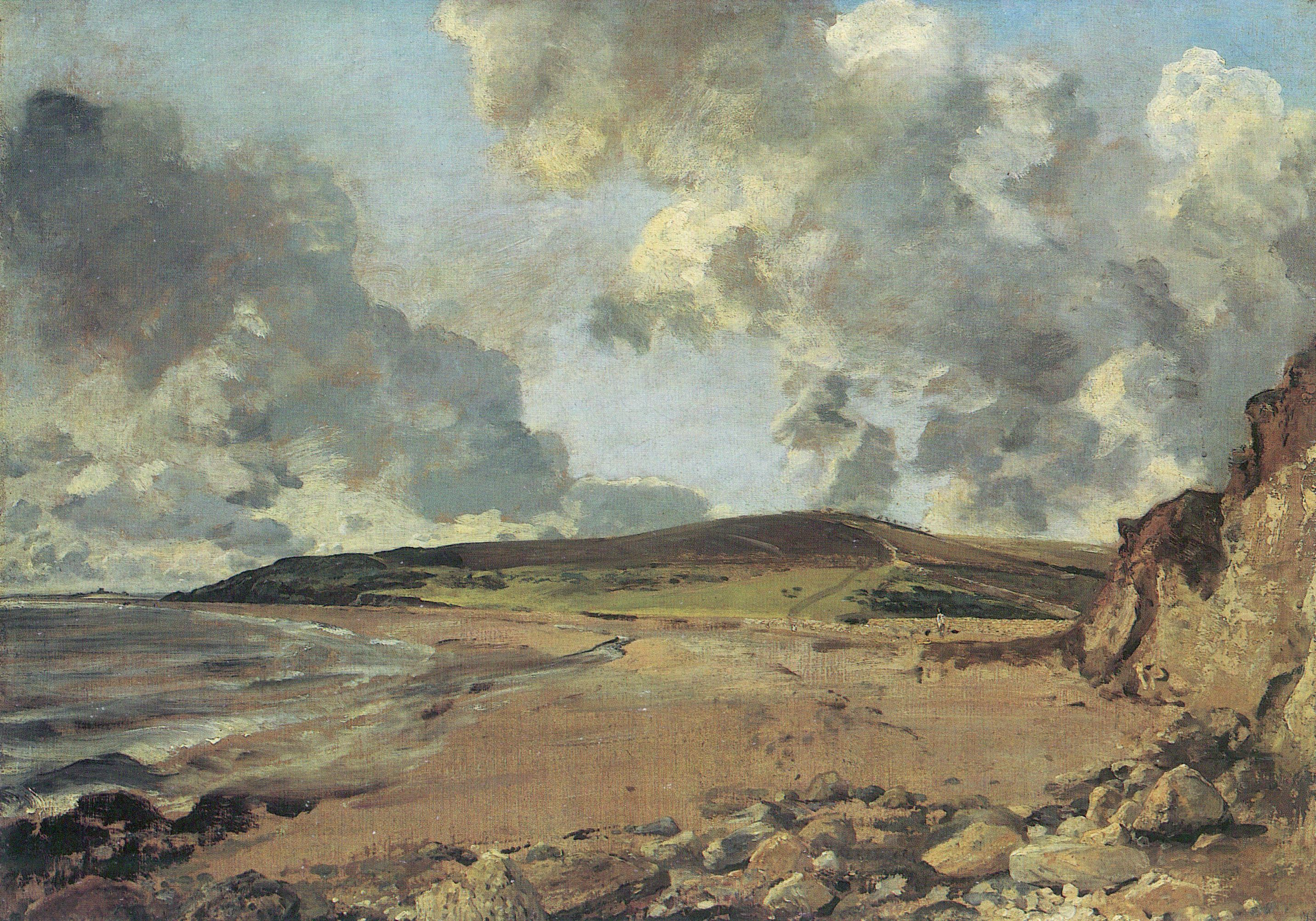
Weymouth Bay: Bowleaze Cove and Jordon Hill, painted by John Constable in 1816–17, including Furzy Cliff and beyond that the beach at Greenhill in the distance.

Greenhill is a suburb to the northeast of Weymouth in Dorset, England, with a sand and shingle beach.

The A353 road, locally known as Greenhill, runs parallel and close to the beach. To the northeast it becomes Preston Road, leading to the village of Preston. Also to the northeast along the coast are Furzy Cliff, Jordan Hill, and Bowleaze Cove. To the southwest is the sandy Weymouth Beach and seaward is Weymouth Bay.

The suburb contains Greenhill Gardens.

== See also ==
- List of Dorset beaches
