= Furzy Cliff =

Geological formation in Dorset, England

Coordinates: 50.6352°N 2.4275°W

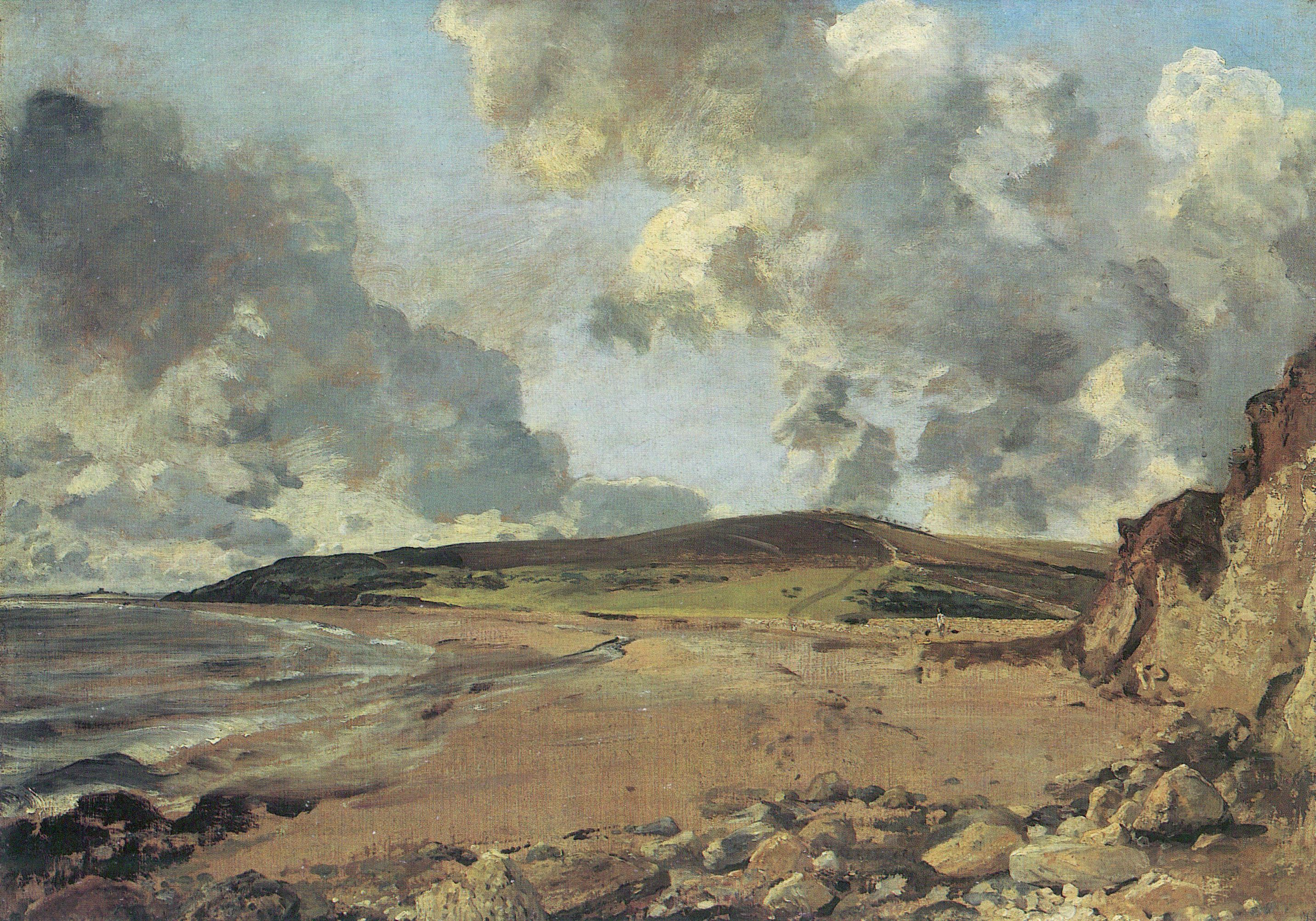
Weymouth Bay: Bowleaze Cove and Jordon Hill, painted by John Constable in 1816–17, including Furzy Cliff.

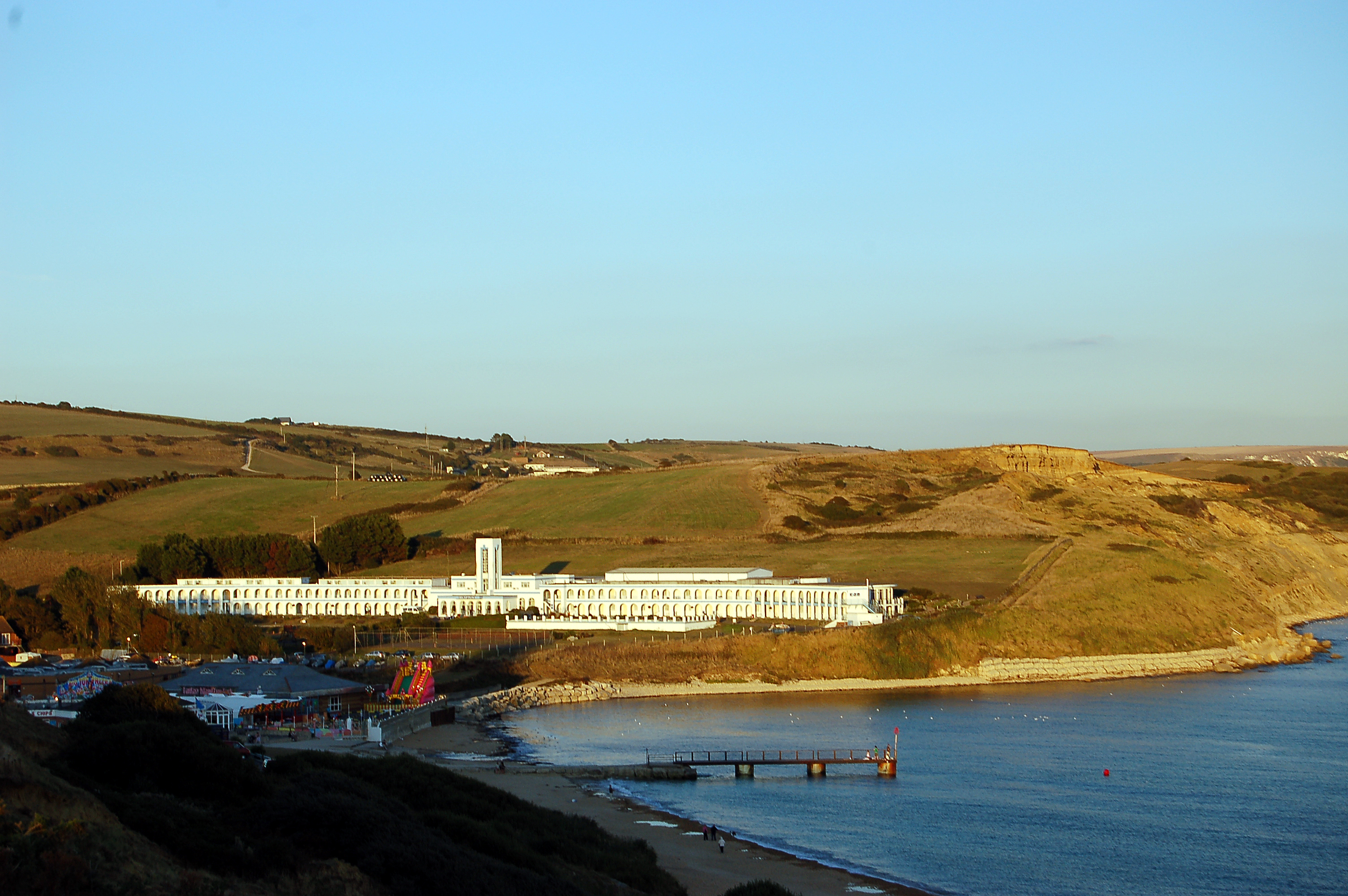
View of Bowleaze Cove from the top of Furzy Cliff.

Furzy Cliff, also known as Jordan's Cliff, is located on the coast near the village of Preston, just to the east of Weymouth in Dorset, England.

== Cliff ==
It is at the north-eastern end of Weymouth Beach, looking out over Weymouth Bay to Portland Harbour and the Isle of Portland. Close by to the east is Bowleaze Cove. Just inland to the north are Jordan Hill and the remains of the Jordan Hill Roman Temple. On the top of the cliff there is a large grass area with good views.

Furzy Cliff consists of Oxford Clay with a thin Corallian limestone layer on top. Mudslides frequently occur on the narrow undercliff and the base is mainly made up of clay material. Fossilized examples of Gryphaea dilatata, commonly called "devil's toenail", an extinct species of Jurassic oyster, and Metriacanthosaurus parkeri, a theropod dinosaur, can be found in the Oxford Clay.

In 1816–17, the artist John Constable painted Weymouth Bay: Bowleaze Cove and Jordon Hill, including Furzy Cliff, while on his honeymoon, viewed from the beach at Bowlease and looking west. The painting is now in the National Gallery, London.

== See also ==
- Greenhill, Dorset
