= Lodmoor =

Park in England

The Lodmoor Events (Lew Mills)
- Site of Special Scientific Interest
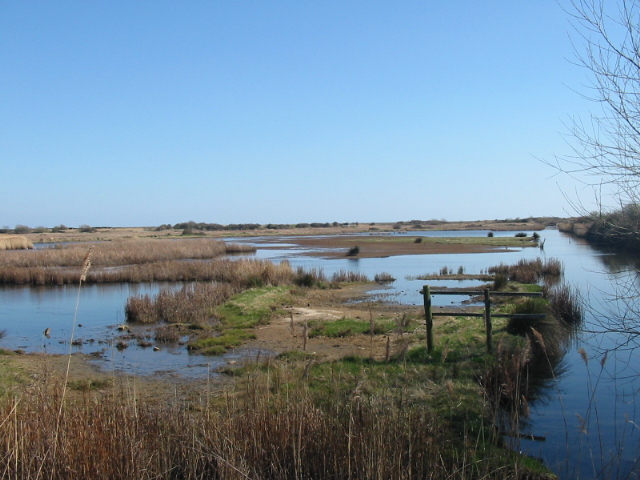
- The nature reserve

- Location within Dorset
- Location of The Lodmoor Events (Lew Mills).
- Area of search: Dorset
- Grid reference: SY688813
- Coordinates: 50.631°N 2.442°W
- Interest: Biological
- Area: 71.5 hectares (0.715 km^{2}; 0.276 sq mi)
- Notification date: 1952

Lodmoor is a Site of Special Scientific Interest (SSSI), RSPB reserve and country park in Dorset, England. The country park features a visitor centre, model railway and pitch and putt golf course. The SSSI has a wetland habitat with native birds that are rare in the UK and a range of migratory species.

== History ==
The construction of a sea wall in the twentieth century has prevented regular tidal incursions, although freshwater flooding is still an occurrence, especially in winter.

== Location ==
Lodmoor is 1.6 kilometres (0.99 mi) east of Weymouth, near the suburb of Preston. The site is accessible via three trails. The SSSI is composed of reed bed, salt marsh, wet grassland and open water, and is separated from Weymouth Bay by Greenhill beach and the B3155 road.

== Site of special scientific interest ==
The site includes a Royal Society for the Protection of Birds nature reserve. Some nationally rare bird species breed there, and it is also visited by some uncommon migratory waders. Part of the area designated as Lodmoor SSSI is owned by the Royal Society for the Protection of Birds.

Birds breeding at Lodmoor include bearded tit, Cetti's warbler, marsh warbler and Savi's warbler. A wide variety of migratory waders visit, including northern lapwing, common snipe, wood sandpiper, green sandpiper, spotted redshank and Eurasian whimbrel. Visitors belonging to uncommon species of wader include jack snipe, greenshank and ruff.

There are also populations of two rare insects, short-winged conehead and lesser marsh grasshopper. The area covered is 71.5 hectares (177 acres).

== Country park ==
The facilities at the country park include a cafe, visitors centre, picnic tables and barbecue stands, a grassed events area for a variety of events including car rallies, summer fayres and circus shows. There is an outdoor gym and a 2 km walking trail, children's play areas, a Sea Life Centre, a mini-golf course, a Model World, a Go-Kart circuit and Bumper Boats, a model railway, 9-Hole pitch and putt golf course and a Parkrun.
