= Pontins =

British chain of campgrounds and holiday resorts

Pontins Holiday Parks

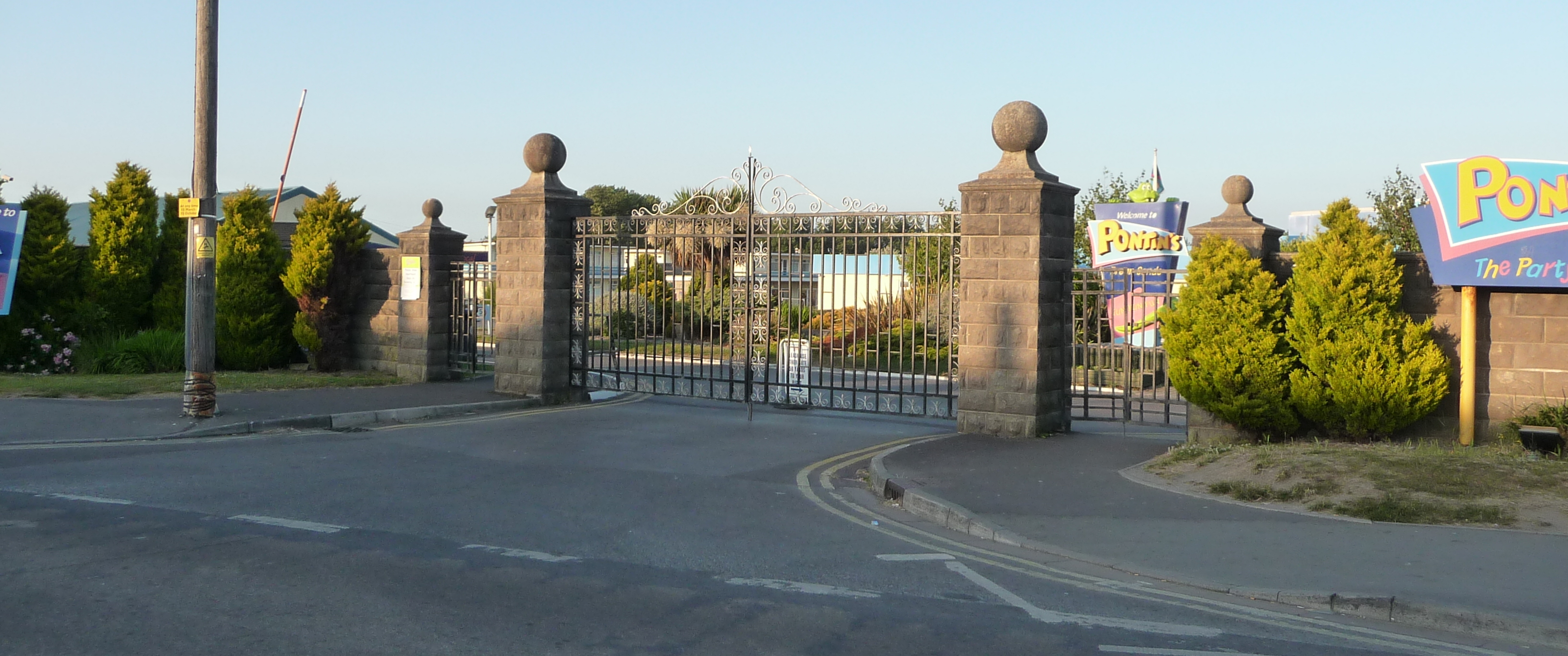
- Entrance to Southport camp, 2010
- Trade name: Pontins
- Type: Private limited company
- Industry: Holiday / Leisure
- Founded: 1946
- Founder: Fred Pontin
- Headquarters: St Helier, Jersey (registered office); Hale, Greater Manchester, England (contact address)
- Number of locations: 1 (2025)
- Area served: United Kingdom
- Products: Family Holiday Parks
- Owner: Britannia Hotels
- Number of employees: 715
- Website: pontins.com

Pontins is a British company operating holiday parks in the United Kingdom, founded in 1946 by Fred Pontin. It was acquired by Britannia Hotels in 2011.

Pontins specialises in offering half-board and self-catering holidays featuring entertainment at resorts, or "holiday parks", as they have branded them. Accommodation is usually in the form of chalets, which Pontins calls "apartments".

In 2022, it was rated the worst British holiday park chain out of a field of 19 in a survey by consumer association Which?

At its peak, Pontins operated over thirty sites although most have since closed. In 2024, three remained: Brean Sands (the last surviving traditional Pontins camp) and two adults-only sites at Sand Bay and Pakefield.

However, as of August 2026, only Sand Bay was open to the public, with Brean Sands and Pakefield both in temporary use as workers' accommodation.

== Company history ==
=== Early years and growth ===
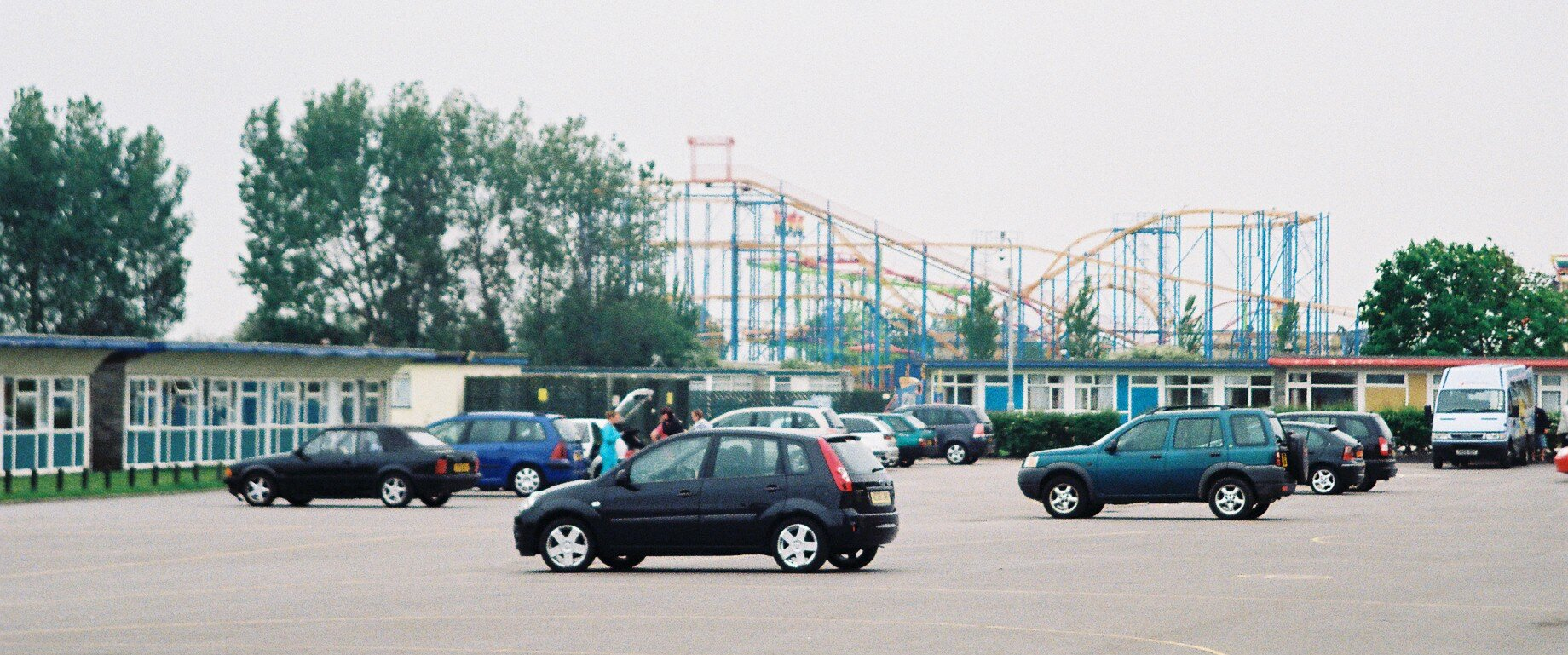
Brean Sands holiday park in 2008

Fred Pontin opened his first holiday camp in 1946 on the site of a former U.S. army base (built during World War II), at Brean Sands near Weston-super-Mare in Somerset at a cost of £23,000. Pontin formed a syndicate, in which he held 50% control, to own the camp. Within a year he had six camps. Over the years, he bought more camps and personally ran them for a year, before selling them to the syndicate. He gradually expanded his empire to thirty sites.

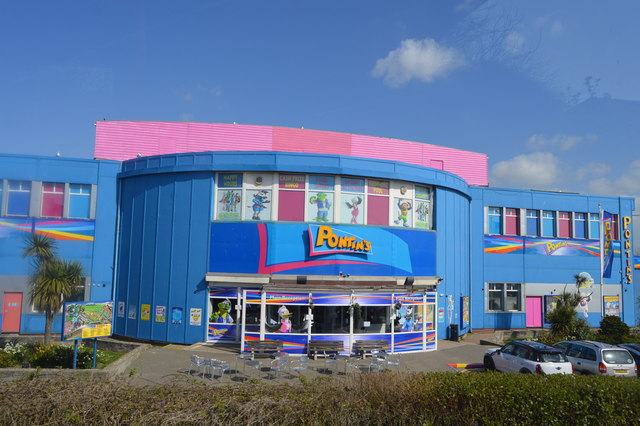
Entrance to Camber Sands camp in 2017, a few years before its closure in 2023

The camps were smaller and less expensive than Butlin's holiday camps. Pontins had Bluecoats to entertain their guests, as opposed to Butlins Redcoats. Among the Bluecoats were Rosie Ramsey, Stu Francis, Shane Richie, Bobby Davro, Bradley Walsh, Nick Wilton, Lee Mack, and Carol Lee Scott (who later played "Grotbags").

=== Sale of company ===
In 1978, the company was sold to Coral for £56 million. In 1980, Coral (including Pontins) was taken over by Bass Brewing, who sold Pontins in 1987 to a management buyout team led by Trevor Hemmings. (Note: Hemmings construction firm had originally built the holiday centre at Southport.) It was sold again in 1989, to Scottish & Newcastle.

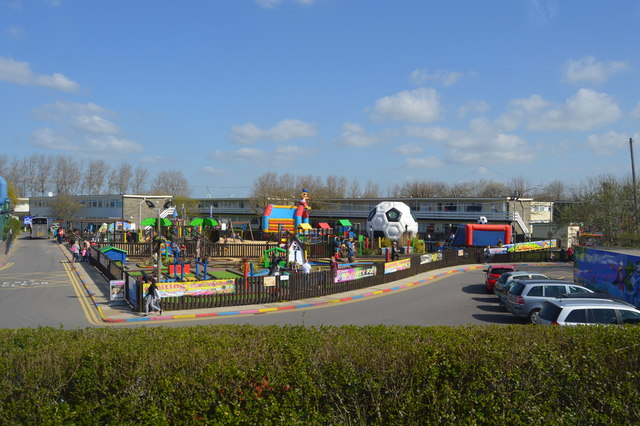
Play equipment at the now-closed Camber Sands camp in 2017

Over the next ten years, the company closed or sold off multiple sites. In a three-year programme in the mid-1990s, the remaining camps were modernised. By the year 2000, the company was operating only eight camps, and was sold back to Hemmings.

=== Early 21st Century ===
In 2008, the company was sold to Ocean Parcs for £46 million. Wall Park holiday centre was not included in the sale.

In January 2009, Pontins announced the closure of its Hemsby holiday centre. Pontins Blackpool in Squires Gate closed in October 2009 and was subsequently demolished after being acquired by property developer Persimmon, leaving only five parks still operating under the Pontins brand.

Pontins headquarters were relocated to the Southport Holiday Park, Ainsdale in Southport. From the original Hemmings buy-out until then, the headquarters were at Sagar House in the village of Eccleston, Lancashire.

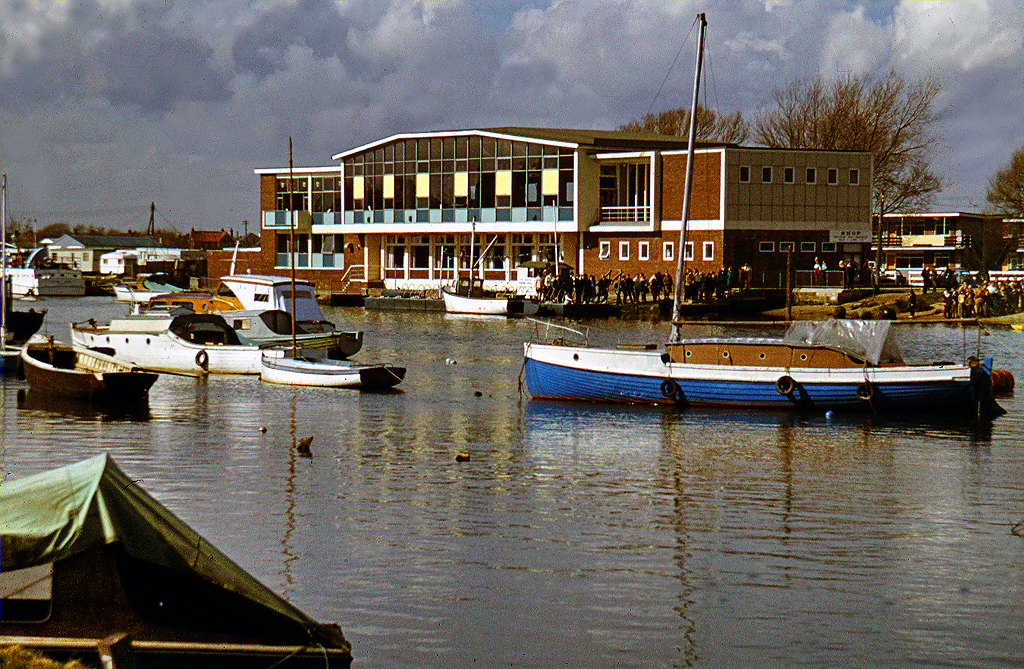
Wick Ferry Pontins camp in 1971

In September 2009, Pontins announced a five-year multi-million investment plan for the remaining five parks. Refurbishment work completed in 2010 included a new half-board restaurant and ice skating rink at the Prestatyn Sands Holiday Park, and a new roller skating rink at the Brean Sands Holiday Park. Proposals of rebuilding the Camber Sands and Southport Holiday Parks and doubling the capacity of the Pakefield Holiday Park were also made.

=== Administration and further closures ===
In November 2010, Pontins entered administrative receivership and in January 2011, the company was bought out of receivership by Britannia Hotels. In 2014, the former Pontins resort at Sand Bay was purchased by the group and it became the sixth resort to be operated under the new Pontins brand.

On 30 November 2023, Britannia Hotels, owners of Pontins, suddenly closed the parks at Prestatyn and Camber Sands with immediate effect, affecting people who had made bookings for the Christmas period. On 3 January 2024, the park at Southport was suddenly closed following flooding in Storm Henk.

=== Recent years ===
Since 2024, Pontins' three surviving resorts have consisted of the family-oriented Brean Sands (the sole remaining traditional family-oriented "Pontins" camp), plus two adults-only holiday villages at Pakefield and Sand Bay.

However, as of August 2026 only Sand Bay is open to the public. Brean Sands and Pakefield remain in temporary use as accommodation for workers involved in the construction of Hinkley Point C and Sizewell C nuclear power stations respectively and no proposed date has been given for reopenings.

== Controversies ==
=== Discrimination against Irish Travellers ===
In March 2021, a whistleblower provided the Equality and Human Rights Commission (EHRC) with an internal Pontins document listing what were considered to be common Irish surnames, deeming people so named to be "undesirable guests" whose booking was to be refused. This was done to be able to refuse bookings from Romani and Irish Travellers based on their name; discrimination was also by accent. The practice was investigated by the EHRC, which found Pontins was "directly discriminating on the basis of race", breaching the Equality Act 2010. The Britannia Hotel Group, which owns Pontins, made a legal agreement with the EHRC to investigate and end the practice, and change its policies and systems accordingly.

== Resorts ==
As of January 2025, Pontins operated only one traditional holiday resort:

- Brean Sands, Burnham on Sea, Somerset (closed to guests from January 2023 to 2026 to house workers constructing the Hinkley Point C nuclear power station). Reopening date unconfirmed.

In addition, two Pontins parks were converted into independent holiday villages, suitable only for persons aged 18 years and over.

- Pakefield, Suffolk (adults-only since 2020, closed to guests from January 2025 in order to house workers constructing the Sizewell C nuclear power station)
- Sand Bay - Weston Super Mare. The last park still open. Adults only, still referred to as a Pontins, though most of the signage just says 'Sand Bay holiday village'. Is now run by an independent company.

Location of current Pontins holiday camps

== Resorts closed or sold ==
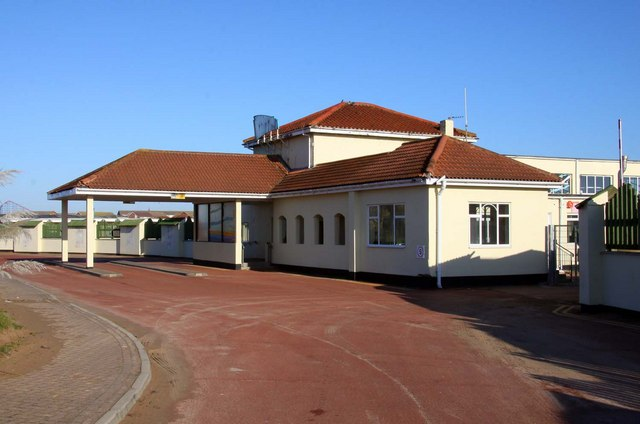
Entrance to Blackpool camp in November 2009, shortly after closure

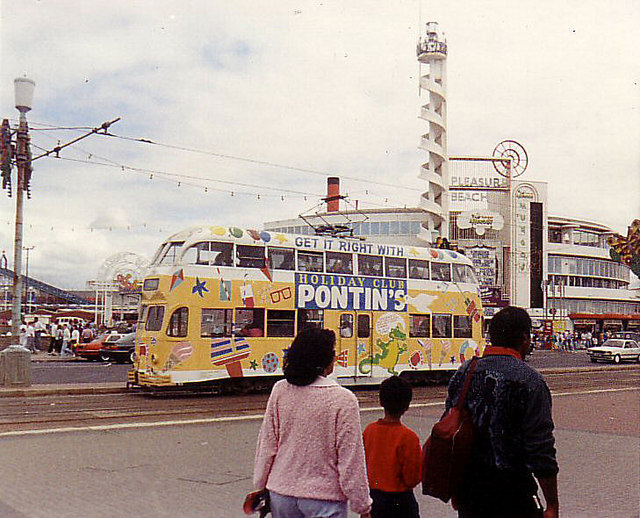
Balloon car 707, seen with an all over advert for Pontin's, at Blackpool Pleasure Beach in 1990

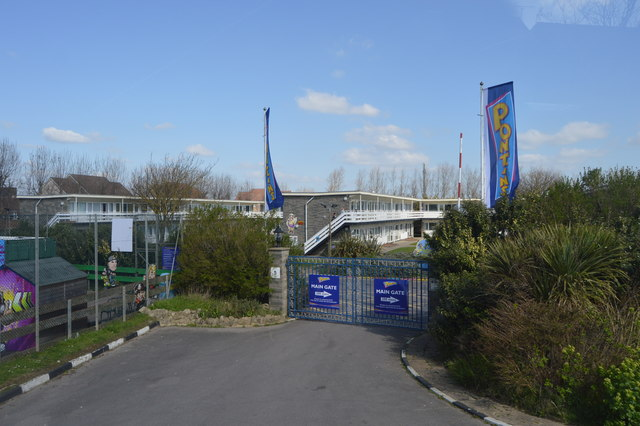
Chalets at former Camber Sands camp

This is a list of some former Pontins resorts in the UK and Ireland that have either closed or been sold:

- Barton Hall, Torquay, Devon; now a PGL site from 2010 (children's activity holidays)
- Bay View, Brixham, Devon
- Blackpool, Lancashire; closed 2 October 2009; demolished and cleared, housing is now on the site
- Bracklesham Bay, Chichester, West Sussex
- Broadreeds, Selsey, West Sussex
- Buckleigh Place, Westward Ho!, Devon
- Camber Sands, Camber, East Sussex (closed 30 November 2023 - currently being redeveloped with no reopening date at present)
- Dolphin Holiday Village, Brixham, Devon
- Homelea Holiday Camp, Brixham, Devon
- Hemsby, Norfolk; (closed January 2009); now owned by Northern Trust; as of 2023 it is back on the market
- Jersey Holiday Village, Portelet Bay, Jersey
- Little Canada, Wootton, Isle of Wight; now a PGL site (children's activity holidays) (formerly 3D Education from 1995 to 2002)
- Lydstep Haven, near Tenby, South Wales
- Middleton Tower, Heysham, Lancashire; site now a retirement village (opened 2007)
- Osmington Bay, Weymouth, Dorset; now a PGL site (children's activity holidays) (formerly 3D Education from 1995 to 2002)
- Plemont Bay, Jersey
- Pendine Sands, Carmarthenshire, South Wales
- Riviera Chalet Hotel, Bowleaze Cove (near Preston), Weymouth, Dorset
- Prestatyn Sands Holiday Park, North Wales (closed 30 November 2023 - under redevelopment)
- Sands Hotel, Prestatyn, Denbighshire, North Wales
- Sandy Bay, Northumberland
- Seacroft, Hemsby, Norfolk, Opposite side of the road from the other Hemsby site. Since 1998, owned and run by Richardson's as Hemsby Beach Holiday Park
- South Devon, Paignton, Devon
- South Downs, Bracklesham Bay, near Chichester
- Southport, Merseyside (closed 4 January 2024 following extensive damage caused by flooding from a storm - awaiting redevelopment)
- St Mary's Bay, Brixham, Devon; now a Park Holidays UK site
- Torbay Chalet Hotel, Paignton, Devon
- Tower Beach, Prestatyn, Denbighshire, North Wales
- Trabolgan, County Cork, Ireland; currently operating as "Trabolgan Holiday Village"
- Wick Ferry, Christchurch, Dorset
- Wall Park, Brixham; left derelict for years once new owners closed the park. Now demolished and cleared for Devon housing.

== In popular culture ==
- The 1973 British film Holiday on the Buses was filmed at and set in the Prestatyn resort. A plaque was erected in 2004 at the main entrance gates (unchanged since the film was shot) to note this event. The same venue hosted professional snooker each year. Prestatyn Sands also hosted the finals for the annual Brass Band Festival; historically, the qualifying rounds were held in other Pontins centres.
- The previous On The Buses film, Mutiny on the Buses (1972), depicted buses carrying adverts with the slogan "Go Pontinental", a chain of holiday villages set up in Continental Europe.
- In November 2020, Liverpool-based indie band Courting released their fourth single 'Popshop!' which mentions the resort (in particular the Southport site) in its lyrics saying: "take the lads on tour, we'll go to Pontins."
- On the comedy panel game show 8 Out of 10 Cats Does Countdown, host Jimmy Carr introduces the team captains and guests with satirical introductions. On episode 13 of series 9, Carr introduced guest team captain Lee Mack with "Lee used to work as a Pontins Bluecoat, but left when he realized it was no longer the (nineteen) fifties."
