= Riviera Hotel, Weymouth =

Hotel in Dorset, England

Riviera Hotel
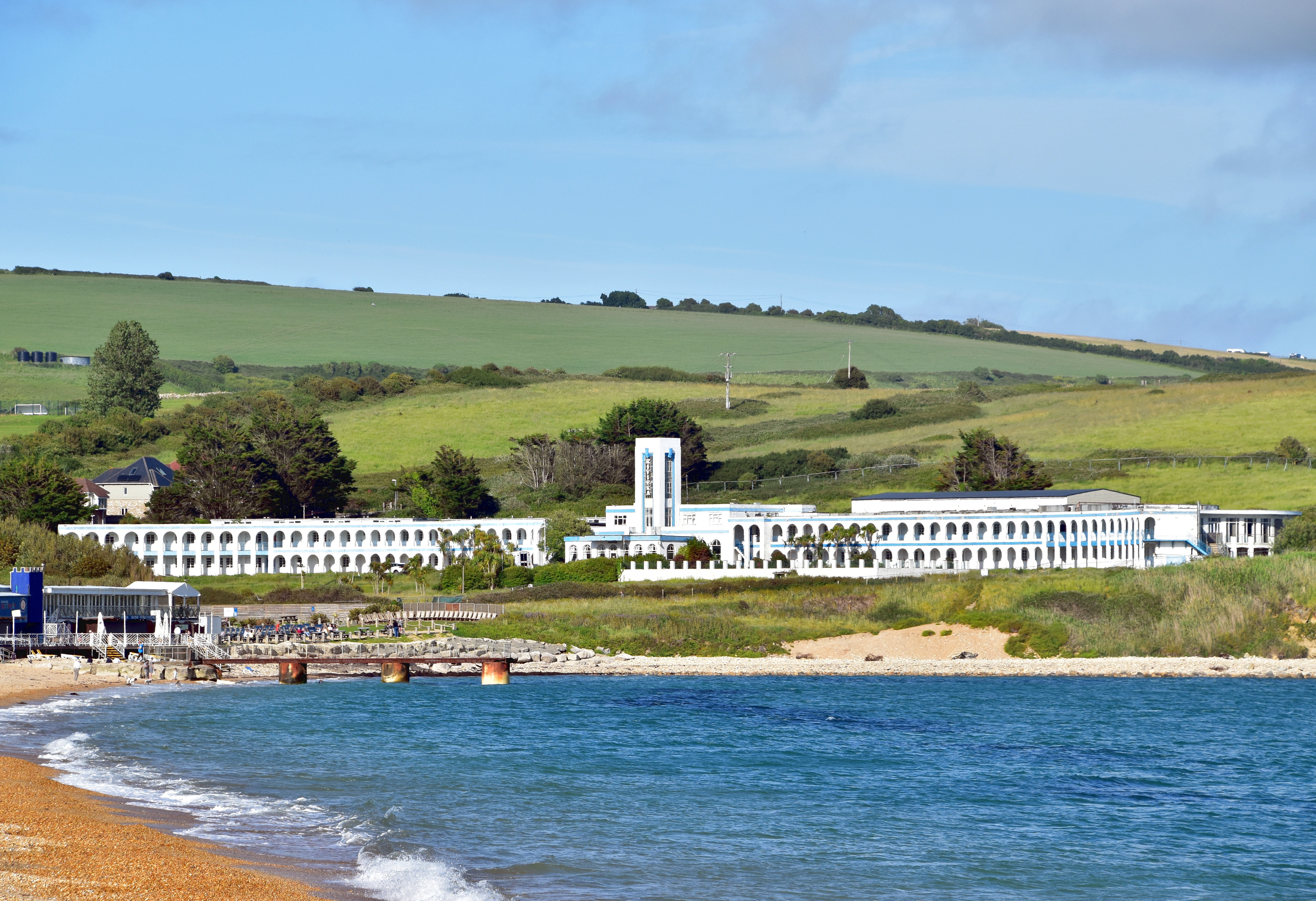
- Riviera Hotel in 2026

- Location within Dorset Location within the United Kingdom
- 50.6363°N 2.4182°W
- Location: Bowleaze Cove, Weymouth, Dorset, England

History
- Built: 1936–1937

Site notes
- Architect: Lionel Stewart Smith

Listed Building – Grade II
- Official name: Riviera Hotel, Bowleaze Coveway
- Designated: 28 January 1997
- Reference no.: 1135188

Riviera Hotel is a hotel at Bowleaze Cove, Weymouth, Dorset, England. Overlooking Weymouth Bay, the hotel was built in 1936–37 and has been a Grade II listed building since 1997. Historic England has remarked that it "epitomises the austere approach of the modernists in the immediate pre-war era, and suggests the designer's acquaintance with contemporary work in Rome and elsewhere".

== History ==
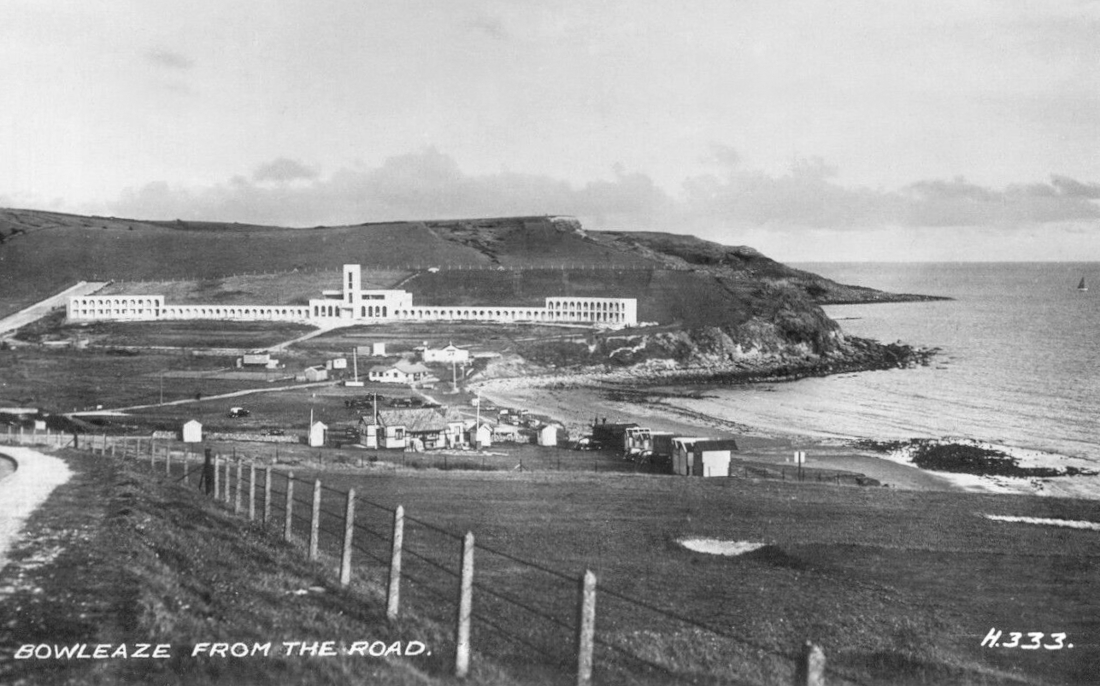
The Riviera Hotel and Bowleaze Cove as seen in 1938.

The Riviera Hotel was built in 1936–37 for a cost of around £40,000. It was designed in a modernist, Spanish-style by the Weymouth architect Lionel Stewart Smith and was constructed by Truscon Ltd. As the hotel neared completion, its owner went bankrupt and the hotel remained closed, with only a caretaker, appointed by the Official receiver at Bristol, remaining on site.

The hotel was subsequently sold and first opened for the summer holiday season on 28 May 1939. Advertised as "Weymouth's most perfect holiday centre", the Riviera had approximately 70 bedrooms within its two long accommodation arcs. Symmetrical in design, both arcs were originally single-storey with a two-storey wing at each end. All of the rooms were fitted with divan beds, central heating, and hot and cold water. The central block between the two arcs contained the reception, dining hall, dance room and other facilities. Outside the hotel had its own private beach and various sport amenities, including a tennis court, bowling green and putting green.

During World War II, the hotel housed disabled evacuee children under the age of 14, with most of them coming from London area. In 1958, the hotel was taken over by Fred Pontin as part of his holiday camp chain Pontins. In c. 1960, the single-storey sections of the two accommodation blocks were extended to provide an extra storey, increasing the total number of bedrooms to around 100, and a ballroom was also built.

The ballroom suffered a fire in December 1960, leaving a 15 foot hole through its wooden floor and a load of debris in the billiard room below. Another fire occurred in August 1968, damaging the ballroom, bar, café, nursery and billiard room, areas all within the central part of the hotel. The hotel's 300 guests were evacuated at around 3am but were able to return to their rooms two hours later.

In 1999, the hotel was sold to Hollybush Associates, who carried out a £1 million refurbishment by 2002. In 2009, the hotel was sold for £3.5 million to the Saudi Arabian hospitality chain Diyafa Group. It then underwent a £4 million refurbishment scheme between 2010 and 2012, which included reducing the hotel's number of rooms by making each one larger, updating the reception and dining room areas, and providing a repainting of the exterior.

During the COVID-19 pandemic, the hotel provided temporary accommodation for the homeless in 2020–21. In 2020, the hotel was placed on the market for £5.5 million, but failed to attract a buyer and was removed from the market the following year. In 2023, the hotel was listed on the Twentieth Century Society's 'Buildings at risk' register due to "decline and neglect".
