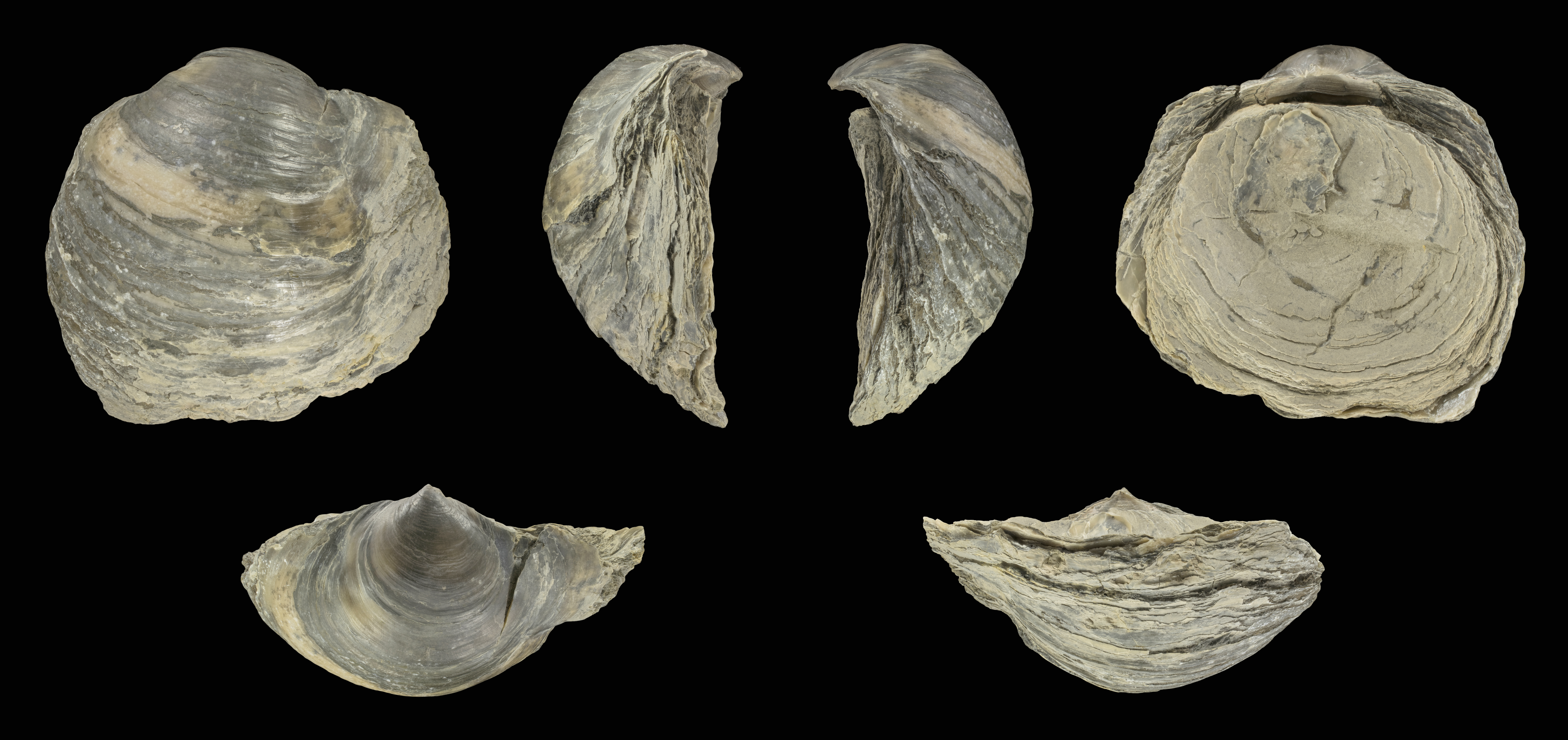
- Gryphaea dilatata, 8½cm high

Scientific classification
- Kingdom: Animalia
- Phylum: Mollusca
- Class: Bivalvia
- Order: Ostreida
- Family: Gryphaeidae
- Genus: †Gryphaea
- Species: †G. dilatata

Binomial name
- †Gryphaea dilatata J. Sowerby, 1818

= Gryphaea dilatata =

Gryphaea dilatata Temporal range: oxfordian–kimmeridgian

Extinct species of bivalve

Gryphea dilatata, common name "devil's toenail" is a species of Jurassic oyster, an extinct marine bivalve mollusc in the family Gryphaeidae.

This fossil oyster is frequently found in abundance in the localities where it occurs. It belongs to the Oxfordian and Kimmeridgian clays of the Jurassic and can grow to a diameter in excess of 15 centimetres (5.9 in).

It lived a sedentary life-style, settled on the sea bed and was a filter feeder. Its abundance at certain localities — such as Furzy Cliff, Weymouth, Dorset, (England) — suggests it often formed large beds of hundreds of individuals.

It is closely related to the similar species Gryphaea dilobotes.

== See also ==
- Gryphaea arcuata
- Jurassic Coast
