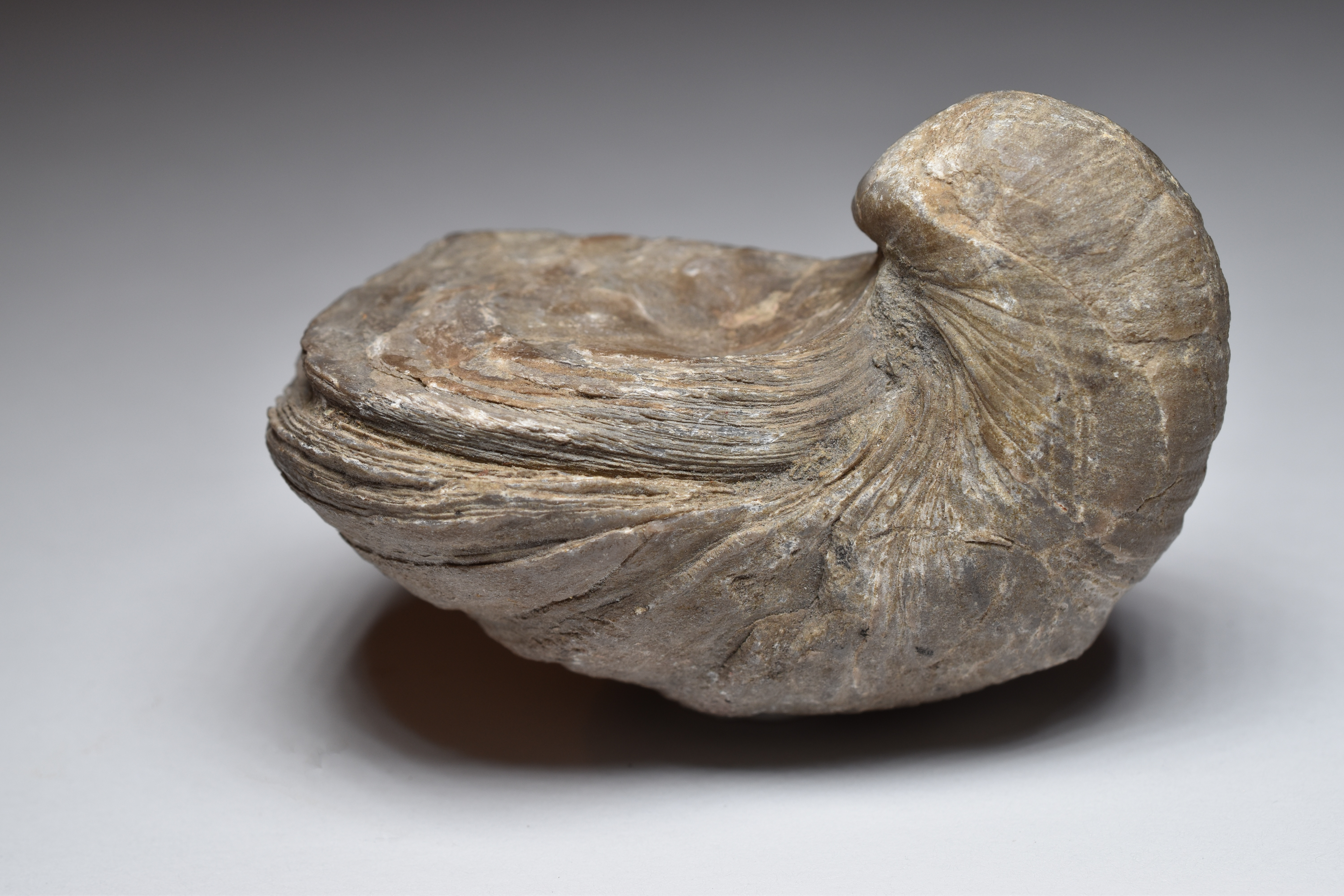
- Gryphaea sp. from Redcar, England

Scientific classification
- Kingdom: Animalia
- Phylum: Mollusca
- Class: Bivalvia
- Order: Ostreida
- Superfamily: Ostreoidea
- Family: Gryphaeidae
- Genus: †Gryphaea; Lamarck, 1801

Type species
- †Gryphaea arcuata Lamarck, 1801

= Gryphaea =

Gryphaea Temporal range: 237–154.8 Ma Carnian - Oxfordian

Genus of Triassic-Jurassic gryphaeid bivalve molluscs (fossil)

Gryphaea (commonly known as devil's toenails) is a genus of marine gryphaeid oysters known from the Mesozoic Era. Its fossils are almost worldwide-known but they are mostly common in Jurassic strata from Europe, North America, and South America. Gryphaea fossils are particularly important in the tectonically deformed Andean basins of Argentina and Chile and serve as index fossils. Gryphaea species appeared during the Late Triassic period and flourished during the Early Jurassic, eventually becoming extinct around the Late Jurassic. The name "devil's toenail" originated because of the curved shells of Gryphaea resembling a toenail. There used to be a common folk belief that carrying one of these fossils could prevent rheumatism.

A complete Gryphaea shell consists of two articulated valves: a larger gnarly-shaped valve and a smaller, flattened valve. The soft parts of the animal occupied the cavity between the two shells, just like modern oysters. The larger, curved valve sat within the soft sediment on the sea floor. In seabeds dominated by soft sediments, Gryphaea shells provided stable surfaces for colonization by benthic organisms. The shells also feature prominent growth bands and some of them can provide sclerochronological measurements. Some species of Gryphaea reacted greatly to the paleoenvironments in which they lived, such as G. arcuata, where cold marine environments favored the formation of thicker shells and warmer environments produced thinner shells. Gryphaea lived on the sea bed in shallow waters, likely in large colonies. It has been suggested that Gryphaea and similar bivalves became extinct near the Cretaceous due to the evolution of durophagous predators and the increasing reworking of sediments which negatively affected their reclining mode of life on the sea floor.

The material from Cretaceous units referred to Gryphaea (G. accipiter, G. newberryi, G. convexa, among others) has been progressively separated from this genus and reassigned to separate taxa, namely Pycnodonte and Texigryphaea, based on different geological ages and evolutionary history, as well as distinct morphology. The bulk of the evolutionary history and diversification of Gryphaea, which started in the Late Triassic, in strict sense is restricted to the Jurassic.

== Species ==
Species	Epoch	Occurrence
† Gryphaea arcuataeformis (Kiparisova, 1936)	Carnian	Reported from Late Carnian strata of northeast Oregon, Late Carnian and Norian Pardonet Formation of northeast British Columbia, and also the Early Carnian-Middle? Norian Shublik Formation and the Norian Farewell Terrane from Alaska. The species has also been reported to occur in Late Carnian units of the Sverdrup Basin at Canada, and from Late Carnian-Middle Norian strata in Siberia. G. arcuataeformis accounts for the oldest known Gryphaea species with diagnostic characters.
† Gryphaea arcuataeformis (Kiparisova, 1936)	Norian	Reported from Late Carnian strata of northeast Oregon, Late Carnian and Norian Pardonet Formation of northeast British Columbia, and also the Early Carnian-Middle? Norian Shublik Formation and the Norian Farewell Terrane from Alaska. The species has also been reported to occur in Late Carnian units of the Sverdrup Basin at Canada, and from Late Carnian-Middle Norian strata in Siberia. G. arcuataeformis accounts for the oldest known Gryphaea species with diagnostic characters.
† Gryphaea nevadensis (McRoberts, 1992)	Norian	Occurs at the Cedar Mountains of west-central Nevada in Early Norian strata of the Luning Formation.
† Gryphaea arcuata (Lamarck, 1801)	Hettangian	Occurs in multiple localities and units across Hettangian-Sinemurian units and biostratigraphic zones of Europe where it remains as the best documented species of Gryphaea. This species accounts for the prime reference/depiction of this taxon in literature and media.
† Gryphaea arcuata (Lamarck, 1801)	Sinemurian	Occurs in multiple localities and units across Hettangian-Sinemurian units and biostratigraphic zones of Europe where it remains as the best documented species of Gryphaea. This species accounts for the prime reference/depiction of this taxon in literature and media.
† Gryphaea mccullochii (Sowerby, 1829)	Sinemurian	Known from Sinemurian-Pliensbachian beds of Scotland and England. Constitutes an evolutionary lineage from G. arcuata.
† Gryphaea mccullochii (Sowerby, 1829)	Pliensbachian	Known from Sinemurian-Pliensbachian beds of Scotland and England. Constitutes an evolutionary lineage from G. arcuata.
† Gryphaea gigantea (Sowerby, 1823)	Pliensbachian	A large-sized species that occurs in Late Pliensbachian beds of England and Hungary. Constitutes an evolutionary lineage from G. arcuata.
† Gryphaea darwinii (Forbes, 1846)	Hettangian	Occurs in the Jurassic (Hettangian-Toarcian) localities of the Atacama Region of Chile attributable to the Lautaro Formation. Specimens from Sinemurian levels of the Canto del Agua Formation at San José (Huasco) have been compared to this species. It is considered an index fossil for Chile.
† Gryphaea darwinii (Forbes, 1846)	Sinemurian	Occurs in the Jurassic (Hettangian-Toarcian) localities of the Atacama Region of Chile attributable to the Lautaro Formation. Specimens from Sinemurian levels of the Canto del Agua Formation at San José (Huasco) have been compared to this species. It is considered an index fossil for Chile.
† Gryphaea darwinii (Forbes, 1846)	Pliensbachian	Occurs in the Jurassic (Hettangian-Toarcian) localities of the Atacama Region of Chile attributable to the Lautaro Formation. Specimens from Sinemurian levels of the Canto del Agua Formation at San José (Huasco) have been compared to this species. It is considered an index fossil for Chile.
† Gryphaea darwinii (Forbes, 1846)	Toarcian	Occurs in the Jurassic (Hettangian-Toarcian) localities of the Atacama Region of Chile attributable to the Lautaro Formation. Specimens from Sinemurian levels of the Canto del Agua Formation at San José (Huasco) have been compared to this species. It is considered an index fossil for Chile.
† Gryphaea apiculata (Rubilar, 2005)	Bajocian	Reported from the Middle Bajocian beds of Quebrada El Asiento near El Salvador, Chile.
† Gryphaea varillasensis (Rubilar, 2005)	Bajocian	Known specimens have been recovered from Late Early Bajocian-Late Bathonian units at Quebrada Las Varillas, near Salar de Pedernales, Chile.
† Gryphaea varillasensis (Rubilar, 2005)	Bathonian	Known specimens have been recovered from Late Early Bajocian-Late Bathonian units at Quebrada Las Varillas, near Salar de Pedernales, Chile.
† Gryphaea oxytropis (Philippi, 1899)	Bajocian	Represents an index fossil in South America and occurs in Jurassic (Bajocian-Callovian) localities across Argentina and Chile.
† Gryphaea oxytropis (Philippi, 1899)	Bathonian	Represents an index fossil in South America and occurs in Jurassic (Bajocian-Callovian) localities across Argentina and Chile.
† Gryphaea oxytropis (Philippi, 1899)	Callovian	Represents an index fossil in South America and occurs in Jurassic (Bajocian-Callovian) localities across Argentina and Chile.
† Gryphaea euteicha (Rubilar, 2005)	Bathonian	Occurs in Late Bathonian and Callovian beds at Quebrada Las Varillas and Quebrada El Asiento, near El Salvador and Salar de Pedernales, Chile.
† Gryphaea euteicha (Rubilar, 2005)	Callovian	Occurs in Late Bathonian and Callovian beds at Quebrada Las Varillas and Quebrada El Asiento, near El Salvador and Salar de Pedernales, Chile.
† Gryphaea dilatata (Sowerby, 1816)	Callovian	Widespread species known to occur in Jurassic (Callovian-Oxfordian) units and localities of Europe and North America.
† Gryphaea dilatata (Sowerby, 1816)	Oxfordian	Widespread species known to occur in Jurassic (Callovian-Oxfordian) units and localities of Europe and North America.

== See also ==
- Ostreidae
- Aetostreon
- Weyla
