= Greenhill Gardens, Weymouth =

Public gardens in Dorset, England

Coordinates: 50.6210°N 2.4478°W

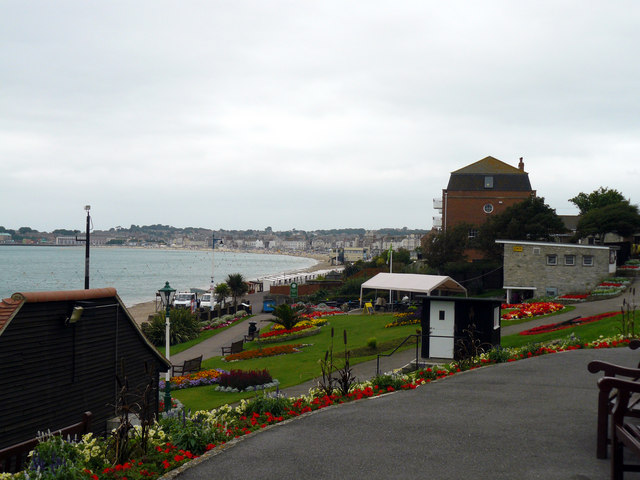
Greenhill Gardens.

Greenhill Gardens is a public garden in Weymouth, Dorset, England, on the edge of the town centre, sloping up from the beach and promenade, and overlooking Weymouth's seafront and across the bay. It is in Weymouth's northeastern suburb Greenhill.

== History ==
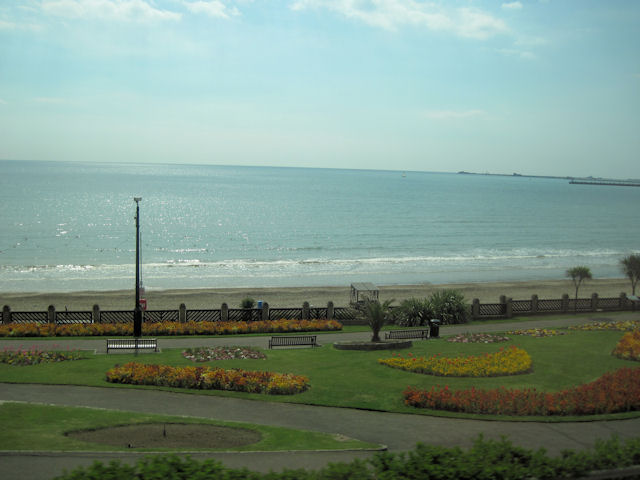
Greenhill Gardens.

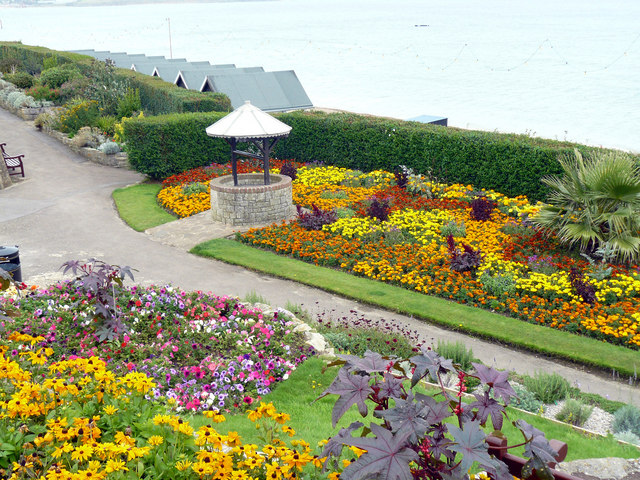
Greenhill Gardens and the Wishing Well.

The Gardens were originally part of the Wilton Estate and were handed over as a gift to the local council in 1902 for "the benefit of the inhabitants of Weymouth." The garden has been recognised as one of the best green spaces in the country by being awarded Green Flag status based on how safe, clean, accessible, well managed and welcoming they are. The Green Flag Award scheme is the national standard for parks and green spaces across England and Wales, and is held by the best parks and gardens in the UK. As of 2013, it is the 5th consecutive year that Greenhill Gardens has been recognised for the award.

Within the gardens, Bennett's Shelter, a benevolent donation made by Mayor V H Bennett, was constructed in 1919. The original shelter had lower wooden sections that have since been replaced by Portland stone walling, whilst the upper timber structure and tiled roof are essentially in its original form. The shelter continues to provide shelter to today's visitors. The Schneider Trophy weathervane is a memorial to the former Weymouth College student, Lieutenant George Stainforth, who set a world record air speed in a Schneider Supermarine S6B seaplane in 1931. The weather vane was originally presented in 1932 to Weymouth College (the former public school, not the present Weymouth College, which was formerly Weymouth Grammar School) as a memorial to Stainforth. Made of hardwood and covered in a copper sheath, the vane was erected above Weymouth College chapel in 1932, but moved for safety at the start of World War II. It was later presented to the borough council and placed in the gardens in May 1952. In 1996, the vane had to be taken down after the effects of years of sea spray and coastal winds had taken their toll, however it was restored in 1999 by a local marine engineer.

In 1936, a floral clock with a cuckoo type chime, was built by Ritchie & Sons of Edinburgh. It features an adjacent clock house, holding the original mechanism that keeps the clock ticking. Since its creation, it has become one of the most popular features of the gardens. In the late 1980s, a wishing well, donated by Melcombe Regis Rotary Club, was introduced into the lower gardens, and any monies thrown into the well are collected and presented to a local charity. In 2006, the council were considering plans to erect a large Restaurant on the tennis courts in the Gardens. This plan was received with almost universal dismay and was subsequently shelved.

The gardens were highlighted on national news in the summer of 2009 when pensioner Eleanor Boucher from Glastonbury, Somerset, found a postcard from Weymouth on her doormat of the gardens. After looking at it for a few moments she realised she was there - sunning herself in the picture taken 17 years before as a professional photographer snapped the shot for the postcard as Boucher, and her two daughters enjoyed a family day trip to Weymouth in 1992. Seventeen years later, her brother-in-law and his wife, who were visiting the resort, picked out the postcard by chance without noticing her in the picture.

== Features ==
The gardens largely feature brightly coloured borders, winding paths and recreational areas. Within the gardens are the Greenhill Beach Cafe - an indoor cafe with outdoor seating, which lies at the far end of the gardens. Additionally, the Seascape cafe is found at the entrance to the gardens, which has an outdoor terrace and plans for a new future wooden gazebo. Pebbles Cafe is an indoor cafe sited on top of a row of beach chalets in the area as well.

The gardens feature an 18-hole putting green and four tennis courts, which are summer time attractions used by residents and tourists alike. An attendant service is operated from June through to October, whilst the tennis courts are open to the public free of charge during the winter season. A bowling green and pavilion within the gardens is run by Greenhill Bowling Club and is situated at the rear of the tennis courts.

== Friends of Greenhill Gardens ==
The Friends of Greenhill Gardens was formed in March 2007, with the target of improving the gardens, which was done by attaining the nationally recognised Green Flag award. The group often hold various events within the gardens.

Each year a large crescent shaped bed is handed over to a charity or organisation who is celebrating a significant anniversary. The local gardeners plant out thousands of tiny bedding plants and where necessary, use coloured gravel to replicate the selected organisation's logo. In recognising the work of the group, the carpet bedding display for 2011 was dedicated to the group for their efforts in improving the gardens over the past four years.

The friends have also sponsored a raised bed area which contains plants which are designed for visually impaired visitors, whilst some special needs students from Weymouth College have been allowed to plant in an area sited near the Wishing Well.

== Gallery ==
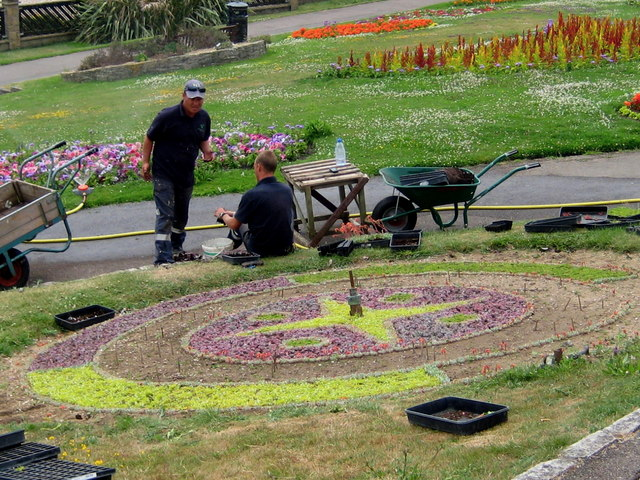
Floral Clock

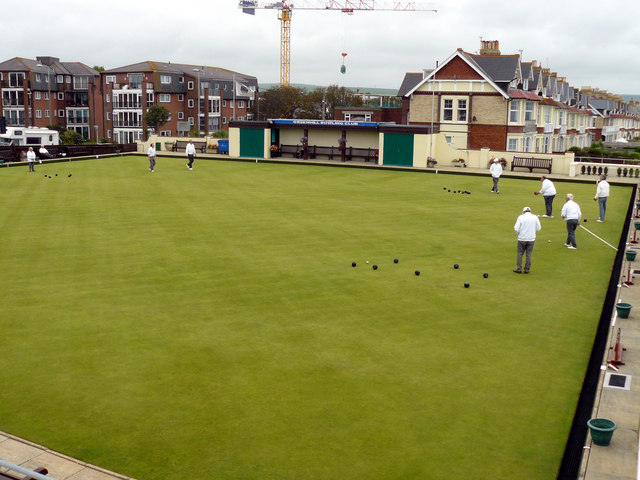
Bowling Green

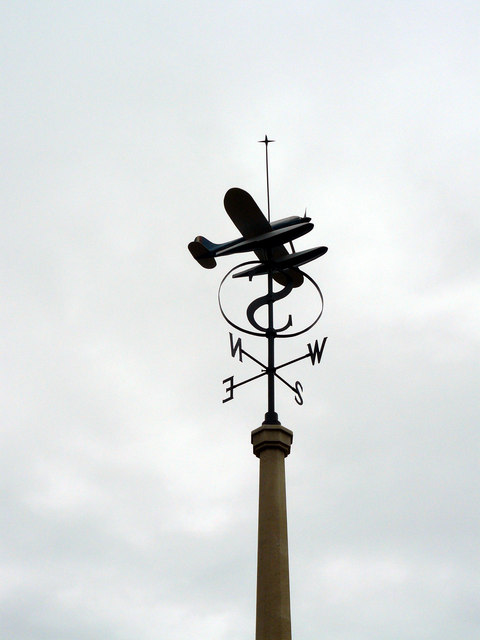
Schneider Trophy Weathervane

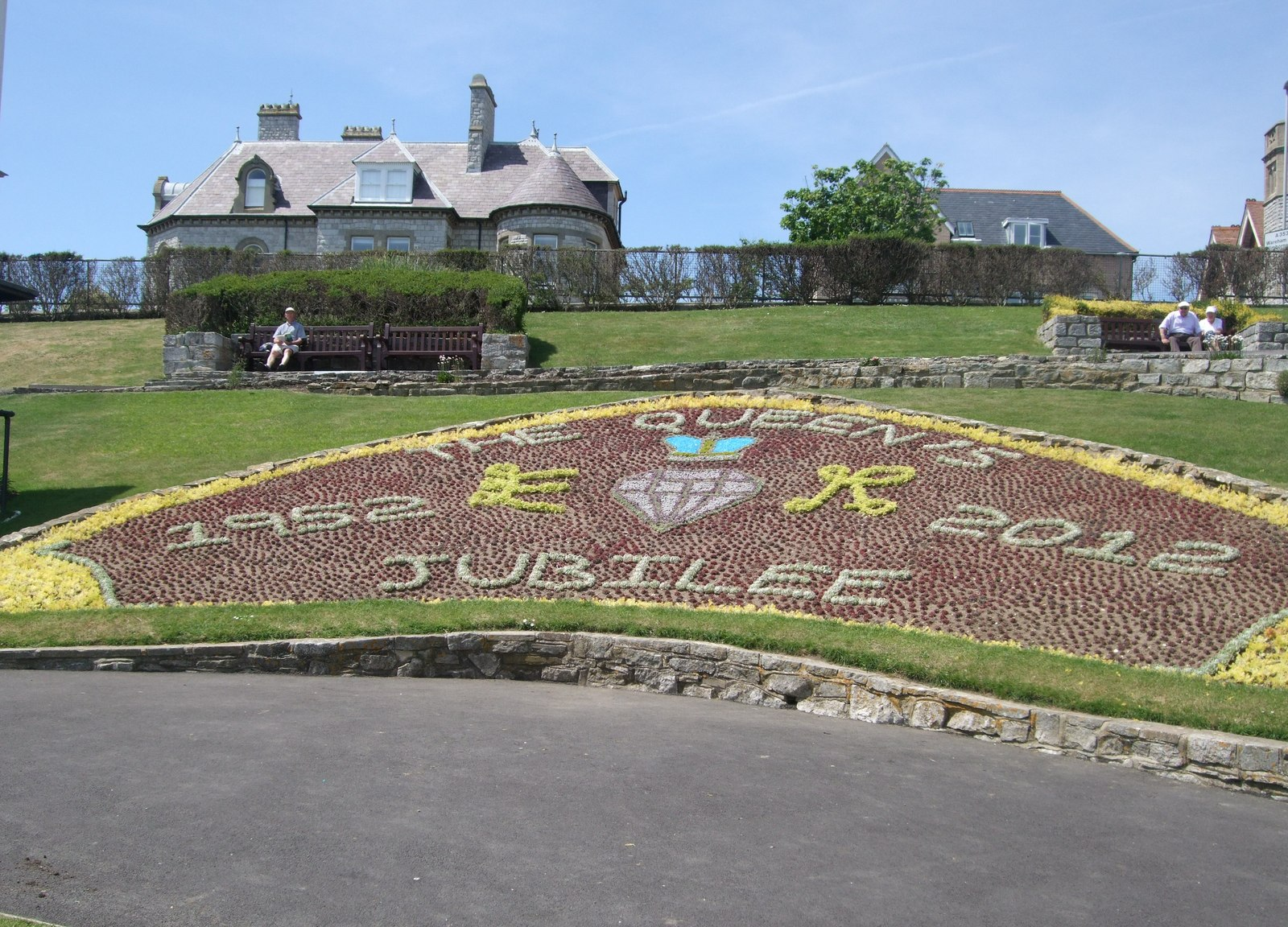
Flower design for 2012 Queen's Diamond Jubilee

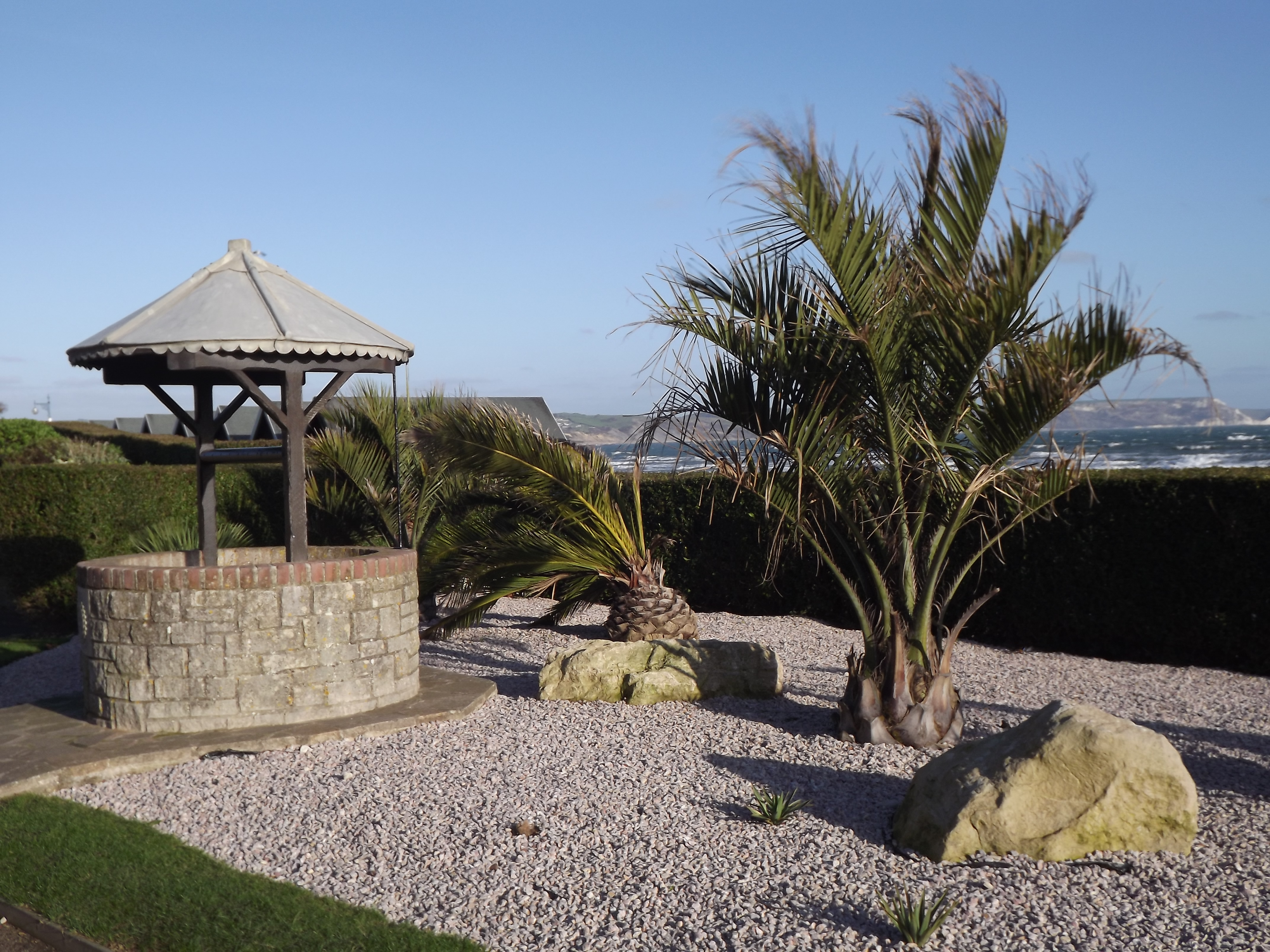
Wishing Well

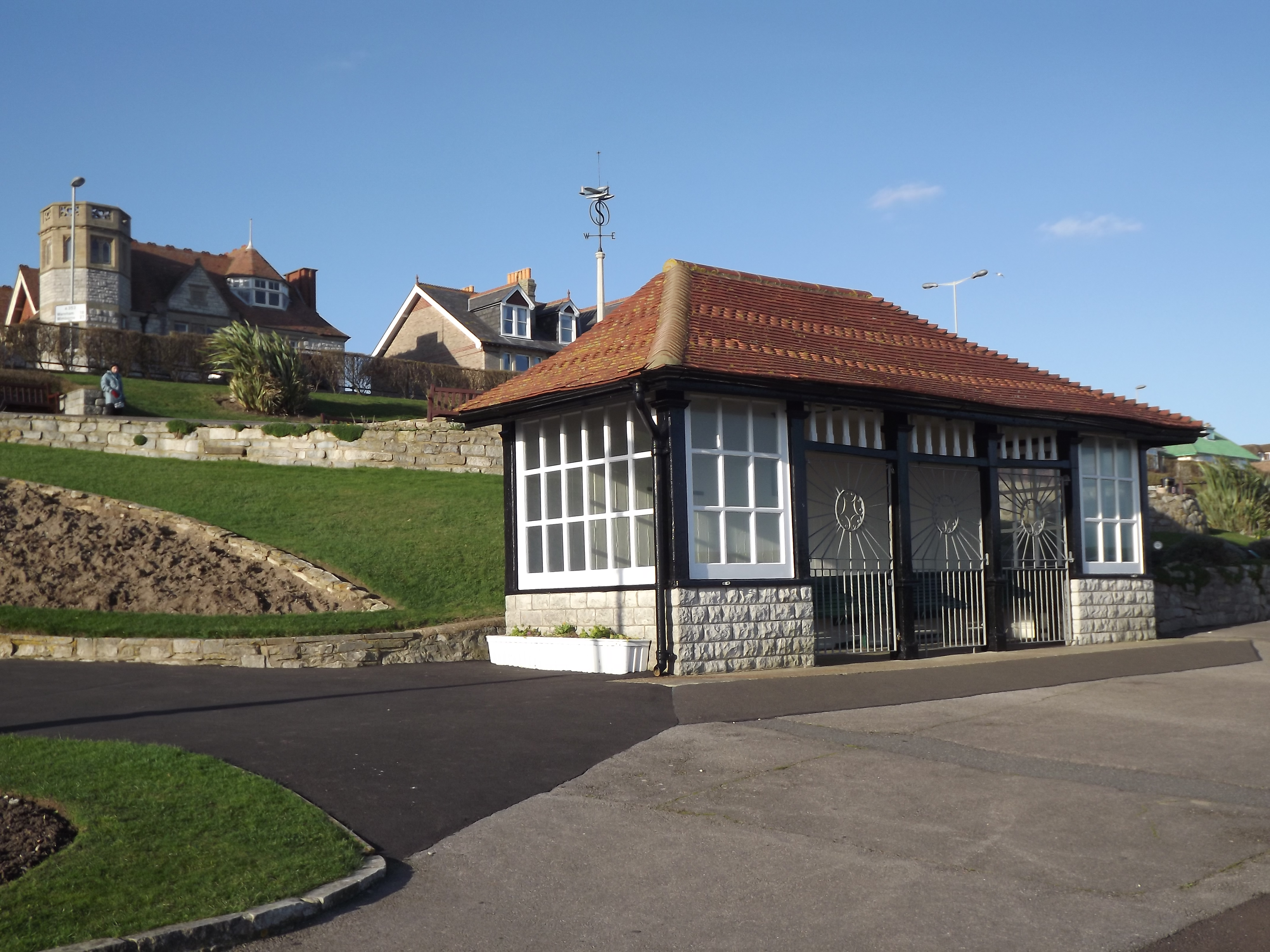
Bennett's Shelter
