= Weymouth Bay: Bowleaze Cove and Jordon Hill =

Painting by John Constable, 1816–1817

Weymouth Bay
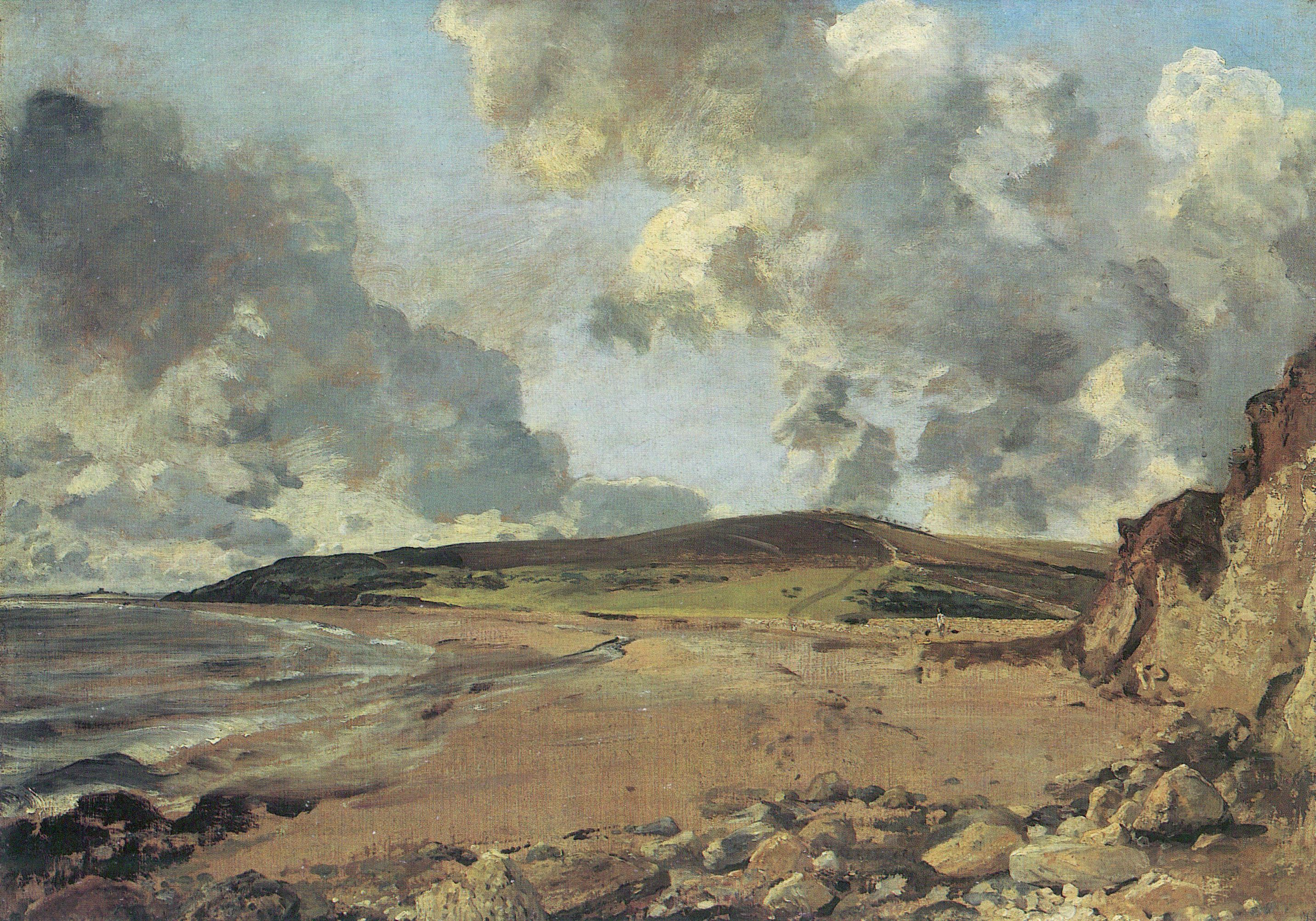
- Artist: John Constable
- Year: 1816–1817
- Medium: Oil on canvas
- Dimensions: 53 cm × 75 cm (21 in × 30 in)
- Location: National Gallery; London

Weymouth Bay: Bowleaze Cove and Jordon Hill is an oil-on-canvas painting executed between 1816 and 1817 by the English landscape artist John Constable. It is the second of three oil versions of this view painted by Constable and now hangs in the National Gallery, London.

== History ==
From mid-October to December 1816, Constable and Maria Bicknell spent their six-week honeymoon at his friend John Fisher's vicarage in the village of Osmington, near the seaside town of Weymouth in Dorset. The idea for this painting dates from this period. The painting shows a view of Weymouth Bay looking west which includes Bowleaze Cove, Jordan Hill and the small Jordan River flowing over the beach, with Furzy Cliff behind. Beyond that in the far distance is the beach at Greenhill.

== Other Versions ==
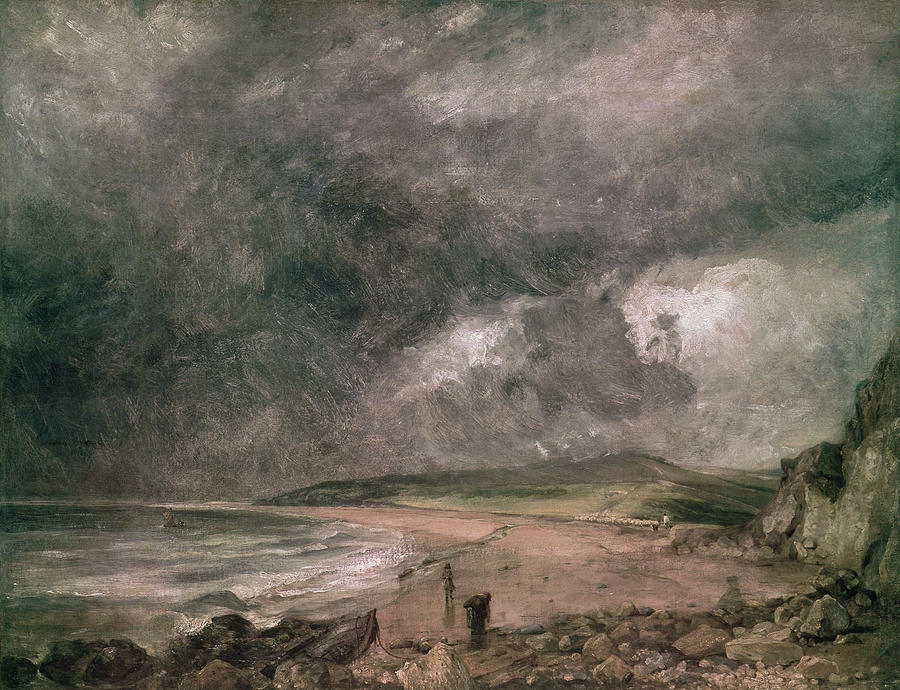
Weymouth Bay with Approaching Storm, 1819, Louvre, Paris

Prior to Weymouth Bay: Bowleaze Cove and Jordon Hill, Constable made a small oil sketch ‘Weymouth Bay’, 1816, now in the Victoria & Albert Museum in London. He is believed to have hastily painted this sketch on location. The sketch is about half the size of the National Gallery painting, which is believed to have been painted back at the vicarage where the couple were staying. The third, is a larger and more accomplished version of the National Gallery painting. It was exhibited at the British Institution under the name ‘Osmington Shore, near Weymouth’, in 1819. The painting now has the title ‘Weymouth Bay with Approaching Storm’ and hangs in the Louvre in Paris.

== See also ==
- List of paintings by John Constable
