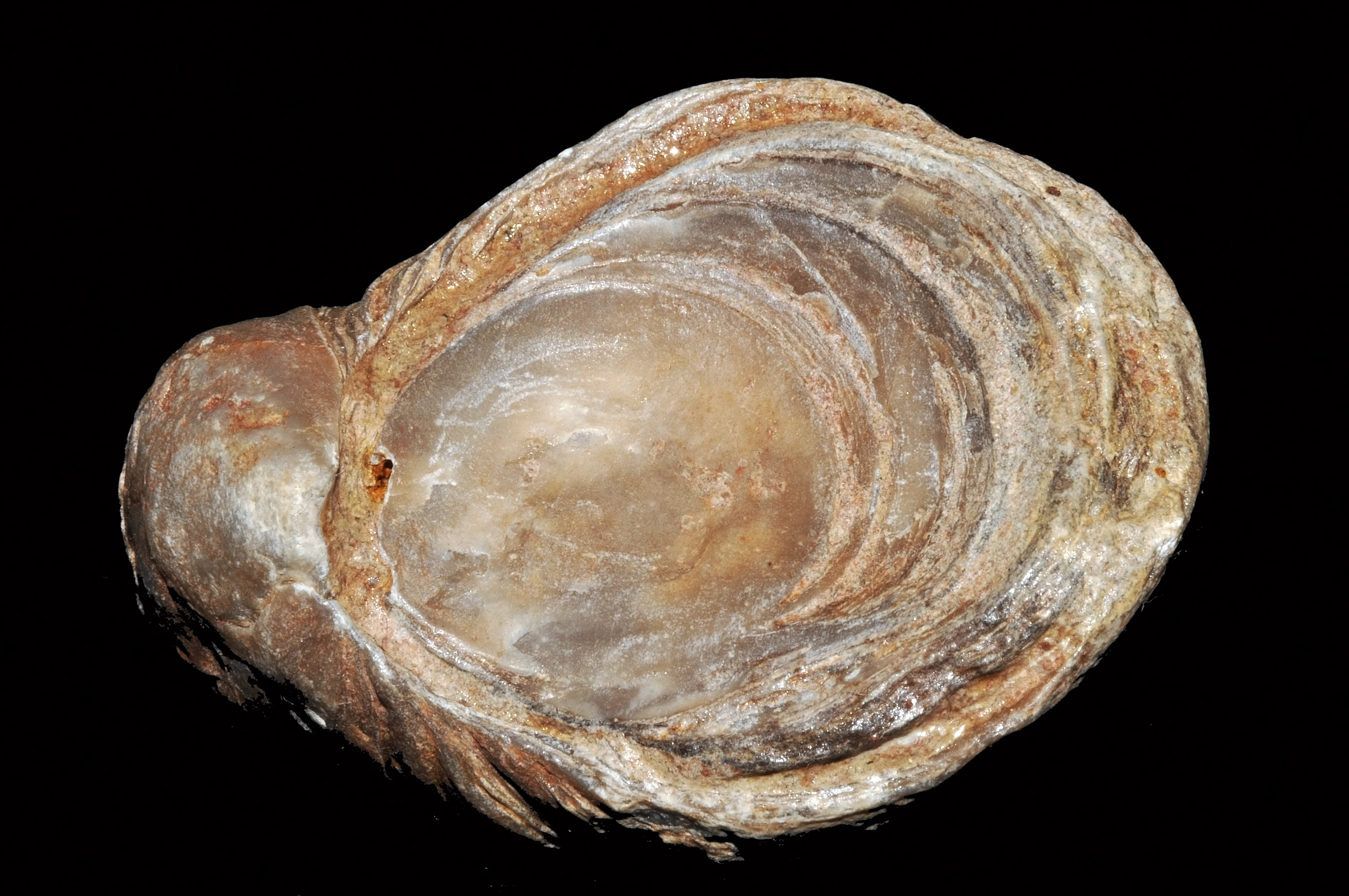

Scientific classification
- Kingdom: Animalia
- Phylum: Mollusca
- Class: Bivalvia
- Order: Ostreida
- Family: Gryphaeidae
- Genus: †Gryphaea
- Species: †G. arcuata

Binomial name
- †Gryphaea arcuata Lamarck, 1801

= Gryphaea arcuata =

Gryphaea arcuata Temporal range: Hettangian–Bajocian

Extinct species of bivalve

Gryphaea arcuata is an extinct species of foam oyster, a bivalve mollusc in the family Gryphaeidae from the Early Jurassic of Europe.

It is commonly referred to in English folklore as the 'devils toenail' due to its supposed resemblance to the devil's 'cloven hoof'.

== Sources ==
- Gryphaea arcuata in the Paleobiology Database
- Fossils (Smithsonian Handbooks) by David Ward (Page 101)
