= Jordan Hill, Dorset =

Hill in Dorset, England

Coordinates: 50.639°N 2.428°W

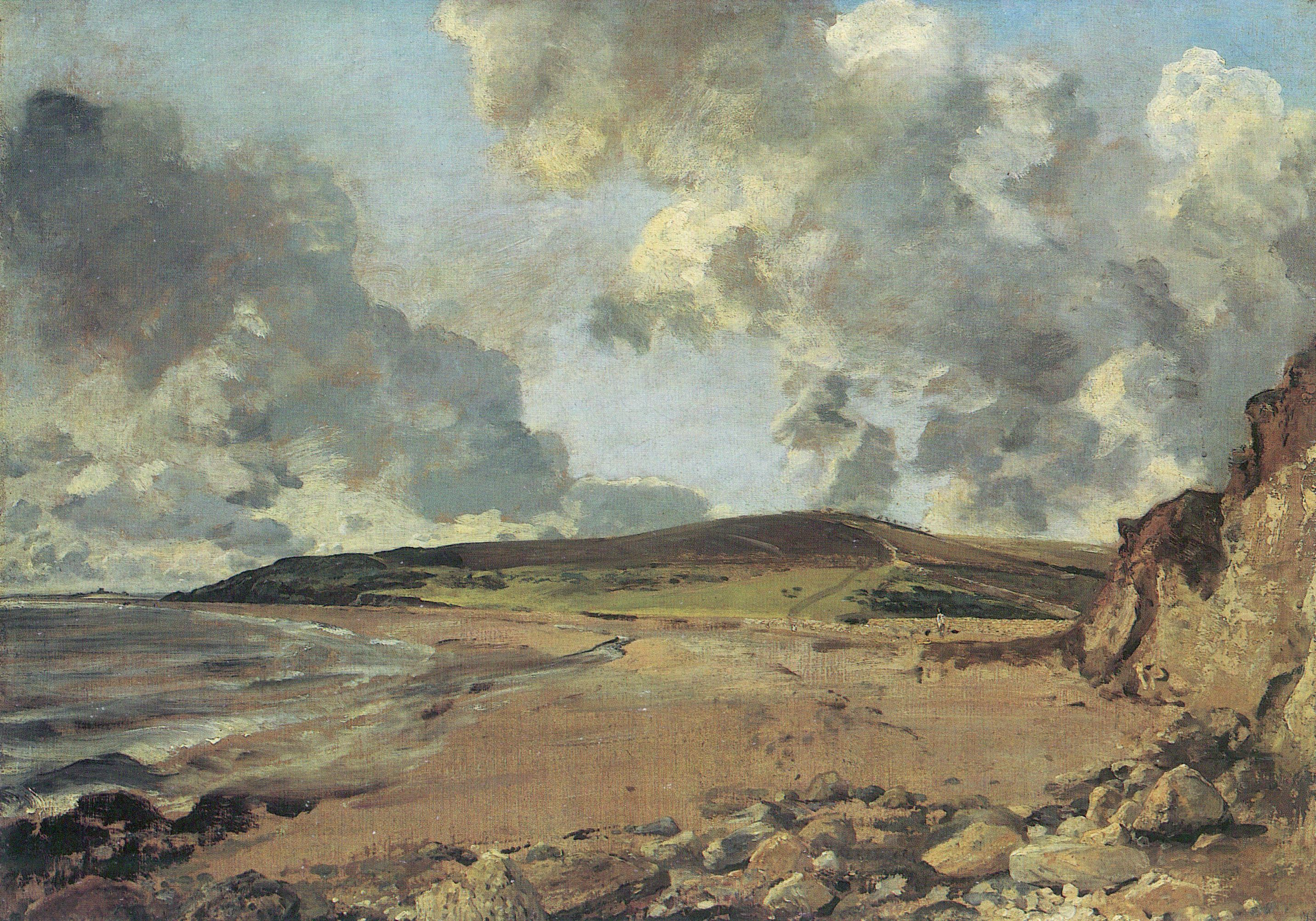
Weymouth Bay: Bowleaze Cove and Jordon Hill, painted by John Constable in 1816–17.

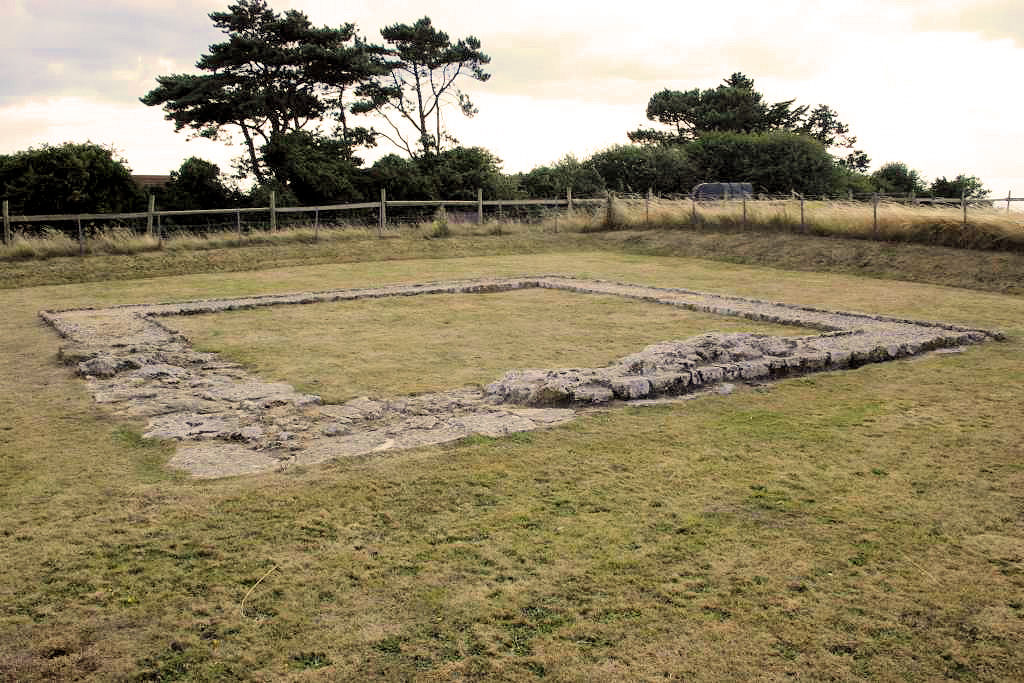
View of the Jordan Hill Roman Temple site.

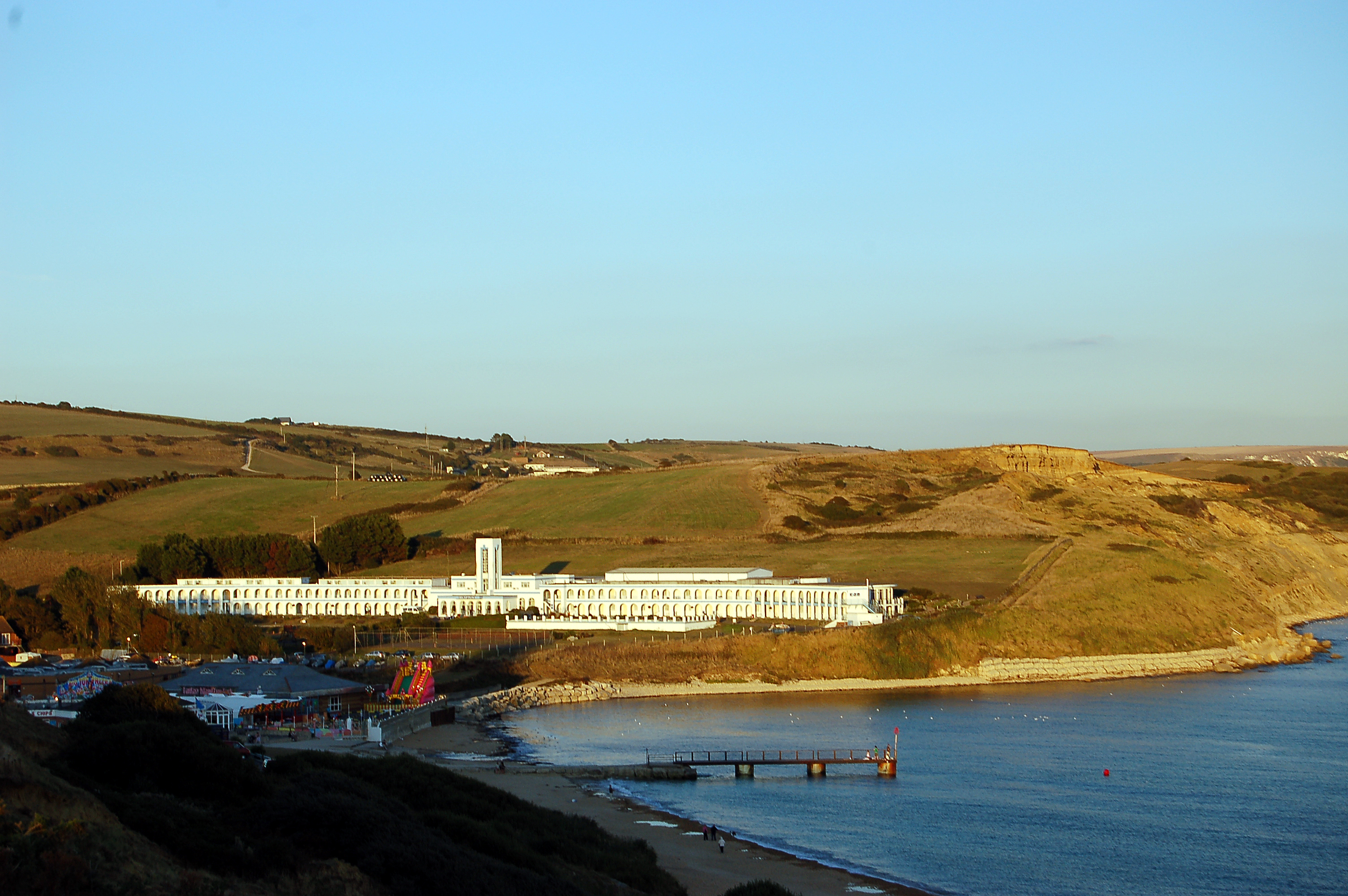
View of Bowleaze Cove from Jordan Hill.

Jordan Hill (50 m) is located near the coast close to the village of Preston, just to the east of Weymouth, Dorset, England.

== Hill ==
The hill leads down to Furzy Cliff on the coast to the south. Close by to the east is Bowleaze Cove. The hill figure of the Osmington White Horse can be seen from the hill to the north. There are also views across Bowleaze Cove from the hill and nearby public footpaths. The hill is a short detour from the South West Coastal Path National Trail.

The hill is listed as a tump in the Database of British and Irish Hills (DoBIH).

In 1816–17, the artist John Constable painted Weymouth Bay: Bowleaze Cove and Jordon Hill while on his honeymoon, viewed from the beach looking west. The painting is now in the National Gallery, London.

There are the remains of a square 4th century Romano-Celtic temple on the hill, known as the Jordan Hill Roman Temple. This is now administered by English Heritage in a fenced off section with free access.
