= Bowleaze Cove =

Sand and shingle beach, on the Jurassic Coast, Dorset, England

Coordinates: 50.6356°N 2.4206°W

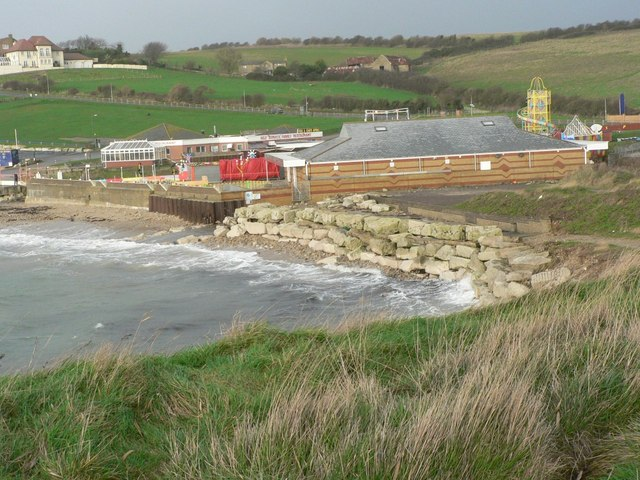
View of Bowleaze Cove.

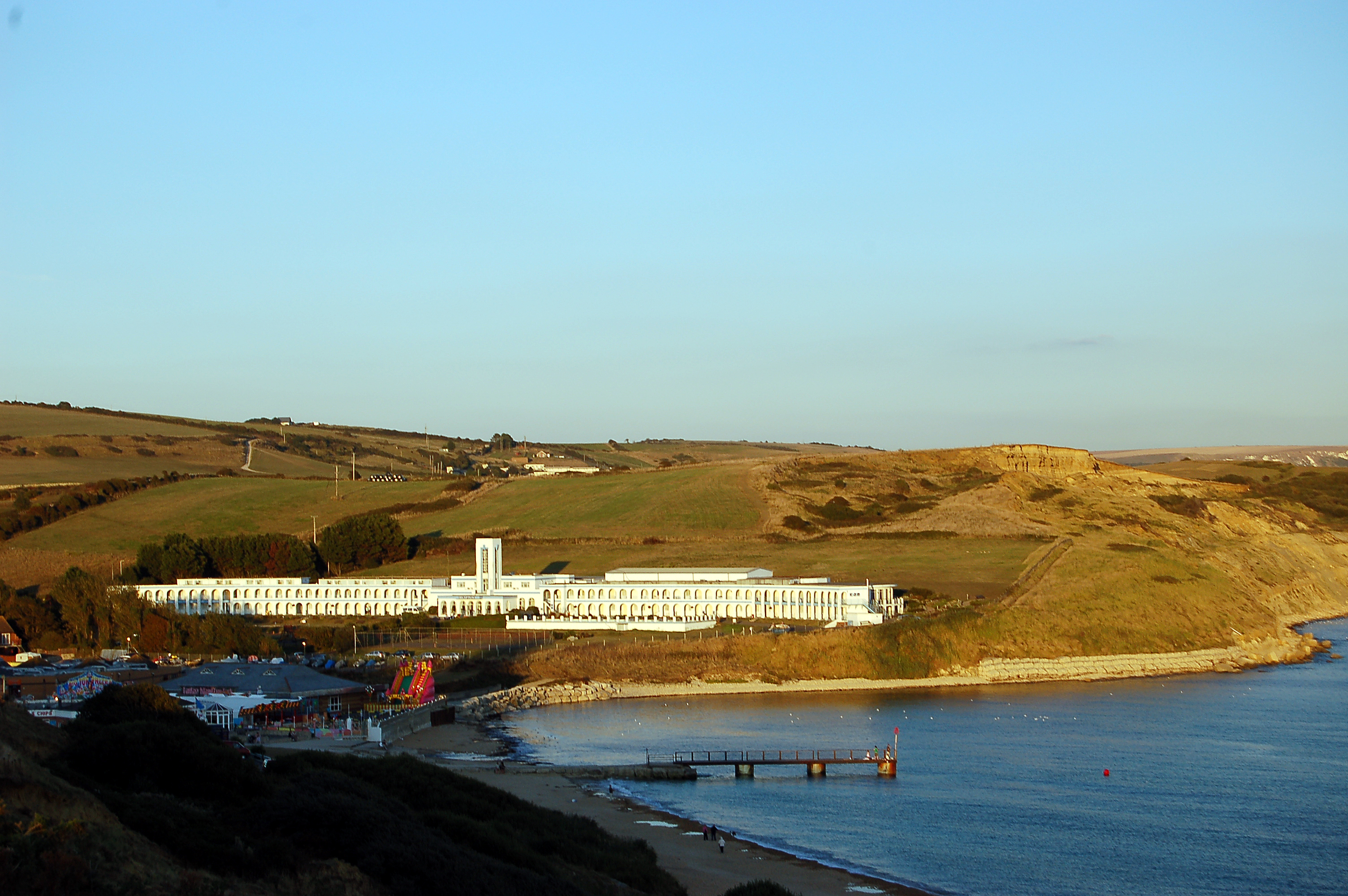
The cove from the top of Furzy Cliff, showing the Riviera Hotel.

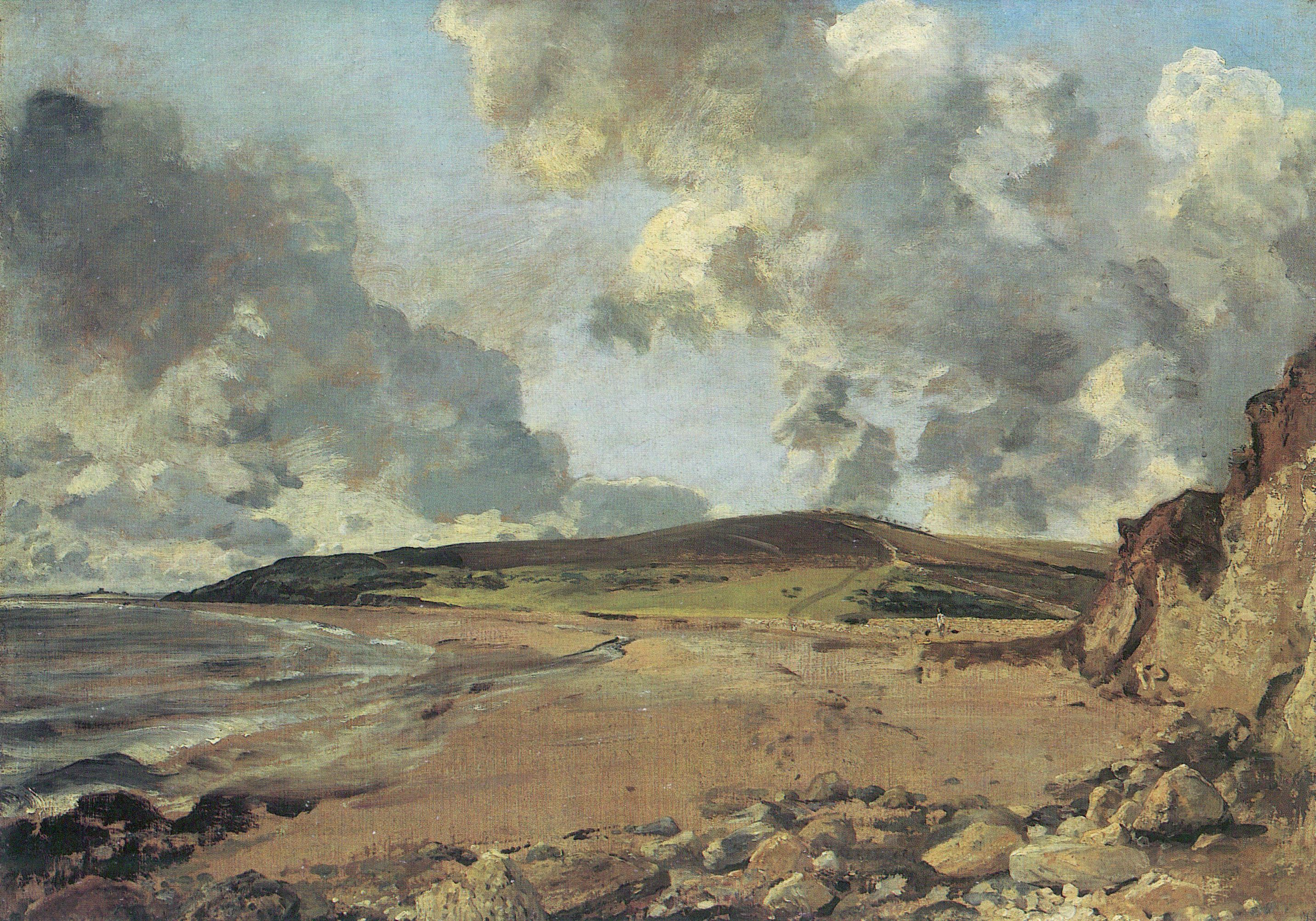
Weymouth Bay: Bowleaze Cove and Jordon Hill, painted by John Constable in 1816–17.

Bowleaze Cove is a small sand and shingle beach, near the village of Preston, just to the northeast of Weymouth, Dorset, England. The cove is on the Jurassic Coast and is known for its geology. Just to the west is Furzy Cliff.

The beach is made up of mainly shingle and shell with some sandy areas. A small pier divides the beach near the River Jordan outflow. The remains of Jordan Hill Roman Temple are located on Jordan Hill, leading down to Bowleaze. The hill figure of the Osmington White Horse can be seen.

A coastal cliff walk leads eastwards from Bowleaze, passing the Broadrock cliffs, Redcliff Point, and thence to Osmington Mills.

== In culture ==
In 1816–17, the artist John Constable painted Weymouth Bay: Bowleaze Cove and Jordon Hill while on his honeymoon. The painting is now in the National Gallery, London.

== Commerce ==
The Riviera Hotel, a Grade II listed Spanish-style 1930s building is on the cove.

The Fantasy Island Funfair is there.
