= Jordan Hill Roman Temple =

Archaeological site in Dorset, Dorset, England, UK

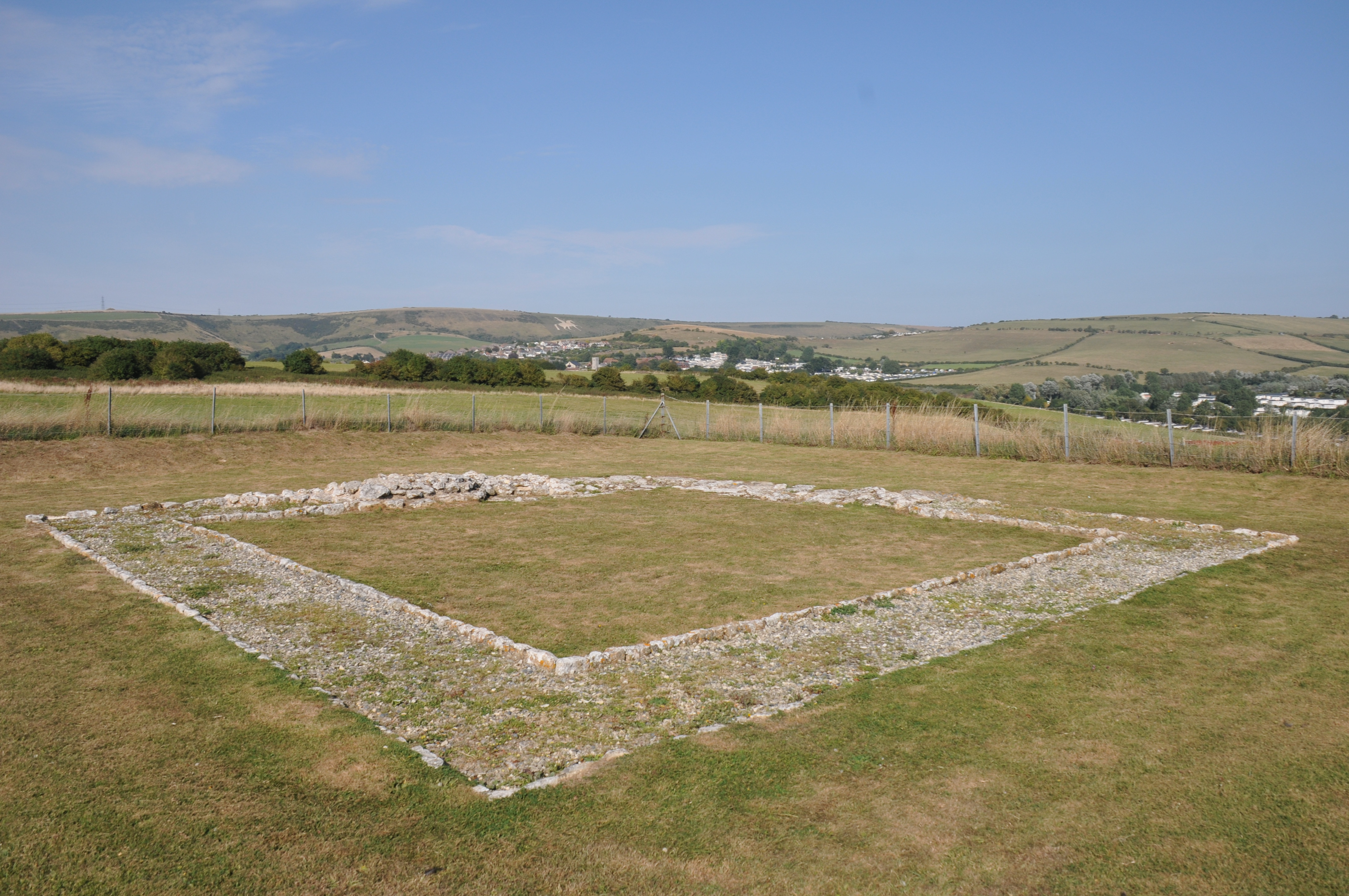
- A view of Jordan Hill Roman Temple

- Map showing the location of Jordan Hill Roman Temple in Dorset.
- 50.637547°N 2.4271160°W
- Type: Romano-Celtic temple
- Cultures: Romano-British
- Location: Preston, Weymouth, Dorset

History
- Built: AD 69–79
- Abandoned: 350–400

Site notes
- Area: Cella: 6.8 m^{2} (73 sq ft); Temenos: 84 m^{2} (900 sq ft)
- Owner: English Heritage
- Management: English Heritage
- Public access: Open any reasonable time during daylight hours
- Website: https://www.english-heritage.org.uk/visit/places/jordan-hill-roman-temple/

Scheduled monument
- Official name: Romano-Celtic temple and associated remains at Jordan Hill
- Designated: 08 October 1981

Jordan Hill Roman Temple is a Romano-Celtic temple and Roman ruin situated on Jordan Hill above Bowleaze Cove in the eastern suburbs of Weymouth in Dorset, England. Original amateur archaeological excavations on the site were carried out by J. Medhurst in 1843-6. These were followed by excavations by C.D. Drew and C.S. Prideaux during 1931-32 suggesting that the site was in operation between c. AD 69–79 to the late 4th century. Some of the finds from the excavations in the 1930s are in the Dorset Museum and the British Museum. There are other Roman sites nearby including Preston Roman Villa to the north west.

== Temple ==
This is a Romano-British type temple, with a square-plan building situated within a courtyard or precinct. The floorplan of the temple measured 6.8 square metres (73 sq ft). The surrounding precinct measured 84 square metres (900 sq ft) and contained numerous deposits of animal bones, ceramics, and coins. The site may also have served as a late 4th-century signal station. The temple does not have an ambulatory but this is probably due to stone robbing. The site also includes a cemetery containing both cremations and inhumations.

== Preservation and public access ==
The site was entrusted into the care of the State in 1933 initially cared for by the Ministry of Works and now in the guardianship of English Heritage who open it to the public with free access. The site was designated a Scheduled Monument in 1981. There are views from the site across Bowleaze Cove.

== See also ==
- The nearby Osmington White Horse
- Religion in ancient Rome
- Roman Temple
- Romano-Celtic Temple

== Bibliography ==
- Ministry of Works, 1952. Ancient Monuments of Southern England. London: HMSO.
- Rev. E.V. Tanner, 1969. Romano-Celtic Settlement on Jordan Hill near Weymouth, Dorset
- Woodward, A. 1992. Shrines and Sacrifice (English Heritage). London: Batsford. pp79
