= Weymouth Bay =

Bay in Dorset, England

Coordinates: 50°37′N 2°25′W

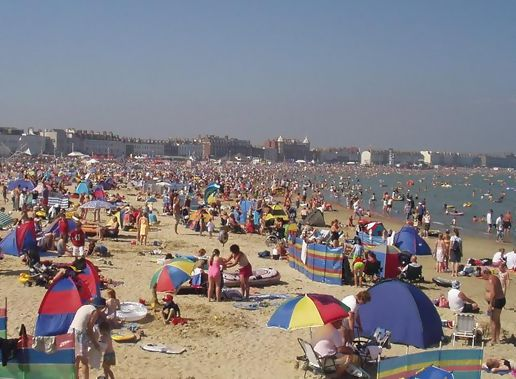
Weymouth Beach — one of the beaches that border Weymouth Bay.

Weymouth Bay is a sheltered bay on the south coast of England, in Dorset. It is protected from erosion by Chesil Beach and the Isle of Portland, and includes several beaches, notably Weymouth Beach, a gently curving arc of golden sand which stretches from the resort of Weymouth. Weymouth Bay is situated approximately halfway along the UNESCO Jurassic Coast World Heritage Site.

== Boundary ==
When Natural England looked at access to Weymouth Bay prior to the 2012 Olympic Games, they defined it as the stretch between Rufus Castle on the Isle of Portland and Lulworth Cove, an area which covers Portland Harbour, Weymouth Beach, and Ringstead Bay.

== Sailing ==
The bay's waters are excellent for sailing — the best sailing waters in northern Europe, in part because the bay is sheltered from south-west winds. This means that Portland Bill can be accessed easily from anywhere on Weymouth Bay by sailing when the tide is turning as an eddy flows along Portland's eastern side.

The bay is home to the Weymouth and Portland National Sailing Academy and hosted the sailing events for the 2012 Olympic Games. Since the games, the Academy's venue has continued to improve to ensure a "legacy" for the Olympic Games.

== Painting ==
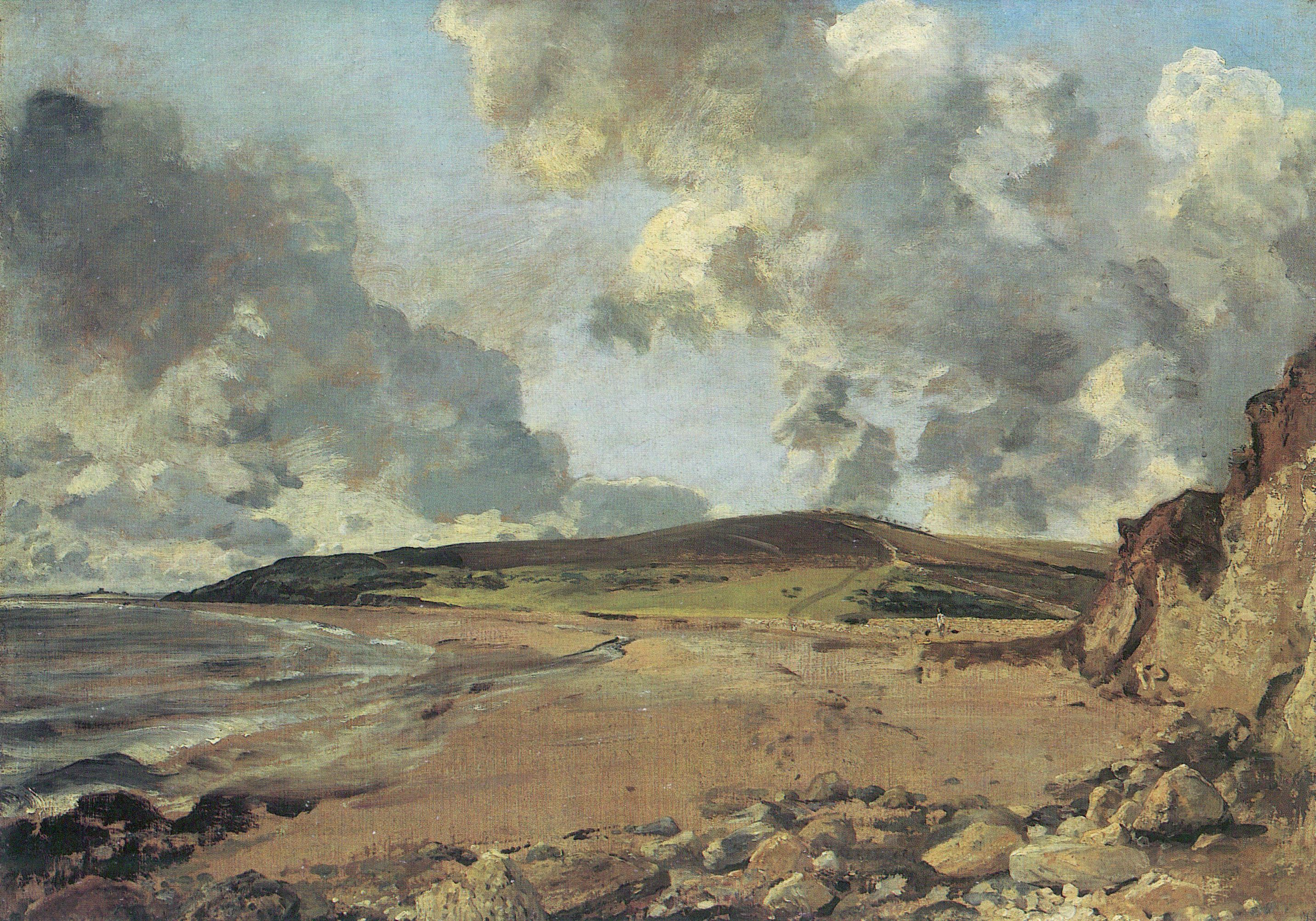
Weymouth Bay: Bowleaze Cove and Jordon Hill by John Constable (1816–17).

Weymouth Bay: Bowleaze Cove and Jordon Hill was painted by the leading English landscape artist John Constable in 1816–17. Constable had honeymooned on the south coast in October 1816, inspiring the painting. The painting now hangs in the National Gallery, London.
