= Preston, Dorset =

Village in Dorset, England

Coordinates: 50°38′45″N 2°25′25″W

Preston
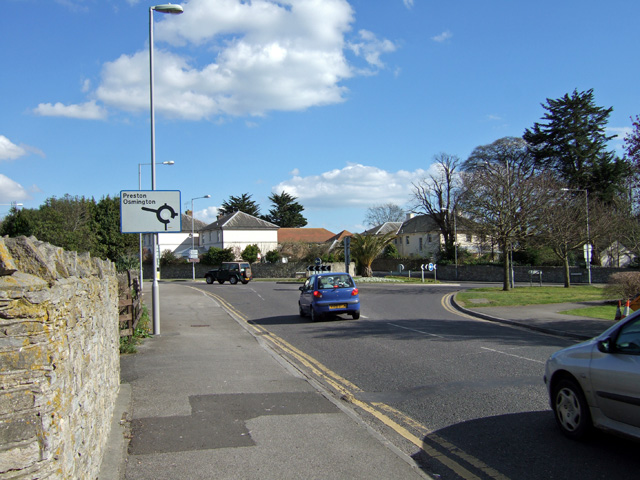
- A354 Roundabout

- Location within Dorset
- Civil parish: Weymouth
- Unitary authority: Dorset
- Ceremonial county: Dorset
- Region: South West
- Country: England
- Sovereign state: United Kingdom

Preston is a coastal village and suburb of Weymouth in south Dorset, England. It is approximately 3 kilometres (2 mi) north-east of Weymouth town centre and 2 kilometres (1 mi) west of the village of Osmington.

Preston contains two Haven campsites, Seaview and Weymouth Bay. It is home to a 14th-century church, St Andrew's, which was built on the site of a much earlier Norman church. It has three public houses: The Bridge Inn (formerly called The Swan), The Spice Ship and The Springhead. On the coast is the beach resort of Bowleaze Cove.

Preston has a village hall, used for many local groups including the local pantomime group.

Since 2019 Preston has been represented by Cllr Tony Ferrari (Conservative) and Cllr Louie O'Leary on Dorset Council as part of the Littlemoor and Preston ward. On 6 November 2023, councillor Tony Ferrari died after collapsing while running.

In 1931 the civil parish had a population of 855. On 1 April 1933 the parish was abolished and merged with Weymouth, Bincombe and Poxwell.

== Notable people ==
The Wesley family (the founders of Methodism) lived at Manor Cottage, which lies just south of The Spice Ship.
