= Weymouth Museum =

Local museum in Weymouth, Dorset, England

Coordinates: 50.6055°N 2.4525°W

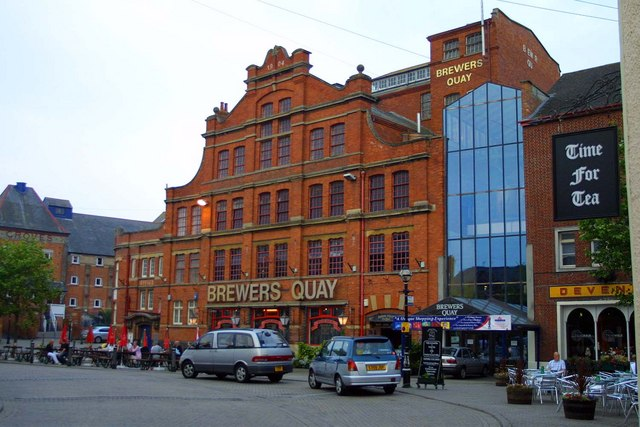
Brewers Quay has been the home of Weymouth Museum since 1990.

Weymouth Museum is a museum in Weymouth, Dorset, England. It was established in 1972 in the former Melcombe Regis Boys' School at Westham Road and moved to Brewers Quay, on the south side of Hope Square near Weymouth Harbour, in 1990. Although the building remains the museum's permanent home, it is currently closed as Brewers Quay is being redeveloped.

== History ==
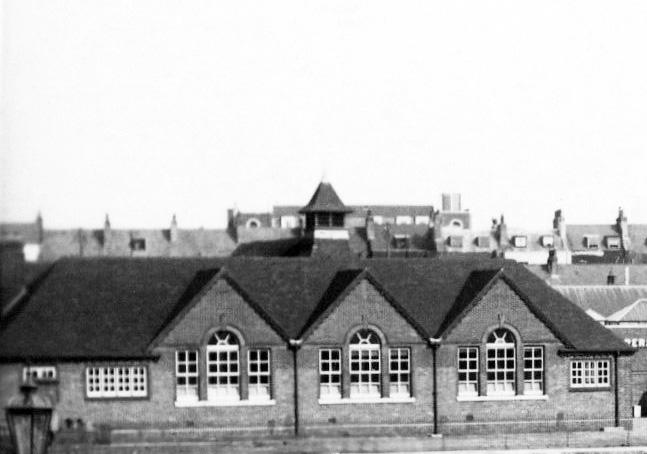
The Melcombe Regis Boys' School, later the home of Weymouth Museum between 1972 and 1989.

The Weymouth Museum of Local History was established in 1972 in the former Melcombe Regis Boys' School at Westham Road. In 1971, the former school was used to hold a temporary exhibition celebrating the 400th anniversary of the union of the towns of Weymouth and Melcombe Regis. The following year saw the opening of a permanent museum in the building. It had five permanent exhibition spaces covering the history of the town in chronological order and a sixth space for temporary exhibits.

In 1987, the museum building was earmarked for demolition as part of plans for the area's redevelopment, including the forming of Weymouth Marina from part of the harbour. Following a period of uncertainty after its closure in 1989, the museum relocated to Brewers Quay, the former Devenish Brewery building that was in the process of being transformed into an indoor shopping complex by Devenish and Weymouth & Portland Borough Council. A 25 year agreement was signed by the Friends of Weymouth Museum and the museum's collection was moved to the new location.

Brewers Quay opened in June 1990 and Weymouth Museum initially operated alongside the Timewalk exhibition, which took visitors on a journey covering the town's history and maritime connections from the 14th century onwards. The museum later separated from the exhibition in 1999 so that it could be converted into a charitable trust, and re-opened in 2000. However, as Brewers Quay had been suffering operational losses since its opening, a succession of new owners of the building disrupted the museum's plans. Brewers Quay was sold to a local investment group, Brewers Quay Investment LLP, in 2010, and the building then closed for redevelopment. Space was set to be retained for the museum, however the new owners ultimately decided that their plans were not viable. Brewers Quay reopened primarily as an antiques emporium in 2013, which saw temporary space provided for the museum, which re-opened in December that year.

Weymouth Museum closed again in 2016, with the Brewers Quay emporium closing in 2017. In January 2016, Weymouth and Portland Borough Council gave approval of Weymouth Museum Trust's plans to relocate and expand the museum within Brewers Quay as part of the building's wider redevelopment project. The trust revealed its intentions to gain some of the estimated £300,000 project cost from the Heritage Lottery Fund, while the council pledged £94,000. In March 2018, the museum reopened using temporary exhibitions to display a small proportion of its collection within Brewers Quay. The £300,000 redevelopment project was expected to be completed for a 2020 opening, but the plans stalled.

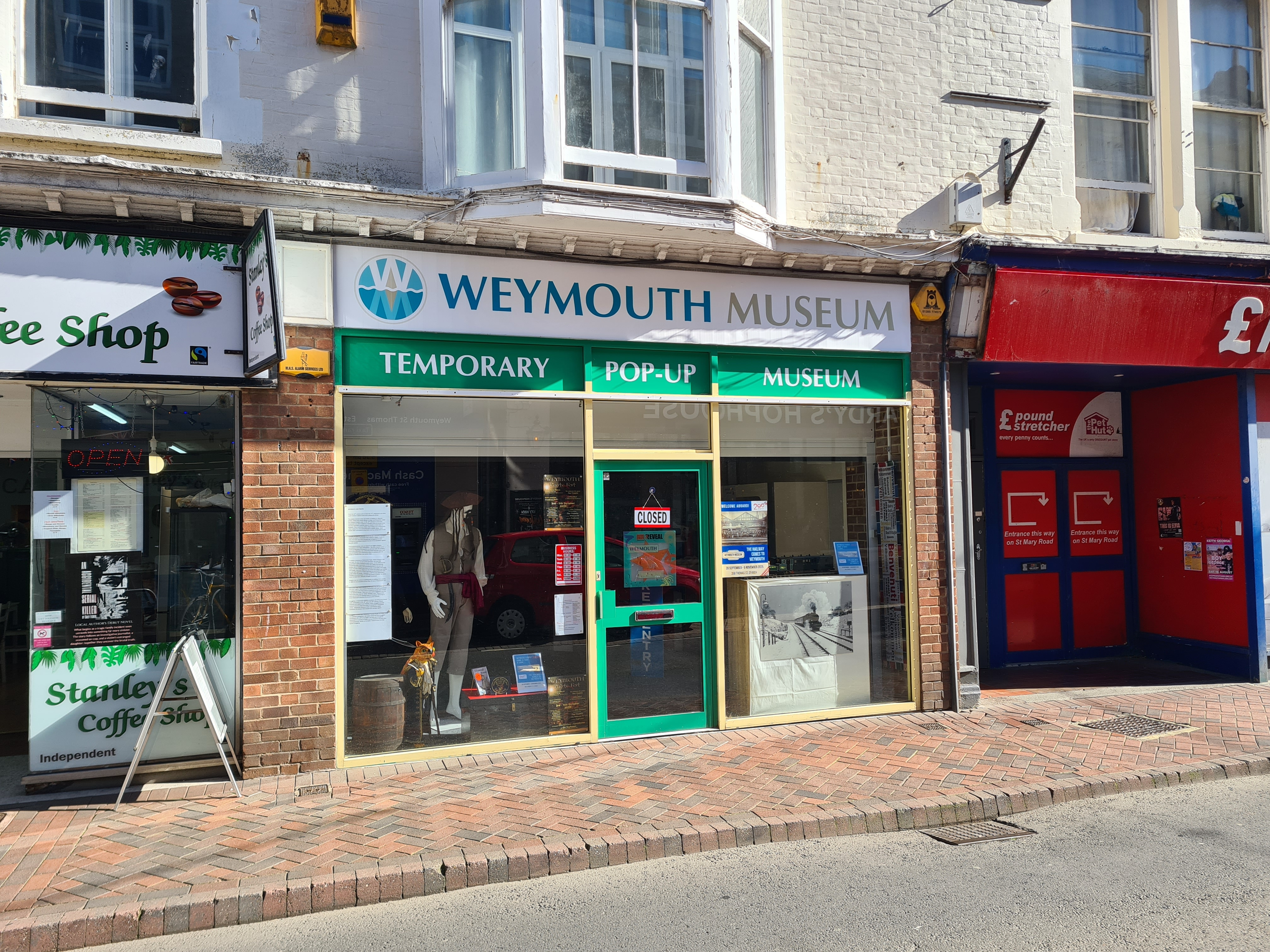
The second temporary pop-up Weymouth Museum in St Thomas Street, opened in 2025.

On 30 May 2022, a temporary pop-up shop museum and gift shop was opened in St Thomas Street and remained in use until 27 October 2023. A new pop-up museum opened in a nearby unit in summer 2025. The redevelopment of Brewers Quay, which commenced in 2024, is due to be completed in 2026, with space reserved for the museum on the ground floor.

== See also ==
- Tudor House Museum
