= Nothe =

Nothe, meaning "nose" may refer to the following places in Dorset, England:

- Nothe Gardens
- Nothe Fort
- Nothe Parade
- Nothe Point
- White Nothe

== See also ==
- Nothe Grits, a Jurassic geological formation in England
- Christopher Nöthe (born 1988), a German professional footballer
