= Nothe Parade =

Street in Weymouth, Dorset, England

Coordinates: 50.607086°N 2.451231°W

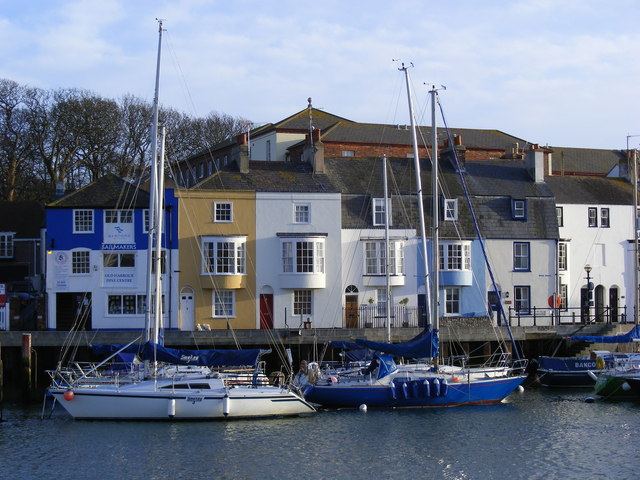
Nothe Parade on the south Weymouth Harbour front, with Wellington Court behind

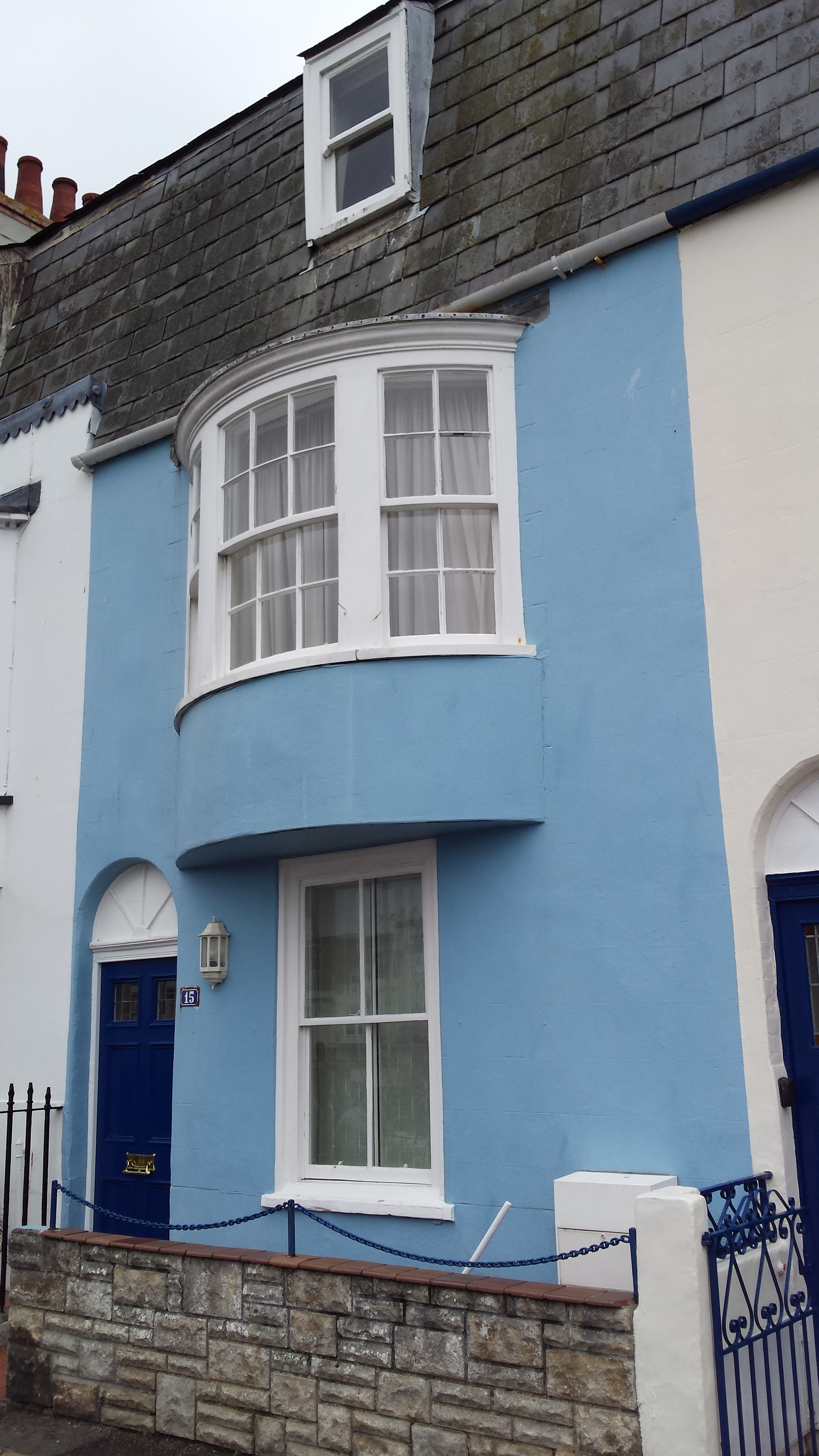
A typical cottage in Nothe Parade, with a characteristic bow-fronted window

Nothe Parade is a waterfront street on the south side of Weymouth Harbour in the seaside town of Weymouth, Dorset, southern England. The waterfront dates from the 17th-century, but most of the cottages in Nothe Parade date from the 19th century. Nothe Parade was formerly known as Nothe Walk before it was developed.

The Royal National Lifeboat Institution (RNLI) Weymouth Lifeboat Station is located here, one of the RNLI's busiest lifeboat stations. The Weymouth Sailing Club and the Weymouth Rowing Club, established in 2000, also operate from here.

Above Nothe Parade are Wellington Court, a former barracks built in 1801, and the adjoining Weymouth Peace Garden. Further along to the east is are Nothe Gardens with Nothe Fort at the end of the promontory. Brewers Quay in Hope Square is a converted Victorian brewery near Nothe Parade, formerly the Devenish Brewery. Also nearby is the Tudor House Museum, which used to front onto the harbour before the land in front of it was reclaimed. Opposite across the harbour is the Weymouth Pavilion, opened in 1908.

Nothe Parade is in a conservation area and is mentioned extensively in the Weymouth Town Centre Conservation Area Character Appraisal. The following individual listed buildings are mentioned explicitly:

- 2 Nothe Parade, an imposing three storey house with excellent brickwork and a generous first floor canted bay;
- Slipmaster’s House, 10A–C Nothe Parade, pleasant detailing and social historical value, important part of a wider group around the former Ayles Slip

== See also ==
- The Esplanade, Weymouth
