= Weymouth Peace Garden =

Coordinates: 50.60644°N 2.45035°W

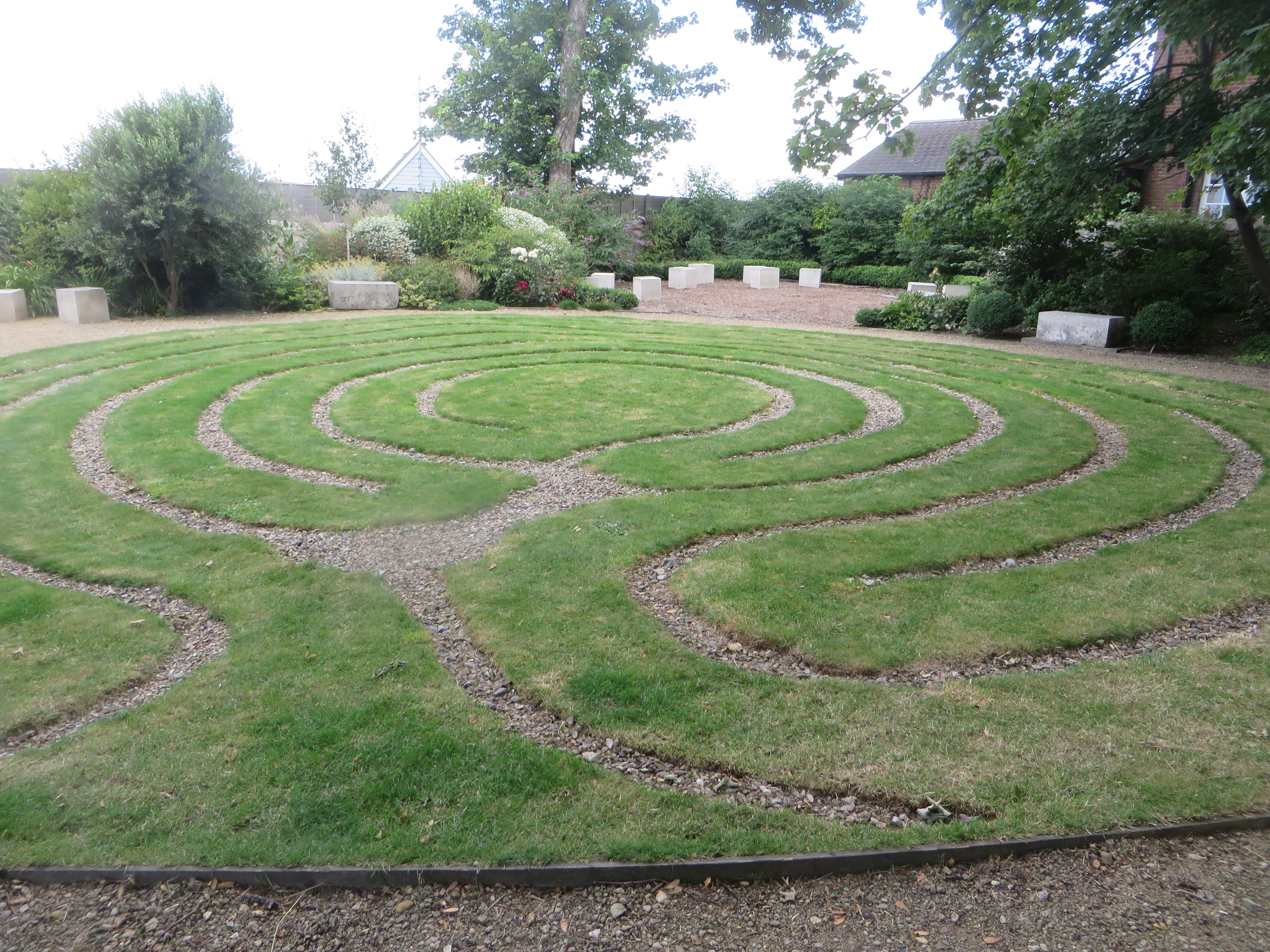
Labyrinth path in Weymouth Peace Garden

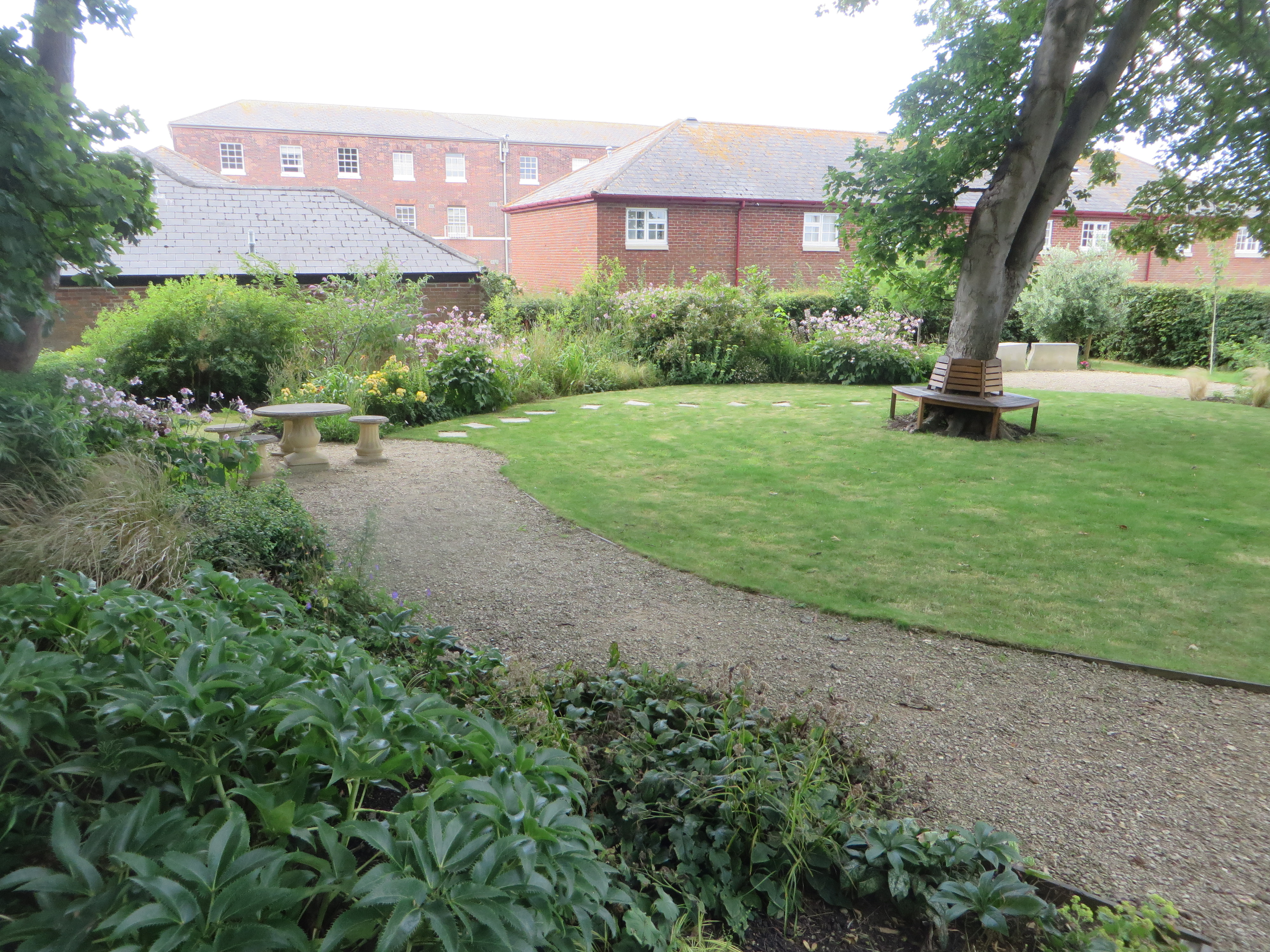
View in Weymouth Peace Garden with barracks behind

Weymouth Peace Garden is garden dedicated to peace in the seaside town of Weymouth in Dorset, southern England.

The Peace Garden is a multifaith community garden. It located to the south of Weymouth Harbour, close to Nothe Gardens and Nothe Fort. Immediately adjacent to the garden is Wellington Court, formerly Red Barracks.

The garden was opened on 24 April 2010 on the site of a former Quaker burial ground.

== See also ==
- Hope Square
- Nothe Parade
