= The Warehouse Theatre =

Theatre in Weymouth, Dorset, England

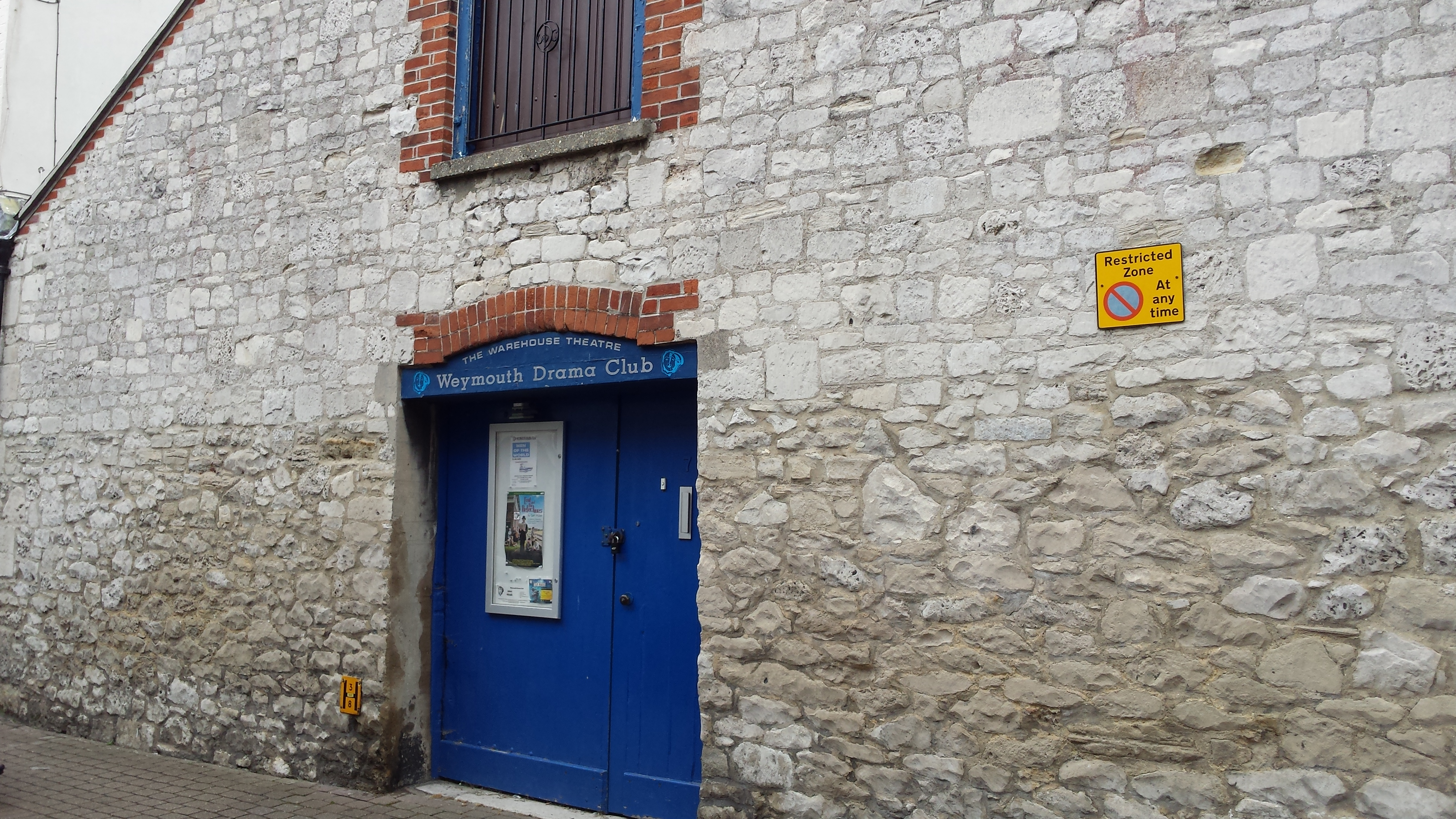
View of The Warehouse Theatre building

The Warehouse Theatre, located in Hope Street, Weymouth, Dorset, England, has been home to the Weymouth Drama Club since 1993. The Drama Club owns and runs the property, which is primarily used for rehearsing forthcoming productions, although it also includes:

- A workshop for building theatre sets
- An extensive costume and props store
- A conference meeting room
- Lighting and sound facilities
- A kitchen

== History ==
The Warehouse Theatre building started out in the 1930s as the main coal storage for the local Devenish Brewery, located in Hope Square, Weymouth.

When the brewery stopped mass-brewing in 1990, the building was redundant until the Weymouth Drama Club started using it as a theatrical facility in 1993. After cleaning, the space was made available for rehearsal and now holds an extensive costume store that is available for hire to the public, as well as a props store, workshop, and lighting and sound facilities.

The building is available for hire to local customers, but is primarily used for rehearsing forthcoming Drama Club productions. Although the organization is an Amateur Dramatic one, professionals also lend their advice and skills. Several social events occur each month.

The Club strives to maintain the original character of the building while maintaining an up-to-date multi-purpose facility. Fundraising events are held at the Warehouse to maintain the upkeep of the space, and also to fund the Drama Club's productions. The club recently completed a campaign to buy new seating for productions. This is mainly due to Friends of the Club.

== Past productions ==
In 1997, the club decided to start using the Warehouse Theatre for main productions as well as the Weymouth Pavilion.

The following is a list of the productions that have taken place at the Warehouse Theatre:

1997

- Pride And Prejudice

1998

- Billy Liar
- Passion Killers

1999

- Victoriana
- Stepping Out

2000

- Anyone For Breakfast
- The Ghost Train

2001

- The Weekend
- Blithe Spirit

2002

- The Business Of Murder
- Murder In Play

2003

- Unleashed
- Herbal Bed

2004

- Unoriginal Sin
- Wyrd Sisters
- Love Begins At 50

2005

- The Enquiry

2006

- An Inspector Calls

2007

- Jeffrey Bernard Is Unwell
- Death Becomes Us
- Inspector Drake & The Perfeckt Crime

2008

- Stones in His Pockets

== See also ==
- Weymouth Pavilion
