= Verne Heavy Anti-Aircraft Battery =

Coordinates: 50.5566°N 2.4344°W

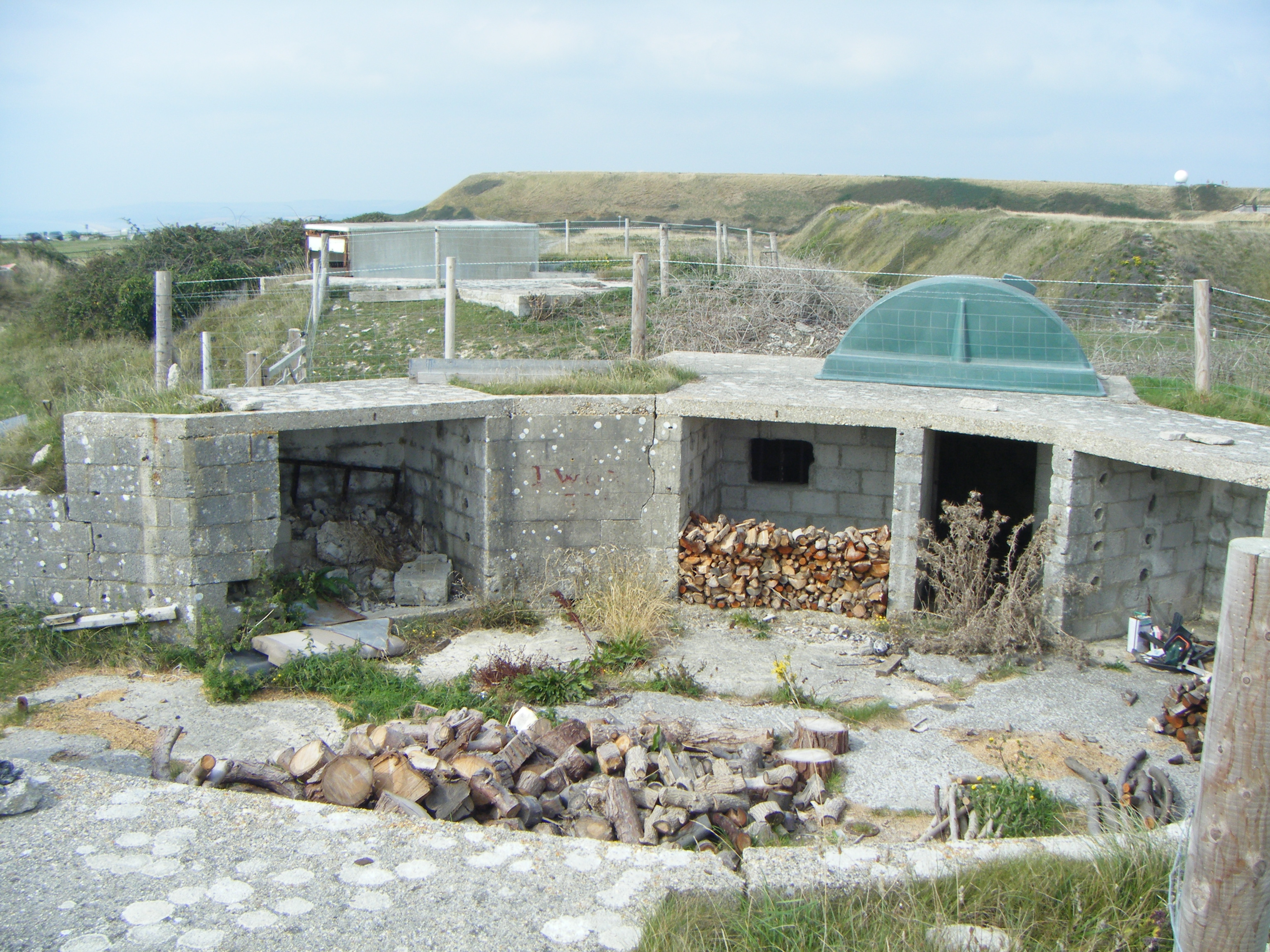
One of the four circular 1942 gun emplacements of the Verne HAA Battery.

Verne Heavy Anti-Aircraft Battery is a World War II anti-aircraft battery on the Isle of Portland, Dorset, England. It is located on private property in the north-east area of the island, south of the Verne Citadel. The battery became a scheduled monument in March 2019.

== History ==
During World War II, Portland's naval base was a primary target for German air raids, prompting a number of heavy anti-aircraft batteries to be built within the region, one of which was located close to the Verne Citadel. Locally designated as "Battery B", other nearby batteries included examples at Blackhead near Weymouth, Barrow Hill near Southwell, and Chickerell, Weymouth.

The Verne battery's operated using QF 3.7-inch AA guns. Manned by personnel of AA Command, the battery's associated Gun Operations Room was based at Red Barracks, Weymouth, and from 1941 at Nottington House, Weymouth. The battery was later fitted with GL Mark II radar from 1942. After the war, the battery survived and was put into use as stables.

== Gallery ==
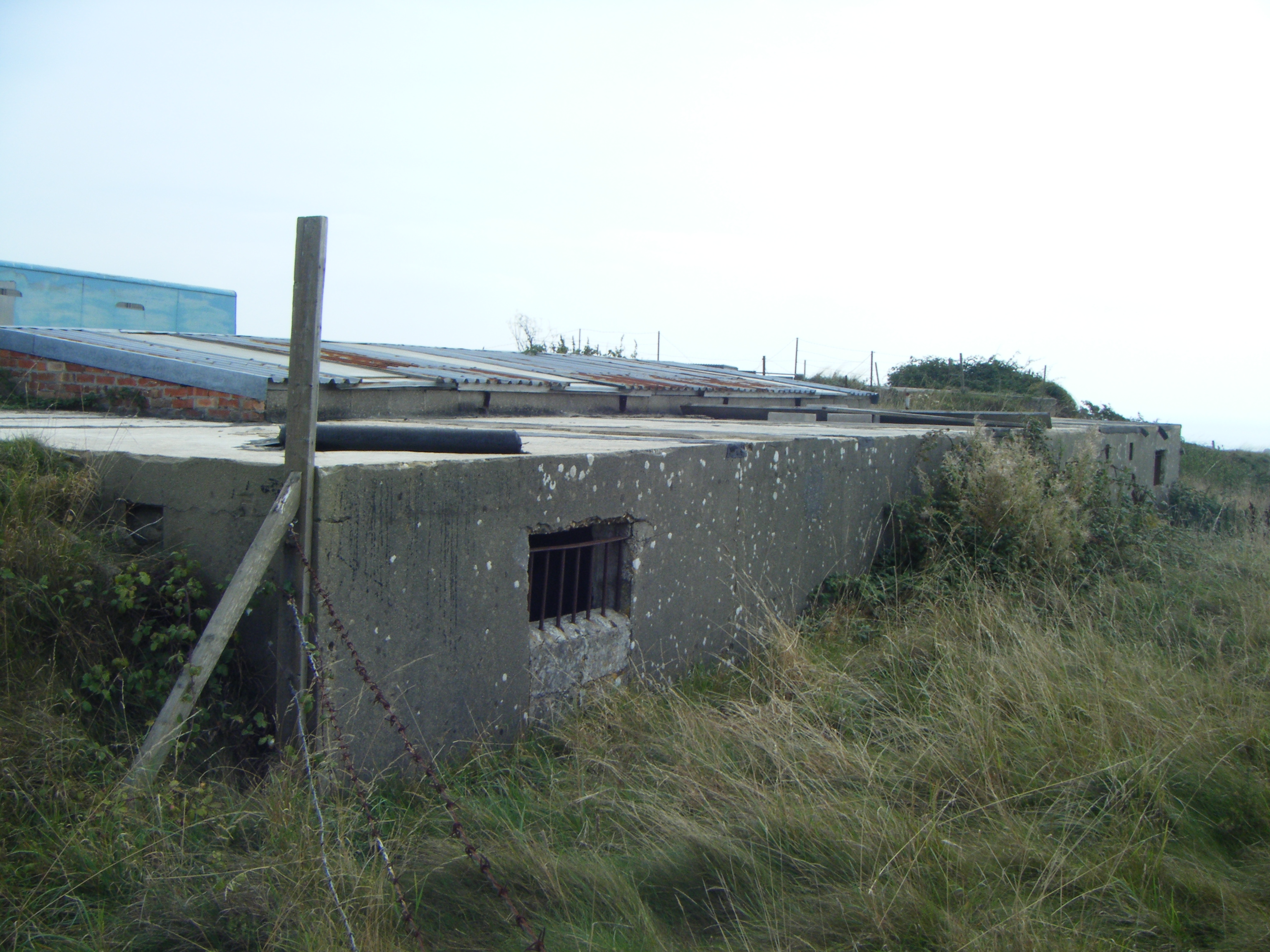
The battery's command bunker.

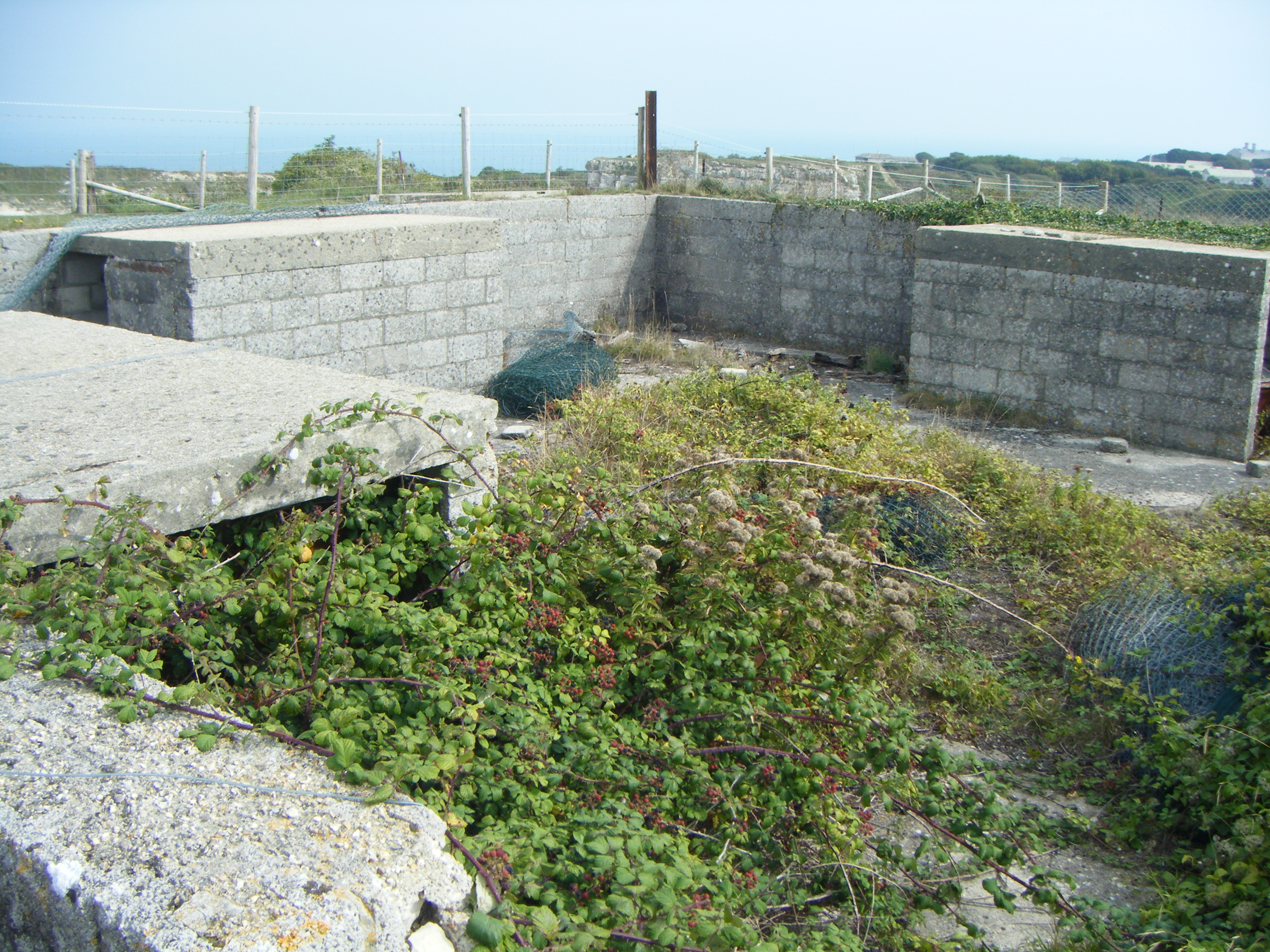
One of two 1944 mobile square emplacements at the battery.

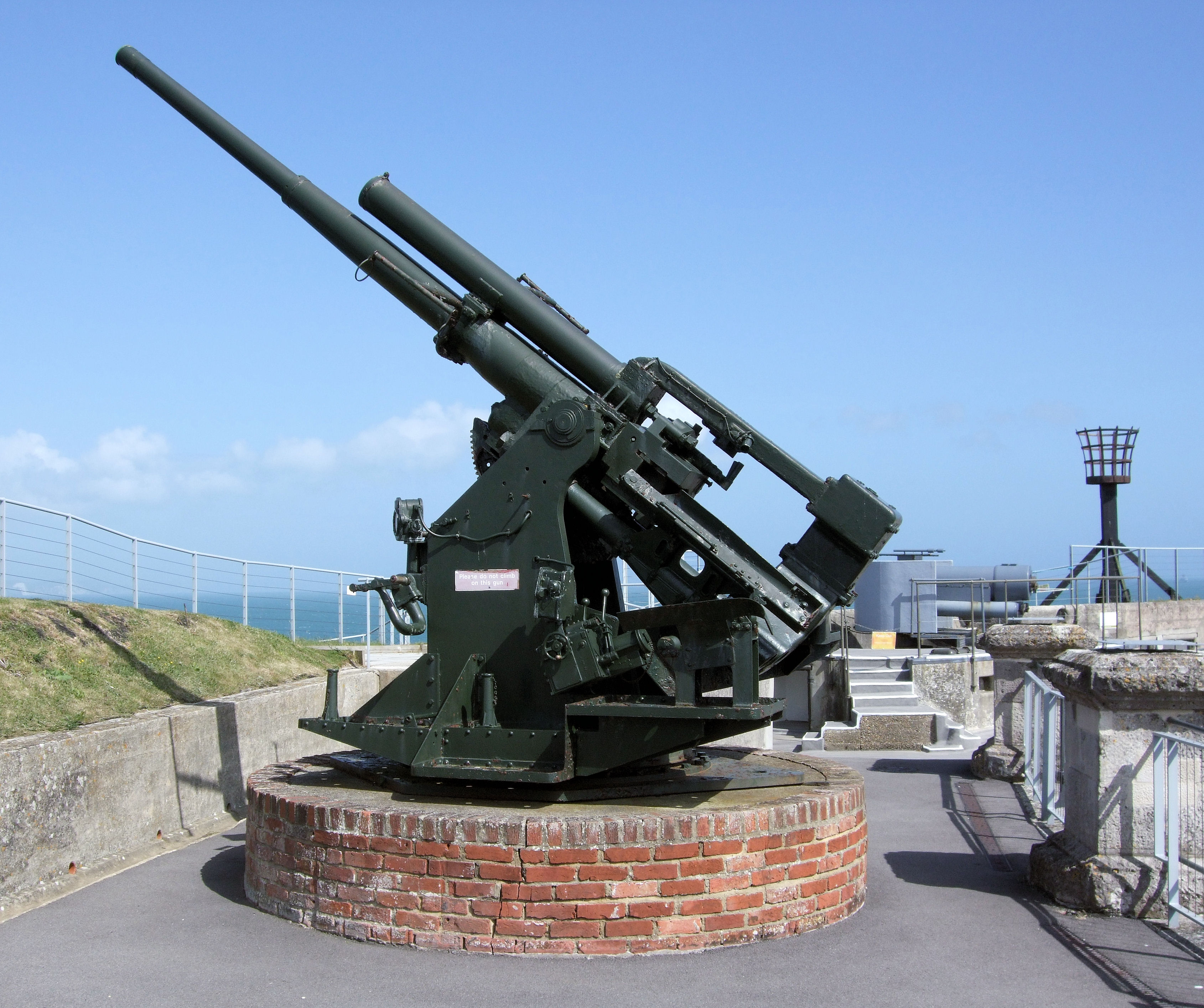
An example of a 3.7 inch AA Gun, seen at the Nothe Fort in Weymouth.
