= Weymouth Harbour, Dorset =

Harbour at Weymouth in Dorset, England

Coordinates: 50°36′27″N 02°27′03″W

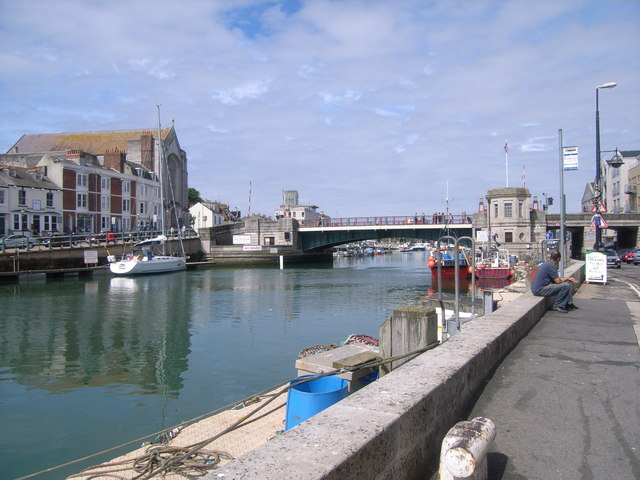
A view of Weymouth Harbour with the town bridge in the distance.

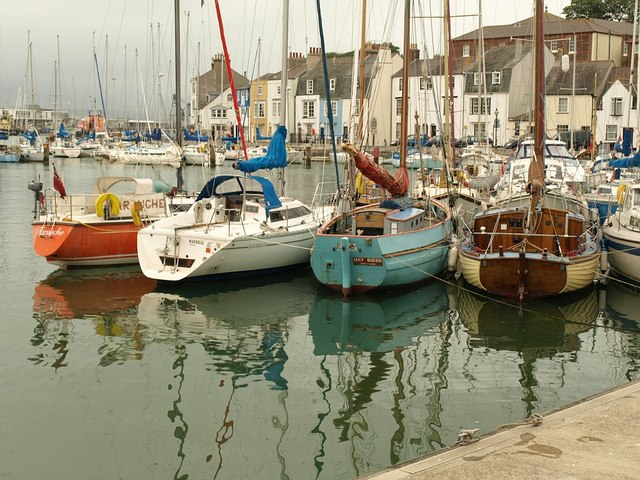
Boats in Weymouth Harbour.

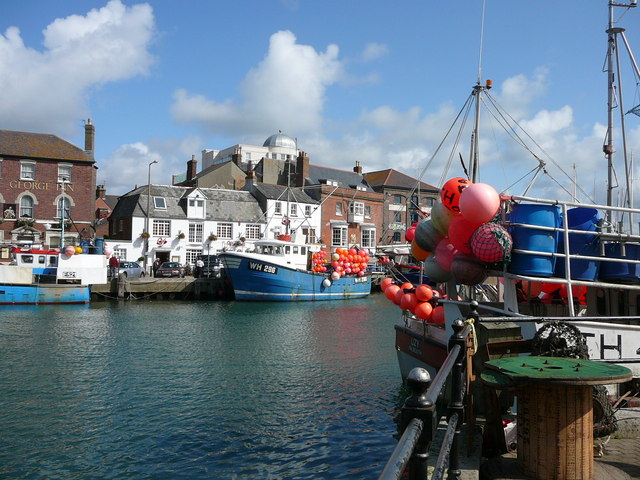
View of the Custom House Quay at Weymouth Harbour.

Weymouth Harbour (or the Old Harbour) is a harbour at the seaside town of Weymouth in Dorset, southern England. It has a 17th-century waterfront.

== Overview ==
The harbour forms the mouth of the River Wey as it enters the English Channel. The original Roman port at Radipole to the north was lost to silting (forming Radipole Lake), and the current harbour further downstream, lying between Weymouth Old Town and Melcombe Regis, started to develop in the 12th and 13th centuries. Weymouth Harbour empties into the much larger Portland Harbour to the south and east, which is home to the Weymouth and Portland National Sailing Academy, where the sailing events of the 2012 Olympic Games and Paralympic Games were held.

Weymouth Harbour has included cross-channel ferries, and is now home to pleasure boats and private yachts. The Weymouth Harbour Tramway ran along the north side of the harbour to the long disused Weymouth Quay railway station. The track was removed during 2020 and 2021 except for two short sections left as a memorial. Immediately to the north at the harbour entrance is Weymouth Pier, separating the harbour from Weymouth Beach and Weymouth Bay. Weymouth Pavilion and the Jurassic Skyline observation tower could be found here before its removal. Stone Pier is located on the south side of the harbour entrance.

Immediately to the south near the entrance to the harbour are Nothe Gardens with Nothe Fort on the promontory. Nothe Parade runs along the south side of the harbour front, with Wellington Court, the former Red Barracks, built in 1801, above. Brewers Quay is a converted Victorian brewery in Hope Square, a tourist spot south of the Old Harbour. It was formerly the Devenish Brewery. Nearby is the Tudor House Museum, which used to front onto the harbour before the land opposite was reclaimed.

The harbour includes a lifting bridge to allow boats into the inner harbour, Weymouth Marina.

== Video ==
Weymouth Harbour on YouTube

== See also ==
- Custom House, Weymouth
- Portland Harbour
- Weymouth Peace Garden
