= Stone Pier =

Coordinates: 50.6088°N 2.4423°W

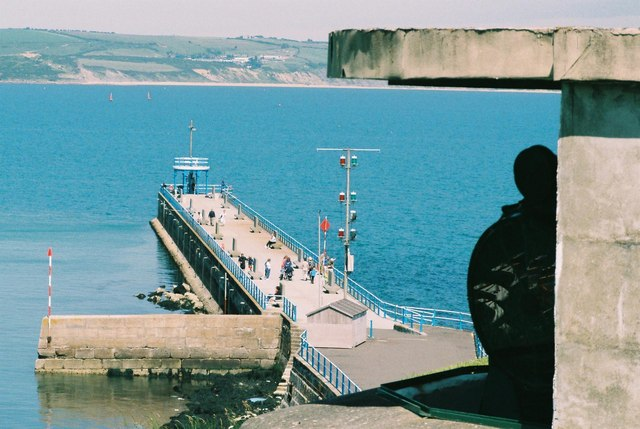
Stone Pier as seen from the Nothe Fort

Stone Pier, also known as South Pier, is a pier located on the southern side of the entrance of Weymouth Harbour, in Dorset, England. It extends out from the Nothe Peninsula, which is the location of the Nothe Fort and Nothe Gardens.

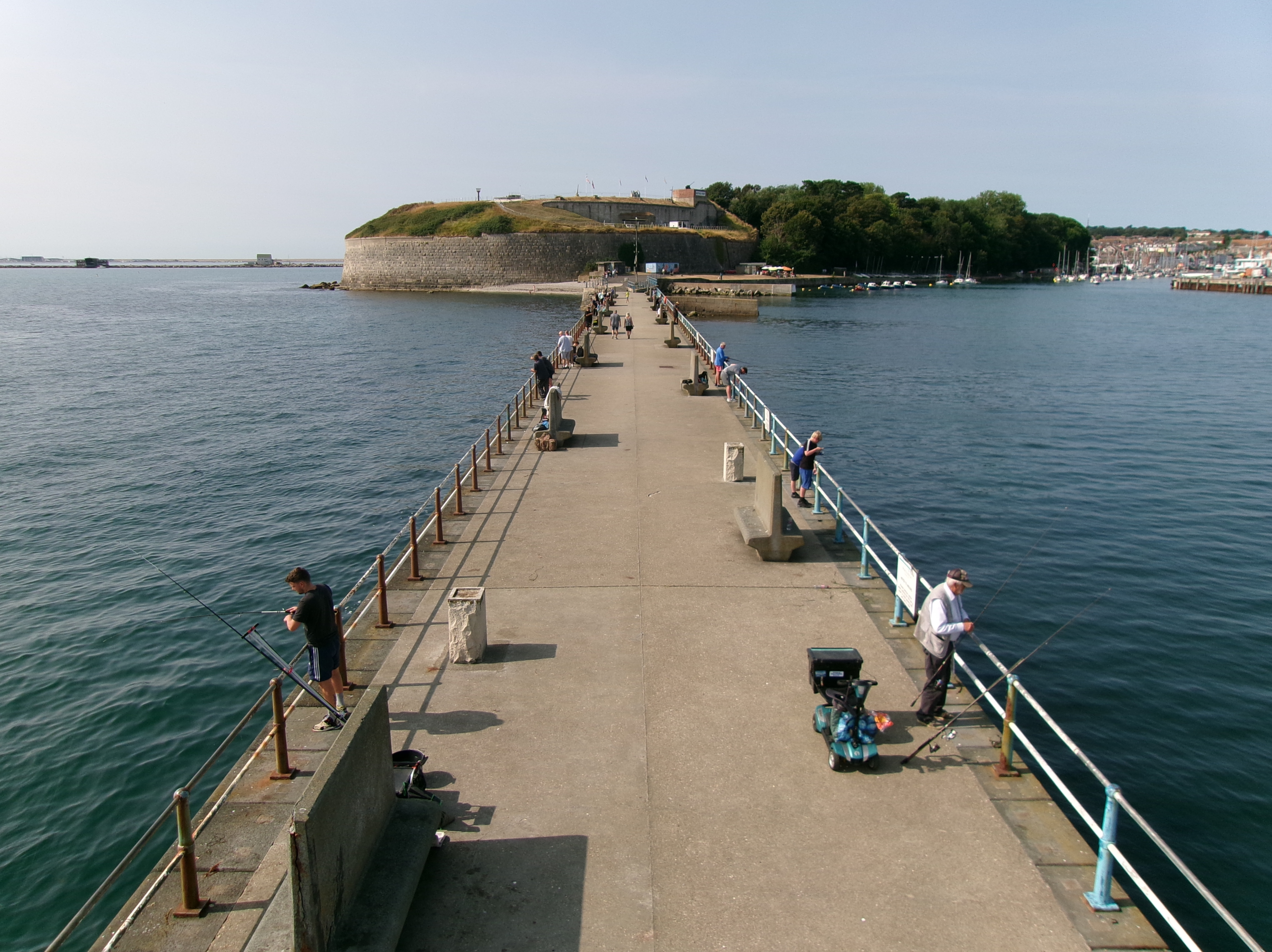
View from the end of the pier towards Nothe Fort

== History ==
The earliest Stone Pier structure dates to at least the early 17th century. One of the earliest maps to depict a pier or breakwater at the entrance of Weymouth Harbour is William Simpson's 1626 map of Weymouth and Portland. The original structure was far shorter than the existing one. During the 19th century, the main pier structure was fronted by loose stones forming a breakwater which continued a further 370 feet. A buoy was placed at the seaward end as the breakwater was covered at times of high tide. The Great Storms of 1824 caused much damage to the pier, resulting in a rebuild. Later in 1876, work was completed on a 250 feet extension to the pier along the breakwater below, which provided greater protection to Weymouth Pier opposite and vessels using the harbour. The pier was extended again in the 1910s, with a tower erected on the end to accommodate a navigational light. Reinforcement works were undertaken in the 1980s following storm damage. Today the pier is a popular place for sea anglers and walkers.
