= Red Barracks =

Red Barracks may refer to:

- Red Barracks, Weymouth
- Red Barracks, Woolwich
