= Timewalk =

Museum in Weymouth, Dorset, England

Coordinates: 50.6055°N 2.4525°W

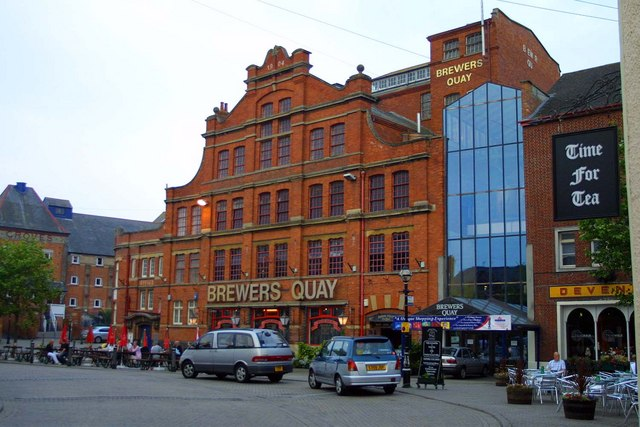
Timewalk was housed in Brewers Quay.

The Timewalk was an exhibition and visitor attraction located in Brewers Quay, Weymouth, Dorset. It opened in 1990 and closed in 2010. One of Weymouth's most popular attractions, Timewalk took visitors on a journey covering the town's history and maritime connections from the 14th century onwards. It was told by the brewery cat, Miss Paws, and her eight feline ancestors. The attraction aimed to "recreate the sights, sounds and smells, of six hundred years of maritime history".

After being introduced to Miss Paws, visitors were taken around a series of nineteen dioramas depicting various historic scenes, including the Black Death pandemic, the Spanish Armada's attempted invasion, the English Civil War, the use of Portland stone by Sir Christopher Wren for the rebuilding of London after the Great Fire of 1666, Weymouth's Royal Patronage by King George III, local smuggling and Weymouth's important tourism trade following its railway link opened in 1857. The final part of the attraction was Brewery Days, which covered the history of brewing in Hope Square from 1821. It featured the characters Mr Malt, Mr Hops and Mr Yeast which were known as the Brewery Bunch. Adults were able to taste some real ale in the Drum and Dancer Tasting Bar.

== History ==
Following the closure of Devenish Brewery, Devenish and Weymouth & Portland Borough Council launched a major plan to transform the building into Brewers Quay, a shopping complex with a pub, restaurant and indoor visitor attractions. Opened in June 1990, the new £4.5 million complex included Timewalk and Weymouth Museum, both of which covered the history of Weymouth. The project designer was John Sunderland, and that year, Timewalk won the British Tourist Authority's "Come to Britain Trophy".

Timewalk was one of the area's most popular attractions and was praised as part of the Rough Guide to Britain's entry for Weymouth in 2004. In a borough report by the council, Timewalk's annual visitor numbers for 2004 was 41,000. In the summer of 2007, VisitBritain announced that Weymouth was the most searched location on their websites, which was said to have been boosted by both Timewalk and the Sea Life Park.

In 2010, Timewalk closed when Brewers Quay shut for redevelopment by Brewers Quay Investment LLP. As part of their plans, it was announced that Timewalk would not be included in the redevelopment, with the attraction being described as "no longer justifiable" due to dwindling visitor numbers. Instead, a new wet weather attraction was announced as its replacement. However, the plans stalled and in 2013, Brewers Quay re-opened as an antiques emporium. Following its closure, the Timewalk figures were placed in storage within the building. In 2016, Weymouth Museum gave 18 figures to the emporium, who retained some while others were sold.
