= Newton's Cove =

Cove in Dorset, England

Coordinates: 50.6037°N 2.4477°W

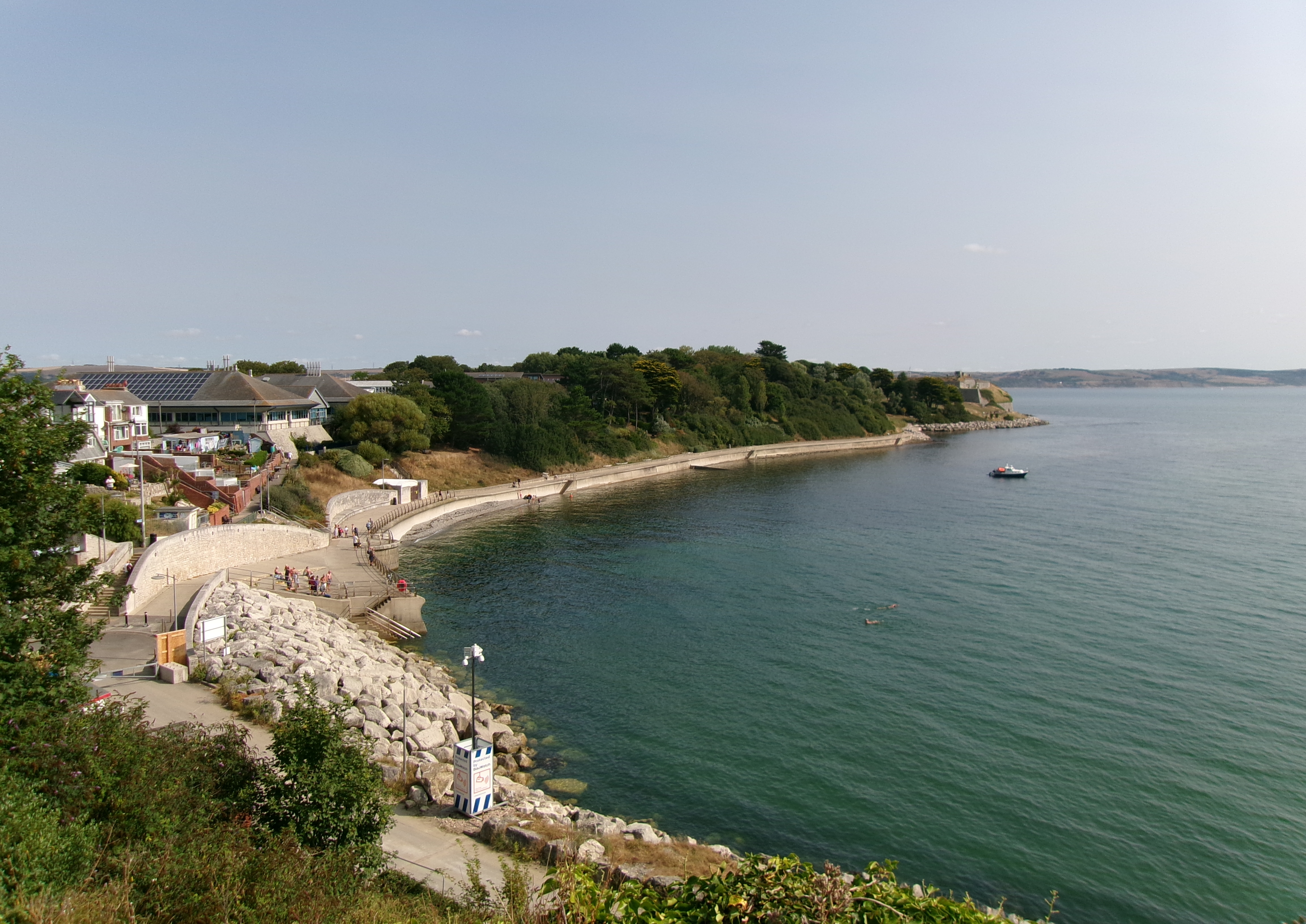
Newton's Cove

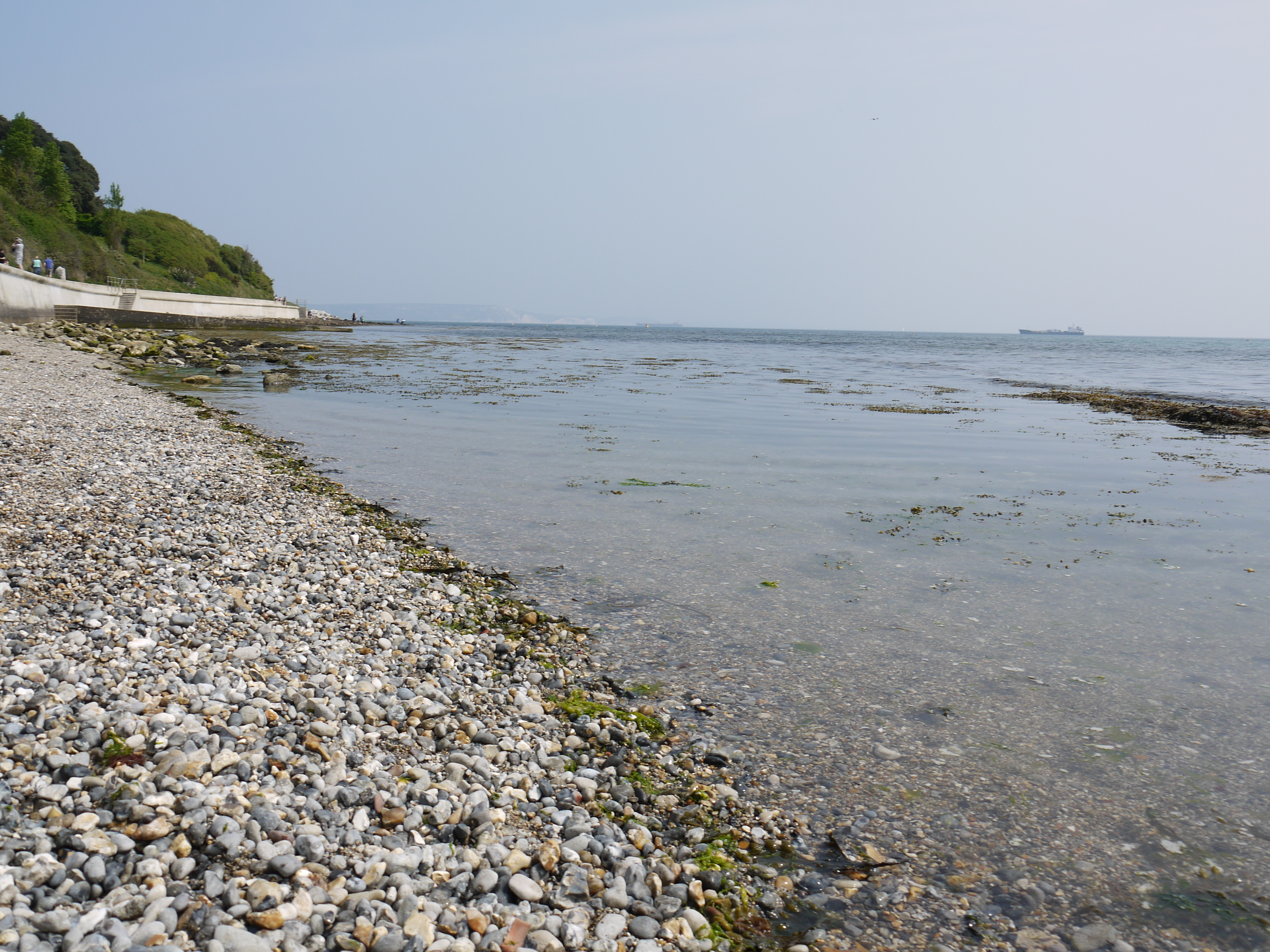
Shore of Newton's Cove

Newton's Cove is a small cove, 0.5 kilometres (0.3 mi) south of Weymouth, Dorset, England. Overlooking Portland Harbour, the cove is close to Nothe Gardens and the Nothe Fort.

== Modern events ==
In 2009, a new bridge was constructed over either side of Newtons Road, after the original 73-year-old concrete bridge was demolished. The Dorset County Council had planned to put in ramps on the banks either side of the road. However, a successful campaign by residents and community groups caused the council to find money in the budget to fund a new structure. The new bridge was designed by artist Chris Tipping, who collaborated with the council's engineering and construction teams.

In 2011, Dorset Wildlife Trust organised an event based in the cove as part of their three-year investigation, which is termed the 'Welly Zone'. Staff from Weymouth Sea Life Park and Dorset Wildlife Trust spent two-and-a-half hours logging plant and animal life they found in the inter-tidal area and rockpools on and around the beach in a bid to win protection for the fragile shoreline and shallow water habitats along the Dorset coastline. The results were indications of climate change as various shells were found seemingly expanding their region along the South West coast, whilst presence of Asia native wireweed was also discovered.

== Newton's Cove Coast Protection Scheme ==
In 2003, a £1.95 million scheme was devised to protect residential property in the area and at the same time safe-guarding and enhancing important local geological environment. Originally damaged from the tide, a new sea wall now provides accessible public right of way.

Landscape architect Enplan, who were inspired by the view across Weymouth Bay of Dorset coast's chalk cliffs, had proposed features that mimic the outline of the facing cliffs of the Bay and the Isle of Portland. The cove's main walls were shaped and curved in two planes and faced in local Portland stone. Afterwards, the area was further enhanced by using architectural lighting and landscape planting to strengthen a contemporary and continental feel for warm summer evening promenading. The judges of the scheme had stated "This scheme represents a vitally important contribution to the defence of the sea wall in Weymouth. But more than that, it is an excellent example of a contemporary promenade with a 'corniche' atmosphere."

The promenade was officially opened on the 29 September 2003 by a local ten year old schoolboy, Joseph Walker of Wyke Regis Jr School, after he won a poetry competition among the local schools. At the opening, he was joined by Weymouth and Portland Mayor Councillor Doug Hollings.

As a result of the scheme's success, Newton's Cove Coast Protection Scheme was a 2004 finalist in the Prime Minister's better public buildings awards.

== See also ==
- List of Dorset beaches
- Jurassic Coast
