= Wellington Court =

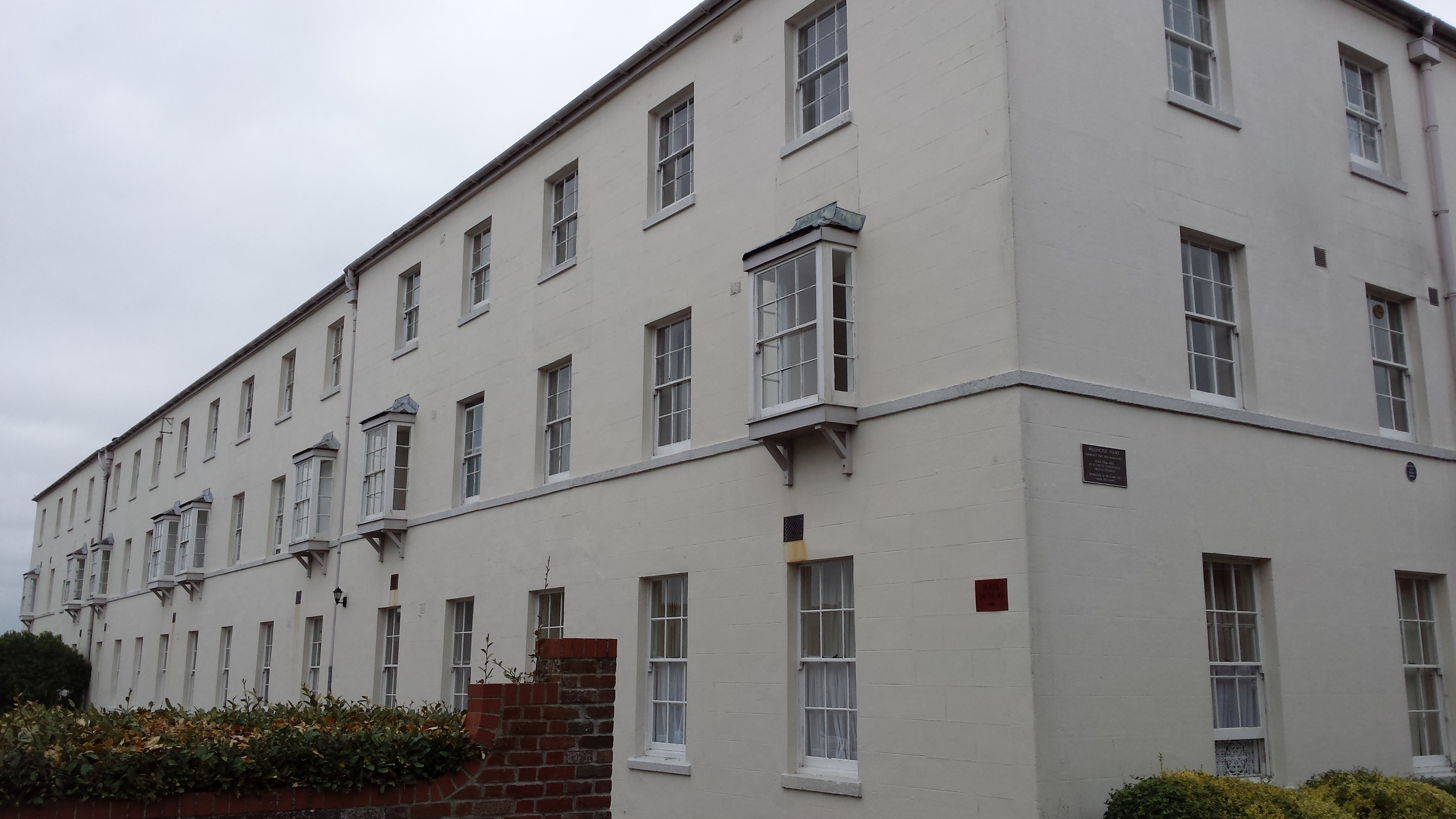
- The main building of Wellington Court, formerly Red Barracks
- Interactive map of the Wellington Court area
- Alternative names: Red Barracks

General information
- Type: Barracks
- Architectural style: Georgian architecture
- Location: Weymouth, Dorset, England
- Coordinates: 50.606044°N 2.451055°W
- Groundbreaking: 1795
- Completed: 1801
- Opened: 1796
- Owner: Private

Technical details
- Structural system: Red brick, part rendered
- Material: Red brick
- Floor count: 3

Design and construction
- Designations: Grade II listed

Listed Building – Grade II
- Official name: Wellington Court
- Reference no.: 1313414

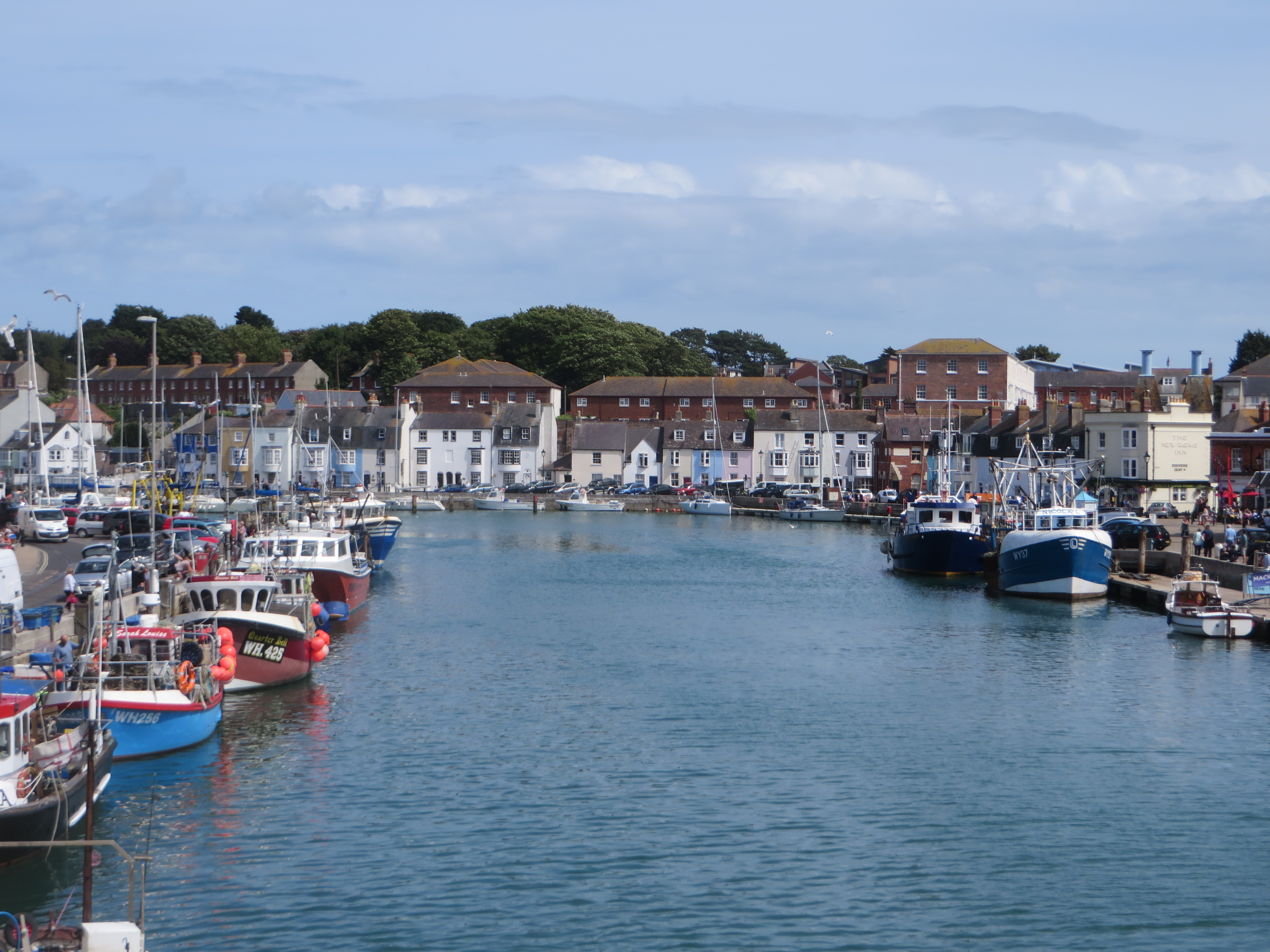
Wellington Court overlooking Weymouth Harbour, above Nothe Parade on the waterfront

Wellington Court (formerly Red Barracks) is a former barracks overlooking Weymouth Harbour in Weymouth, Dorset, England. It has been converted to housing and apartments. The original building is Grade II listed.

== History ==
Red Barracks were first conceived and built as cavalry barracks in 1795–6. The barracks were rebuilt in 1801 around a parade area, following a fire in 1798, and used as infantry barracks, with accommodation for 17 officers and 270 men. There was also a 30-bed hospital. The barracks were built because King George III understood the need to improve Great Britain’s defences against potential invasion by Napoleon’s French troops. The barracks were one of three built in Weymouth. During the Napoleonic Wars, the barracks stationed troops from Hanover.

The main three-story block is to the southwest of where the parade ground was located. It is a long rectangular building with four doorways facing what was the parade ground. There are sash windows.

There is a plan of the barracks dating from 1907 in the UK National Archives. The site was sold in 1984 for subsequent redevelopment as Wellington Court.

The site is located on Barrack Road, which leads to Nothe Fort. Weymouth Peace Garden (formerly a burial ground) is located immediately adjacent to the site and Nothe Gardens are close by to the location.

== See also ==
- Hope Square
- Nothe Parade
