= Brewers Quay =

Historic Victorian landmark in Weymouth, England

Coordinates: 50.6055°N 2.4525°W

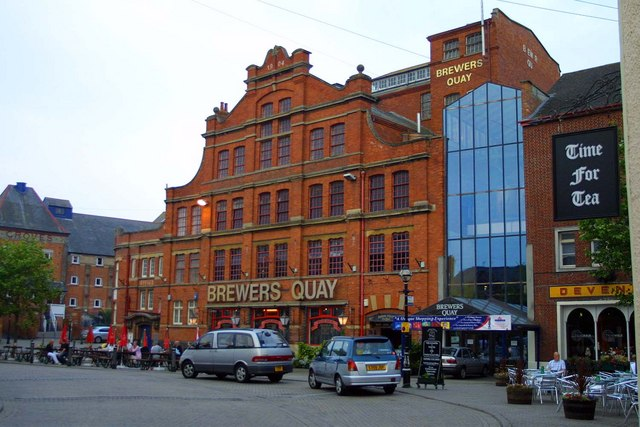
Brewers Quay shopping and heritage centre on Hope Square near the Weymouth harbourside in 2007.

Brewers Quay is a converted Victorian brewery on the south side of Hope Square near the Old Harbour in Weymouth, Dorset, southern England. Much of the complex dates from 1903–04, when it was built as the Hope Brewery for John Groves & Sons Ltd. It was later taken over by Devenish Brewery in 1960 and opened in 1990 as an indoor shopping complex with around twenty specialty shops together with heritage and science exhibits, until it closed in 2010. From 2013-17, the building housed an antiques emporium. It currently awaits redevelopment.

Brewers Quay has been a Grade II listed building since 1974. The building is located at Hope Square, which holds a range of cafes, bars, bistros, while close by is the Tudor House Museum, and facing out to sea is Nothe Fort and its gardens.

== Brewery and conversion into tourist attraction ==
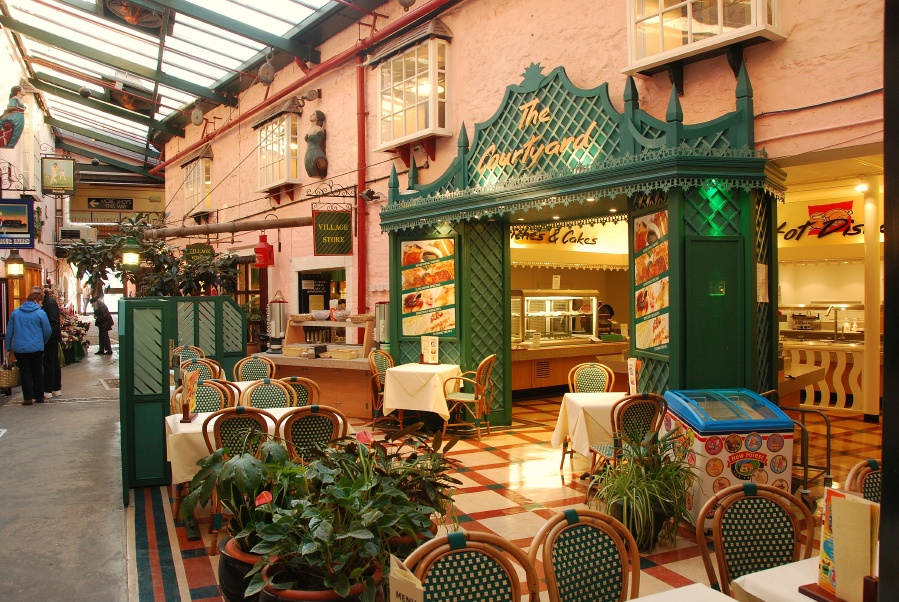
The Courtyard Restaurant of Brewers Quay.

Hope Square had been used for brewing since at least 1252. There was good access to spring water from Chapelhay, while barley fields were located at Radipole. By the 18th century, there were three separate breweries in the area; each being under the ownership of the Flew family, William Devenish and the Davis Brewery. In the early 19th century, the Flew family sold their brewery to Devenish, and in 1960, Groves also sold theirs to Devenish. Devenish continued to produce beer from Brewers Quay until 1985.

Following its closure, Devenish and Weymouth & Portland Borough Council launched a major plan to transform the now-vacant building into a shopping centre with a pub and restaurant. Devenish spent £4.5 million on refurbishing the building. Opened in June 1990, the new complex was hailed as "the Covent Garden of Dorset". The success of Brewers Quay resulted in various awards and commendations, including the Come to Britain Trophy, a Commitment to the Environment Award, a Civic Society award and major commendation from Business and Industry. 100,000 people visited the building in 1990, with the number increasing to 750,000 in 2010. The building also housed the award-winning Timewalk exhibition and Weymouth Museum, and in 1992, a hands-on science centre named Discovery was opened.

== Redevelopment attempts (1990s-2012) ==
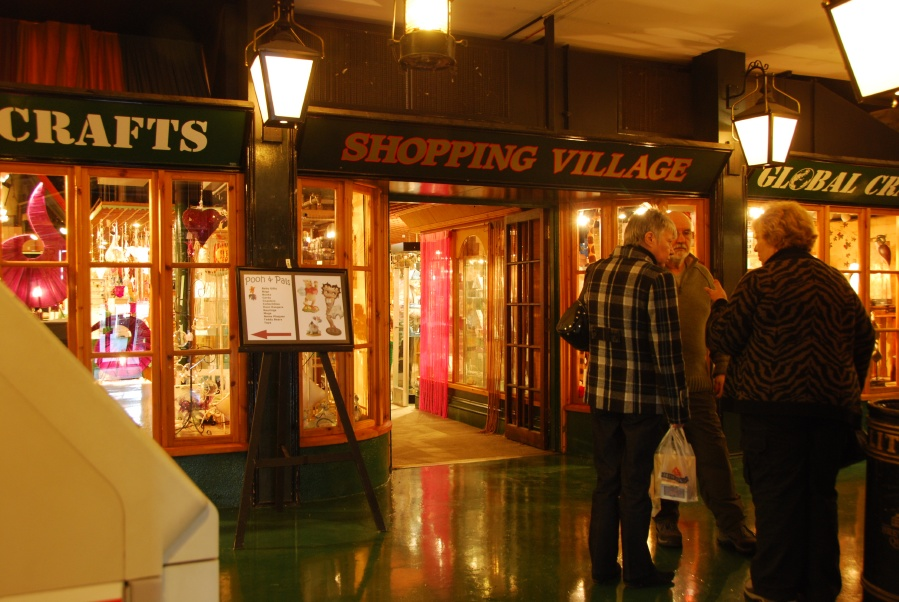
The Shopping Village of Brewers Quay.

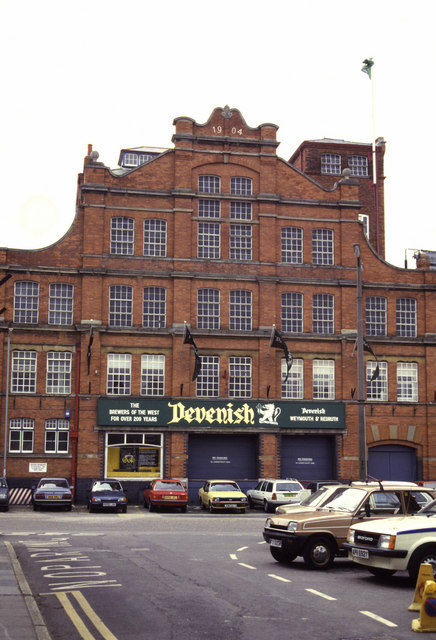
Brewers Quay seen in 1987 when it was the Devenish Brewery.

Plans for residential development at the site were scrapped after talks between Devenish and the council. Despite the success of the new shopping centre, Devenish suffered operational losses and ultimately decided to sell the building to Greenalls plc in the mid-1990s. A succession of owners followed, selling Brewers Quay approximately every 3–4 years. The site was sold to Scottish & Newcastle in the late 1990s, to Spirit Group in 2004 and Punch Taverns in 2007. A lack of investment in the building since the early 1990s had resulted in growing repair costs, while the council refused to consider residential uses of the building. As a result, Brewers Quay was seen as unsaleable. Punch Taverns attempted a redevelopment plan, Brewery Quarter, in 2008. However, they failed to secure any interested developers or operators for the plans, which included the creation of a boutique hotel.

Faced with increasing costs and losses, the site was sold to a local investment group, Brewers Quay Investment LLP, in 2010. By the end of the year, Brewers Quay was closed and plans for its future commenced. The investment group's plans centred around converting Brewers Quay into an 85-bed hotel, while including space for luxury apartments, a museum and other attractions, shops and a restaurant. The project was predicted to cost £15 million and was expected to be completed in time for the 2012 Summer Olympics. However, in 2011-12, the group ultimately decided that the plans were not viable. The calculated costs of redevelopment were greater than expected, while there had been limited interest in the retail space.

In 2012, the owners decided to generate some income from the building by leasing space for a bar and restaurant named Salt Pop Up Bar & Kitchen, which was open in time for the Olympics. Later in 2012, an art gallery was also opened in a front space of the building, where it remained until early 2013.

== Use as an antiques emporium and new redevelopment plans (2013-17) ==
In March 2013, Brewers Quay reopened primarily as an antiques emporium, holding approximately 50 traders. Space was made for Weymouth Museum and a new D-Day Museum, while an Italian restaurant, Il Porto, was also opened. Although this generated revenue from the ground and first floor levels of the building, the upper levels remained vacant.

In 2015, the owners made new plans to redevelop the building. This included space for 35 residential units, retail units, Weymouth Museum and "wet weather/exhibition space and cultural experience space". The plans were approved in November 2016. However, in late 2016, the building was sold to Versant Developments & Homes, who announced their intentions of redeveloping the building along similar lines. The emporium closed in July 2017.

== Recent years (2018-) ==
Work on the redevelopment of Brewers Quay commenced in 2024 and is due to be completed in 2026.

== See also ==
- List of breweries in England
