= Tudor House Museum, Weymouth =

Historic house museum in Weymouth, England

Coordinates: 50.6061°N 2.4532°W

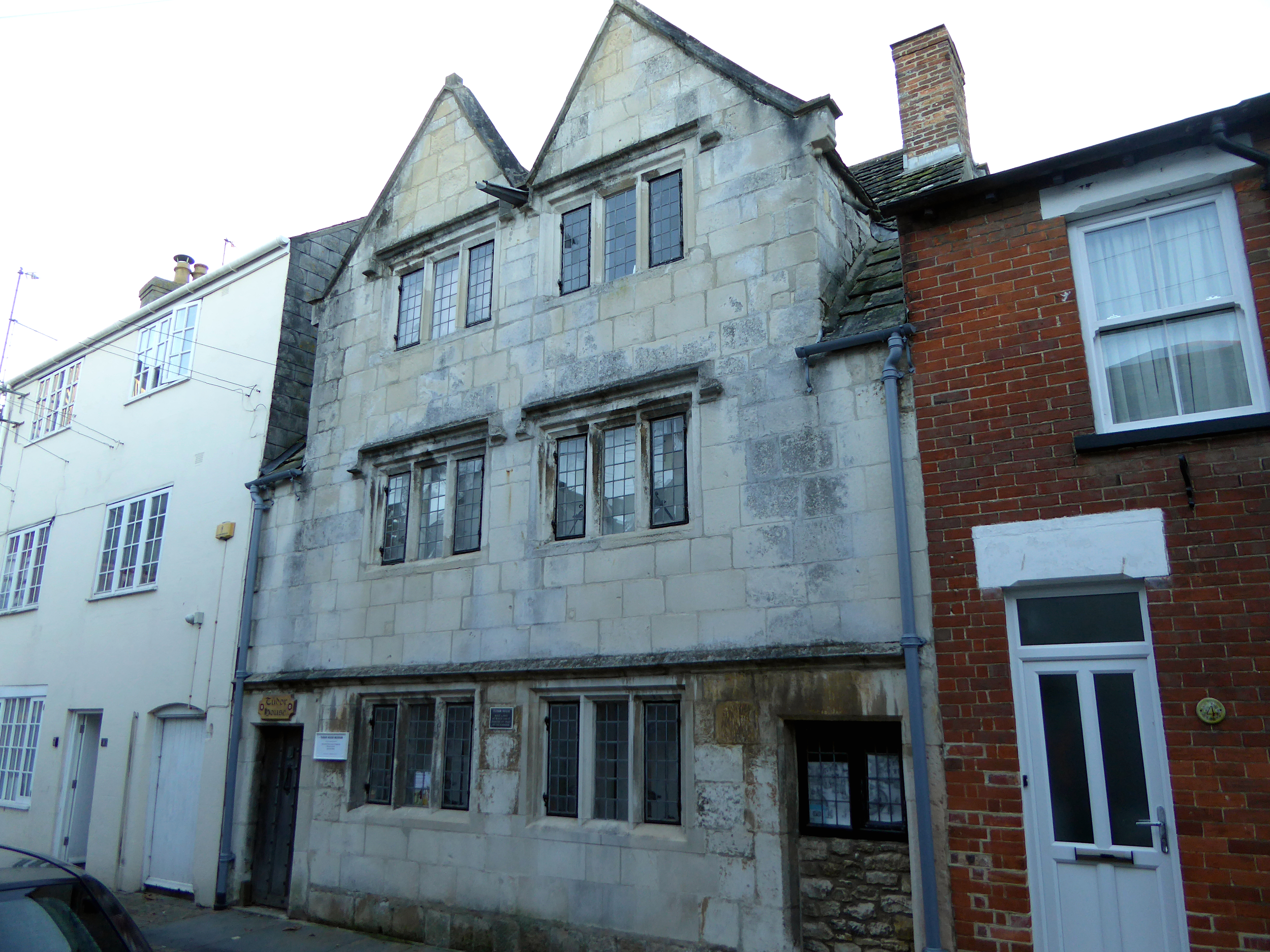
Tudor House Museum

The Tudor House Museum, often simply known as Tudor House, is an early 17th-century building, which remains a museum and one of the UK's best preserved Tudor buildings. It is in Weymouth, Dorset, close to Brewers Quay and Weymouth Harbour. The house has been a Grade II Listed building since December 1953.

== History ==
Tudor House, an Elizabethan substantial, three-storey house, was built around 1600, estimated to be between 1603 and 1610 by a merchant who built it as a harbour-side house. Due to the closeness to the harbour, this allowed the trader to moor his boats right outside his home and unload his goods. The house is made of Portland stone ashlar, with a slate roof. It originally stood on the edge of what was known as 'The Cove', an inlet from the harbour allowing ships to be moored alongside. Today, it remains furnished as the home of an early seventeenth-century middle-class family. One of Weymouth's treasured Tudor buildings, its original use came to an end with the filling in of the inlet in the late 18th century, as the inlet was silted up and turned into a street. The building remained as two small houses until the 1930s, and in 1936, the building was condemned for demolition as it was deemed unfit for habitation via a Closing Order imposed just before the Second World War, but it was saved due to the intervention of the Second World War, and after it was purchased by the Weymouth Ancient Buildings Society. However, it then became derelict, having been empty during the Second World War and suffering from bomb damage.

During the 1950s, a local architect, Walmsley Lewis, the last of the Trustees and Secretary (1944–1977), acquired the property, undertook extensive restoration, and restored the building to a single dwelling, which he furnished in the style of an early 17th-century home of a middle-class family. In order to furnish it, he travelled all over the UK and Europe to buy genuine Tudor and Stuart articles. In 1977, at the time of his death, the house was bequeathed by Lewis to Weymouth Civic Society, who continue to own and operate the house today. The Civic Society volunteers provide guided tours of the house during opening hours. The tour gives an insight into the history of Weymouth in the early 17th century during its heyday as a port for trade and exploration. The guides describe the domestic daily life of the times, including furniture and clothing, cooking and serving of food, lighting, and candle making.

In May 2011, the house, as an attraction, celebrated its 50th anniversary. Residents from Weymouth and nearby Portland were given a free tour of the building.

== See also ==
- Nothe Parade
- Weymouth Museum
