= Weymouth Town Bridge =

Road bridge in Weymouth, Dorset, England

Coordinates: 50.60723°N 2.45545°W

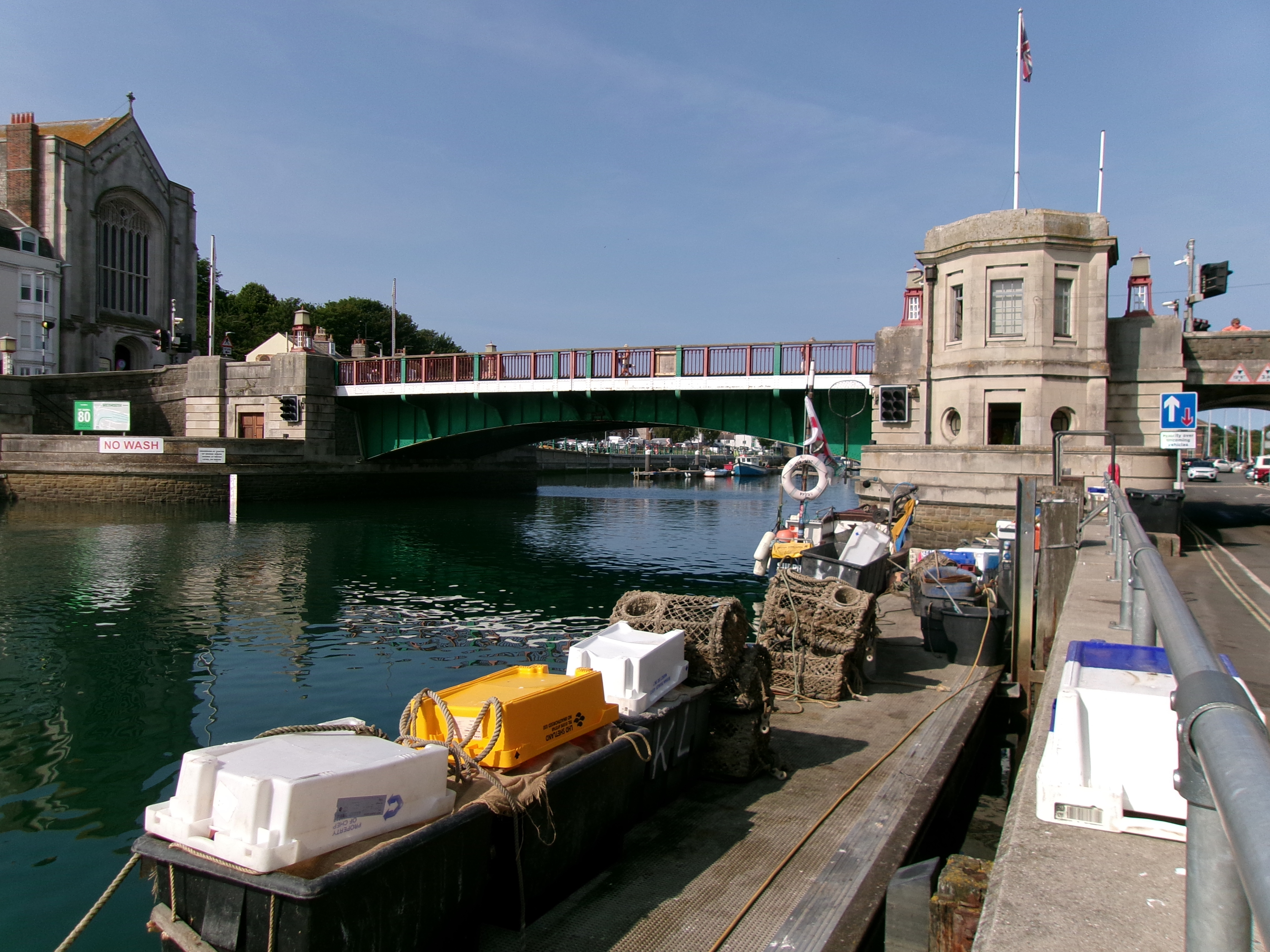
Weymouth Town Bridge

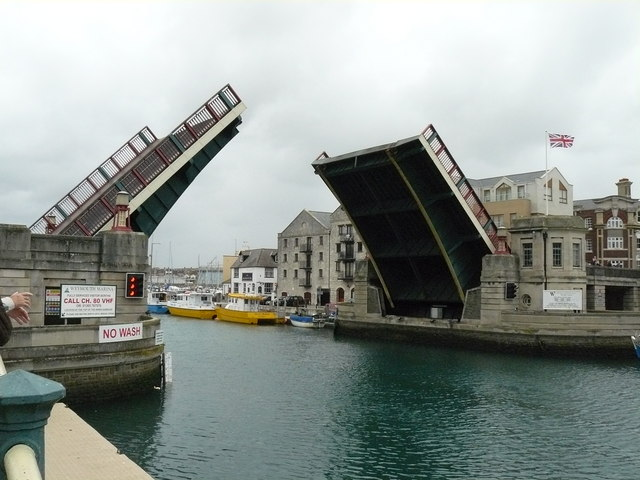
The bridge being raised.

Weymouth Town Bridge is a lifting bascule bridge in Weymouth, Dorset, England, connecting the formerly separate boroughs of Weymouth and Melcombe Regis. The bridge can be lifted to allow boats access to the inner backwater of Weymouth Harbour, known as Weymouth Marina. The bridge, opened in 1930, is the sixth to have been built across the harbour since 1597 and has been Grade II Listed since 1997. Today, the hydraulically-operated bridge is raised every two hours, 363 days of the year.

== History ==
Weymouth and Melcombe Regis had been united by Queen Elizabeth I to form Weymouth in 1571. The first bridge connecting the two boroughs was built of timber in 1597 to replace a rope ferry that had operated for many years. This bridge underwent repair after suffering damage during the English Civil War of 1642-1646. The bridge was rebuilt three times during the 18th-century; in 1713, 1741 and again in 1770. Plans for the first stone bridge were drawn up in 1821, and the bridge was completed and opened in 1824.

The present bridge was constructed in 1929-30, with the foundation stone having been laid in April 1929 by Percy Boyle, the Mayor of Weymouth. Bolton and Larkin Ltd was employed as the general contractor, with the steelwork contract going to Cleveland Bridge & Engineering Company. Local men were employed to construct the bridge, which cost £90,000 to build, funded by the Borough Council, the Ministry of Transport and Dorset County Council. It was opened by HRH Duke of York on 4 July 1930.
