= Custom House, Weymouth =

House in Weymouth, Dorset, England

Coordinates: 50°36′26″N 2°27′11″W

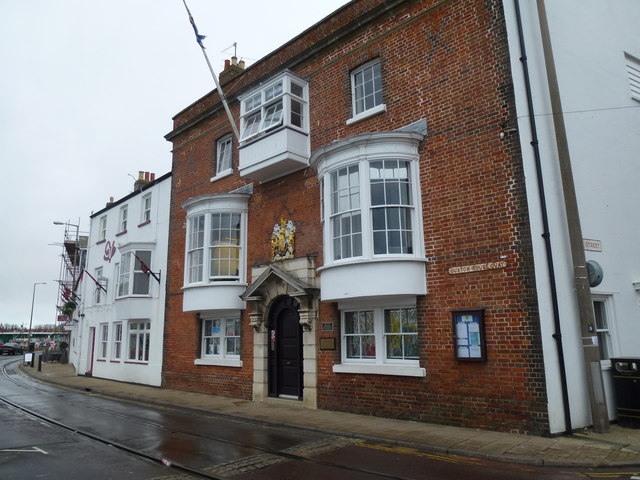
The former Custom House at Custom House Quay.

The Custom House is a former custom house at Weymouth, Dorset, England, operated by HM Customs to handle the trade of Weymouth Harbour. The building, which has origins to the late 18th century, has been Grade II listed since 1970.

== History ==
The Custom House was originally a warehouse and residence, completed around 1794. The warehouse was operated by Messrs Robilliard and Ahier, the former of whom lived in the ground floor residence. In the early 19th century, the building went through much modification. Later in 1874, the then-owner Sir Frederick Johnstone, leased the building to HM Customs, who continued to use the building as a Custom House until 1985. Portland's HM Coastguard then took over and renovated the building for use as a Maritime Rescue Sub-Centre, which opened in 1988. In 2010, it was announced that the centre would be closed as part of government cuts. The centre closed in September 2014 and was subsequently sold.

In 2016, planning permission was approved to turn the ground floor of the building into a water sports training facility with a cafe, and the first, second and third floors into residential apartments.
