= Weymouth Marina =

Coordinates: 50.609°N 2.457°W

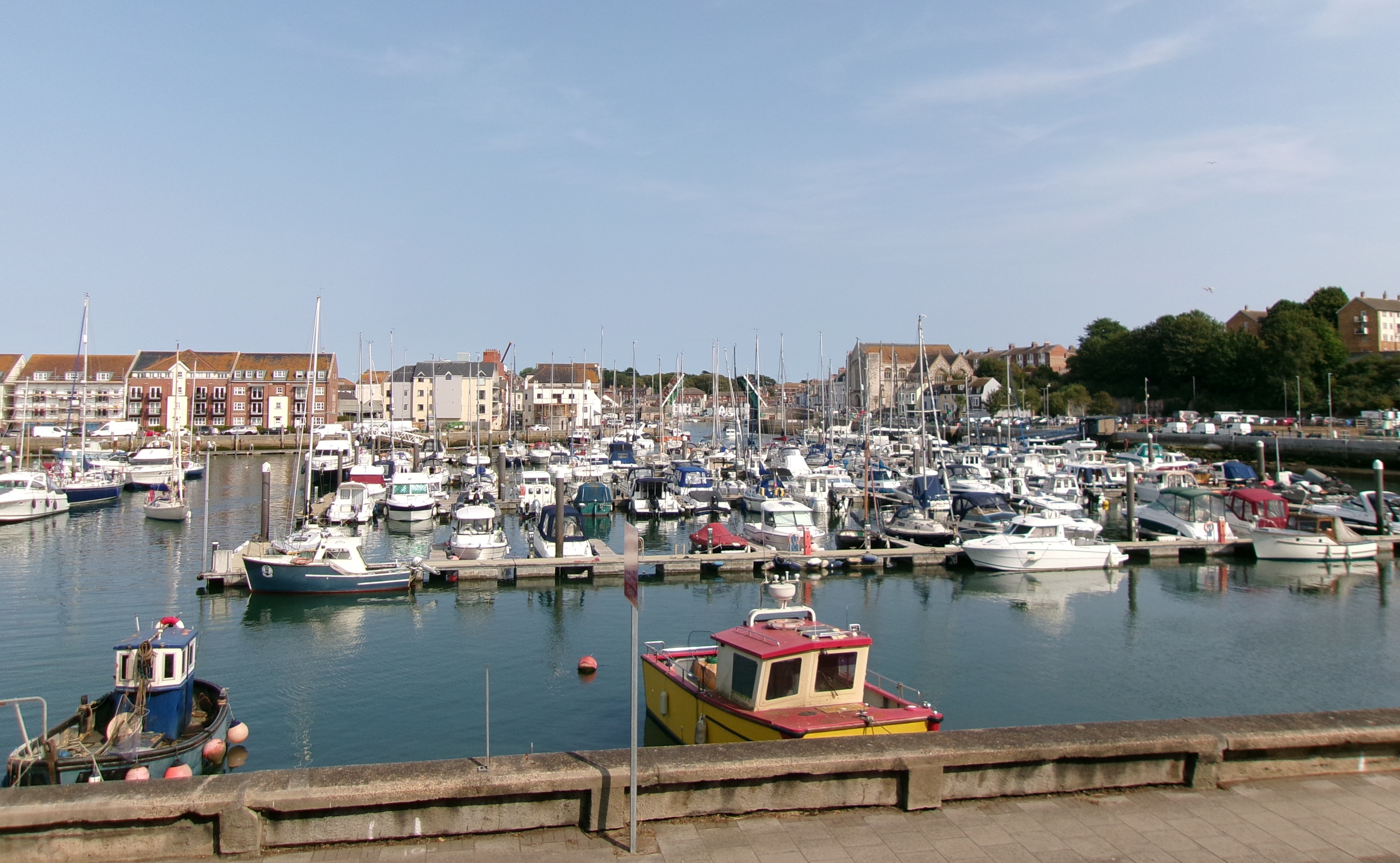
Weymouth Marina

Weymouth Marina occupies most of the inner backwater of Weymouth Harbour, Dorset, England. The marina was refurbished to accommodate more vessels in the 1990s, and today houses hundreds of pleasure cruisers, fishing boats, yachts, dinghies and speedboats. Access to the marina is via a lifting road bridge across the harbour between Weymouth and Melcombe Regis.
