= Nothe Gardens =

Public gardens in Weymouth, England

Coordinates: 50.6059°N 2.4478°W

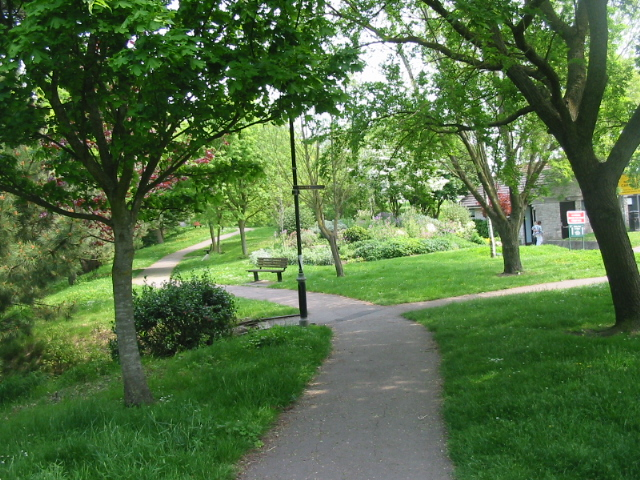
Nothe Gardens

Nothe Gardens is a public garden, located in Weymouth, Dorset, England. Positioned on the Nothe Peninsula overlooking both Weymouth and Portland harbours, the informal gardens are often acclaimed to be the most beautiful the borough has to offer.

The gardens include Nothe Fort, built in 1872 to protect Portland's harbour, and today a museum and tourist attraction.

On the coast below the gardens are Stone Pier at the entrance to Weymouth Harbour and Newton's Cove on the other side.

== History ==
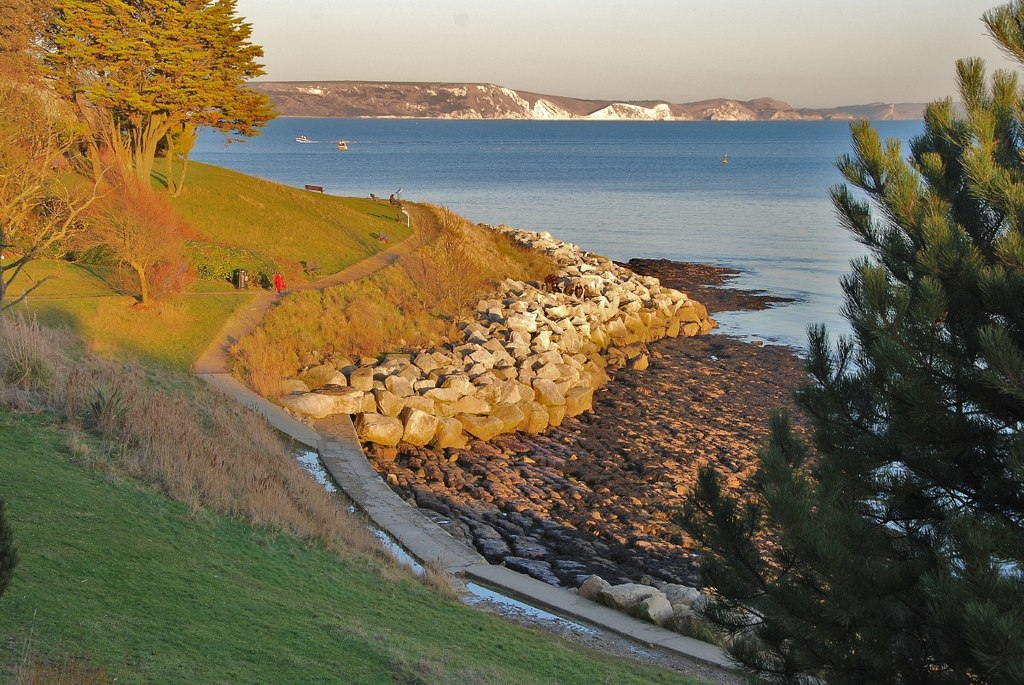
Nothe Gardens and part of Newton's Cove

The Nothe is an area, covering 40,000 square metres of land, that has not been changed by modern development. In the past, the area played an important military role as defence of Weymouth port, whilst today it is a more tranquil place. The main flat top of the Nothe Gardens was once a military encampment and is public open space today. In 1888, the Gardens were at the beginning of their establishment.

During World War II, the gardens to the west of Nothe fort were the location of an anti-aircraft gun battery comprising four Vickers Armstrong QF 3.7-inch AA guns. The battery was later removed, entirely by the 1970s, and replaced by a car park. A restored gun of the same type is now situated on the ramparts of Nothe Fort.

A 90-centimetre searchlight defence was situated at the bottom of the garden, overlooking Portland Harbour to illuminate surface targets. It would have been constructed between 1940–41, using concrete. The emplacement remained in the gardens throughout the 20th century, until it was destroyed by a landslip in 1988. However, by this point the Nothe Fort had become a tourist attraction, and members of the Weymouth Civic Society decided to rebuild a replica of the structure inside the grounds of the fort. The replica was equipped with an original 90mm searchlight and associated equipment, and remains accessible to the public through entry to the fort. It is situated on the northern side of the fort. Another searchlight emplacement, used as a sentry light to guard the entrance of Weymouth Harbour, is situated nearby at Weymouth's South Pier, and has become scheduled under the Ancient Monuments and Archaeological Areas Act 1979.

== Wildlife ==
The area attracts many types of animals and species, and often displays various bird species and grey squirrels. Other animals found in the area includes bats, roe deer, foxes, badgers, hedgehogs, shrews, mice and slow worms, amongst other creatures such as insects, whilst plant life is also varied. A vast array of choice trees and established shrub beds are found in the area.

== Friends of the Nothe Gardens ==
The Friends of the Nothe Gardens are a band of residents and locals who care about the gardens and promote the enjoyment of the area. The supporters main goal is to make the gardens "a jewel amongst Weymouth's attractions".

In recent times, the trust has been funded by a grant from the Lottery.

== Use in the 2012 Olympics ==
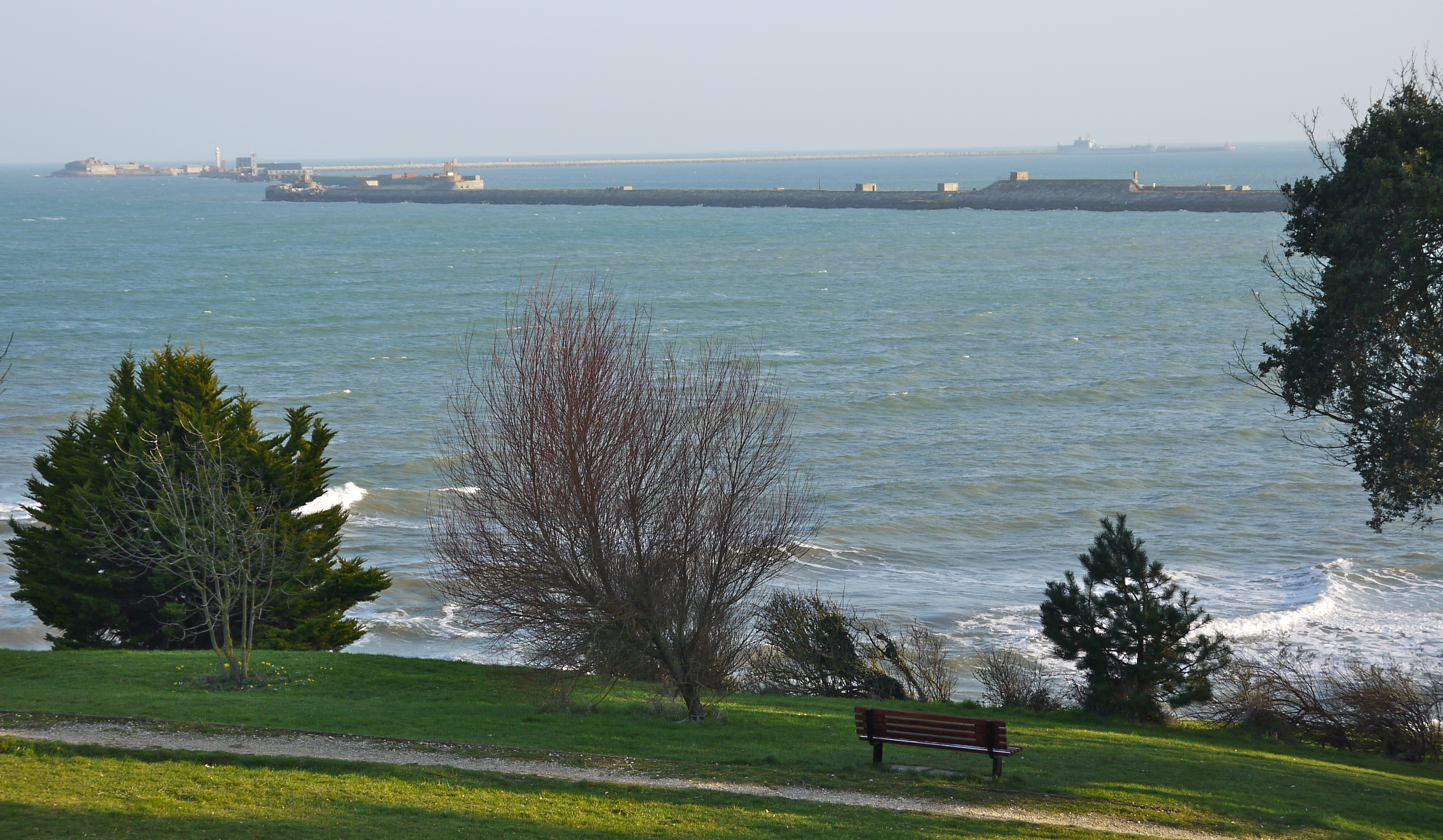
Portland Harbour from Nothe Gardens

For the Weymouth and Portland Sailing Events in the 2012 Olympics, the gardens were closed to the public, where organising committee LOCOG decided to charge spectators £20 to £50 for a day's admission to the gardens to view the sailing events. As a result, the local residents vented anger at the borough councillors for supporting the plan.

A fence was built and sectioned off part of the Nothe Gardens to enable it to be managed as a ticketed site. The rest of the Gardens remained open for residents and visitors without charge. Nothe Fort recruited 150 people to help out as marshals during the games, as an expected 4,600 ticketed spectators a day flocked to the official view point during the fortnight.

== See also ==
- Nothe Parade
- Wellington Court
- Weymouth Peace Garden
