= Devenish Brewery =

Former brewery in Weymouth, Dorset, England

Devenish Brewery, also known as J. A. Devenish & Co. Ltd, was a brewery in Weymouth, Dorset, England, that was founded in 1821 by William Devenish. It primarily operated from Weymouth's Hope Square, but also had a facility at Redruth, Cornwall. Devenish was sold to Greenalls in 1993.

== History ==
Devenish Brewery originated with the Flew Brewery, which had operated from Hope Square since 1742. William Devenish acquired a lease of the brewery in 1821 and then purchased it three years later. The brewery retained the Flew name until 1851, when it was changed to J. A. Devenish & Co. Ltd. The company acquired the Cornish Brewery Co. Ltd at Redruth in 1934 (later renamed Devenish Redruth Brewery Co Ltd in 1960) and the Weymouth-based rival Groves & Sons Ltd in 1960.

Devenish faced financial difficulties by the 1980s, and brewing ceased at Hope Square in November 1985. Following its closure, Devenish and Weymouth & Portland Borough Council launched a major plan to transform the building into a shopping centre with a pub and restaurant. Devenish spent £4.5 million on refurbishing the building and transforming it into Brewers Quay, which opened in June 1990. The new complex was hailed as "the Covent Garden of Dorset" and received numerous awards and commendations.

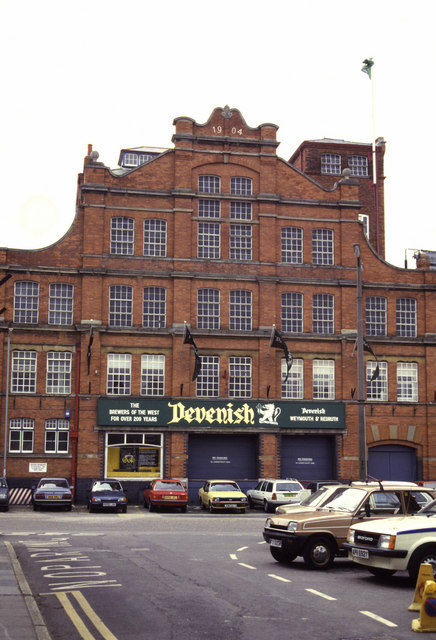
Brewers Quay seen in 1987, two years after brewing had ceased there.

Meanwhile, in February 1986, Devenish merged with Cheltenham-based Inn Leisure Group, led by Michael Cannon in a deal worth £30 million, and brewing was concentrated at the Redruth facility. The merger was not without controversy as Devenish axed tenants in favour of pub managers and introduced the Newquay Steam Beer range of beers, which publicans claimed were unpopular with pub regulars. Profits jumped however the company started expanding, including the £1 million purchase of a group of south Wales steak restaurants from Mecca Leisure Group.

In 1990, the group sold its Canonbury wholesale business for £15 million.

The Redruth site was sold to new operators in June 1991 and renamed Redruth Brewery. It closed in 2004.

Devenish remained active as a pub company and distributor until 1993, when it was sold for £214 million to Greenalls.
