= Hope Square =

Square in Weymouth, Dorset

Coordinates: 50°36′20″N 2°27′09″W

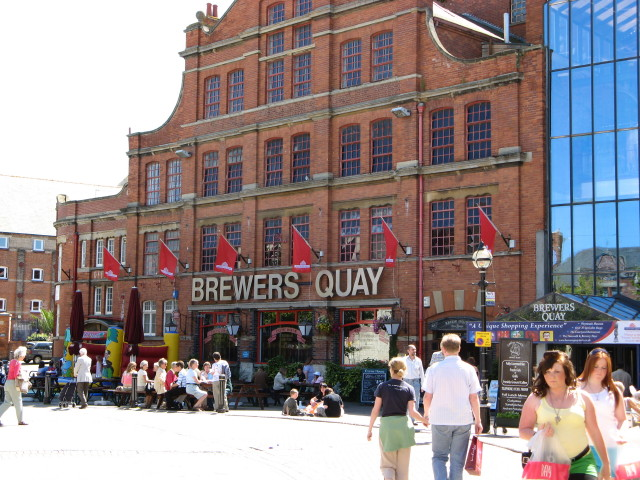
Brewers Quay in Hope Square

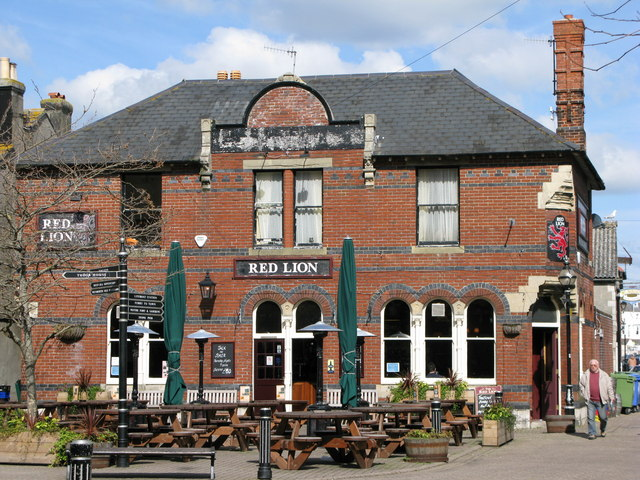
The Red Lion public house

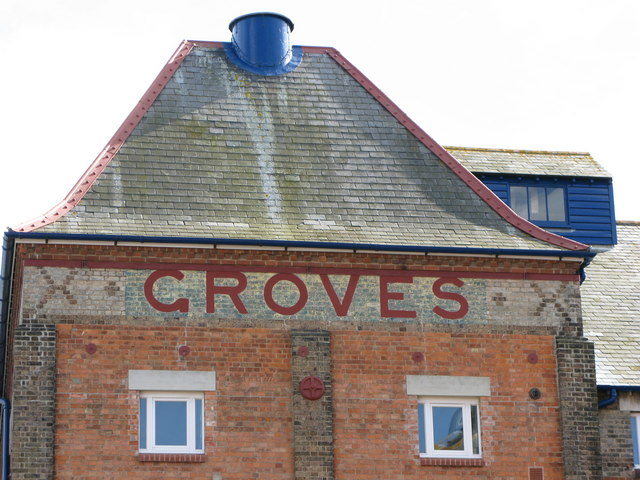
The Maltings of John Groves Brewery, located just off Hope Square, and now containing apartments

Hope Square is a historic square to the south of Weymouth Harbour in the seaside town of Weymouth, Dorset, southern England. Hope Street, Cove Street, and Trinity Street all lead via a short walk north to the harbour.

Brewers Quay, previously housing a brewery, is on the south side of the square. It formerly housed Weymouth Museum and is under redevelopment. There are many restaurants and pubs in the area, including a number directly on the square, such as The Red Lion pub, (established 1851), Il Porto Italian restaurant in Brewers Quay, and the Galley Bistro.

The square is popular with tourists and hosts a number of festivals, often including live music. The Tudor House Museum is close to the square in Trinity Street.

== See also ==
- Nothe Parade
- The Esplanade, Weymouth
