= Nothe Fort =

Fort in Weymouth, Dorset, England

Coordinates: 50.6075°N 2.4439°W

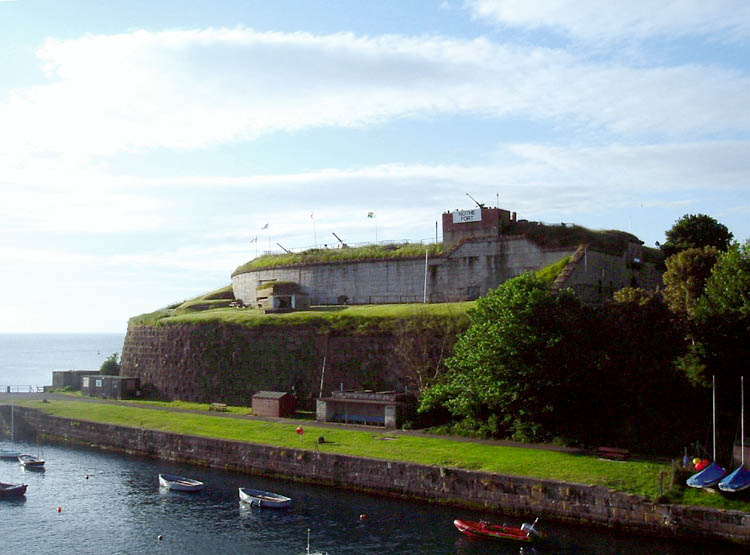
The Fort is situated beside Weymouth Harbour.

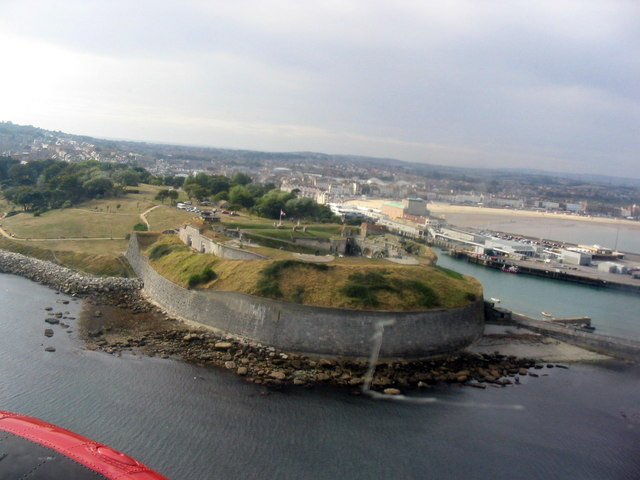
Nothe Fort from the air

Nothe Fort /noʊð/ is a fort in Weymouth, Dorset, England, situated at the end of the Nothe Peninsula, which juts eastwards from the town of Weymouth, and Weymouth Harbour, into the sea to the north of the ex-military Portland Harbour. The fort is located next to Nothe Gardens.

The coastal defence was built between 1860 and 1872 by 26 Company of the Royal Engineers to protect Portland and Weymouth Harbours, with Portland then becoming an important Royal Navy base. Shaped like the letter D, the fort was built with bomb-proof casemates and deep magazines. The fort was abandoned in 1956 and purchased by the local council in 1961. It is now a museum and remains one of the best-preserved forts of its kind in the country.

The fort and its outer gateway have been Grade II* listed since 1974. Its fusee steps, located in Nothe Gardens, have been Grade II listed since 2000, and was constructed for hauling trolleys transporting ammunition, spares and stores from the quay to Nothe Fort. In 1978, the Nothe Fort, tramway and searchlight battery at The Nothe, also became scheduled under the Ancient Monuments and Archaeological Areas Act 1979.

== History ==
=== Military ===
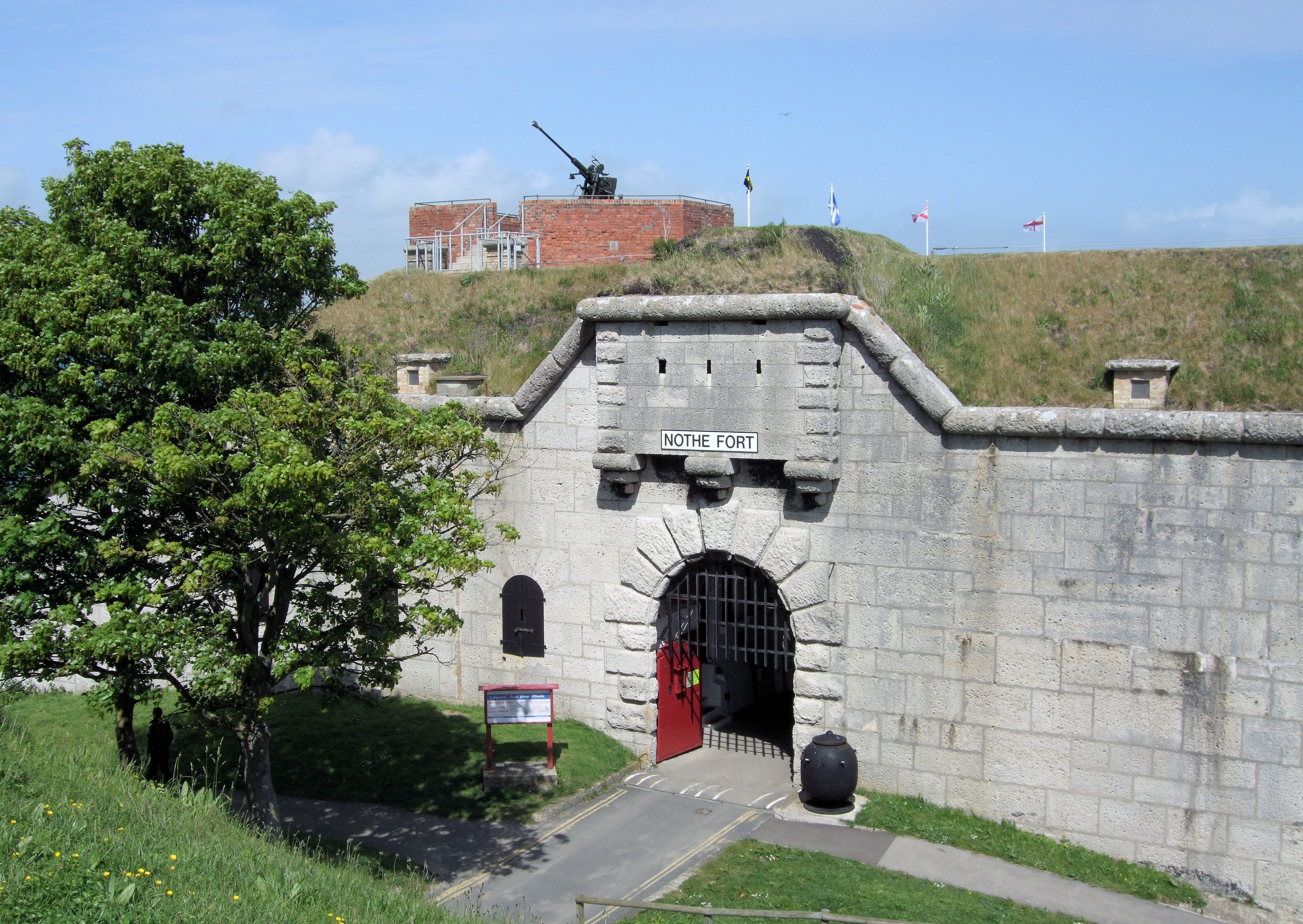
The fort's entrance

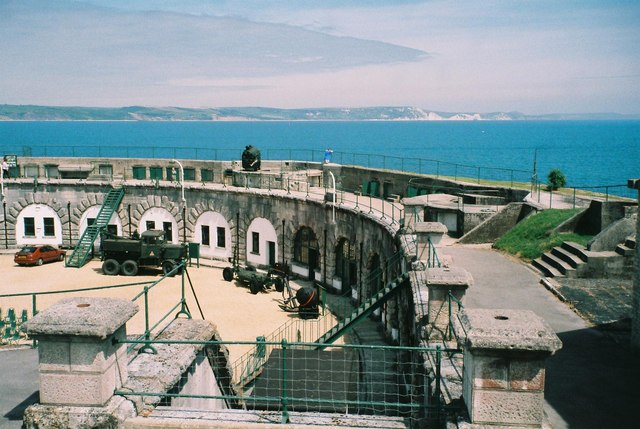
The fort's courtyard

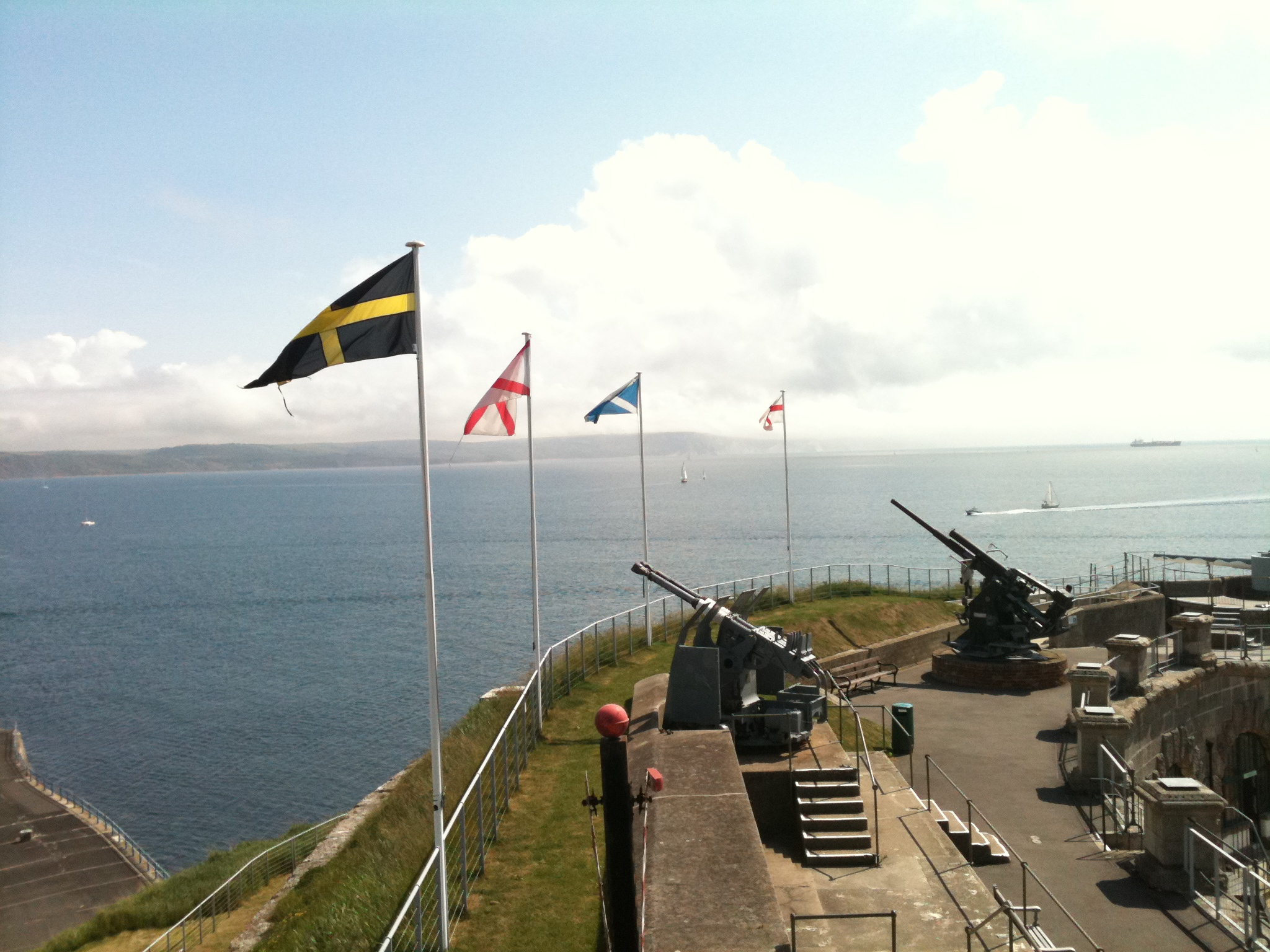
Guns on the Fort Ramparts

Work began on Nothe Fort in 1860 by a civil engineering contractor, with the first stage of construction involving leveling the site and building a sea wall. After the contractor suffered financial problems, the construction work was taken over by 26 Company Royal Engineers in 1862. Although the upper earthen parapet was complete by 1869, the fort was fully commissioned in 1872 at a total cost of £117,049. It was constructed on three levels; the magazine stored the ammunition, the ground level casemates were designed to hold heavy muzzle-loaded cannons and accommodation for the soldiers manning them, and the ramparts, featuring a raised platform that could be used to fire weapons such as muskets and light muzzle-loaded cannons during attacks.

The first soldiers to be stationed at the fort were No. 2 Battery Royal Artillery (Tatton-Browns). The unit were given responsibility to install the original cannons, which were two 64 pounders, four 9-inch rifled muzzle loaders and six 10-inch cannons. During the 1890s, seven of the guns were replaced by 12.5-inch RML guns. With the introduction of breech-loading guns in the early 20th century, the RML guns were removed and replaced by three 6-inch Mark VII breechloading naval guns on the ramparts. In order to carry the 100-pound shells from the magazines, a series of hoists were installed.

In 1938 alterations were completed to allow the fort to be used as a central anti-aircraft ammunition depot for the south west, which included installing an electrically-operated hoist and the construction of a loading platform. Nothe Fort did not see combat until World War II. In July 1940, two ships entered the area and failed to identify themselves, prompting the fort to fire its guns as a warning. The two ships immediately switched on their lights, revealing themselves to be refugees from the Channel Islands. During the war, the fort was equipped with a battery of four Vickers QF 3.7-inch AA guns. The guns are sited on a purpose-built platform within the north-west corner of the fort, which was later replaced by a Bofors 40 mm gun.

It was abandoned in 1956 as it was no longer required as a coastal defence, then used by the Royal Navy to house stores and degaussing equipment.

=== Recent history ===
By 1961 the Navy had no further use for the fort and it was sold to Weymouth and Melcombe Regis Borough Council. Under the ownership of the council the fort remained unoccupied and quickly became a victim of vandalism, before starting to fall into a state of dereliction. During this time numerous ideas were suggested, including turning the fort into a luxury hotel complex. Work began to turn the fort into a hotel in 1971 but was soon abandoned shortly after.

In 1980, the Weymouth Civic Society took over responsibility for the fort through a lease with the borough council, allowing restoration work to begin, with assistance from the Manpower Services Scheme. Later in the 1980s, as a result of the Cold War period, part of the fort's magazine level was used as a nuclear shelter for civil administration, which included the creation of command and accommodation areas, and the installation of heavy blast doors.

Nothe Fort has been gradually transformed into a museum and tourist attraction, where it remains open to the public today. Following the early restoration work, the fort was given a £1.8m lottery grant and a further £600,000 investment due to the involvement of local authorities and English Heritage. The fort is run by a team of 10 paid staff members and a dedicated team of over 100 volunteers, while the Friends of Nothe Fort group has also been established to promote interest in the fort and to encourage its growth as a museum and attraction.

The museum features models, World War II memorabilia as well as original cannons and guns. It has many displays, exhibits and audio-visual facilities. The courtyard often holds community events such as military festivals, concerts, dramas, and cultural Olympiad.

In 2007, a survey carried out by The National Lottery revealed the fort to be voted one of the spookiest locations in the UK.

In 2012, hundreds of individuals applied to be volunteers at the fort for the Summer Olympics. 150 people were recruited as marshals during the games, when 4,600 ticketed spectators a day flocked to the official view point for a fortnight. The fort and the gardens were closed off to the public during the games.

== See also ==
- Brewers Quay, a local shopping and heritage centre

== Bibliography ==
- Hogg, Ian V (1974). Coast Defences of England and Wales 1856-1956. David & Charles. ISBN 0-7153 6353-0.
