= Esplanade (disambiguation) =

Esplanade most commonly refers to a raised walkway.

Esplanade or The Esplanade may also refer to:

== Walks, parks, and streets ==
- Esplanade (Bronx), a street in New York City
- Esplanade (Hamburg), an avenue in Hamburg
- Esplanade, Kolkata, a neighbourhood in central Kolkata, India
- Esplanade, Penang, a waterfront location in the heart of George Town, Penang, Malaysia
- Esplanade, Singapore, a waterfront location just north of the mouth of the Singapore River in downtown Singapore
- Esplanade Avenue, New Orleans
- Esplanade Park, Fremantle, a public reserve in Fremantle, Western Australia
- Esplanade Park, Singapore, a park in the central district of Singapore
- The Esplanade (Perth), a road in Perth, Western Australia
- Esplanade Reserve, a former heritage listed public space in Perth, Western Australia
- The Charles River Esplanade in Boston, Massachusetts
- The Esplanade (Toronto), a street in Toronto close to Downtown
- The Esplanade (Weymouth), a walkway and street on the seafront at Weymouth, Dorset, southern England
- Esplanadi / Esplanaden, an urban park in Helsinki
- The Esplanade, Olympic Park, Montreal

== Venues, complexes, and buildings ==
- Esplanade (Algonquin) refers to a mixed-use shopping, dining, living, and office complex in Algonquin, Illinois
- Esplanade Hotel (Melbourne), a live music venue in Melbourne, Australia
- Esplanade – Theatres on the Bay, a performance arts venue located at the Esplanade, Singapore
- The Regent Esplanade, a luxury hotel in Zagreb, Croatia
- The Esplanade (Bangkok), a shopping mall in Bangkok, Thailand
- The Esplanade (Kenner, Louisiana), a shopping mall in Kenner, Louisiana
- The Esplanade, a Mississippi Landmark

== Stations ==
- Elizabeth Quay Bus Station, Perth, Western Australia, known as the Esplanade Busport until January 2016
- Elizabeth Quay railway station, Perth, Western Australia, known as the Esplanade station until January 2016
- The Esplanade railway station, a former station in Fremantle, Western Australia
- Esplanade MRT station on the Circle line in Singapore
- Esplanade metro station on the Kolkata Metro
- Esplanade de La Défense station, a station on Paris Metro Line 1
- Ryde Esplanade railway station, in the town of Ryde on the Isle of Wight

== Other ==
- Esplanade Sandstone, which forms an esplanade, a geologic unit in Grand Canyon, and Arizona, Southwestern United States
- The Esplanade, a hot spring in Mammoth Hot Springs, Yellowstone National Park
- Esplanade, a Bayer Environmental Science brand name for several herbicide formulations containing indaziflam (sometimes as a mix with other herbicides)

== See also ==
- Esplanada (disambiguation)
- Esplanaden (disambiguation)
- Esplanade Mall (disambiguation)
- Esplanade Park (disambiguation)
- Hotel Esplanade (disambiguation)
