= Weymouth Pier =

Pier in Weymouth, Dorset, England

Coordinates: 50.6092°N 2.4467°W

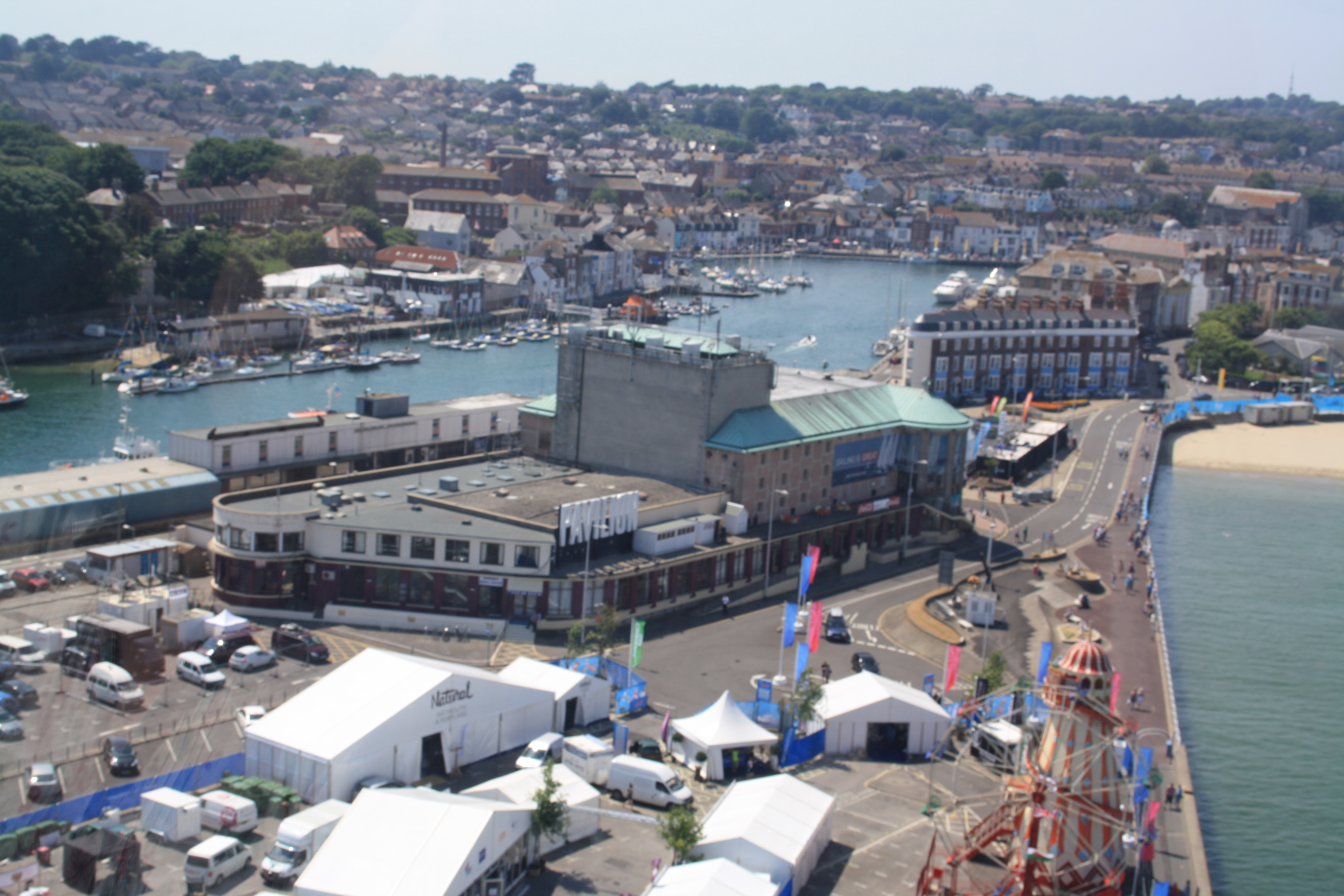
Weymouth Pier, with the rear of Weymouth Pavilion and Weymouth Harbour seen during the Summer 2012 Olympics

Weymouth Pier is a pier between Weymouth Harbour and Weymouth Beach, in Dorset, England. It was intended to extend Weymouth's esplanade, and consists of a theatre, Weymouth Pavilion, pleasure pier, car parking and a cross-channel ferry terminal. The entire site underwent redevelopment to include new facilities for the 2012 Olympic Games, including the Weymouth Sea Life Tower.

== Early history ==
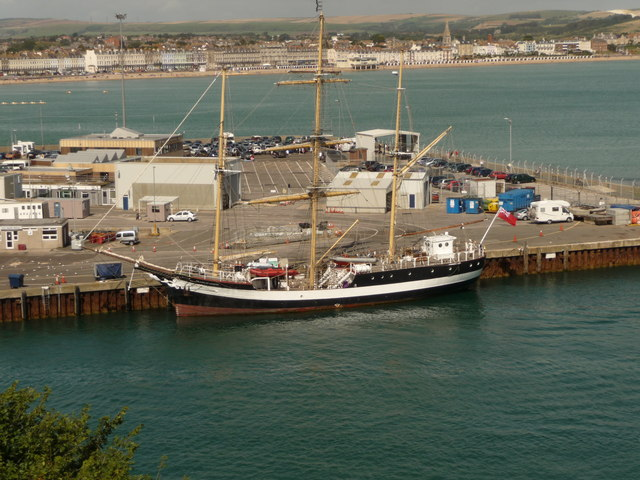
The sail training ship Pelican of London berthed at Weymouth Pier

There is little documented history of the origins of Weymouth Pier, though it is believed that a structure existed as early as 1812.

== The new pier ==
Costing £120,000 in 1933, the pier was constructed in reinforced concrete, reaching a length of 400 metres (1,300 ft) and varying between 30 metres (100 ft) in width at the shoreward end and 12 metres (40 ft) at the seaward end.

When built, the pier was divided into two halves. The southern side of the deck was reserved for commercial use, and was fitted out to load and unload cargo from harbour ships, including electric cranes, electrically operated capstans and two railway tracks. The pier was capable of handling one passenger vessel, three cargo vessels and two pleasure steamers simultaneously.

The northern side, fenced off from the industrial section, was a promenade area. This included shelters, a diving stage, changing rooms, and at night the whole promenade area would be illuminated, with views across Weymouth Bay and Nothe Fort.

== Key dates ==
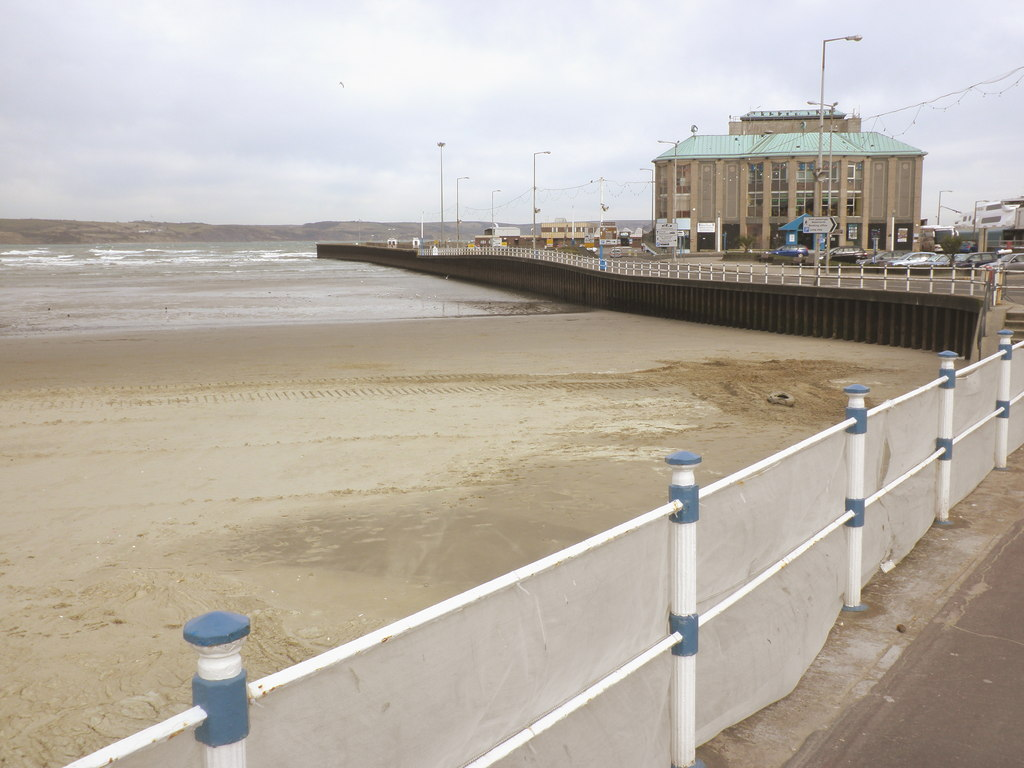
Weymouth Pier and the pavilion seen from Weymouth Beach.

- 1840: Considerable change was made to the port area when a pile-pier, filled with a mixture of Portland stone and shingle concrete, was built on the northern edge of the harbour;
- 1860 Weymouth Pier was largely rebuilt in timber and at the same time, extended to a length of 273 metres (900 ft);
- 1877: A cargo stage was added;
- 1889: A landing stage and baggage handling hall were built;
- 1908: The Weymouth Pavilion opened;
- 1930s: The pier was rebuilt;
- 13 July 1933: The new Weymouth Pier officially opened; the ceremony was carried out by the Prince of Wales, soon to become King Edward VIII;
- 1954: The Ritz Theatre Renamed after the war) was destroyed in a fire;
- 1961: A New Pavilion opened;
- 1971–1972 The pier was widened to create a new terminal and a large car park to serve the ferry port and Weymouth Pavilion
- 1993: The Alexandra Gardens Theatre damaged by fire;
- 2007–2011: Redevelopment of the entire peninsula was planned for the 2012 Olympic Games but apart from an observation tower (known as Jurassic Skyline) this did not take place.

== See also ==
- Pavilion Theatre
- Pier Bandstand
