= Pier Bandstand, Weymouth =

Demolished pier and bandstand in Weymouth, Dorset, England

Pier Bandstand
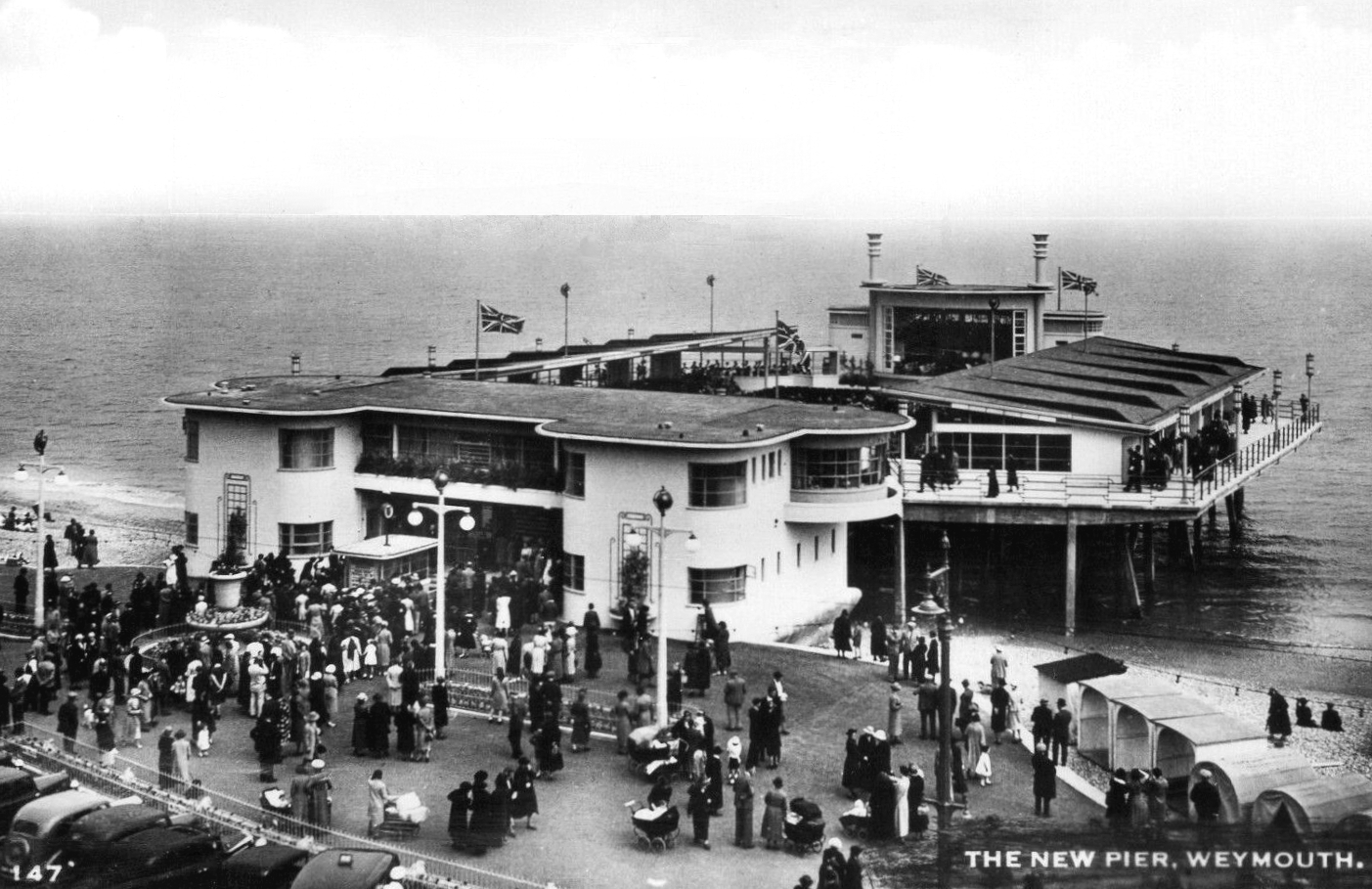
- The Pier Bandstand in circa 1939.
- Type: Pleasure pier, bandstand
- Location: Weymouth, Dorset, England
- Coordinates: 50°37′02″N 2°27′03″W

Characteristics
- Total length: 60.9 m (200 ft)

History
- Designer: V. J. Wenning of London
- Constructor: Christiani & Nielson Ltd of London
- Opening date: 25 May 1939
- Demolition date: April–May 1986

The Pier Bandstand was an Art Deco bandstand on the shore of Weymouth Bay in Dorset, England. Built between 1938 and 1939 to the designs of architect V. J. Wenning, the Pier Bandstand was one of Weymouth's most popular entertainment centres. The bulk of the structure was demolished in 1986, leaving the entrance building at the landward end as the only remaining part. It currently houses an Italian restaurant, amusement arcade, and gift shop.

== History ==
=== Construction of the Pier Bandstand (1938–1939) ===
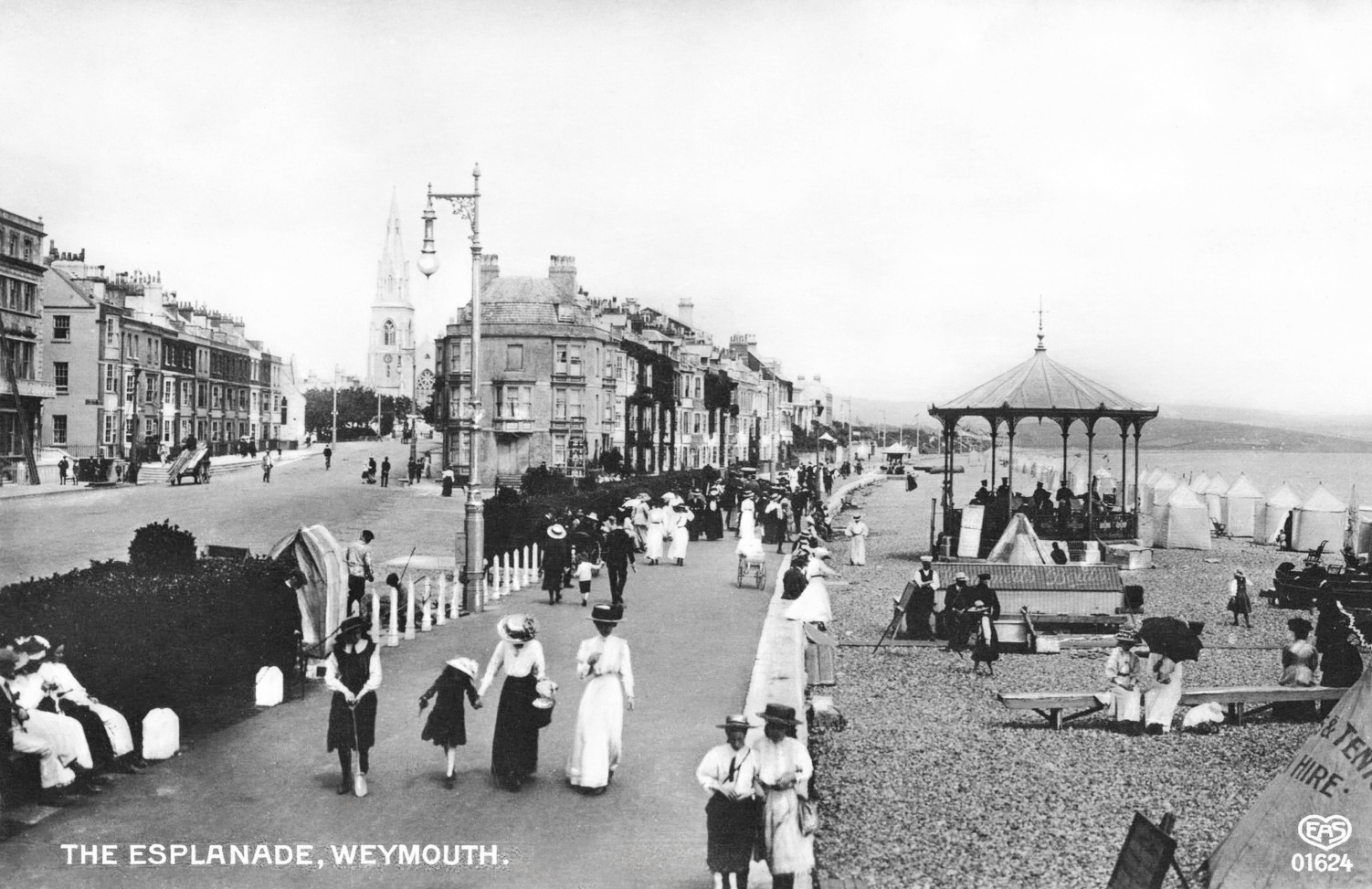
Weymouth Esplanade in c. 1910, with the original bandstand of 1907 on the right.

The Pier Bandstand was built for the Weymouth Corporation between 1938 and 1939 at a cost of £35,000. Located in the northern region of the Esplanade, the site chosen for the new structure was already the location of a bandstand erected in 1907 and known as the Burdon or Esplanade Bandstand. Weymouth Corporation resolved to "construct a new bandstand and concert enclosure on the sea front" in June 1936. An open competition was launched for its design and the plans of architect V. J. Wenning of London were selected by the assessor, H. S. Goodhart-Rendel, in May 1937 from twenty-six entries. The first pile was driven on 18 March 1938 and the opening ceremony for the completed structure was performed by the Mayor of Weymouth, John T. Goddard, on 25 May 1939. Upon its opening, The Builder reported that the structure is "believed to be the first modern amusement centre of its kind to be built out over the sea".

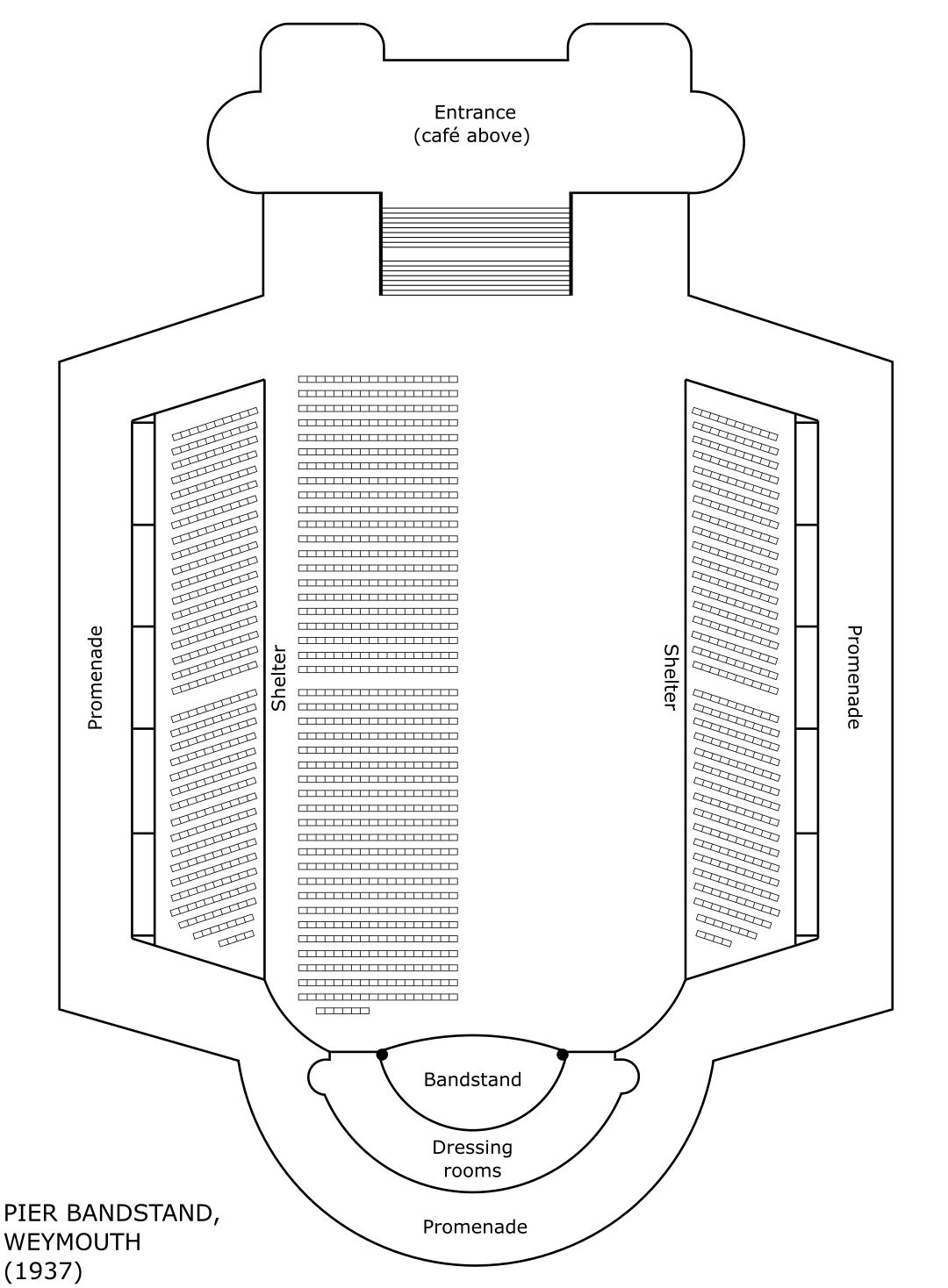
Plan of the Pier Bandstand, based on original drawings (1937).

The Pier Bandstand extended 200 feet seawards and was built of reinforced concrete on piles, driven approximately 16 feet into the seabed. The two-storey entrance building at the landward end contained a 30 foot wide staircase, providing access to the raised main deck, and a café on the first floor with capacity for 150 people. Flower beds, shrubs and flower troughs were planted outside the entrance to "help make the approach to the bandstand enchanting and gay in character". The main deck was approximately 20 feet above beach level and was able to seat 2,400 people, with approximately 800 seats under the cover of two glazed shelters with cantilevered roofs. The seaward end's semi-circular bandstand had space for up to 50 performers and a grand piano, with dressing rooms and a green room behind. The bandstand was carefully designed to "produce reinforcing reflections and distribution of sound", making it not only suitable for band performances but a range of other shows and events. It was anticipated that a performer's voice could be projected 200 feet without the use of a microphone, but the design allowed for the installation of microphones and loud speakers if required. An outer promenade ran around the edge of the main deck.

Overall, 3,050 metric tons (3,000 long tons) of concrete, 180 metric tons (180 long tons) of steel, 8.8 kilometres (5.5 mi) of electrical conduit, 750 metres (2,500 ft) of neon tubing and 1,200 light bulbs were used during the course of construction. The general contractors were Christiani & Nielson Ltd of London, the consulting engineers were L. G. Mouchel & Partners Ltd of London, and F. W. Hill (Bognor Regis) Ltd was responsible for general finishings. The lighting scheme, which used neon tubing and tungsten filament lamps, was prepared by Falk, Stadelmann & Co Ltd of London, and their associate company, Ionlite Ltd, and the wiring installation was undertaken by Bennett & Escott Ltd of Weymouth.

=== Use of the Pier Bandstand (1939–1985) ===
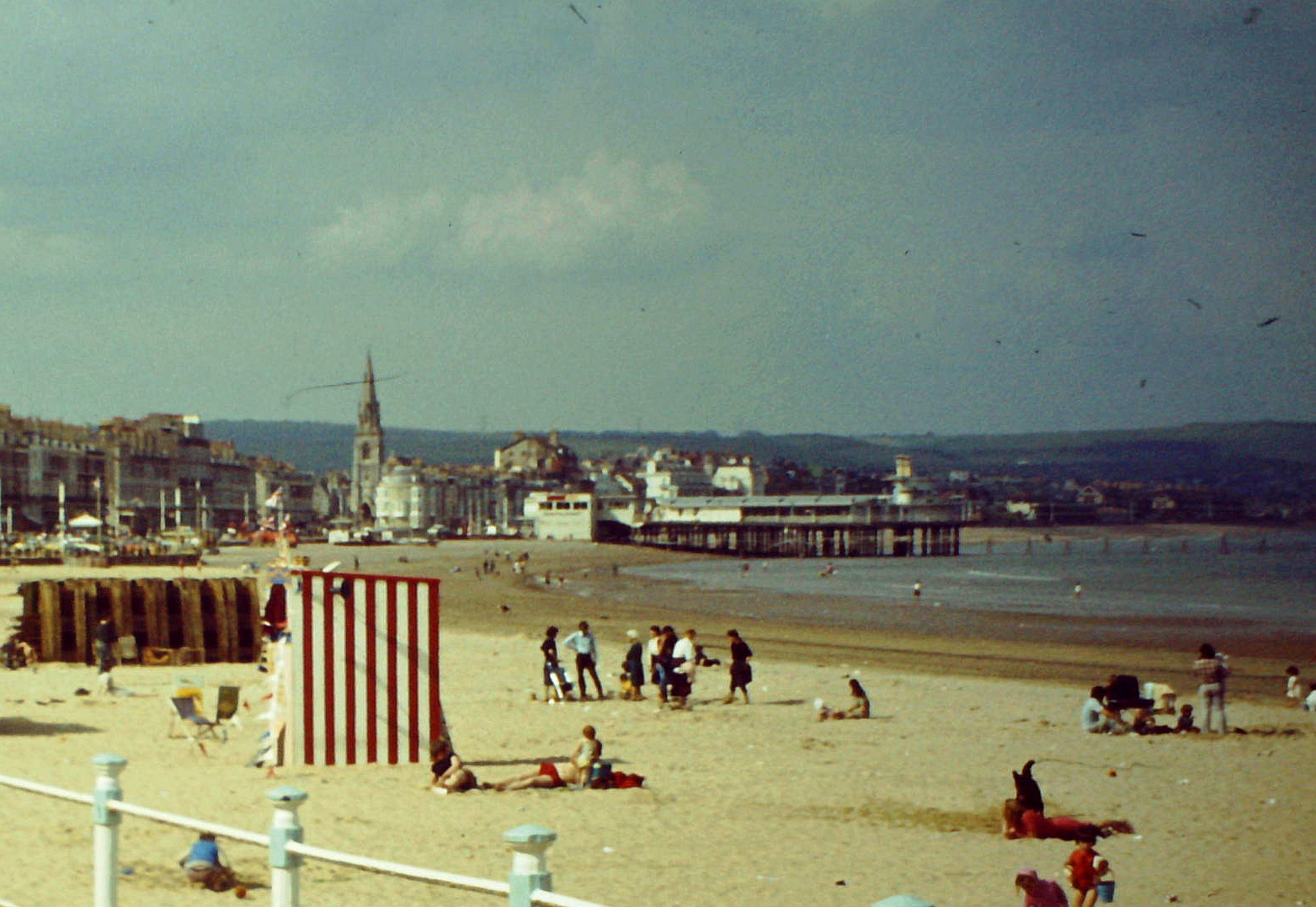
Weymouth Beach in 1983, with the Pier Bandstand seen jutting out into the bay.

Over 250,000 people paid for admission onto the Pier Bandstand during the summer season of 1939. There were only 55,000 and 50,000 admissions during the peak seasons of 1940 and 1941 respectively on account of wartime regulations and restrictions. The Pier Bandstand was closed for the majority of World War II, but fully reopened in July 1944. Some minor remedial work to the concrete piling was undertaken in 1943.

Although the structure gained some criticism for its intruding visual impact along the bay, it quickly became one of Weymouth's most popular entertainment centres and hosted many events from concerts, dances, wrestling, roller skating to the Miss Weymouth Bathing Beauty Contests. From circa 1944, the entrance building contained the café (and later restaurant) Pullingers, run by Dennis and Mary Pullinger.

During the 1960s, the entrance building underwent alterations to the designs of Crickmay and Sons of Dorchester. In 1967, as its popularity declined, the Pier Bandstand was redesigned to house an amusement arcade and rides. Extensive repairs were also carried out to the structure's reinforced concrete pilings between 1966 and 1967.

In 1979, the Pier Bandstand Amusement Park underwent a £50,000 refit, which included the installation of new arcade machines, mini dodgems, an inflatable castle, and radio-controlled boats. In 1981, the Pullingers sold their restaurant business to Derek and Susan Abutt, who turned it into the Seaview Restaurant. A helter skelter was added to the pier in 1984.

=== Demolition (1986) ===
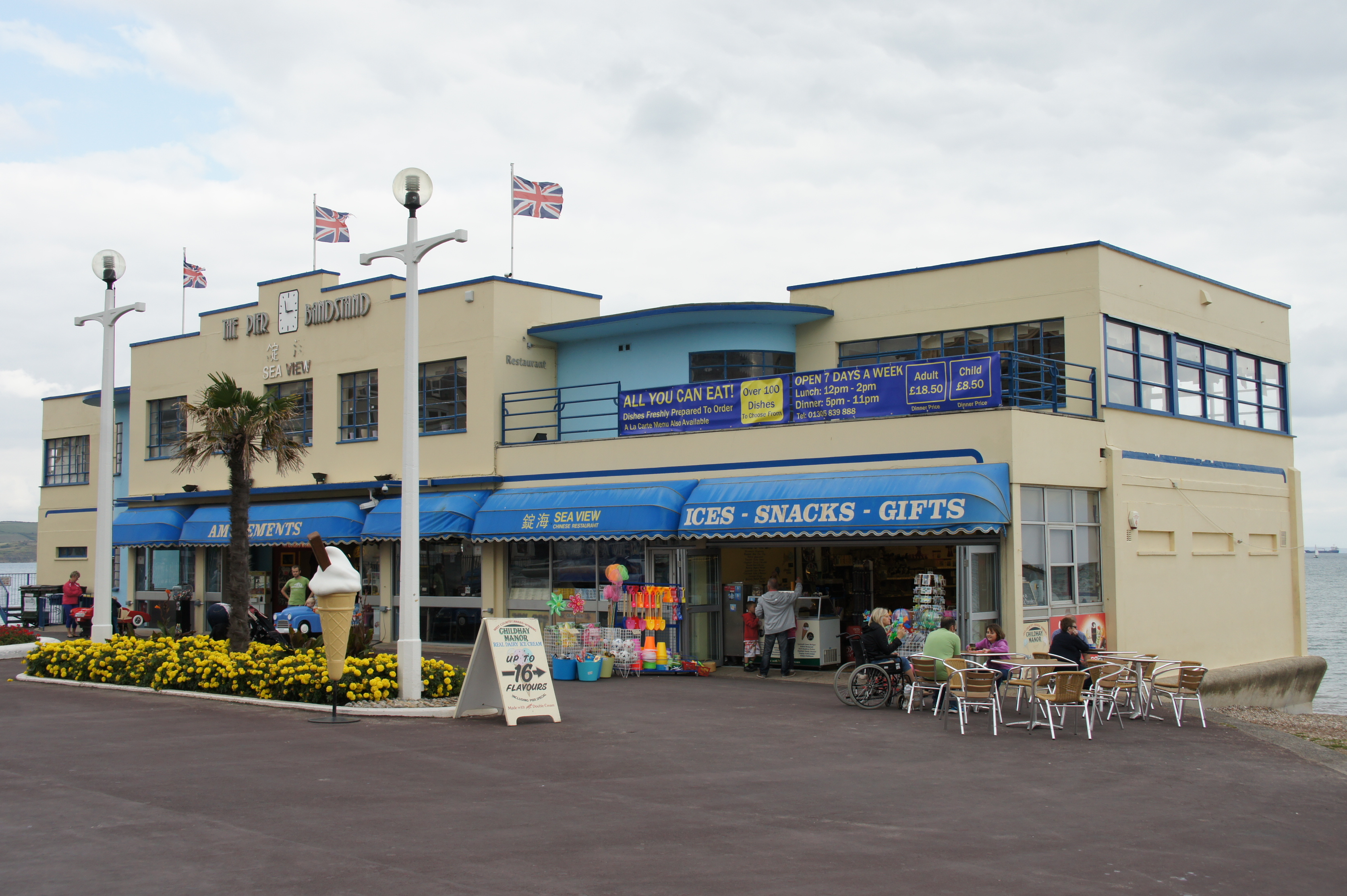
The remaining entrance building of the Pier Bandstand in 2013.

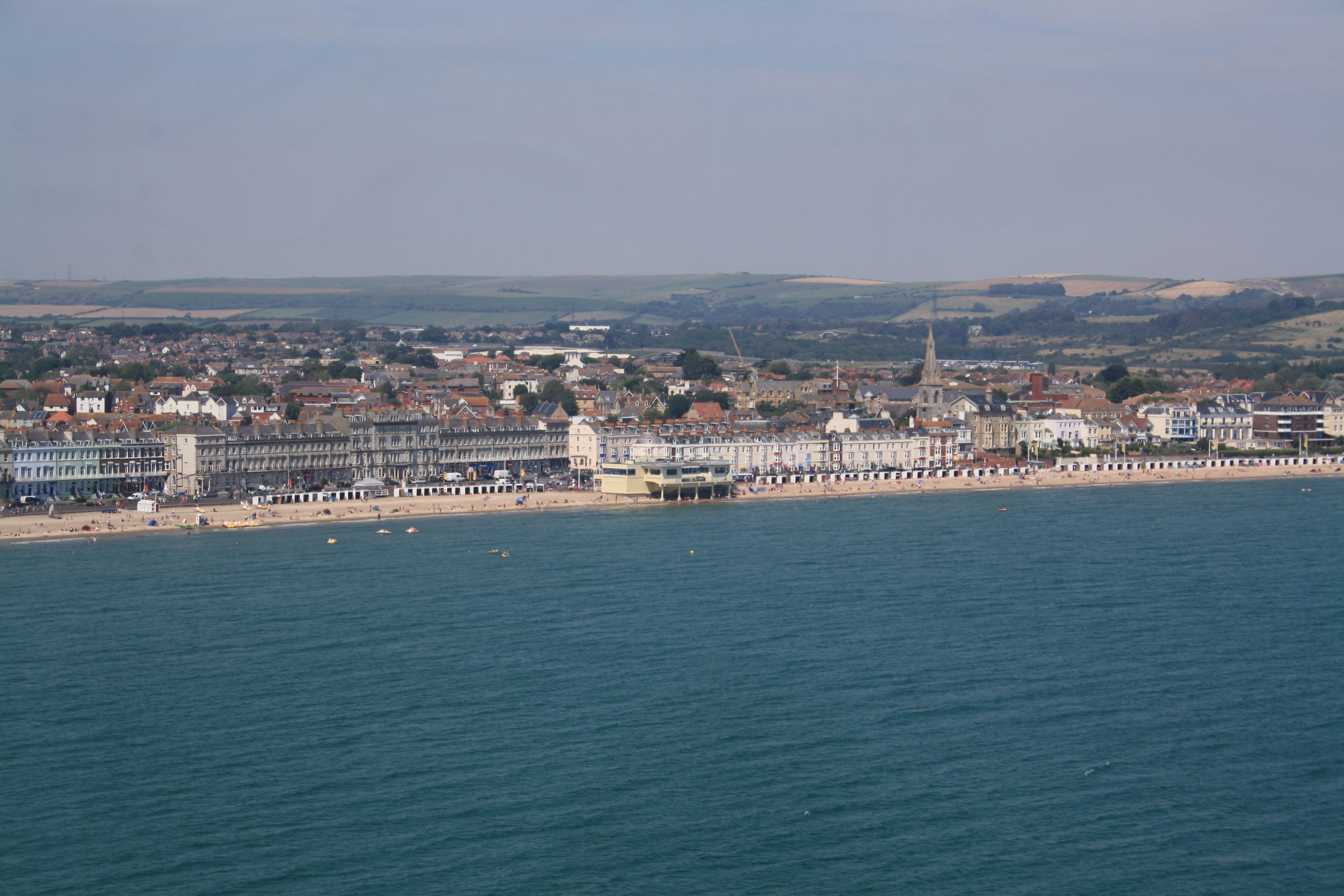
The entrance building (centre), seen from the top of the Sea Life Tower in 2012.

In 1985, a structural report by the engineers Lewis and Duvivier concluded that the Pier Bandstand was in an "unsafe condition" and its closure to the public was recommended on health and safety grounds. The report identified that the piles had suffered severe deterioration and "could not be expected to carry the weight of the platform much longer".

The long term options faced by Weymouth & Portland Borough Council included rebuilding and repairing the existing structure for an estimated £300,000, demolish it for somewhere between £60,000 to £100,000, or replace it with a new pier for an estimated £220,000. In order to keep the existing structure open to the public until the end of the 1985 peak season, the council carried out temporary measures. They had additional props and deck strutting installed to provide extra support, and fencing was erected around the structure at beach level to stop public access underneath the pier. The number of people allowed onto the pier at any one time was also limited.

After further discussions and an examination of the options, the council voted in January 1986 to demolish the Pier Bandstand at a cost of £33,264. The entrance building, which still contained its restaurant and sales kiosks, was retained as part of the scheme. Dismantling and demolition work by the council's own workmen began on 11 April 1986. The demolition contractor, Dismantling & Engineering Ltd of Halesowen, then removed the pier's midsection, thereby separating the entrance building from the seaward end of the structure ahead of the latter's demolition using underwater explosives.

A national competition was launched, offering a free package weekend at Weymouth, during which the winner would 'press the button' to demolish the seaward end of the pier. It attracted over 700 entries and was won by a schoolgirl from Birmingham, who carried out the role with her sister. The event took place on 4 May 1986 and attracted thousands of spectators.

=== Post–1986 use of entrance building ===
In 1986, following the demolition of the pier, the ground floor of the entrance building continued to function as an amusement arcade and a storage room was converted into a retail shop. On 20 June 1987, the Seaview Restaurant reopened as the restaurant Surf Connection under a new proprietor.

In 1991, the council considered demolishing the building for an estimated £68,000, but they ultimately voted to retain it. In 1992, Surf Connection became the Old Pier Restaurant under new proprietors.

In 1994, local businessman Peter Bennett took over the lease for the building and formed the company Weymouth Pier Bandstand Ltd. Bennett's refurbishment scheme for the building, which aimed to "restore its 1930s Art Deco look", was given planning approval in 1998, and was carried out between 1999 and 2000.

The Sea Palace Chinese Restaurant opened on the first floor of the building on 21 July 2002. It was replaced by the Italian restaurant Al Molo in 2015 and, in turn, by another Italian restaurant, Oliveto, under new proprietors, in 2023. The ground floor holds an amusement arcade operated by D A Entertainments Ltd, a gift shop, and public toilets.

== Redevelopment plans ==
As part of the regeneration of Weymouth and Portland, it was decided in 2007 that Weymouth's Esplanade would be redeveloped in time for the 2012 Olympic Games. The scheme included plans for the restoration and extension of the bandstand, while the exterior Art Deco features and symmetry would be restored. In addition, the area in front of the bandstand was to be redesigned into a 1930s-styled square, acting as the northern gateway to Weymouth Esplanade. However, the plans collapsed after the South West of England Regional Development Agency withdrew its £6.6 million funding in 2009.

== See also ==
- The Esplanade (Weymouth)
- Weymouth Pier
