= Esplanaden =

Esplanaden may refer to:

- Esplanadi (Swedish: Esplanaden), a park in Helsinki, Finland
- Esplanaden, Copenhagen, a street in Copenhagen, Denmark

== See also ==
- Esplanade (disambiguation)
- Esplanada (disambiguation)
