= Hotel Esplanade =

Hotel Esplanade or Esplanade Hotel may refer to:

== Australia ==
- Esplanade Hotel, Albany, hotel that once stood overlooking Middleton Beach in Albany
- Esplanade Hotel, Fremantle, hotel located opposite Esplanade Park in Fremantle
- Esplanade Hotel, Melbourne, five-level seaside pub commonly called The Espy
- Esplanade Hotel, Perth, hotel on The Esplanade across from Esplanade Reserve in Perth

== Other places ==
- Esplanade Hotel, Scarborough, historic hotel in North Yorkshire, England
- Esplanade Zagreb Hotel, a historic luxury hotel in Zagreb, Croatia
- Hotel Esplanade Berlin, luxury hotel in Germany destroyed in World War II

== See also ==
- Espy (disambiguation)
- Esplanade (disambiguation)
