= Jubilee Clock Tower, Weymouth =

Grade II listed clock tower in Weymouth, England

Coordinates: 50°36′52″N 2°27′09″W

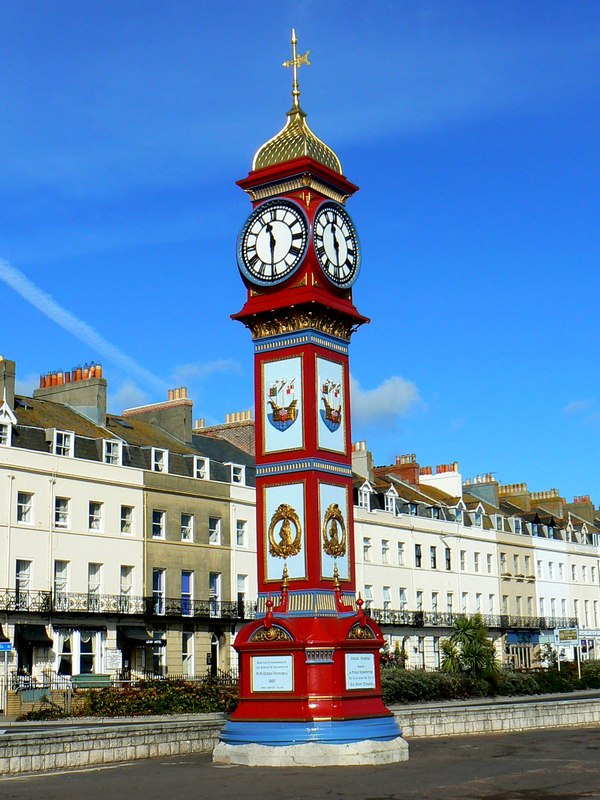
Weymouth's Jubilee Clock Tower

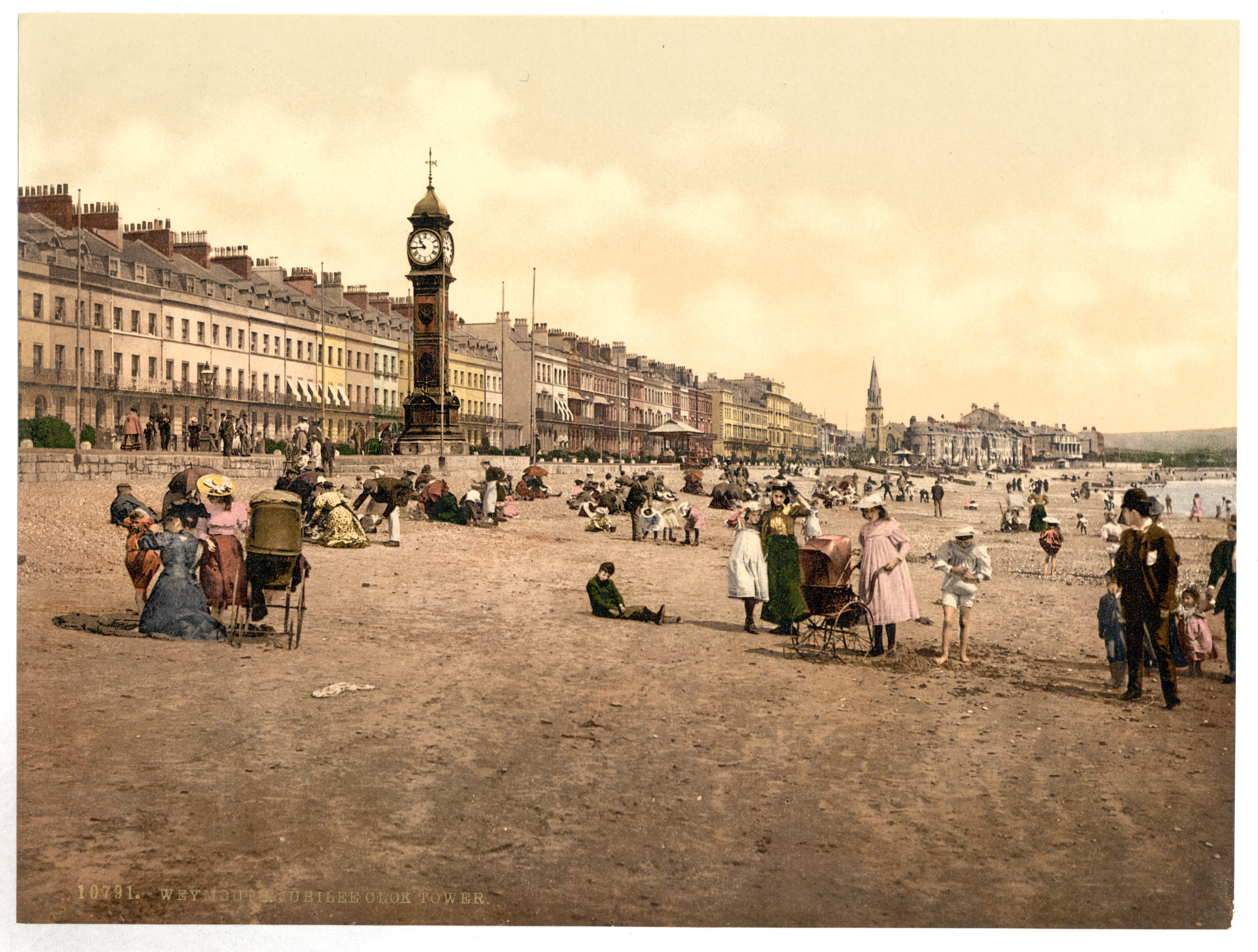
The clock tower seen in its original colours in the 1890s

The Jubilee Clock Tower is a free-standing clock tower on the Esplanade of Weymouth, Dorset, England. It was built and erected in 1888 to commemorate the 1887 Golden Jubilee of Queen Victoria and became Grade II Listed in 1974. Historic England described the clock as being a "florid but characteristic enrichment to the sea-front" and "boldy coloured". It is built of cast and wrought-iron and set on a Portland stone base.

== History ==
Weymouth's Jubilee Clock Tower was built to commemorate Queen Victoria's 50 years of reign in 1887. The tower was paid for by public subscription, with £100 having been collected during celebrations on Her Majesty's Jubilee day of 21 June 1887. The Jubilee Committee then approached the council with the idea for the clock tower, which was readily accepted. As fundraising did not reach enough to provide the clock itself, Sir Henry Edwards donated one, while the gas company agreed to keep the clock illuminated for free in perpetuity. Weymouth Corporation provided the stone base.

The clock tower was unveiled on 31 October 1888. Erected on Weymouth's esplanade, it was set in front of the esplanade slightly projecting onto the sands of Weymouth Beach. In the 1920s, the esplanade was extended around it to protect the beach from the encroachment of shingle from the eastern end, and to provide more promenade space on the seaward side. The clock tower itself was not moved. The clock tower was also painted in bright colours during the same decade.
