= Jurassic Skyline =

Observation tower in Dorset, England

Coordinates: 50.610158°N 2.446400°W

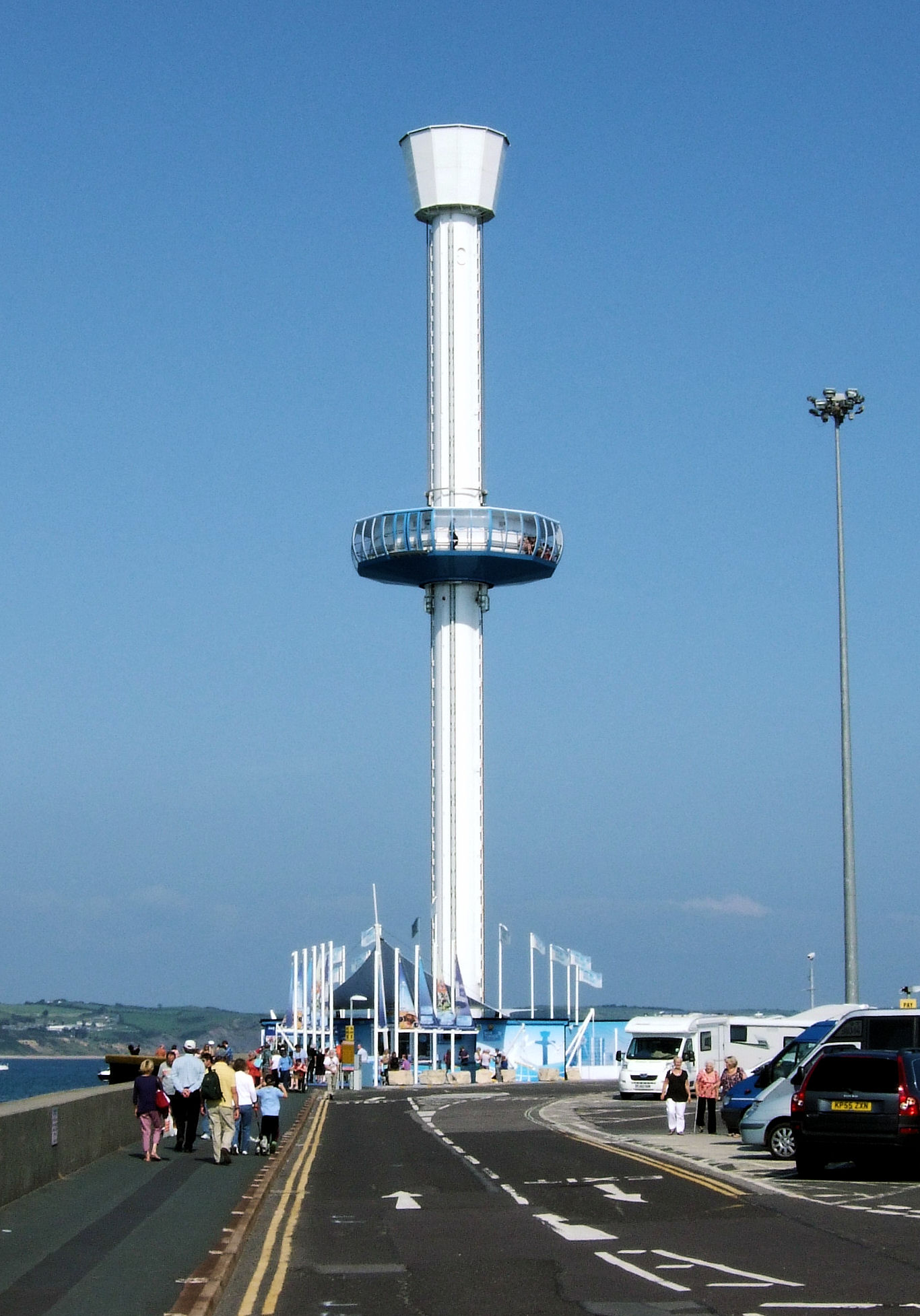
The Jurassic Skyline tower

The Jurassic Skyline tower (known until mid-2015 as the Weymouth Sea Life Tower) was an observation tower on Weymouth Pier in Weymouth, Dorset, England. It was situated next to Weymouth Beach and the Weymouth Pavilion, where it overlooked Weymouth town, the beach, the Pavilion, the Old Harbour, Nothe Gardens, the Nothe Fort, and Portland Harbour. It opened on 22 June 2012.

The tower stood 53 metres (174 feet) high. The clear-fronted passenger gondola could turn a full 360 degrees as it rose during operation, and accommodated 69 passengers at a time. Each tower session lasted approximately 15 minutes. A total of 1,100 tons of concrete was used during building; the tower itself weighed 140 tons. It offered views of the English Channel and the surrounding countryside; on a clear day, views at the highest point were said to extend down the Dorset coast to Lulworth Cove and Durdle Door.

The tower received national attention in September 2017 after the gondola became stuck and could not descend; 13 people were winched off by helicopter as the weather prevented other modes of safe rescue.

In August 2019, the tower was announced to be permanently closed and was subsequently removed.

== History ==
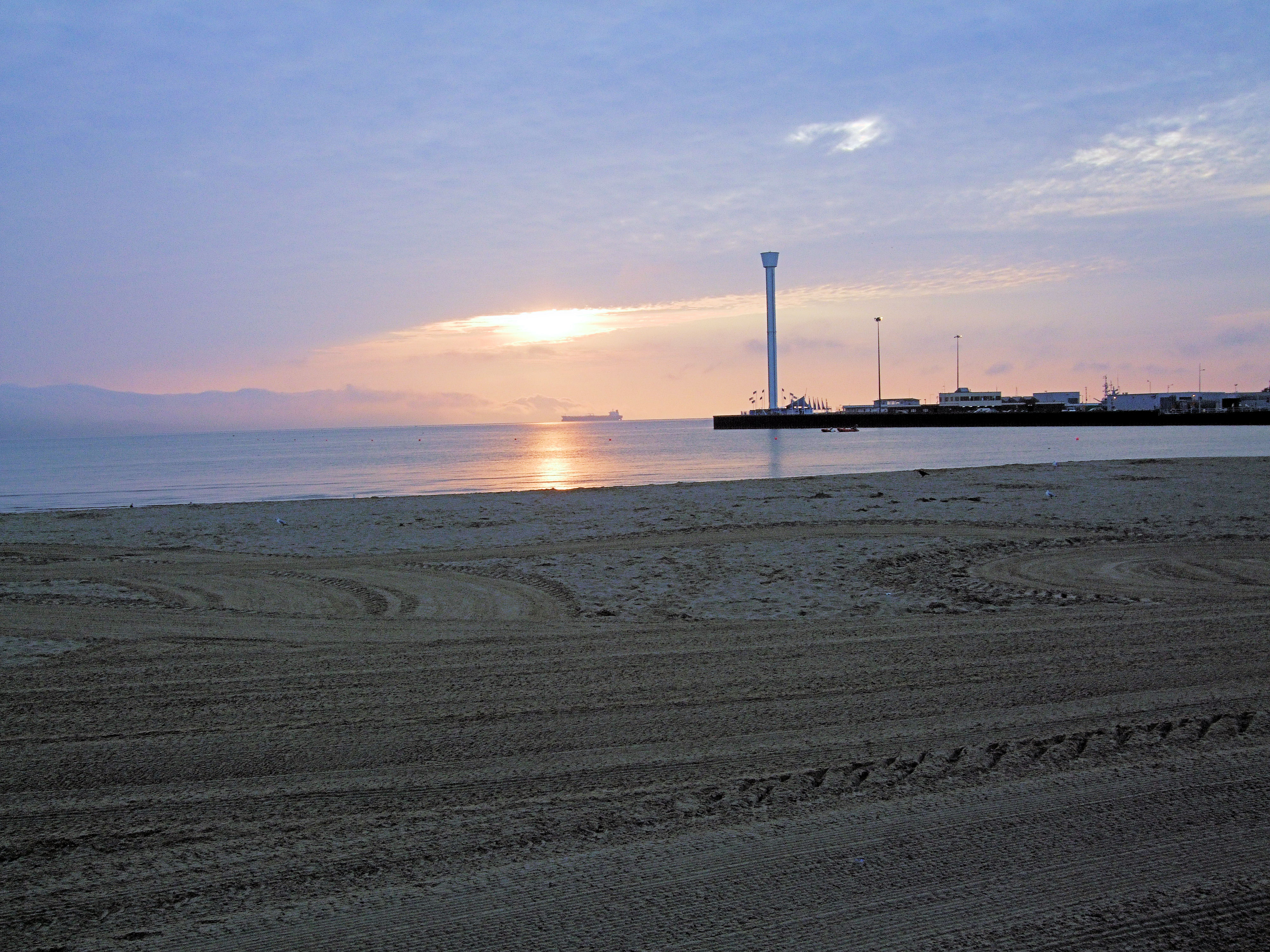
The Jurassic Skyline tower from Weymouth Beach

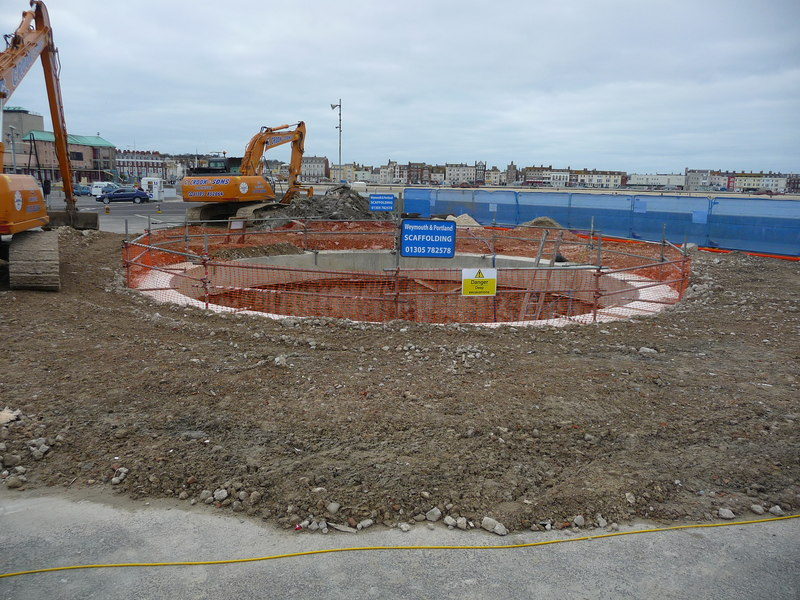
The groundworks of the tower, seen in December 2011

The tower, designed as a temporary tourist attraction, took eight months to build at a cost of £3.5 million. It was designed in Germany and built in Hungary and France, before being shipped in sections to be assembled on site. Work commenced in October 2011, when excavation of the 18-metre deep foundations started. The ground-level reception building was the last part of the tower to be built in June 2012, in time for the Olympic events. The idea of such a tower had been put forward in 2009–10. After a number of sites across Europe were considered, Weymouth was selected due to its far-reaching vistas and its closeness to the Sea Life Park.

The tower had been funded by private money as one of the 90-strong worldwide attraction network operated by the Poole-based Merlin Entertainments, who also own the nearby Sea Life Park and the Pirate Adventure Golf at Lodmoor Country Park. Completed a week ahead of schedule, an early running of the tower was enjoyed by a host of VIP guests, including borough mayor Margaret Leicester, and local councillors and business community representatives.

The tower's original five-year permission was extended in 2017 for a further five years. Thirteen people got stuck up the tower when it malfunctioned on 5 September 2017. They were winched to safety by a coastguard helicopter. Following an investigation, the tower re-opened on 22 October.

After its standard period of closure over the winter period, the tower failed to reopen at the beginning of the peak season in April 2019. Merlin Entertainments later announced on 2 August 2019 that the tower was permanently closed as a result of declining visitor numbers. It was sold to another company and dismantled.

== See also ==
- British Airways i360 tower in Brighton
