= Mitchell College =

Private college in New London, Connecticut, U.S.

- Former name: New London Junior College (1938–1950)
- Type: Private college
- Established: 1938; 88 years ago
- Academic affiliations: NEASC
- Endowment: $6.1 million
- Chairman: Elizabeth Ivey
- President: Tracy Y. Espy
- Faculty: 68
- Students: 572 (fall 2020)
- Location: New London, Connecticut, U.S. 41.3296°N 72.0929°W
- Campus: Suburban, residential, waterfront, 68 acres (28 ha)
- Colors: (Black and red)
- Nickname: Mariners
- Sporting affiliations: NCAA Division III, GNAC
- Website: mitchell.edu

Mitchell College is a private college in New London, Connecticut, United States. In fall 2020 it had an enrollment of 572 students and 68 faculty. Admission rate was 70%. The college offers associate and bachelor's degrees in fourteen subjects.

== History ==
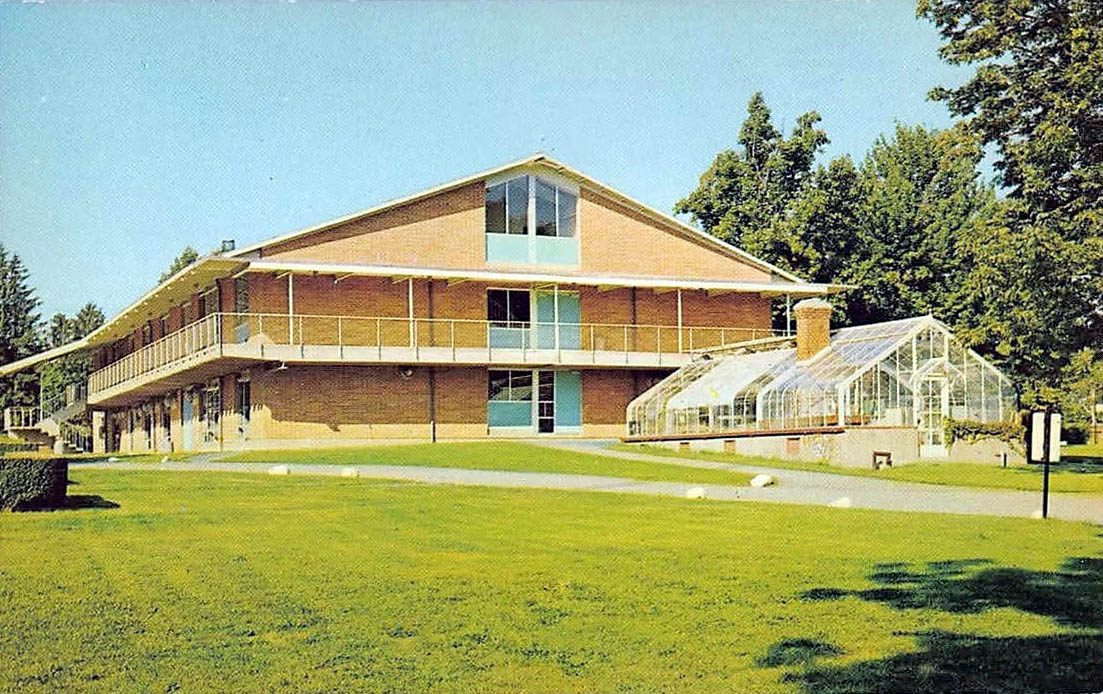
Bingham Hall

The college was originally established in 1938 under the name "New London Junior College". The school adopted its current name, Mitchell College, in 1950.

The college is named after Alfred Mitchell, whose wife Annie Olivia Tiffany Mitchell was a daughter of jeweler and businessman Charles Lewis Tiffany and whose summer home in New London now serves as part of the college's campus.

== Academics ==
Mitchell College reported having 23 full-time faculty, 73 part-time faculty, and 57% of classes having between 10 and 19 students as of 2016. The college offers degrees in business, communication, education, environmental studies, human development and family studies, liberal arts, psychology, criminal justice, and sports and fitness.

== Athletics ==
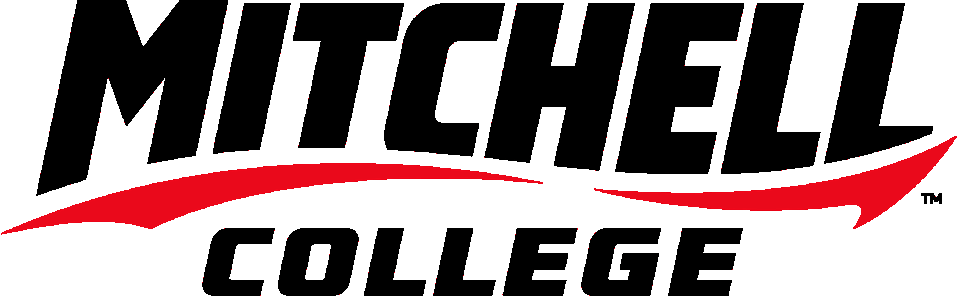
Michell Mariners wordmark

Mitchell College athletic teams are nicknamed the Mariners. The college is a member of the Division III level of the National Collegiate Athletic Association (NCAA), primarily competing in the Great Northeast Athletic Conference (GNAC).

The Mariners compete in eight intercollegiate varsity sports, which are:

Men's sports	Women's sports
Baseball	Basketball
Basketball	Cross country
Cross country	Lacrosse
Golf	Soccer
Lacrosse	Softball
Soccer	Volleyball

== Notable alumni and faculty ==
- Alvin Young (basketball player)
- Rita Williams (basketball player)
- Dan Mara (coach)
- Charlie Kadupski (soccer player)
- Derrick Levasseur (TV personality)
- John Ellis (baseball player)
- Edward Belbruno (mathematician)
