= Esplanade Park =

Esplanade Park may refer to:

- Esplanade Park, Fremantle, a public reserve in Fremantle, Western Australia
- Esplanade Park, Singapore, a park in Downtown Core, Singapore

== See also ==
- Esplanade (disambiguation)
