= Esplanada (disambiguation) =

Esplanada may refer to:

- Esplanada, municipality in the state of Bahia in the North-East region of Brazil
- Esplanada City Center, the name of a future multifunctional city center in Bucharest
- Simca Esplanada was a large car designed by the Brazilian subsidiary of French automaker Simca
- Villa Esplanada, a private housing estate in Hong Kong

== See also ==
- Esplanade (disambiguation)
