= Espy =

Espy may refer to:

== People ==
- Ben Espy (1943–2025), Ohio politician
- Cecil Espy (born 1963), American baseball player
- Chuck Espy (born 1975), American politician
- Duane Espy (born 1952), American baseball figure
- Espy Pilgrim, murder victim
- Espy Van Horne (1795–1829), Pennsylvania politician
- Gene Espy, hiker
- Harriett Newell Espy (1832–1878), American political hostess and letter writer
- Henry Espy, American politician
- James Pollard Espy (1785–1860), American meteorologist
- Kimberly Andrews Espy, American academic administrator and neuropsychologist
- M. Watt Espy (1933–2009), historian
- Mike Espy (born 1953), American politician
- Tracy Y. Espy, U.S. academic administrator
- Willard R. Espy (1910–1999), American writer
- William Gray Espy (born 1948), American actor

== Places ==
- Espy Bog, wetland complex in Columbia County, Pennsylvania
- Espy House, a historic house in Bedford, Pennsylvania
- Espy Run, a tributary of Nanticoke Creek in Luzerne County
- Espy, Pennsylvania, a census-designated place in Columbia County, Pennsylvania, United States

== Other ==
- ESPY Awards, an annual awards ceremony by ESPN
- Espy Sans, a font created by Apple Computer
- ESPY (film), a 1974 Japanese film adaptation of Sakyo Komatsu's novel
- ESPY Photo Award, a biennial international photography competition

== See also ==
- The Espy, a nickname of Esplanade Hotel (Melbourne)
- e-spy (electronic spy), concerning electronic intelligence and cyberespionage
