= Weymouth Beach =

Beach in Dorset, England

- Beach
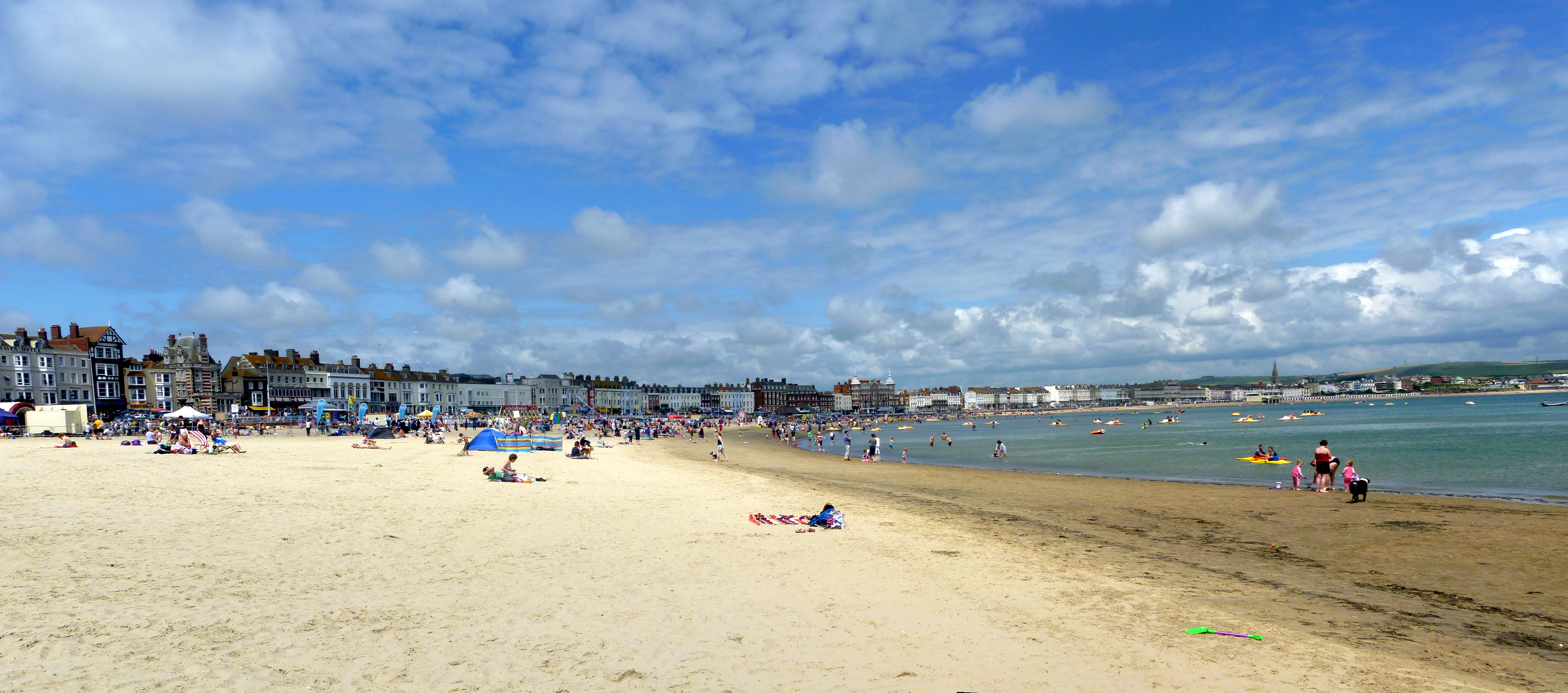
- Weymouth beach in July 2011
- Interactive map of Weymouth Beach
- Coordinates: 50.6113°N 2.4525°W
- Location: Weymouth
- Access: The Esplanade

Weymouth Beach is a gently curving arc of sand in Weymouth Bay, beside the town of Weymouth in Dorset, England. Immediately adjacent to the beach is The Esplanade.

The beach is very wide and gently sloping, with golden sand and shallow waters normally with small waves, making it a popular destination for beachgoing and sea bathing. Beginning in 1789, Weymouth was frequented by King George III after he was advised to take the waters after his first bout of porphyria. The king named Weymouth his 'first resort' and made bathing fashionable there.

The expansive beach has provided a venue for Weymouth Beach Motocross since 1984, and an annual volleyball tournament since 1983.

The beach has the traditional attractions of an English seaside resort, including (during the summer season) donkey rides, Punch and Judy, sand sculptures, trampolines, a small funfair for children, and pedalo hire.

At the southern end is Weymouth Pier, including the Pavilion Theatre and Weymouth Sea Life Tower. At the northeastern end is the suburb of Greenhill, with Furzy Cliff and Bowleaze Cove beyond that.

The beach was voted Number 1 in The Times and Sunday Times Best UK Beaches 2023.

== Gallery ==
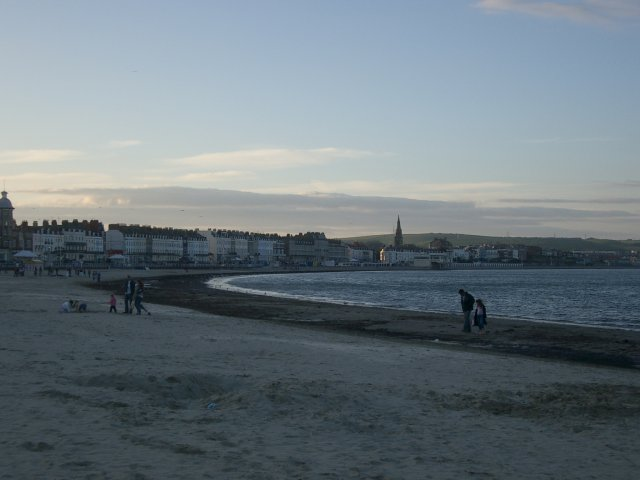
View of Weymouth Beach.

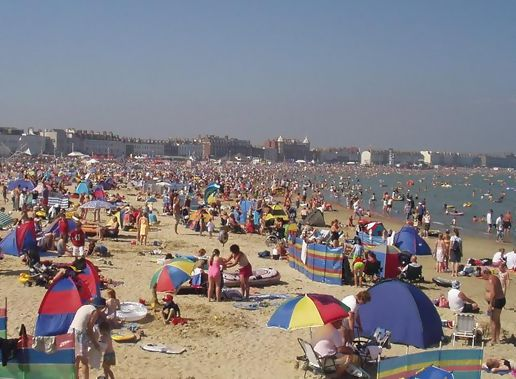
Weymouth Beach as seen from the south on the town's carnival day.

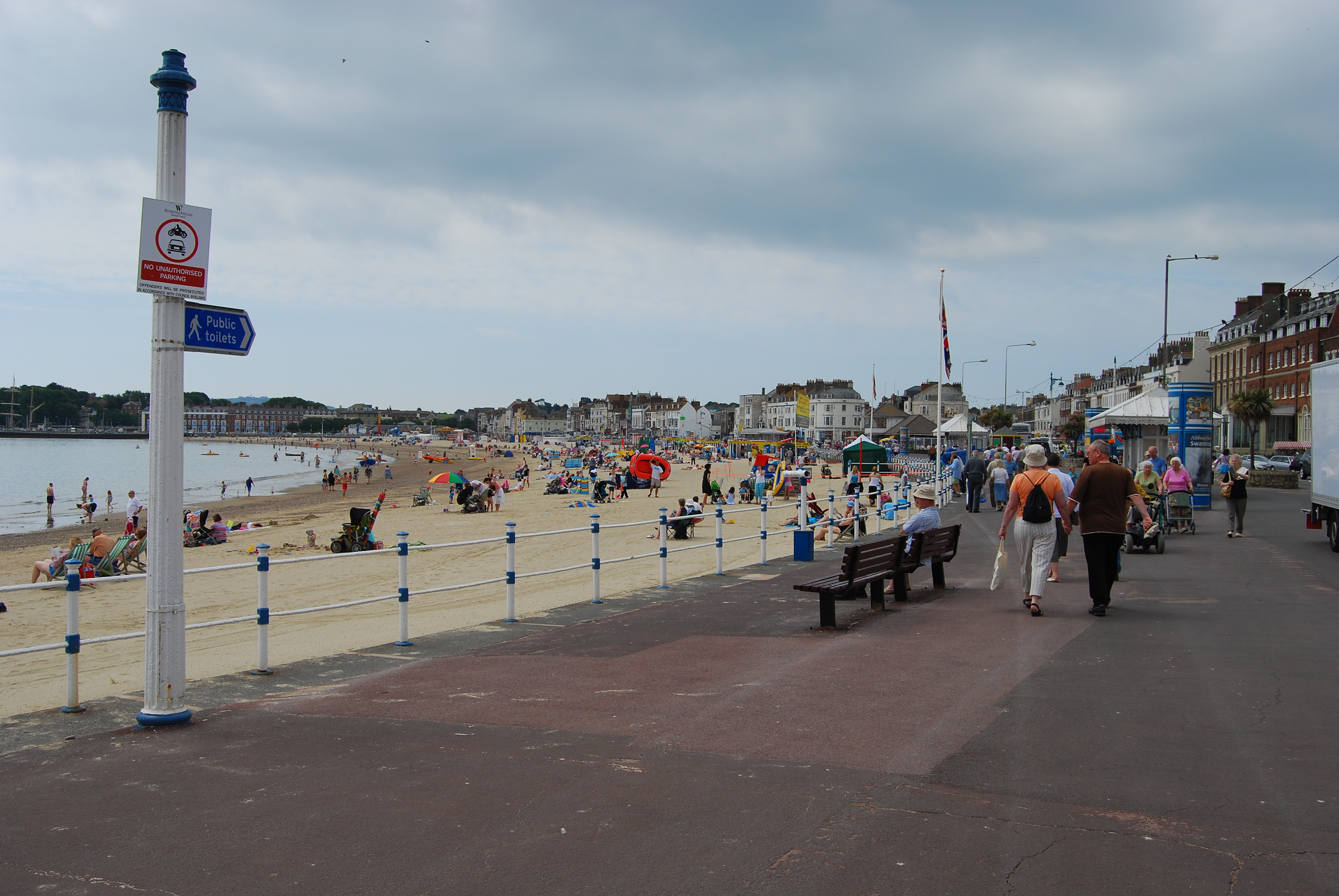
View of the beach looking south from The Esplanade.

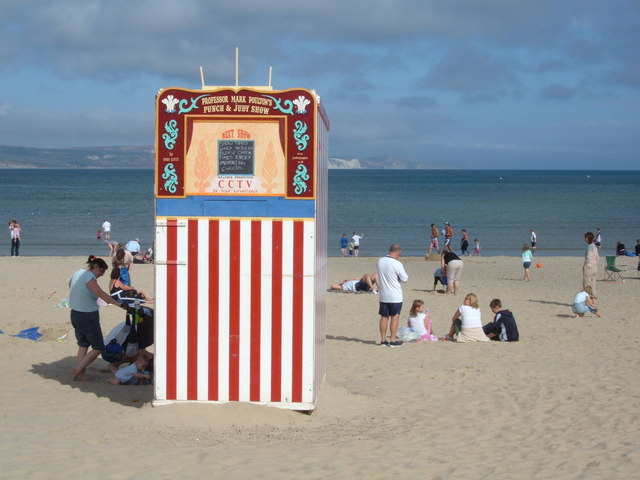
Punch and Judy on Weymouth Beach.

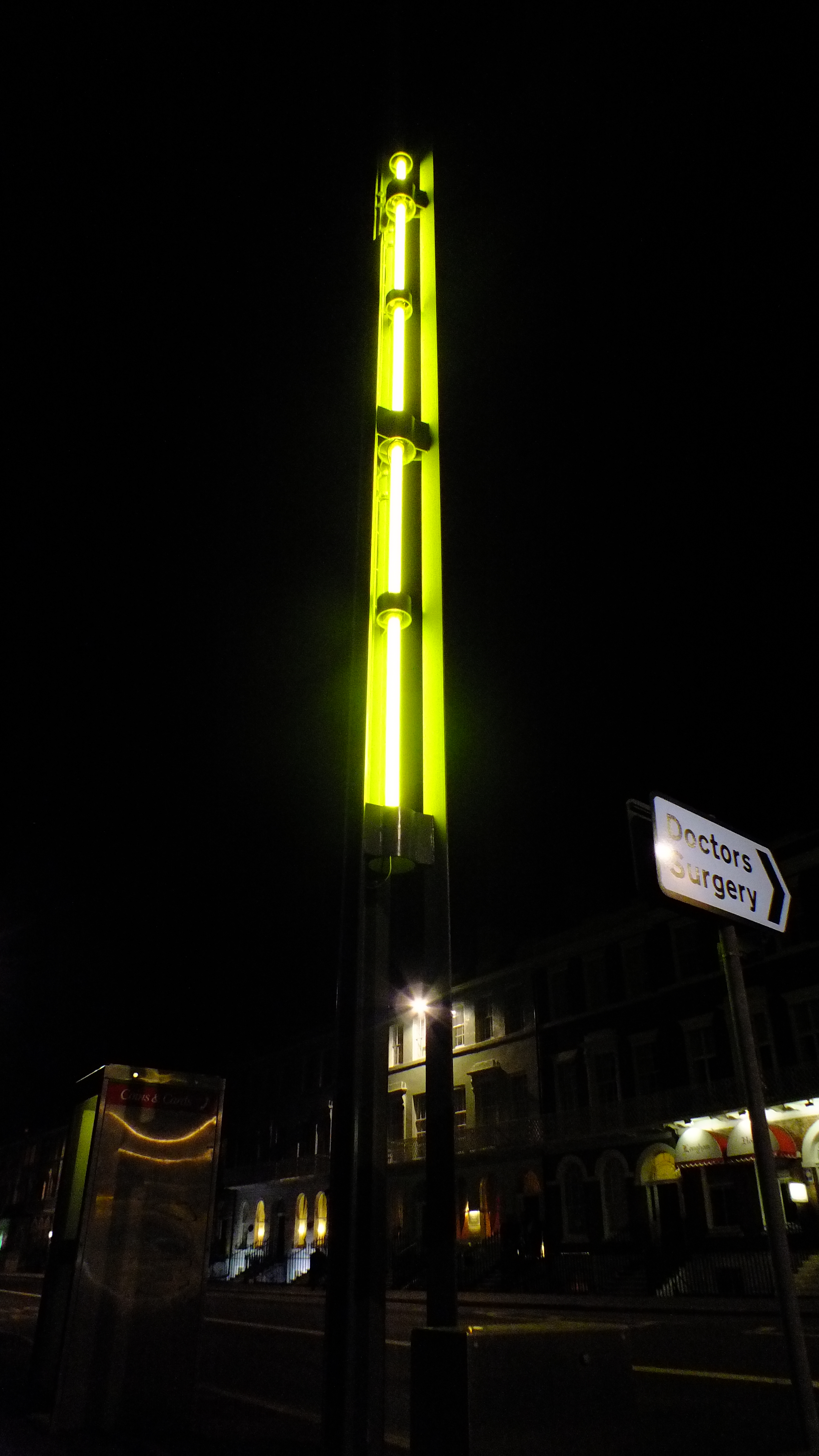
Weymouth Beach Laser

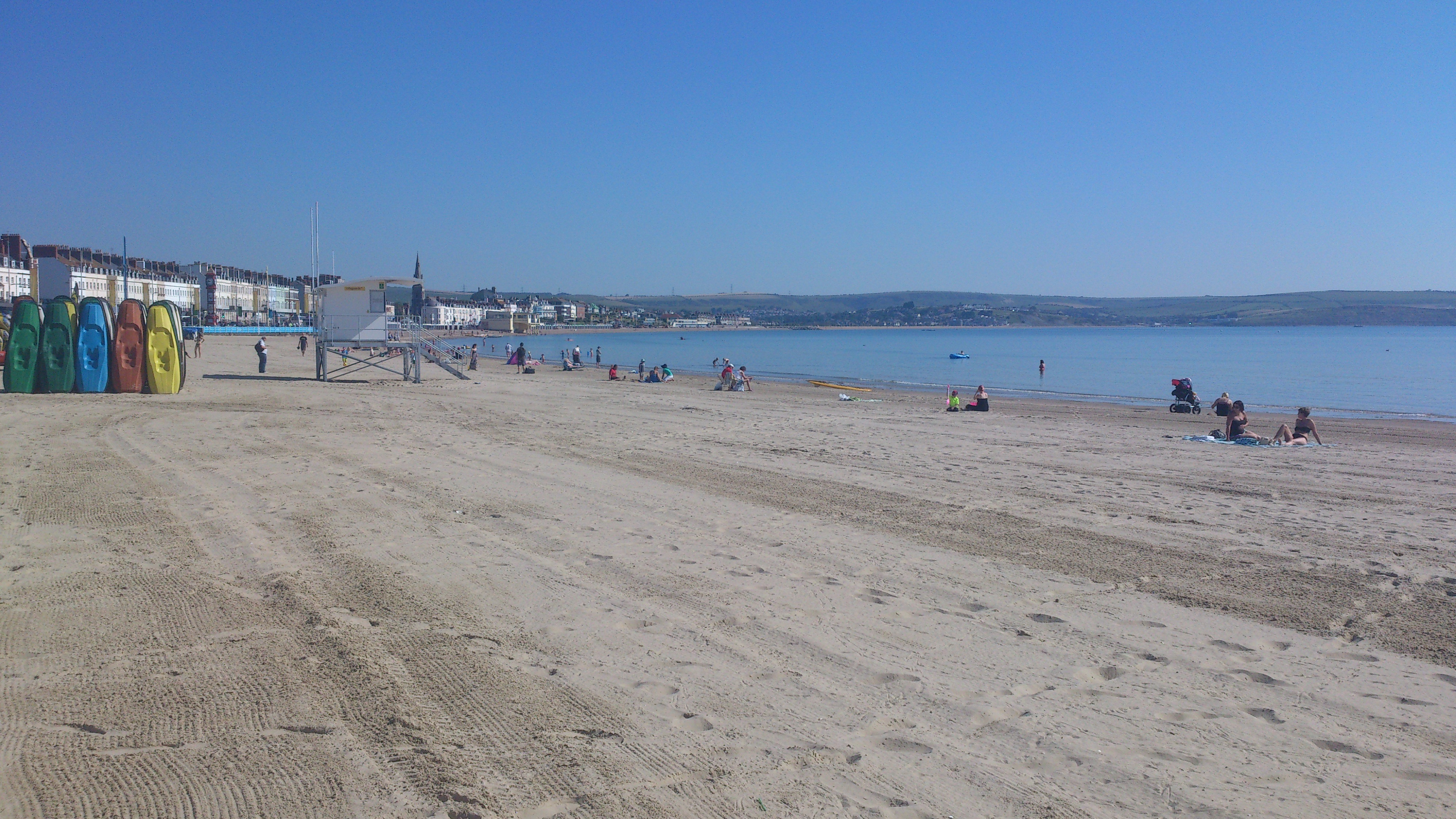
View of Weymouth Beach in 2012.

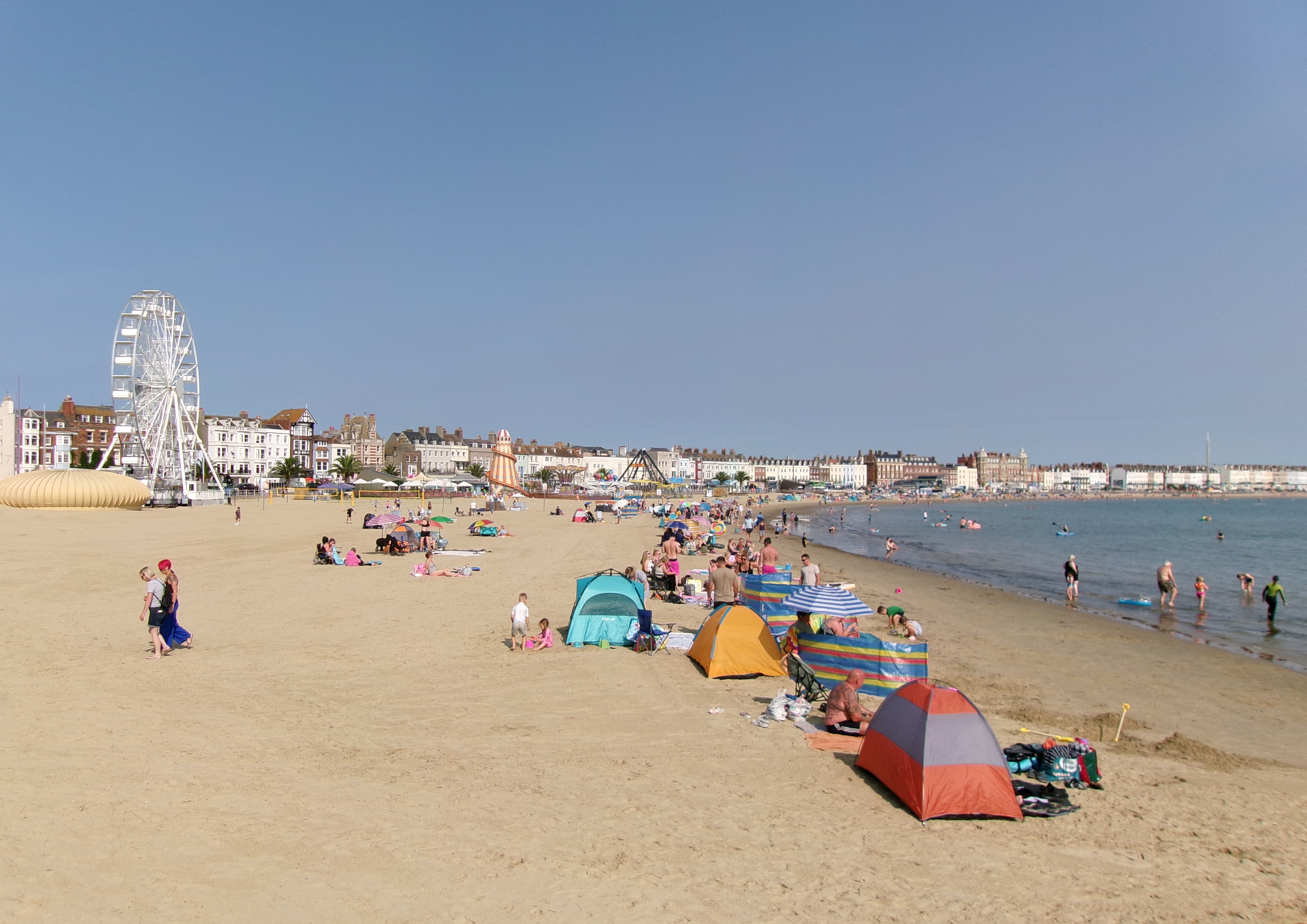
Weymouth beach in August 2025

== See also ==
- List of Dorset beaches
- Weymouth Bay
