= Indaziflam =

Preemergent herbicide discovered in 2009

Names
- IUPAC name 2-N-[(1R,2S)-2,6-dimethyl-2,3-dihydro-1H-inden-1-yl]-6-(1-fluoroethyl)-1,3,5-triazine-2,4-diamine

Identifiers
CAS Number	950782-86-2
3D model (JSmol)	Interactive image
Beilstein Reference	20920435
ChEBI	CHEBI:133237
ChemSpider	21442049
ECHA InfoCard	100.216.692
PubChem CID	44146693
UNII	M64ZDU291E
CompTox Dashboard (EPA)	DTXSID0058223
- InChI: InChI=1S/C16H20FN5/c1-8-4-5-11-7-9(2)13(12(11)6-8)19-16-21-14(10(3)17)20-15(18)22-16/h4-6,9-10,13H,7H2,1-3H3,(H3,18,19,20,21,22)/t9-,10?,13+/m0/s1 Key: YFONKFDEZLYQDH-BOURZNODSA-N
- SMILES: C[C@H]1CC2=C([C@@H]1NC3=NC(=NC(=N3)N)C(C)F)C=C(C=C2)C

Properties
Chemical formula	C_{16}H_{20}FN_{5}
Molar mass	301.369 g·mol^{−1}
Density	1.23 g/mL
Melting point	183 °C (361 °F; 456 K)
Solubility in water	2.8 mg/L (20 °C)
log P	2.8

Hazards
- GHS labelling
Pictograms	(GHS08: Health hazard) (GHS09: Environmental hazard)
Signal word	Warning
Hazard statements	H373, H410
Precautionary statements	P260, P273, P314, P391, P501
- Except where otherwise noted, data are given for materials in their standard state (at 25 °C [77 °F], 100 kPa). Infobox references

Indaziflam is a preemergent herbicide used especially for grass control in tree and bush crops.

== History ==
In 1991, the Japanese company Idemitsu Kosan filed a patent to 2-amino 6-fluoroalkyl triazine derivatives as herbicides. One of these compounds was subsequently given the ISO common name triaziflam but had limited success as a commercial herbicide. Bayer scientists subsequently investigated this area of chemistry and identified indaziflam as having superior properties, which they patented and developed under the code number BCS-AA10717. The compound was first registered for use in the USA in 2010.

== Mechanism of action ==
Indaziflam is an inhibitor of cellulose biosynthesis. This mechanism of action was theorized to be responsible for indaziflam's effect in 2009 and proven in 2014. The cellulose biosynthesis inhibitors (CBIs) are identified as Group 29 (Aus: Group O, WSSA: Group L) by the Weed Science Society of America/Herbicide Resistance Action Committee.

== Resistance ==
As of March 2021 there are no resistant populations known and none for the broader CBI class (discounting quinclorac).

== Brand names ==
Indaziflam composes all or part of the active ingredients of several herbicides from Bayer Environmental Science (now owned by Cinven), including Rejuvra, the Esplanade line (sometimes mixed with diquat dibromide and glyphosate isopropylamine), Marengo, Specticle, and Bayer CropScience (the inventor of the ingredient), like Alion.

== Uses ==
Indaziflam is approved in the United States for hops, Rubus spp., Coffea spp., bushberries, tropical crops, drupes/stone fruit, and tree nuts. It is used as a preemergent.
