= Esplanada City Center =

General information
- Construction started: Never
- Estimated completion: Never
- Opening: Never

Height
- Antenna spire: ~250 m (820 ft) (the highest of the skyscrapers)
- Roof: ~210 m (690 ft) (the highest of the skyscrapers)

Technical details
- Floor count: 70
- Floor area: 880,000 m^{2} (9,472,241 sq ft)

Design and construction
- Architects: Murphy & Jahn
- Developer: TriGránit

The Esplanada City Center was supposed to be a future multifunctional city center in Bucharest situated on the Unirii Boulevard not far from the Palace of the Parliament. Esplanada would have been used for shopping, living, working and leisure functions integrated into a mixed-use urban community.

The Romanian state approved the Esplanada City Center Project at first. TriGranit was to start construction works on the Esplanada Project in the second half of 2009. The government approved this project by allowing a Private-Public Partnership. The entire project was to become property of the Romanian state after 49 years of partnership, and at the end of the partnership TriGranit would have the option to buy the complex. Nevertheless, this whole project was cancelled in 2011.

== Description ==
The entire project was envisioned as a small city with shopping, living, working and leisure functions integrated into one enormous complex developed on an area of 107,140 square meters.

The project included 8 skyscrapers from 30 to 70 floors, a Guggenheim Museum, a shopping mall and many green areas.

The tallest of the skyscrapers would have had a roof with a height of 210 m (250 with the spire). There would also have been a unique building shaped in the form of the Romanian sculptor Constantin Brâncuși's Endless Column.

The whole building complex including the mall would have had a price tag of around US$4.2 billion and it was to be paid by TriGranit and the Rothschild family.

== See also ==
- TriGranit
