= Weymouth Pavilion =

Theatre in Weymouth, Dorset, England (1960-)

Coordinates: 50.609°N 2.447°W

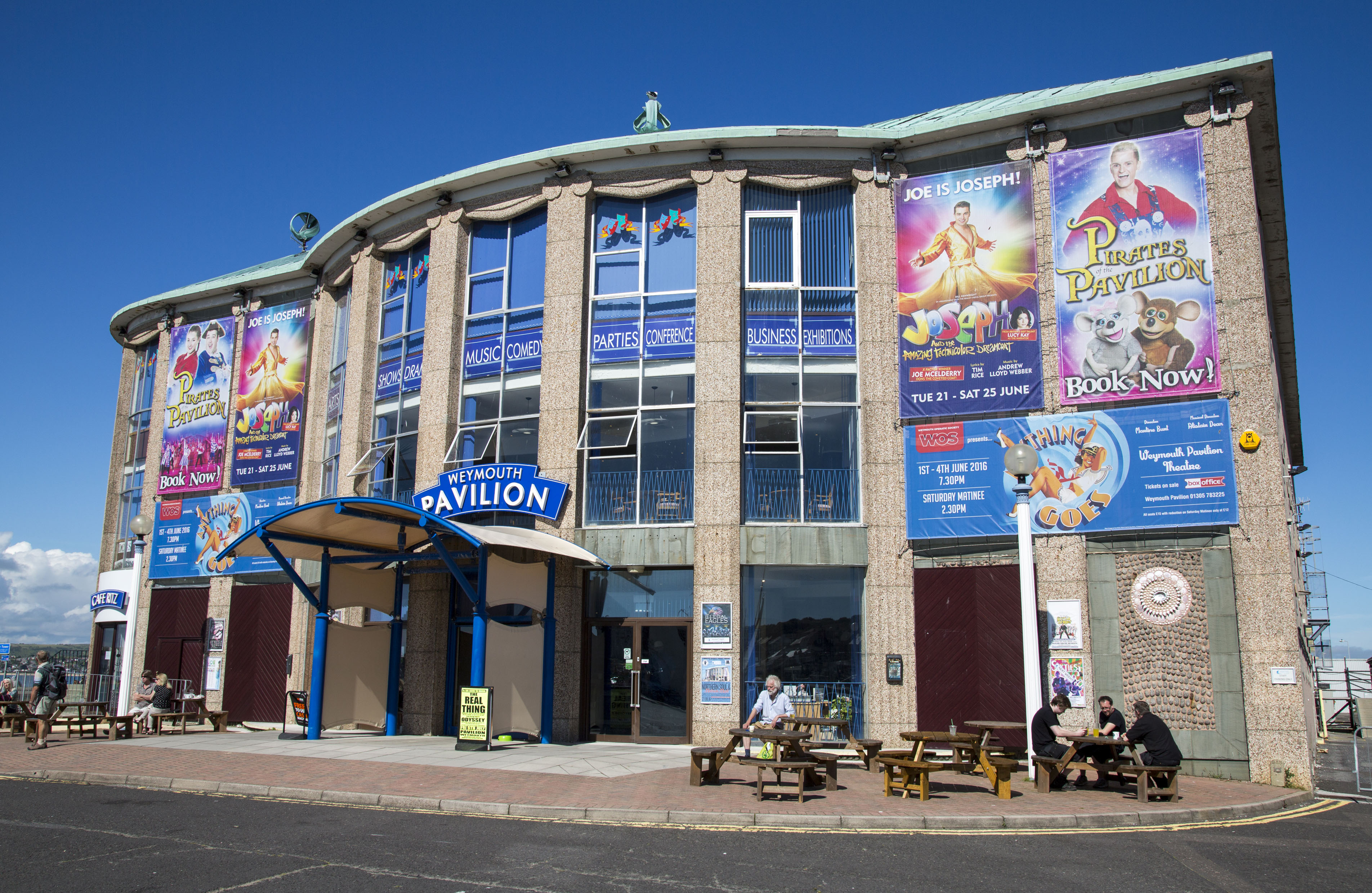
- Weymouth Pavilion, July 2016
- Interactive map of Weymouth Pavilion
- Former names: The Ritz
- Address: The Esplanade; Weymouth DT4 8ED; England
- Operator: Weymouth Pavilion CIC
- Capacity: 988 (Theatre); 600 (Ocean Room)

Construction
- Opened: 21 December 1908
- Closed: 23 April 1954 (destroyed by fire)
- Reopened: 15 July 1960; 13 July 2013

Website
- www.weymouthpavilion.com

The Weymouth Pavilion, formerly the Ritz, is a theatre in Weymouth, Dorset, England. The complex contains a 988-seat theatre, 600-capacity ballroom known as the Ocean Room, the Piano Bar restaurant, Ritz Cafe, and other function and meeting rooms.

The original pavilion, constructed in 1908, was destroyed in a fire in 1954, and the current theatre was built in its place in 1958. It was owned and operated by Weymouth & Portland Borough Council until 2013 and is now operated by a not-for-profit Community Interest Company. The theatre is located at the end of The Esplanade between Weymouth Harbour and Weymouth Beach.

== History ==
=== The Pavilion and The Ritz (1908–1954) ===
The original pavilion was built in response to Weymouth's increasing popularity as a seaside resort. Following calls for an entertainment venue, a site at the southern end of the Esplanade was chosen, and an architectural competition was launched in 1907 for the design of the theatre. It was built in 1908 of timber, with a steel frame, for a cost of £14,150, which included the reclamation of land on the esplanade. It was officially opened on 21 December 1908. In 1914, the council began leasing the theatre to Ernest Wheeler, who continued to run it for twenty-five years. It later saw competition with the opening of the Alexandra Gardens Theatre in 1924. In response, the pavilion also began screening films.

The pavilion was requisitioned by the military during World War II and was largely used by the newly-formed No. 4 Commando. During 1940, it was used to house 800 Moroccans from the French army and was then later used as a medical centre during the evacuation of the Channel Islands. The pavilion saw bomb damage in an air raid during April 1942 and was afterwards taken over by the Admiralty, who retained it as a naval post sorting office until 1947.

In 1947, the council leased the venue to the Buxton Theatre Circuit. After a new cinema projection room was installed in 1949, the tenants reopened the theatre as The Ritz in May 1950. A new management company, Melcombe Productions, took over the venue in September 1951. Later in January 1954, some restoration work began on the building, including the renewal of the roof and the redecorating of its wooden exterior. However, on 13 April 1954, the building caught fire, which destroyed much of the building within an hour. The fire was attributed to the misuse of a blowlamp and the damage costs were estimated to be around £80,000. The council claimed on the venue's fire insurance policy, and its remains were demolished.

=== Weymouth Pavilion (1958–1960) ===
After much debate, the construction of a new theatre and ballroom began in September 1958. The design plans were drawn up by Samuel Beverley. After running a competition to name the new venue in 1959, the council decided on Weymouth Pavilion against The Normandy. The pavilion, which had cost £154,000 to build, was officially opened on 15 July 1960. The ballroom had opened shortly before this.

== Redevelopment schemes (2006–2012) ==
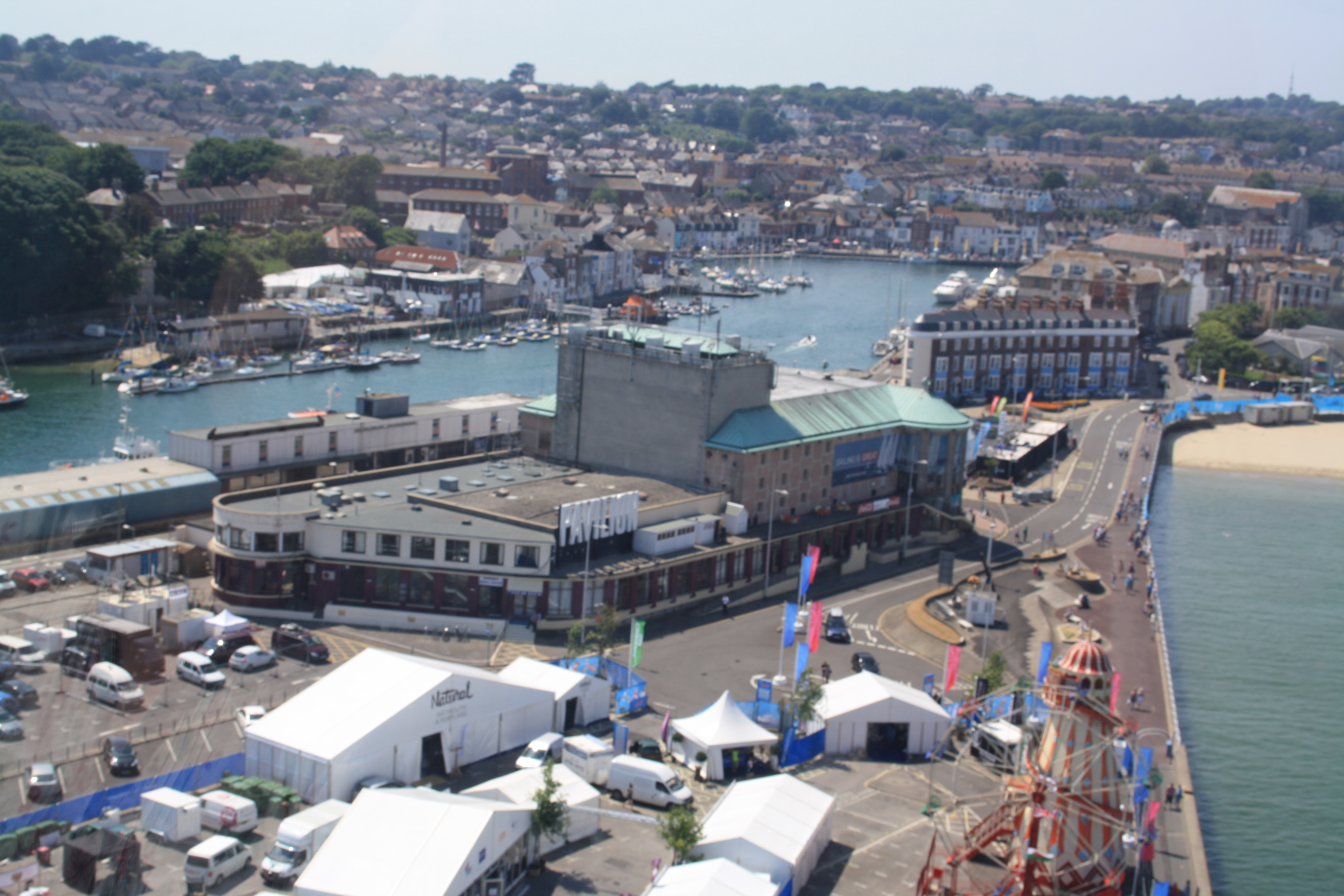
The rear of Weymouth Pavilion and Weymouth Harbour during the Summer 2012 Olympics.

It was announced in 2006 that the pavilion and its surroundings would be redeveloped as part of a £135-million redevelopment scheme from 2007 to 2011, in time for the 2012 Olympic Games. The 4-hectare (10-acre) site was planned to include a new theatre, a World Heritage Site visitor centre, a new ferry terminal, a hotel, an undercover car park, a shopping arcade, apartments and a marina. However, the scheme was cancelled in 2009 due to the economic recession.

In 2012, Jeffrey Heintz of London-based designers White Knight proposed a new £160-million redevelopment plan, stating that his team could transform the pavilion into a "flourishing one" under a trust and save taxpayers thousands of pounds. However, the onset of the 2012 Olympic Games prevented any redevelopment scheme from going ahead.

=== Closure and community handover (2012–present) ===
In 2012, The Borough Council announced it was considering options for cost-saving on the Pavilion site. Later that year, they announced the possible option of demolishing the pavilion and replacing it with a car park. In response, local campaigners launched a petition. Further talks by the council in 2013 considered the pavilion's future. Some of the options included demolishing it, leasing it to a community interest company or selling the building.

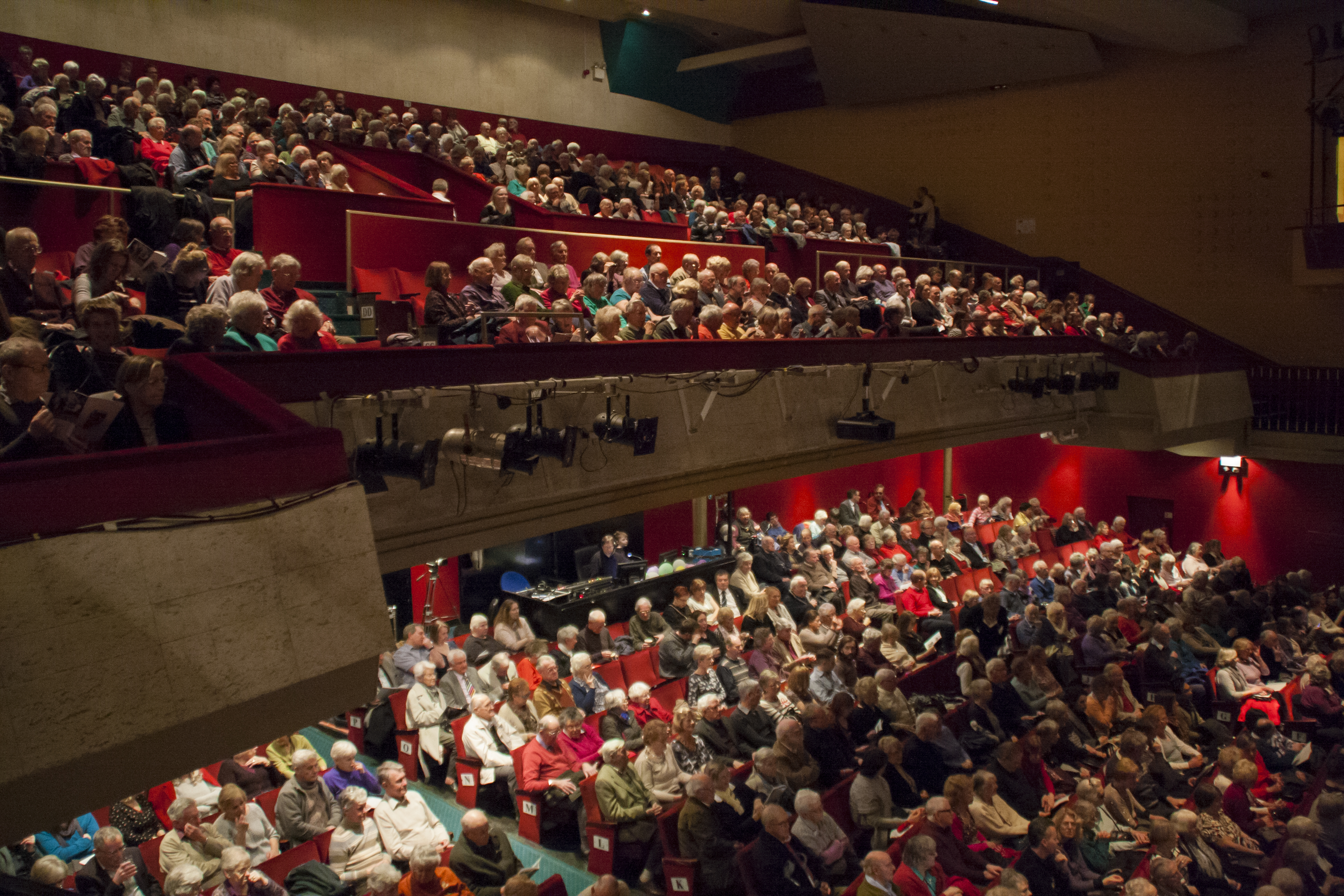
The Pavilion auditorium during a performance from the Bournemouth Symphony Orchestra in Jan 2015.

It was recommended that the pavilion should be handed over to the community as opposed to demolition. After the official decision was made on 21 February 2013, the council called for bids to manage the venue for community use. Following a formal tender process the Pavilion was closed on 13 May 2013. The following month saw the announcement that local businessman Phil Say had been successful in bidding to run the theatre as a nonprofit business operated by a newly formed Community Interest Company. The new lease was signed on 5 July 2013, and Weymouth Pavilion reopened to the public on 13 July 2013.

In January 2015, it was revealed that the pavilion's figures had more than doubled under its new management, having in excess of 300,000 visitors and selling over 60,000 tickets in 2014. The following January saw the pavilion's most commercially successful show, the Christmas pantomime Snow White, which topped box office records set by the previous year's pantomime Aladdin.
