= Tracy Y. Espy =

8th President of Mitchell College
- Incumbent
- Assumed office July 1, 2020

Personal details
- Education: Berea College; Miami University; Syracuse University

Tracy Y. Espy is a U.S. academic administrator and expert on human development and family therapy serving as the eighth president of Mitchell College since 2020. She was previously the provost and vice president of academic affairs at Pfeiffer University.

== Life ==
Espy was raised outside Birmingham, Alabama. She completed a bachelor's degree at Berea College. She earned a Master of Science in family studies from Miami University and a Ph.D. in child/family-marriage and family therapy from Syracuse University. During a residency in behavioral medicine, Espy shifted from clinical practice to teaching, research, and administration. Espy's research has addressed systemic theory, ethnic identity and self-esteem, servant leadership, service-learning, and student engagement.

Espy is an academic administrator and expert on human development and family therapy. She worked at Pfeiffer University where she led the Francis Center for Servant Leadership and student leadership groups before overseeing all academic programs as the provost and vice president of academic affairs.

On July 1, 2020, she became the 8th president of Mitchell College, the first African American woman to serve in the role.
