= The Esplanade, Weymouth =

Street in Weymouth, United Kingdom

The Esplanade
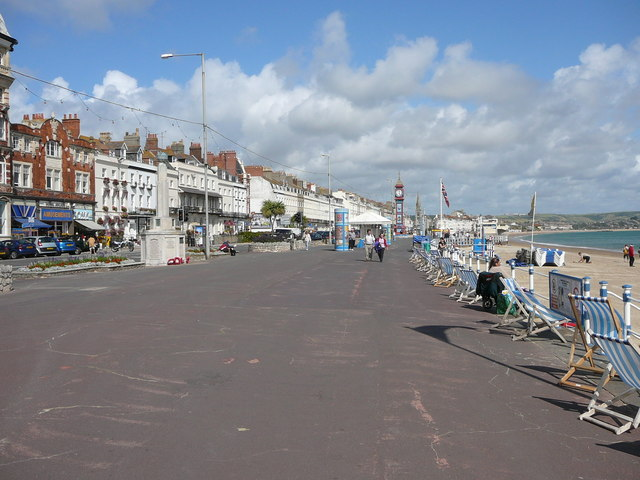
- The Esplanade, Weymouth looking towards Jubilee Clock
- Interactive map of The Esplanade
- Length: 1.3 mi (2.1 km)
- Location: Weymouth, England
- Postal code: DT4
- Coordinates: 50.6128°N 2.4532°W
- south end: Weymouth Ferry Terminal
- north end: Preston Road

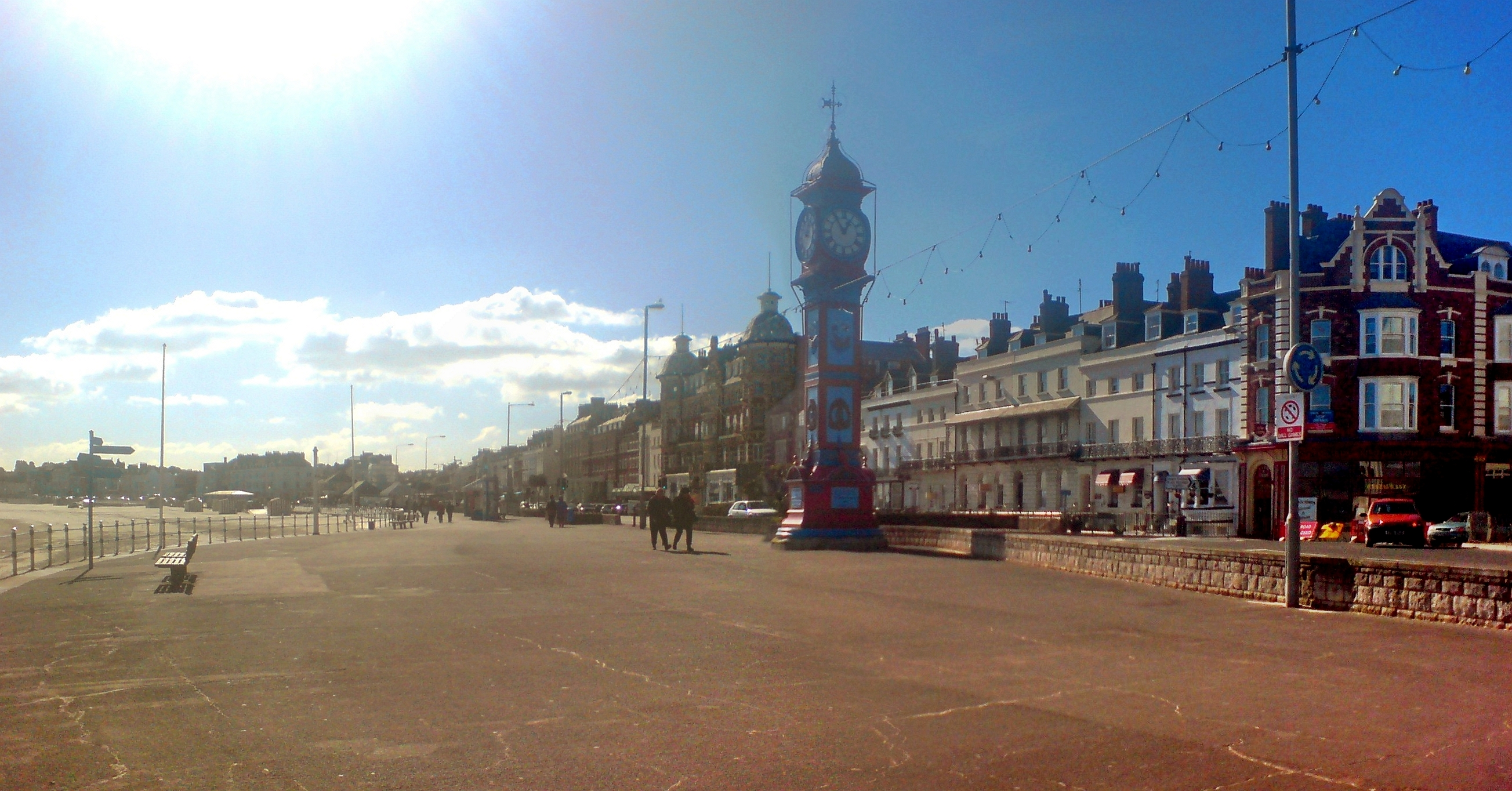
View of the Esplanade, including the Victorian Jubilee Clock.

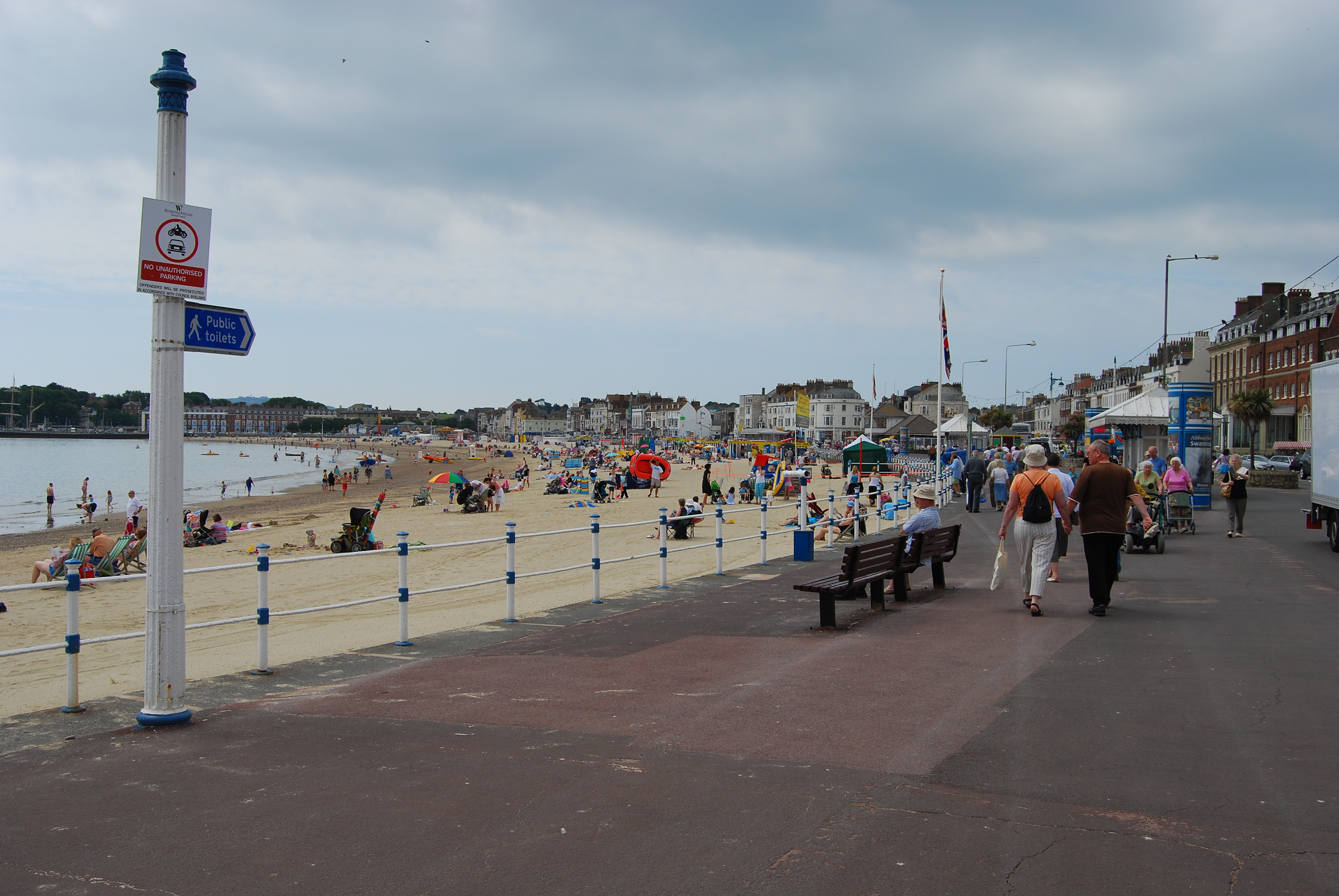
View of Weymouth Beach from the Esplanade.

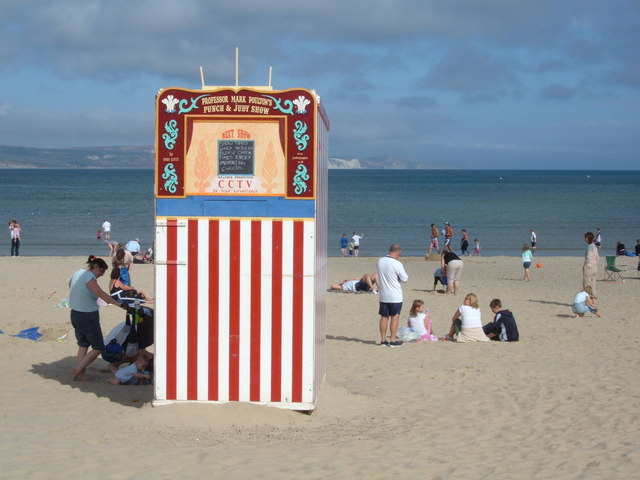
Punch and Judy on the beach viewed from the Esplanade.

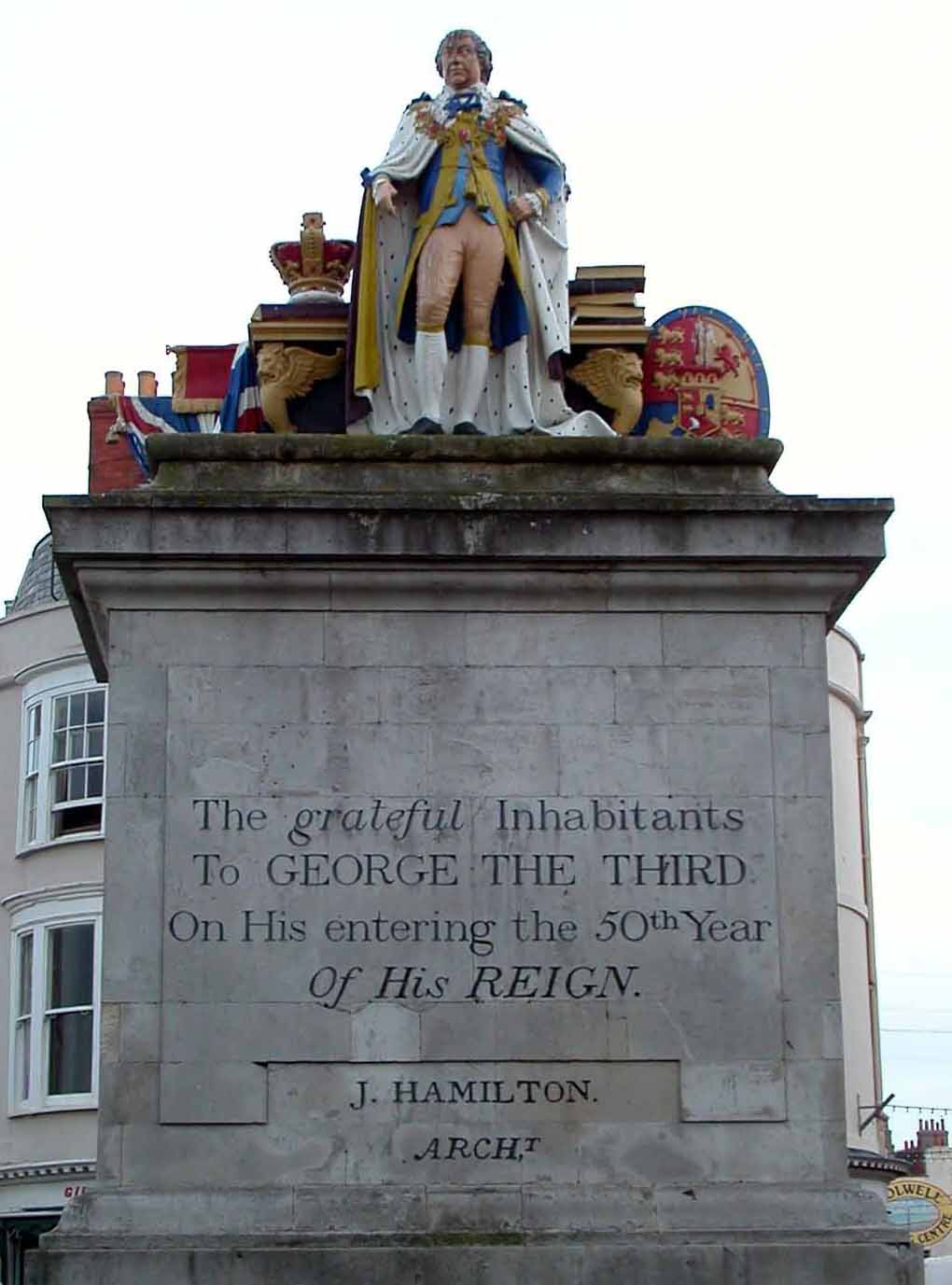
Statue of King George III on the Esplanade - "King's Statue".

The Esplanade is a wide walkway and street on the seafront at Weymouth, Dorset on the south coast of England.

== Overview ==
The Esplanade is immediately next to the sandy Weymouth Beach. To the south at the end of the Esplanade are Weymouth Pier, the (now defunct) Condor Ferries terminal for ferry service to the Channel Islands and the Pavilion Theatre. Also towards the south is King's Statue - a statue of King George III who visited Weymouth and helped to make sea bathing fashionable here. The inscription reads:

The grateful Inhabitants

To GEORGE THE THIRD
On His entering the 50th Year
Of His REIGN.

J. HAMILTON

ARCH.^{T}

The Jubilee Clock is a brightly painted and very visible feature on the Esplanade. It was erected in 1887 to mark the Golden jubilee of Queen Victoria. To the north is the Queen Victoria Statue, St John's Church and the suburb of Greenhill.

There are a number of tourist-oriented shops on the Esplanade, together with many guest houses, hotels, and places to eat. These include the long-established Rossi's Ices, which started trading in 1937.

== Redevelopment ==
As part of the regeneration of Weymouth and Portland, it was decided in 2007 that the Esplanade will be redeveloped in time for the 2012 Olympic Games.

The scheme could include the restoration and extension the Pier Bandstand at the northern end of the Esplanade. The exterior's Art Deco features and symmetry would be restored, the ground floor converted into a café, restaurant and toilet facilities, and the upper floor extended out to sea with a curved wooden deck. The area in front of the bandstand would be redesigned into a 1930s-style square, as the northern gateway to the Esplanade.

== See also ==
- Esplanade
