= Esplanade Mall =

Esplanade Mall may refer to

- The Esplanade (Kenner, Louisiana)
- Esplanade Mall (Oxnard, California)
