= Alexandra Gardens Theatre =

Theatre in Weymouth, England

Coordinates: 50°36′30″N 2°27′06″W

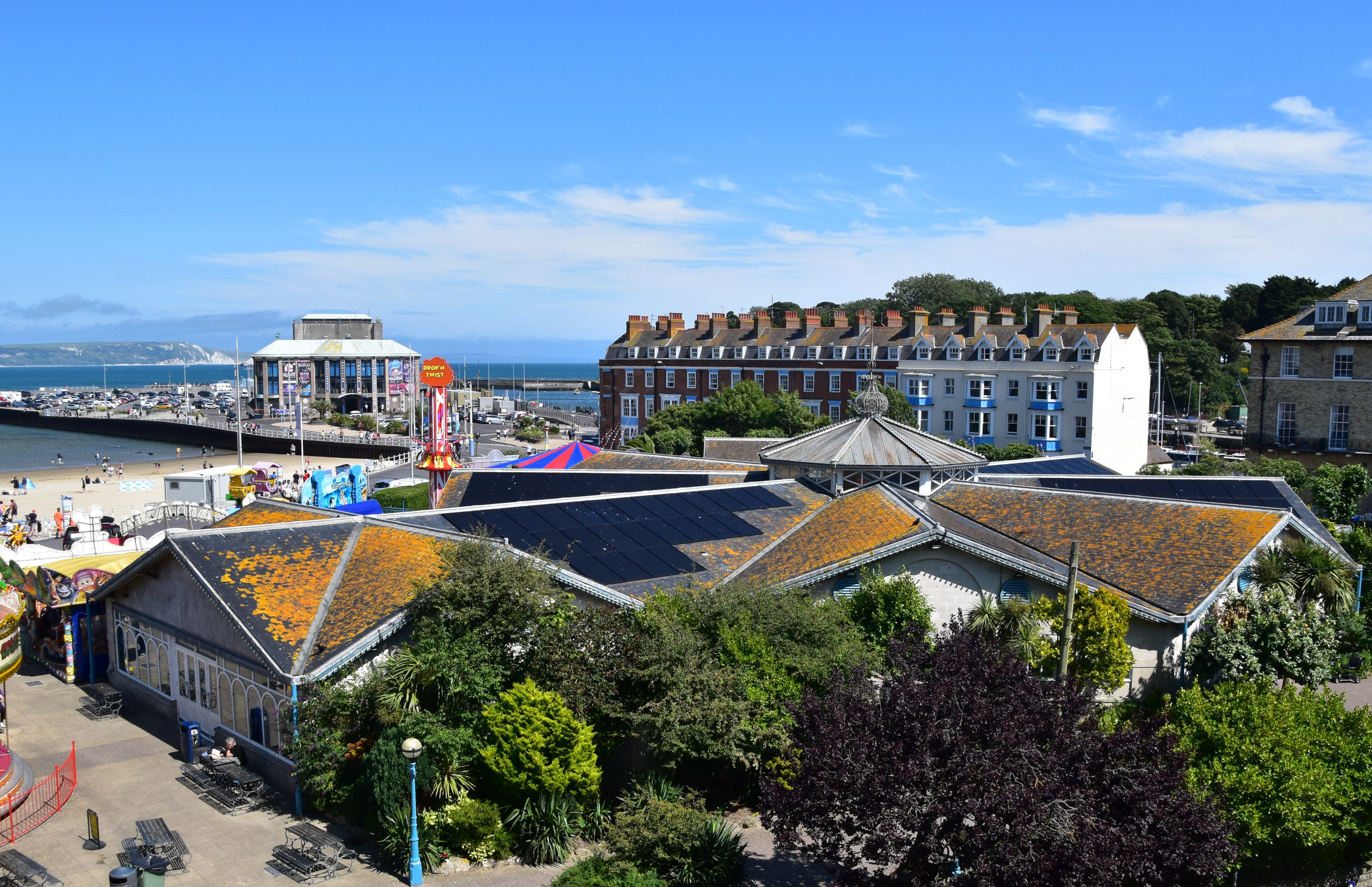
Electric Palace, built on the former site of the theatre.

Alexandra Gardens Theatre was a theatre at Weymouth, Dorset, England. Originally known as the Alexandra Gardens Concert Hall, it was opened in 1924 and later converted into an amusement arcade in 1963. The building was destroyed by fire in 1993 and replaced with a new building which is still in use as the Electric Palace Amusement Arcade.

== History ==
The site of the theatre was originally reclaimed land used for grazing since the early 19th century. In 1869, the site was transformed and opened as New Gardens, and later renamed Alexandra Gardens in 1880. In 1913, the gardens' bandstand of 1891 was enclosed within a building of glass to form the Kursaal, allowing audiences to enjoy band performances in all weathers. During World War I, the Kursaal served as a reception centre for injured soldiers of the Australian and New Zealand Army Corps (ANZAC) who were accommodated in local camps following the Gallipoli Campaign. The Kursaal was later demolished and replaced by the Weymouth Corporation with the Alexandra Gardens Concert Hall, which was opened on 7 June 1924 by the Mayor of Weymouth. The gardens' bandstand was relocated to Nothe Gardens. The hall was requisitioned for military use during World War II and reopened again in 1945.

The hall, later renamed Alexandra Gardens Theatre, closed in 1963 and was taken over by Holland Leisure, who converted it into the Electric Palace Amusement Arcade. The building was destroyed by a fire in 1993 and replaced with a new family leisure and amusement centre by Holland Leisure. Planning permission was approved in November 1993, and the building was built to resemble the shape of the Kursaal.
