= List of churches in Weymouth and Portland =

The following is a list of notable churches in Weymouth and Portland.

== List ==
- All Saints Church, Portland
- All Saints Church, Wyke Regis
- Avalanche Memorial Church
- Easton Methodist Church, Portland
- Holy Trinity Church, Weymouth
- Hope United Reformed Church, Weymouth
- St Aldhelm's Church, Radipole
- St Ann's Church, Radipole
- St Joseph's Church, Weymouth
- St John's Church, Portland
- St John's Church, Weymouth
- St Laurence's Church, Upwey
- St Mary's Church, Weymouth
- St Nicholas' Church, Broadwey
- St Paul's Church, Weymouth
- Weymouth Baptist Church
- Weymouth Bay Methodist Church

=== Closed churches ===
- Broadwey Methodist Church
- Church of Our Lady and St Andrew, Portland
- Maiden Street Methodist Church
- Southwell Methodist Chapel
- St Andrew's Church, Portland
- St George's Church, Portland
- St Martin's Church, Weymouth
- St Peter's Church, Portland
- Underhill Methodist Church, Portland
- United Reformed Church, Portland
- United Reformed Church, Upwey
- Wyke Regis Methodist Church

=== Demolished churches ===
- Christ Church, Weymouth
- Gloucester Street Congregational Church, Weymouth
