= Grade II* listed buildings in Weymouth and Portland =

Weymouth and Portland shown in Dorset

There are over 20,000 Grade II* listed buildings in England. This page is a list of these buildings in the former district of Weymouth and Portland in the county of Dorset.

== Buildings ==
Name	Location	Type	Completed (Note: The date given is the date used by Historic England as significant for the initial building or that of an important part in the structure's description.)	Date designated	Grid ref. (Note: Sometimes known as OSGB36, the grid reference is based on the British national grid reference system used by the Ordnance Survey.) Geo-coordinates	Entry number (Note: The "List Entry Number" is a unique number assigned to each listed building and scheduled monument by Historic England.)	Image
Captain's House	Castletown, Portland	House	Between 1816 and 1835	17 May 1993	SY6843574359; 50°34′05″N 2°26′49″W	1280817	Upload Photo
Church of St Peter	The Grove, Portland	Anglican church	1872	21 September 1978	SY6988972581; 50°33′08″N 2°25′35″W	1205607	Church of St Peter More images
Easton Methodist Church with Former Manse and Boundary Walls	Easton, Portland	Methodist church and manse	1906	17 May 1993	SY6911271845; 50°32′44″N 2°26′14″W	1280713	Easton Methodist Church with Former Manse and Boundary Walls More images
Gateway and Curtain Wall to South East of Captain's House	Castletown, Portland	Gateway	Mid 16th century	17 May 1993	SY6844774341; 50°34′05″N 2°26′49″W	1205280	Upload Photo
Grove County Primary School with Rear Boundary Wall	The Grove, Portland	School	Opened 1872	21 September 1978	SY6995472555; 50°33′07″N 2°25′32″W	1205631	Grove County Primary School with Rear Boundary Wall More images
Queen Anne House with Boundary Wall and Gate Piers	Fortuneswell, Portland	House	Early 18th century	17 May 1993	SY6892073298; 50°33′31″N 2°26′24″W	1203085	Upload Photo
Ruins of Church of St Andrew	Easton, Portland	Anglican church	14th century	16 January 1951	SY6967971106; 50°32′20″N 2°25′45″W	1205384	Ruins of Church of St Andrew More images
The Citadel, North Entrance	Portland	Arch and tunnel	1880	17 May 1993	SY6906273874; 50°33′50″N 2°26′17″W	1206120	The Citadel, North Entrance
The Citadel, South Entrance	Portland	Gatehouse	1881	17 May 1993	SY6933373418; 50°33′35″N 2°26′03″W	1203116	The Citadel, South Entrance
The Citadel, South West and South East Casemates	Portland	Casemates	c. 1860	17 May 1993	SY6923873547; 50°33′39″N 2°26′08″W	1203117	Upload Photo
Belfield House	Weymouth	Country house	c. 1775	12 December 1953	SY6675677885; 50°35′59″N 2°28′16″W	1313440	Belfield House More images
Black Dog Public House	Weymouth	Inn	17th century	18 June 1970	SY6799479138; 50°36′40″N 2°27′13″W	1132631	Black Dog Public House More images
Church of St Andrew	Preston, Weymouth	Anglican church	16th century, restored 1855	12 December 1953	SY7058182968; 50°38′44″N 2°25′03″W	1135140	Church of St Andrew More images
Church of St Ann	Radipole, Weymouth	Anglican church	14th century, 19th-century restoration	12 December 1953	SY6672481370; 50°37′52″N 2°28′19″W	1096727	Church of St Ann More images
Church of St John the Evangelist	Weymouth	Anglican church	1854	12 December 1953	SY6823080058; 50°37′10″N 2°27′02″W	1272142	Church of St John the Evangelist More images
Church of St Laurence	Upwey, Weymouth	Anglican church	Late 15th century, 19th-century restoration	12 December 1953	SY6605685241; 50°39′57″N 2°28′54″W	1272096	Church of St Laurence More images
Church of the Holy Trinity	Weymouth	Anglican church	1888	12 December 1953	SY6785778650; 50°36′24″N 2°27′20″W	1148099	Church of the Holy Trinity More images
Devonshire Buildings (terrace)	Weymouth	House	c. 1805 – 1819 with 20th-century additions	12 December 1953	SY6824578836; 50°36′30″N 2°27′00″W	1145964	Devonshire Buildings (terrace) More images
Gloucester Lodge with the Cork and Bottle Public House	Weymouth	Apartments and public house	c. 1780, extended c. 1850	12 December 1953	SY6800179373; 50°36′47″N 2°27′13″W	1038271	Gloucester Lodge with the Cork and Bottle Public House More images
Guildhall with Attached Rear Boundary Wall	Weymouth	Guildhall	1836–37, with late 20th-century modifications	12 December 1953	SY6794378756; 50°36′27″N 2°27′16″W	1132630	Guildhall with Attached Rear Boundary Wall More images
Maiden Street Methodist Church	Weymouth	Methodist church	1866–1870	2 September 1996	SY6799378757; 50°36′28″N 2°27′13″W	1142294	Maiden Street Methodist Church More images
Malthouse Number 4	Weymouth	Malt house	1889	25 September 1990	SY6812278485; 50°36′19″N 2°27′07″W	1148063	Malthouse Number 4 More images
Netherton Nursing Home	Weymouth	House	Mid 18th century	12 December 1953	SY6750978600; 50°36′22″N 2°27′38″W	1132601	Netherton Nursing Home More images
Nothe Fort and Outer Gateway	Nothe Gardens, Weymouth	Coastal fort	c. 1860 – 1872	14 June 1974	SY6870678735; 50°36′27″N 2°26′37″W	1313430	Nothe Fort and Outer Gateway More images
Numbers 1-12 with Railings, Waterloo Place	Weymouth	Terrace	c. 1835	12 December 1953	SY6816679912; 50°37′05″N 2°27′05″W	1147976	Upload Photo
Pulteney Buildings (terrace)	Weymouth	House	c. 1805	12 December 1953	SY6819478823; 50°36′30″N 2°27′03″W	1145965	Pulteney Buildings (terrace) More images
Radipole Old Manor	Radipole, Weymouth	Manor house	Late 16th century	12 December 1953	SY6674081381; 50°37′52″N 2°28′18″W	1271639	Upload Photo
Sandsfoot Castle Remains	Weymouth	Device Fort	c. 1541	12 December 1953	SY6748277372; 50°35′43″N 2°27′39″W	1096763	Sandsfoot Castle Remains More images
Statue House, Johnstone Row (terrace)	Weymouth	House	c. 1815	12 December 1953	SY6800579202; 50°36′42″N 2°27′13″W	1038260	Statue House, Johnstone Row (terrace) More images
The White Hart Public House	Weymouth	Hotel	Early 17th century	12 December 1953	SY6786979006; 50°36′36″N 2°27′20″W	1147950	The White Hart Public House More images
Upwey Manor	Upwey, Weymouth	Manor house	1639	12 December 1953	SY6667884261; 50°39′25″N 2°28′22″W	1148066	Upwey Manor
Upwey Mill	Upwey, Weymouth	Corn mill	1802	12 December 1953	SY6625085076; 50°39′52″N 2°28′44″W	1272205	Upwey Mill
Westbrook House	Upwey, Weymouth	Country house	1620, extended c. 1740 – 1750	12 December 1953	SY6659484364; 50°39′29″N 2°28′26″W	1272208	Upload Photo

== See also ==
- Grade I listed buildings in Dorset
