= Southwell, Dorset =

Village in Dorset, England

Coordinates: 50.529460°N 2.441058°W

Southwell
- Location within Dorset
- Civil parish: Portland
- Unitary authority: Dorset
- Ceremonial county: Dorset
- Region: South West
- Country: England
- Sovereign state: United Kingdom
- Post town: Portland
- Postcode district: DT5
- Dialling code: 01305
- Police: Dorset
- Fire: Dorset and Wiltshire
- Ambulance: South Western
- UK Parliament: South Dorset

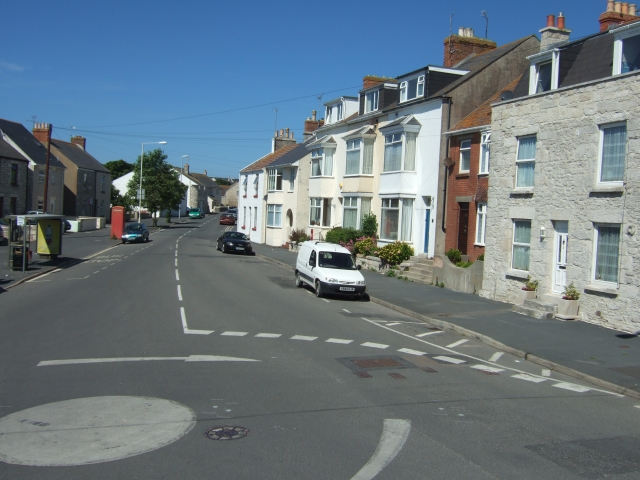
Part of Southwell from the High Street roundabout

Southwell (pronounced south-well) is a small coastal village in Tophill on the Isle of Portland, Dorset. As Portland and Dorset's southernmost village, it lies between Portland Bill and the villages of Easton and Weston. Though close to the Bill, the village is sheltered by hills on three sides. It is the only village on Portland not to be designated a conservation area.

The Great Southwell Landslip, named after the village, remains Britain's second largest recorded historical landslide on the east side of Portland, occurring in 1734, between Durdle Pier and Freshwater Bay, at a distance of one and a half miles.

== History ==
Southwell has medieval origins, and was established around a natural watercourse and various springs. It is likely that the Romans developed the village water sources. The various archaeological finds around the village include Iron Age earth defences and Roman stone sarcophagi. The village grew with agricultural industry, and was surrounded by strip fields, also known as lawnsheds. From the 1840s onwards Portland saw a large increase within its population, due to the construction of Portland Harbour's Breakwaters. The island's wells and ponds could not cope, and so in 1890 work began on the digging of a deep shaft at Southwell for a new water supply. The work continued until May 1895, however the shaft was dug too deep, the water turned brackish, and the scheme has to be abandoned. The shaft, 200 feet deep, still remains underground today.

Southwell retained its small community throughout the 19th century. In 1879, the Avalanche Memorial Church, also known as the Church of St Andrew, was built within the village. At the turn of the 20th-century, some of the village's surrounding fields would be destroyed by inland quarrying. Despite this there are remaining examples between the village, and Portland Bill. With the outbreak of World War II, a number of heavy anti-aircraft batteries were constructed to protect Portland's naval base, and Portland's HAA "C Battery" was built to the western outskirts of the village, at Barrow Hill. Following the war, the battery was retained as an Off-Site Nucleus Force Battery, though it was demolished a few years later.

At the beginning of the Cold War, the Admiralty selected Barrow Hill to build a new Admiralty Gunnery Establishment. In 1959 it became part of the Admiralty Underwater Weapons Establishment (AUWE). The establishment became infamous for the discovery of a Soviet spy ring that operated from the late 1950s until 1961 when the core of the network was arrested by the British security services. The establishment closed in the 1990s when the navy left Portland, and it became the Southwell Business Park in 1997. Throughout the 20th-century Southwell continued to remain a rural community, until the 1960s when major expansion saw many large housing and bungalow estates established. In the 1980s hundreds of starter homes were also built in the village. During 2002–03, both the Sweethill estate and the fields north of Southwell Business Park were developed.

== Features ==
Like many of the other villages on Portland, Southwell has commercial businesses, namely within the Southwell Business Park. Aside from the park, the Eight Kings pub remains the only commercial business within the village. The village had one Primary School, Southwell County Primary School. In the south of the village remains the sewerage pumping station, which was originally built in the late 1980s.

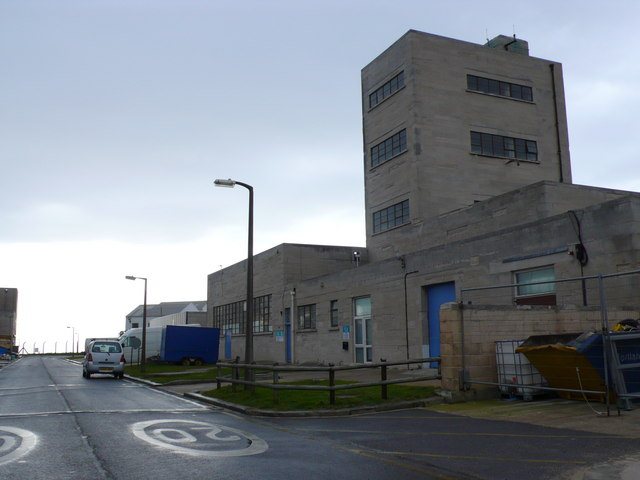
A small part of the Southwell Business Park

The Southwell Business Park is located to the south-west of Southwell village. Once the AUWE site was closed in the 1990s, it then became the successful Southwell Business Park, used for commercial purposes. The park provided employment for almost 500 people and became home to over 100 businesses. In 2010, the park was under new ownership, where Compass Point Estates bought the park from KPMG after going into administrative receivership. In September 2016, part of the site will be home to the Isle of Portland Aldridge Community Academy's £14 million campus, after an appeal overturned the decision of Weymouth and Portland Borough Council's planning committee to refuse permission for the build at Maritime House. The park is also the site of the Ocean Hotel, once known as the Portland Hotel, the Venue Hotel and the Ocean Hotel and Spa.

== Grade listed features ==
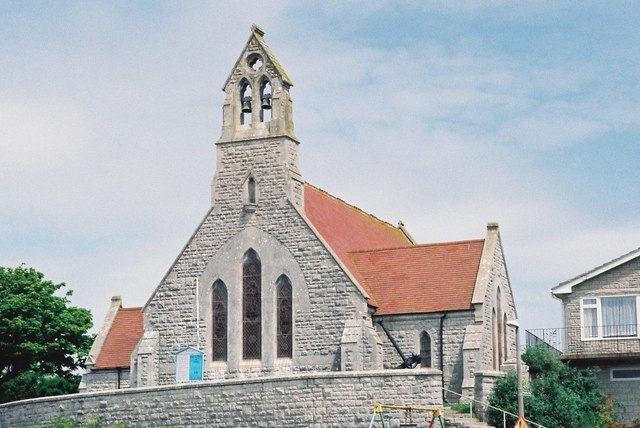
The Avalanche Memorial Church

Southwell has a number of buildings which are Grade listed buildings. 23 Southwell Street, and the garden wall attached to the west of 47 Southwell Street are Grade II listed. The Avalanche Memorial Church has also Grade II Listed, along with its boundary wall, since September 1978. A small Methodist Chapel, named Southwell Methodist Chapel, dating from 1849, is also Grade II listed.

The surrounding fields between Portland Bill and Southwell are made up of an ancient strip field system. These particular fields remain untouched from housing or quarrying. Aside from the fields attached to the Culverwell Mesolithic Site near Portland Bill, two separate open fields have been also been scheduled under the Ancient Monuments and Archaeological Areas Act 1979. One of these is located just south of Southwell village.
