= The George Inn, Portland =

Pub on the Isle of Portland, Dorset, England

Coordinates: 50.5467°N 2.4419°W

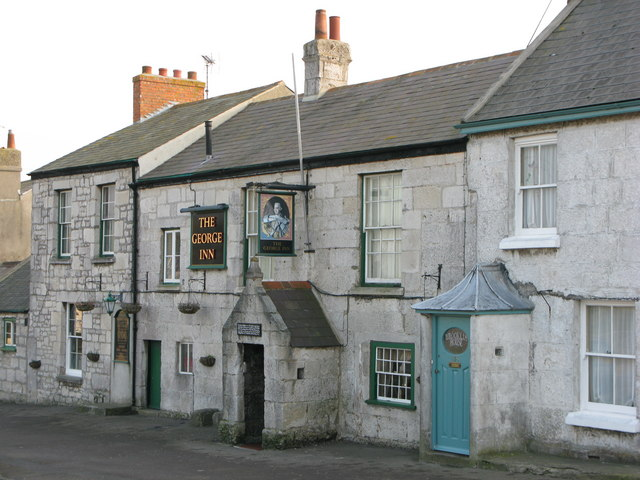
The George Inn, 2008

The George Inn is a Grade II-listed 18th-century public house on the Isle of Portland, Dorset, England. It is situated within the village of Easton, at the west end of the hamlet of Reforne. The pub is located close to St George's Church and St George's Centre.

== History ==
The building was originally two separate houses, various sources report these to have been built between 1610 and 1700 although a date concurrent with the date stone is also possible. In the 18th century the house was the residence of William Butts, the parish clerk of the nearby St George's Church. Above the inn's main door is a stone dated 1765 with the letters W G B, and it is believed that this date was inscribed on the building by Butts. In the late 18th or early 19th century the building underwent alterations to enlarge and heighten the first floor, the roof was raised and the first floor stone mullioned windows changed to larger sash windows.

The George Inn is one of the oldest pubs on Portland and is supposed to be one of the oldest continuously inhabited buildings on the island. The inn was the meeting-place of the Court Leet of the Royal Manor of Portland, and the building still holds an original reeve staff used to record rent payments. The building has also been reputed to have been a smugglers' haunt.

== Description ==
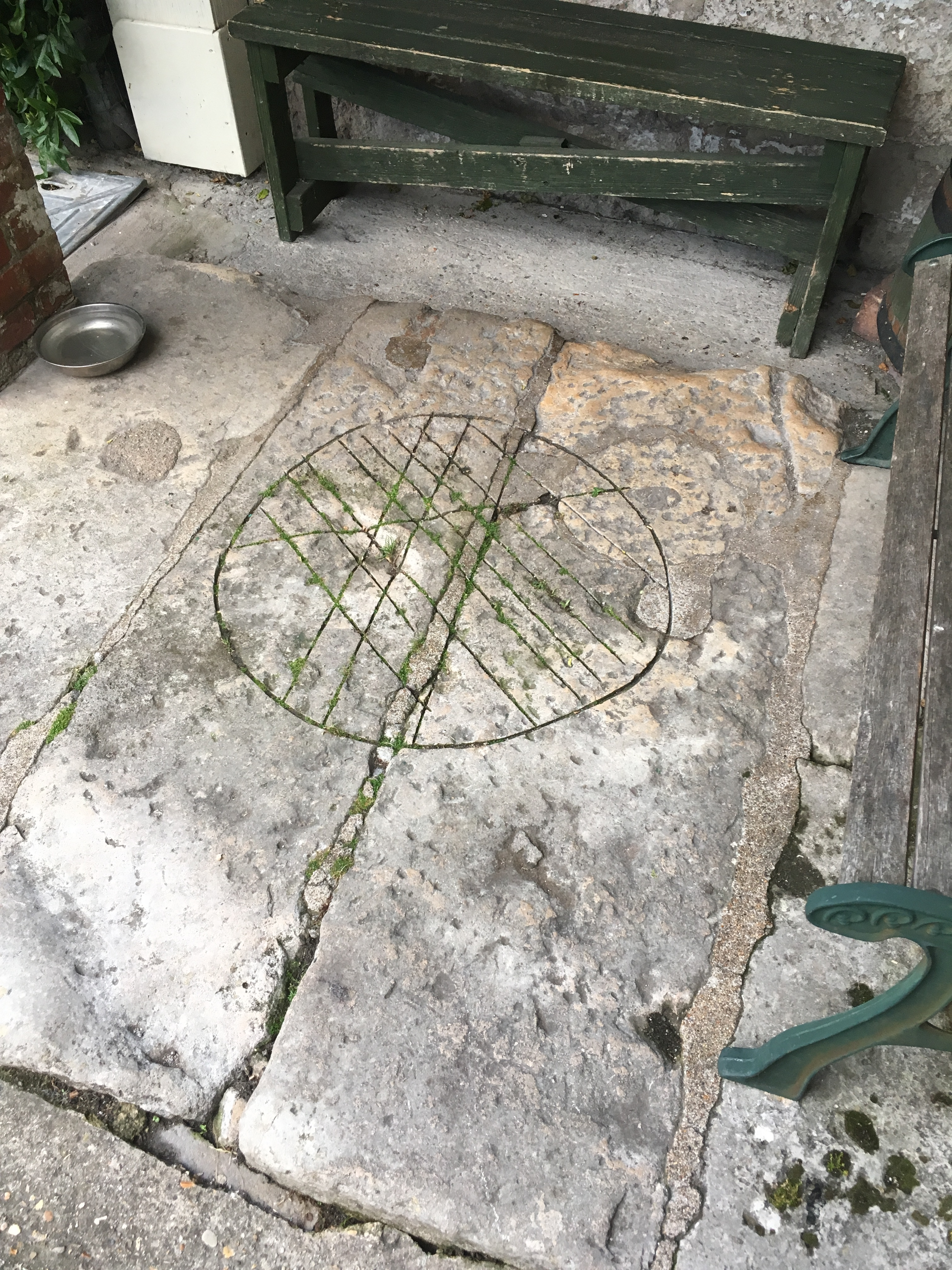
Mysterious paving slab at the back door

Three linked buildings comprise the George Inn with the leftmost a single-storey structure with rubble walls. The left part of this building has a pair of plank garage doors with a corrugated asbestos roof and it then steps up slightly and has slate roof. It has a plank door on the left and a two-light casement on the right side. A two-storey structure is in the middle that contains the former Court Leet meeting room in coursed rubble and a slate roof. There is a brick chimney stack to the left gable; there are two large 12-paned windows above a single 12-pane window. To the right is a pair of 20th century glazed doors under a transom light. The main part of the Inn is built in large dressed squared stone blocks with a slate roof. The two-storey building has a projecting porch with a prominent gable and side lights. The 18th century door has early strap hinges. Above this is the cambered lintel inscribed with the date 1765 and "B W*G". The rear of the building has a deep gabled wing.

In the Summer of 2011, the pub won the regional award of being the West Country Community Pub of the Year 2011 in the Publicans Morning Advertiser Awards. Following this, the owners were in contention for the National Community Pub Award. The George Inn's offers four different areas in use for the public and a beer garden. The four areas are The Quarr Barr, The Reeve Bar, The Shilling Bar, and The Cricket Room.
