= Zheewegonab =

Band leader among the northern Ojibwe (1780–1805)

Zheewegonab (sometimes Shewaquonap, or Sheawaquanep) (fl. 1780 – 1805) was a band leader among the northern Ojibwe.

Zheewegonab was the son of Nonosecash, a band leader among the northern Ojibwe. Nonosecash's band was recorded as numbering about 30 people in 1766. Nonosecash was murdered in 1772 or 1773, and his brother about a year later. It was probably about this time that Zheewegonab became a band leader.

No records exist of Zheewegonab until 1780, when John Kipling of the Gloucester House in Washi Lake recorded trading with Zheewegonab. Zheewegonab returned to trade again in 1781, remarking that he was happy with the treatment there. A smallpox epidemic in 1781 and 1782 affected Zheewegonab's band, killing a substantial fraction of its members. The band was unable to trade in furs during this time, but returned to Gloucester House in 1783. However, finding the place empty, he threw away the furs and began trading furs to traders in Montreal.

Zheewegonab was encountered in 1784 by James Sutherland of the Hudson's Bay Company. Sutherland found Zheewegonab, as well as Cannematchie and their respective bands by Pashkokogan Lake. Upon hearing the tale of Zheewegonab's switch to dealing with Montreal fur traders, Sutherland implored Zheewegonab to return to dealing with the Gloucester House, smoked calumet with him, exchanged a gift of guns with him, and after a dance and a feast, Zheewegonab agreed to once again deal with the Gloucester House.

Zheewegonab's band hunted around the north shore of Lake St. Joseph during the 1780s and 1790s. When Osnaburgh House was built in 1786 by the Hudson's Bay Company, Zheewegonab traded with it often, but also traded with the North West Company when he could get a better deal with them. When his request to the Hudson's Bay Company that they build a trading post 90 miles west of the Osnaburgh House was ignored, Zheewegonab began trading with the North West Company more often. While Osnaburgh House's trade John McKay remarked that he was unsure any skin brought in by Zheewegonab ever made its money back, he was a prolific trader, in part due to his influence as "the chief Captain at Osnaburgh" in the 1790s and early 19th century. Zheewegonab is not mentioned in any records after 1805, and may have died or merely lost his position about this time.
