= St John's Church, Portland =

Church in Dorset, England

Coordinates: 50.5606°N 2.4437°W

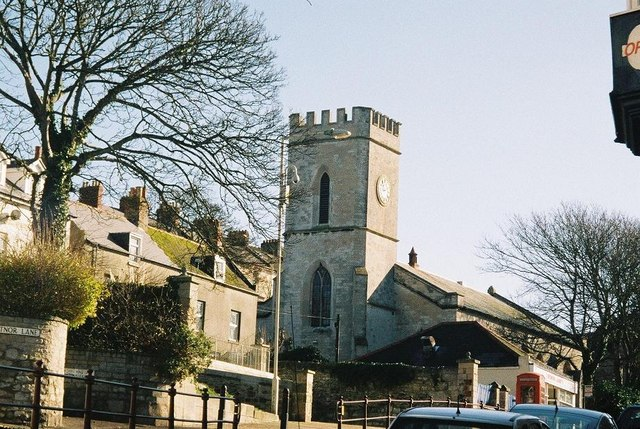
St John's Church situated prominently in Fortuneswell.

St. John's Church (also known as St John the Baptist Church) is an Anglican Church of England church in Fortuneswell, on the Isle of Portland, Dorset. It was built between 1838–40 and has been a Listed Grade II building since January 1951. The churchyard walls, gate piers, railings, and steps of St. John's Church, dating from 1839–40, became Grade II Listed in September 1978. At this same time, two headstone monuments, about 5 metres north east from the west tower of the church became Grade II Listed.

Designed by Edward Mondey or Charles Wallis, the church cost £2,315. Built of Portland stone, the church has a Gothic design in Commissioners' Early English style. It has also been described as Norman in its architecture.

The church remains active, as part of the Portland Parish - a host of three churches; St John's Church (St John the Baptist), All Saints Church and the Avalanche Memorial Church (St Andrew's Church).

== History ==
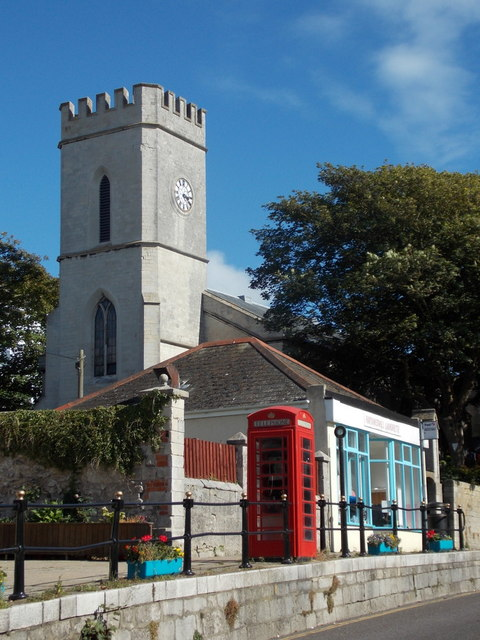
St John's Church

St George's Church, built between 1754–66, was the island's only parish church into the 19th century. However, by the 1830s, it had become too small and inconvenient for the increasing population within Underhill. It was decided that a new church should be built for Underhill as a sister church to St George's. The church's construction commenced in 1838, and was completed by 1840, with the work undertaken by John Hancock of Weymouth. In 1865 Underhill became a parish in its own right, with St. John's becoming the parish church.

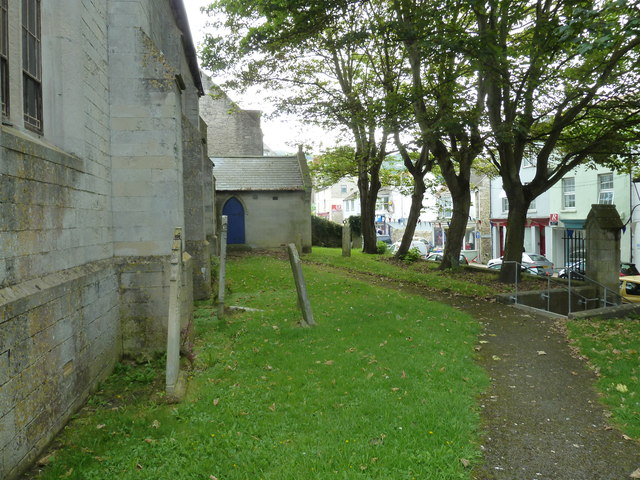
One section of the churchyard of St John's Church.

During 1876 the church underwent renovation and was also enlarged. This included the addition of a chancel and organ chamber by George Crickmay. During 1901 a new Parish room for the church was built and opened at the north end of Ventnor Road. When the Second World War drew to a close, on VJ Day, the 14th Port Regiment of the US Army presented its Stars and Stripes colours to St John's Church, as a memento of its close association with the people of Portland, both service and civilian.

In 1968 a Father Willis Organ was brought from St Paul's School, Kensington, London for £2,000, and installed after the balcony was reinforced. The organ fell into disrepair due to lack of use, with repairs quoted at an unachievable £100,000. In 2013 it was sold to the Parish Church of Our Lady of Loretu, Għajnsielem Gozo.
