= Great Southwell Landslip =

1734 natural disaster in Dorset, England

Coordinates: 50.5301°N 2.4373°W

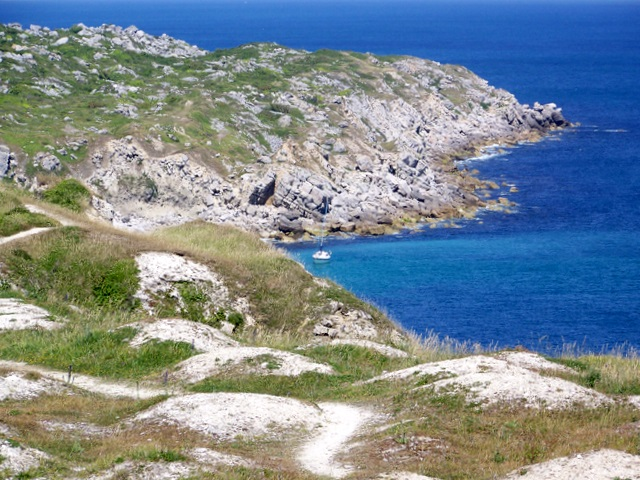
A major area of toppled stone from the landslide.

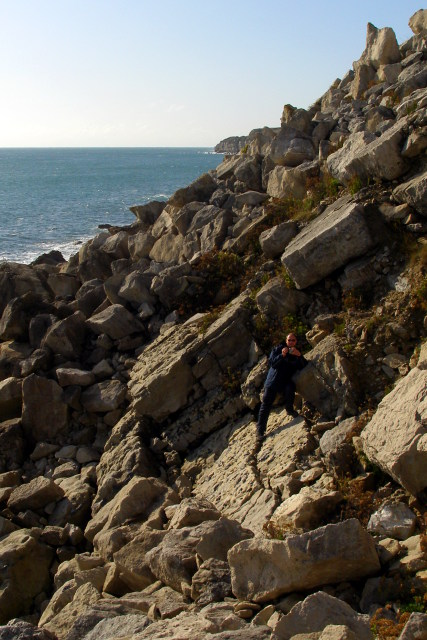
Large blocks of stone at unusual angles following the event.

The Great Southwell Landslip occurred in 1734 on the Isle of Portland, Dorset, England near the southerly village of Southwell and extended for a length of 1.5 miles (2.4 km) between Durdle Pier and Freshwater Bay. It remains Britain's second largest recorded historical landslide.

== Geological factors ==
Cracks and gullies within the cliffs had allowed rain water to percolate through the layers of Purbeck Beds, Portland Limestone and Portland Sand to the underlying impermeable Kimmeridge Clay, and the accumulation of water had weakened the structure between the strata. Because the island tilts to the south and the east, this allowed the overlying strata to slip.

== Effects ==
At St Andrew's Church a large section of the graveyard slipped down the cliff. A survey of the old church found that repairs would cost at least half as much as a new building. Consequently the church was closed and partly demolished in July 1756. Much of the stone was taken for use in local domestic dwellings. St George's Church was soon built at Reforne between 1754 and 1766, near Easton village, to replace the church.

== Subsequent history ==
Since the landslip the area south of Church Ope Cove has been given the local name of Southwell Landslips. The cliff face has been subject to extensive quarrying, and subsequent smaller landslips have tilted huge masses of rocks at odd angles.

Along this part of the coastline much of Portland's raw sewage once poured into the sea from an exposed pipe. An expensive scheme was completed to pump all Portland's sewage to Weymouth.

The area is to be a new nature reserve, created as part of a housing development north of Weston Road and to the south-east of Perryfields, and the existing Perryfields Butterfly Reserve and SNCI. In the north-eastern corner of Coombefield is the working Pennsylvania Quarry, which has existing wildlife value.
