= Freshwater Bay, Portland =

Bay on the Isle of Portland, Dorset, England

Coordinates: 50.5301°N 2.4373°W

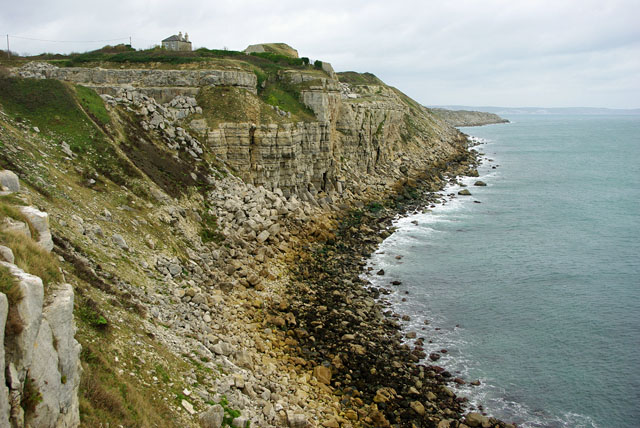
Freshwater Bay, Cheyne House and the pumping station.

Freshwater Bay is a bay on the east side of the Isle of Portland, Dorset, England, south from Church Ope Cove and between the villages of Wakeham and Southwell. It forms part of the Jurassic Coast.

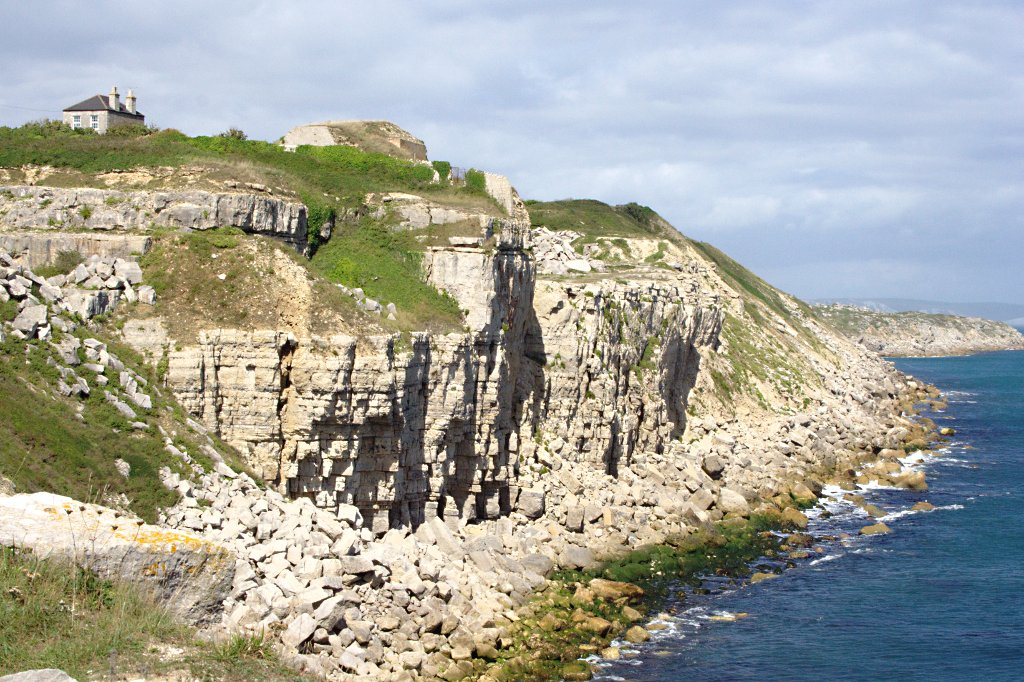
Freshwater Bay.

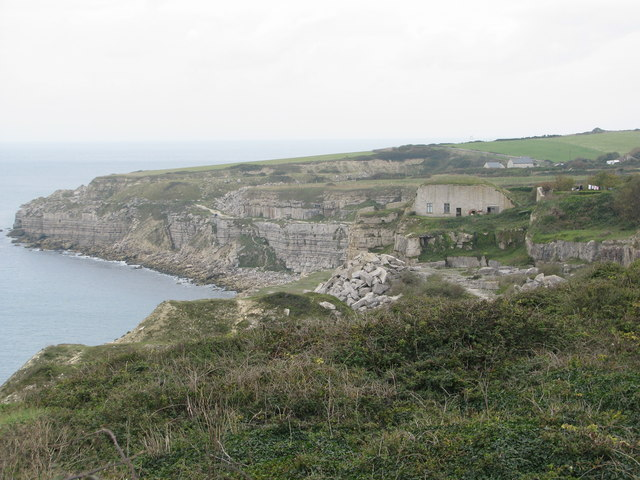
Freshwater Bay, and the pumping station.

Freshwater Bay takes its name from a freshwater spring which emerged at the bottom of the cliff. An Admiralty pumping station was built on the clifftop in the 19th century for supplying fresh water to the naval base and to the harbour's breakwaters during their construction. Cheyne House was built for the attendant of the station. The man-made tunnel for the pumped water was known as Cheyne Tunnel, and in 2011 this was blocked by a rockfall.

For many decades and through to the second half of the 20th century the bay was in regular use by commercial fishermen.

The Great Southwell Landslip, Britain's second largest recorded historical landslide, occurred in 1734, between Durdle Pier and Freshwater Bay, along a length of 1.5 miles (2.4 km).

Freshwater Bay is reputed to be one of the best places on Portland for fossil locating. The area is known to be popular for fishing, and the cliffs of the bay are also popular with rock climbers.

== In popular culture ==
Above Freshwater Bay is Cheyne House and its grounds which were used, along with other locations across Portland and Weymouth, in the 1963 film The Damned.
