= Weymouth Old Town Hall =

Municipal building in Weymouth, Dorset, England

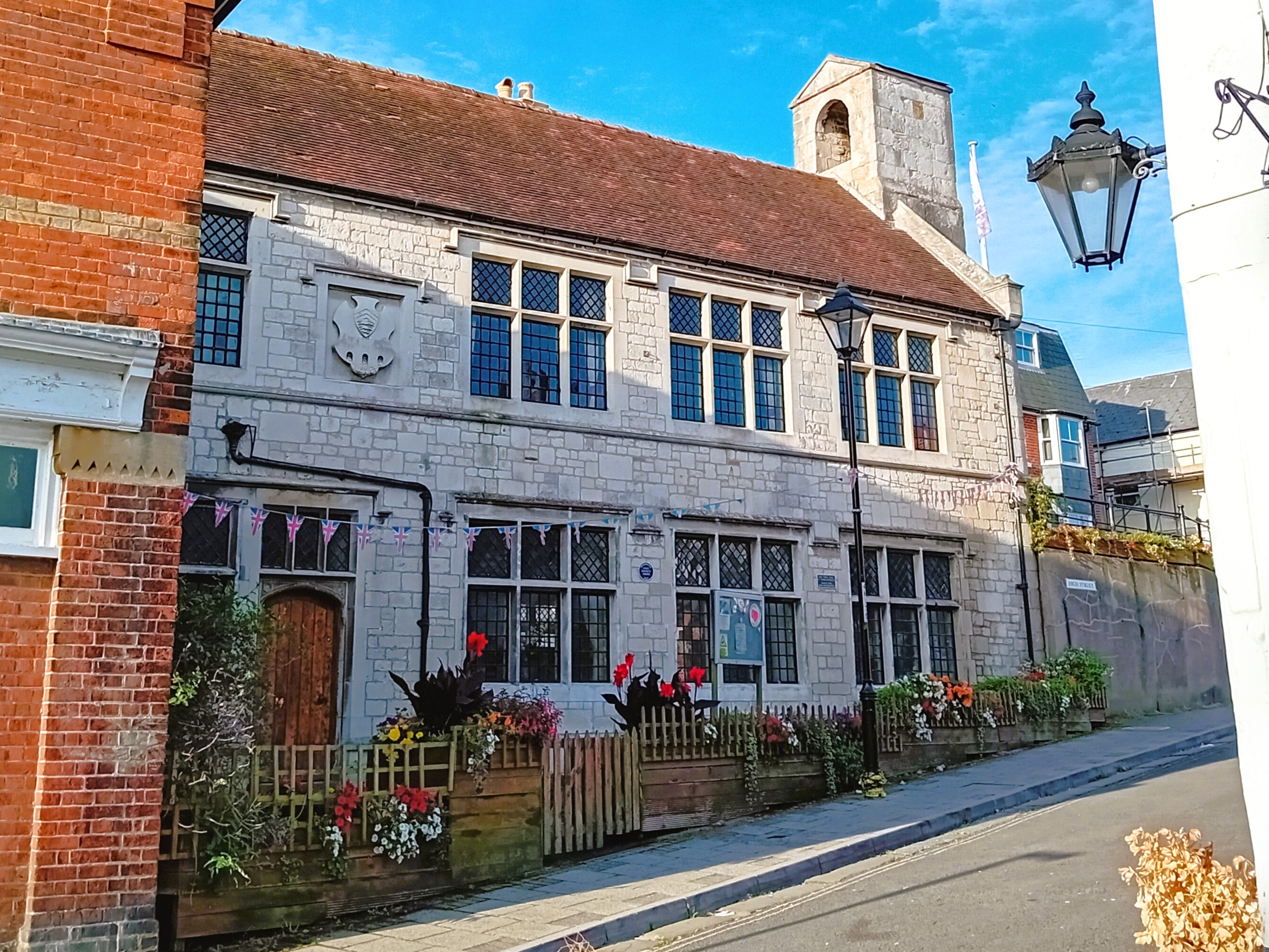
- Weymouth Old Town Hall in 2024.

- Location within Dorset
- 50°36′23″N 2°27′31″W
- Location: Weymouth, Dorset

History
- Built: 1774

Listed Building – Grade II
- Designated: 12 December 1953
- Reference no.: 1141923

Weymouth Old Town Hall is a former town hall at Weymouth, Dorset, England. The building, which was built with Portland stone in the 1770s, has been Grade II listed since 1953. The bell turret is believed to date from the 17th century. Since 2009, the hall has been operated for community use by the Guardians of the Old Town Hall.

== History ==
The Old Town Hall has Tudor origins, with the same site being the location of an earlier town hall since the 16th century. Traditionally Weymouth and Melcombe Regis were rivals for trade and industry, until the two towns were united in an Act of Parliament in 1571. However, both continued to use their separate town halls, with Weymouth's being rebuilt around 1774. By the 1890s, the town hall was in need of repair, and a major restoration and alteration project was carried out in 1896 for a cost of £877. The clock above the main door of the building was presented by Sir Henry Edwards upon completion of the work; the clockmaker was Thwaites & Reed. By this time, the Weymouth Guildhall, which had opened in 1838 on the site of the former Melcombe Regis Town Hall, was now the council's main place for meetings.

The hall, still under the council's ownership, was later used as the headquarters of the local Girl Guides from the mid-20th century onwards. The hall became vacant in 2005 and fell into a state of disrepair. Although the council had initially planned to lease the building, the extensive repair work discouraged potential tenants, including the Citizens Advice Bureau who had considered moving into the building. The council attempted to sell the hall in 2007, but after a deal fell through, the council gave the Chapelhay Community Partnership a 30 year rent-free lease in 2009 to transform the building into an arts and heritage centre. The Guardians of the Old Town Hall formed that year as a community interest company to manage and operate the building.

The hall quickly became a regular host of various events and exhibitions, while planned restoration work received planning approval in 2011. The old town hall bell, which had been removed for repairs in the 1970s, was returned in February 2011. Further restoration was undertaken in 2015, funded by McCarthy & Stone, who then temporarily used the building as a sales office for their nearby Harbour Lights Court development. The work received the Weymouth Civic Society Award for 2015.
