= All Saints Church, Portland =

Church in Dorset, England

Coordinates: 50.5455°N 2.4347°W

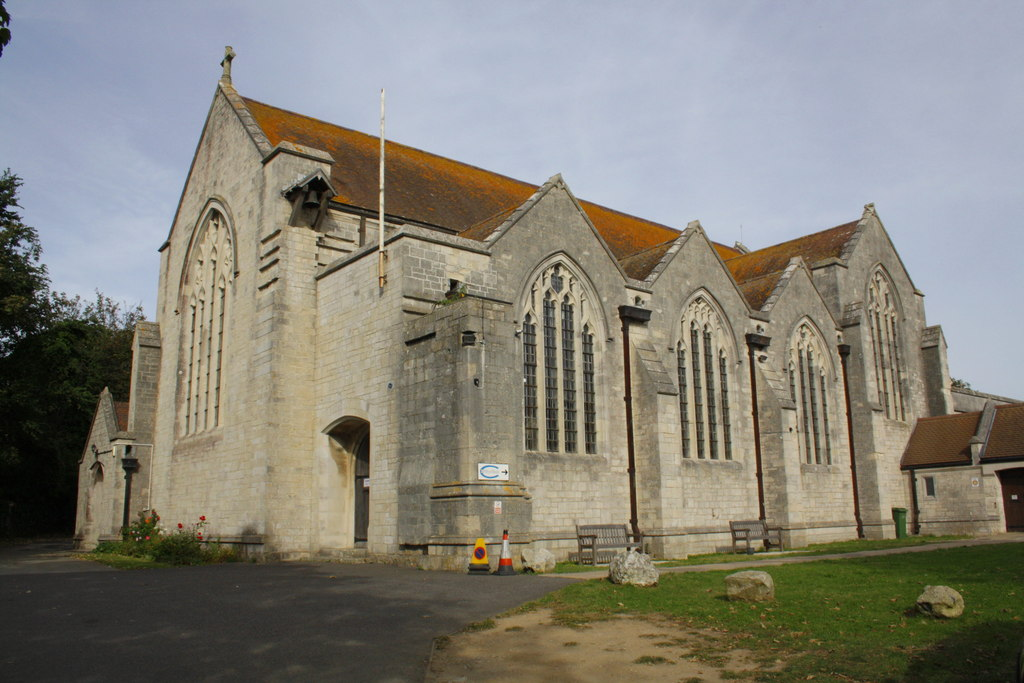
All Saints Church

All Saints Church is a Church of England church in Easton, on the Isle of Portland, Dorset. It was consecrated in 1917 and has been a listed grade II building since September 1978. The church succeeded to the rights, privileges, registers and silver of the St George's Church. It has been described as the finest ecclesiastical building on Portland – though somewhat hidden at its position. The church remains active to date, as part of the Portland Parish – a host of three churches; St. John's Church (St John the Baptist), All Saints Church and the Avalanche Memorial Church (St Andrew's Church).

== History ==
By the 20th-century, the bishop of the time expressed the wish for a new church to be constructed on Portland, to succeed St George's as the parish church. The church was known for being uncomfortable and draughty, while the original freehold selling of the box pews proved to be a burden over the life of the church. This was because the pew owners had become untraceable as they had been split between hundreds of members of Portland families over time. These issues led to plans being put forward for a new parish church, and these were approved in 1913.

By March 1914, enough funding had been raised to commence the building of the church. The chosen site for the church was within the Easton area known as Straits. The building of the church commenced in 1914, and was completed and consecrated in 1917. It had been designed by architect George Crickmay, and built by Crickmay and Sons, with total costs amounting to £13,000. The original plans had intended for a tower to be added to the church, however this was never built.
