= Durdle Pier =

Stone pier in Dorset, England

Coordinates: 50.5441°N 2.4179°W

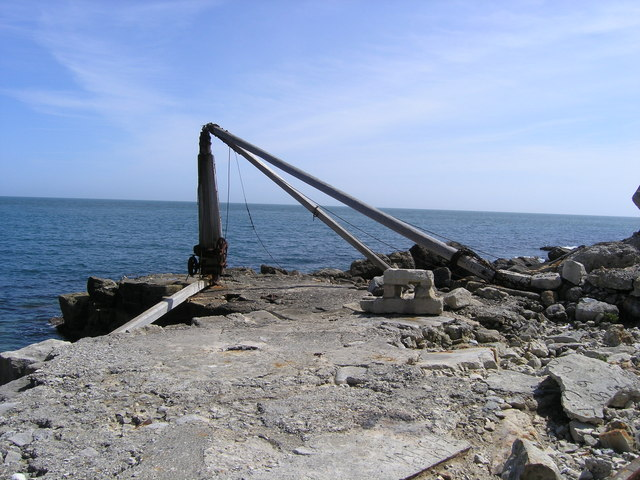
Durdle Pier Crane

Durdle Pier is a disused 17th-century stone shipping quay, located on the Isle of Portland, Dorset, England; part of the Jurassic Coast. It is found close by Yeolands Quarry, on the east side of the island within the area of East Weares and Penn's Weare.

== History ==
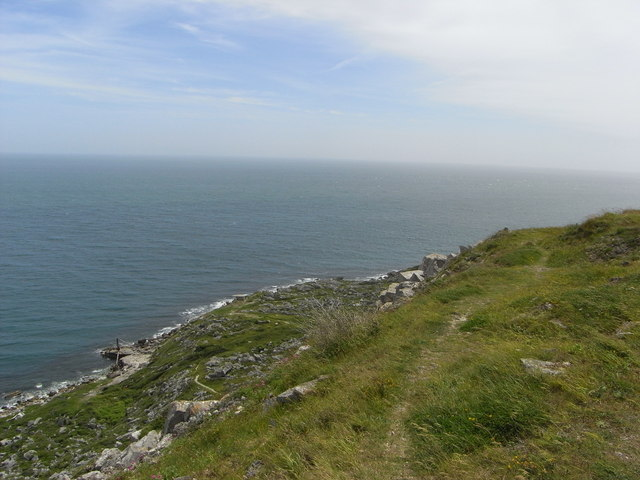
Cliff path above Durdle Pier (seen bottom left).

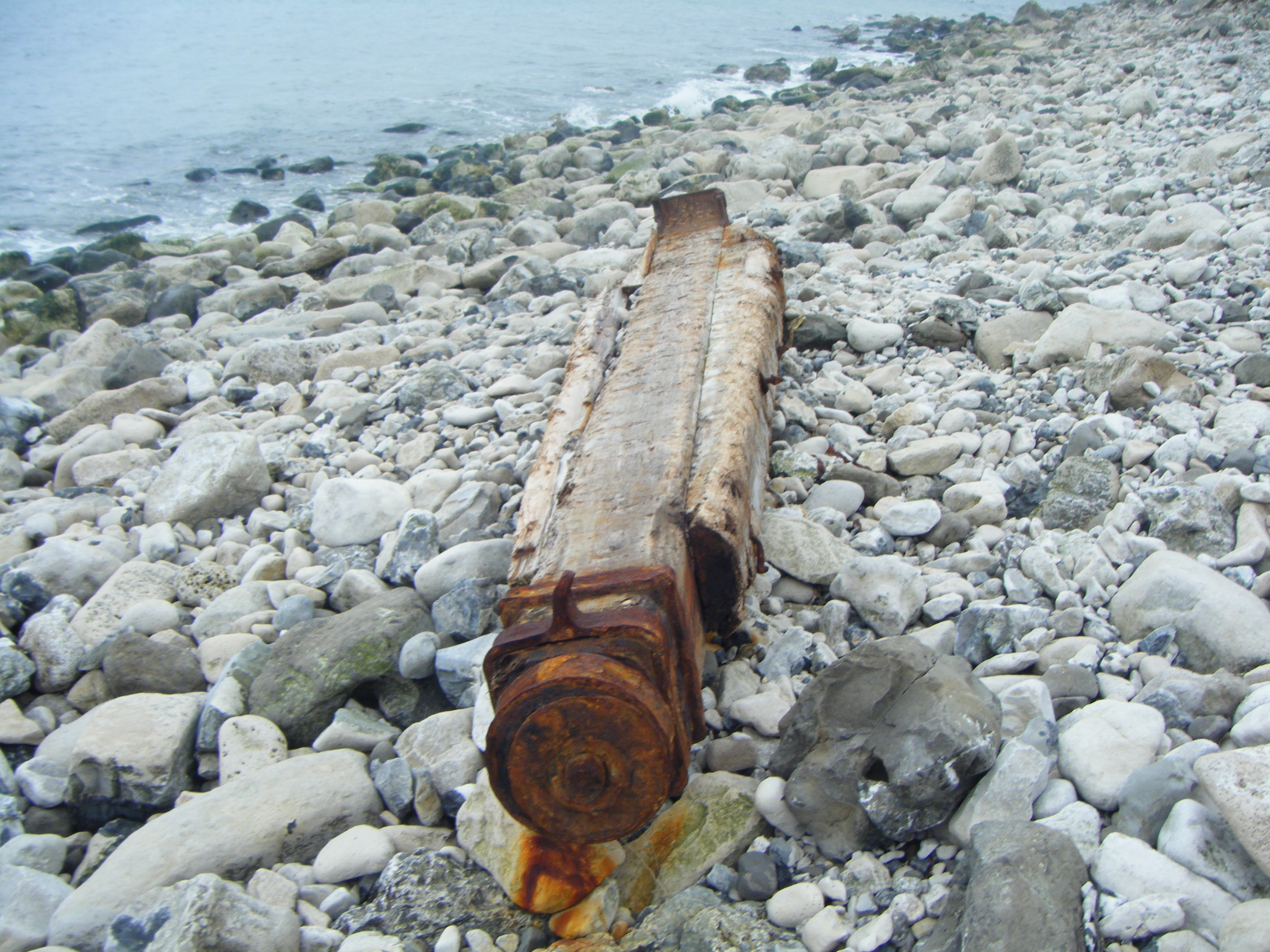
One of three remaining parts of the destroyed crane lying along the eastern coastline.

Durdle Pier dates back to the 17th century and became one of the main stone shipping places on the east side. East and Penn's Weares were the location of Sir Christopher Wren's first workings of stone to rebuild London after the Great Fire of 1666. During the mid-19th century, the original crane was replaced with one made by Galpin of Dorchester.

Once quarrying in the area ended, fishermen became the pier's main users for lifting boats from the water. The crane became broken and beyond repair in the early 21st century. During 2014 the pier's crane was destroyed by the sea. Close to the pier are two World War II pillboxes.

The Great Southwell Landslip, Britain's second-largest recorded historical landslide, occurred in 1734, between Durdle Pier and Freshwater Bay. The Dorset names Durlston Bay and Head (in Swanage) and Durdle Pier, again without early spellings, can be associated etymologically with Durdle Door.
