= Gloucester Street Congregational Church =

Demolished church in Dorset, England

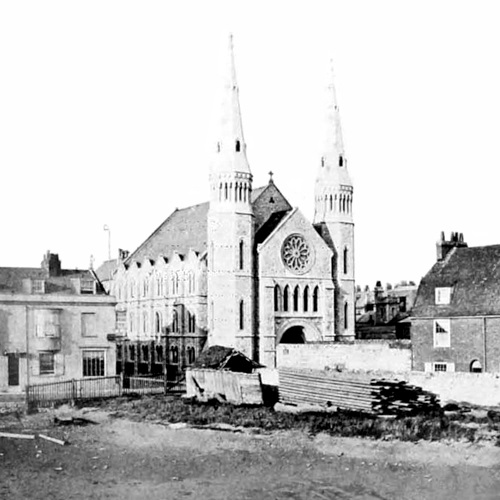
- Gloucester Street Congregational Church in circa 1870.

Religion
- Affiliation: Congregational church
- Ecclesiastical or organizational status: Demolished

Location
- Location: Weymouth, Dorset, England
- Interactive map of Gloucester Street Congregational Church
- Coordinates: 50.6131°N 2.45494°W

Architecture
- Architect: Robert Bennett
- Type: Church
- Completed: 1864

Gloucester Street Congregational Church was a Congregational church in Weymouth, Dorset, England. It was built between 1862 and 1864 to replace a chapel of 1804 at St. Nicholas Street. It closed as a place of worship in 1971 and was demolished in 1980. The site is now occupied by the retirement housing complex, George Thorne House.

== History ==
Gloucester Street Congregational Chapel (later Church) was built to replace an earlier chapel of 1804 in St. Nicholas Street. This chapel had its origins dating back to 1662, when a nonconformist following was established by the rector of Melcombe Regis, Rev. George Thorne, following his refusal to conform with the Act of Uniformity. Some of his congregation decided to follow their rector and a small group began to meet at various dwellings for Divine worship. Owing to the laws and attitudes against nonconformity at the time, Rev. Thorne faced harassment and left the country in 1663, although he did return to Weymouth after the Declaration of Indulgence in 1672. Meanwhile, the small congregation continued to meet secretly for services in different places until 1672, when three cottages in St. Nicholas Street, which were in the possession of George Churchey, began to be used as a meeting place. When Churchey died in 1703, the cottages were purchased by the minister, Rev. John Fenner, for £40; by this time nonconformists had freedom of worship with the passing of the Toleration Act in 1688. Rev. Fenner conveyed the cottages to a group of trustees in 1705 and they were then converted into a chapel/meeting house. This place of worship remained in use until the beginning of the 19th century, by which time a larger and more comfortable building was required and a new chapel was built on the same site in 1803–04.

By the 1860s, the chapel of 1804 was considered poorly sited, inadequate and too small to serve the congregation. Not only was the town's population growing but it was seeing an increasing number of visitors, particularly with the arrival of the railway to Weymouth in 1857. Meanwhile, development of the chapel's surrounding area during the first half of the 19th century meant that it no longer occupied a prominent site and was instead found on a narrow back street with difficult access. In particular, the new Weymouth Town Bridge of 1824 had been repositioned further down the harbour, away from St. Nicholas Street. A committee was formed during the ministry of Rev. Robert Ashton for the construction of a replacement chapel and a new manse. Although it was not considered an ideal site and the committee tried to find a better alternative, a plot of land in Gloucester Street was purchased for £700. The plans for the chapel were drawn up by the Weymouth architect Robert Bennett. By September 1862, the committee had given builder Thomas Dodson of Weymouth the contract for the construction of the chapel, but he was soon replaced by Stephen Brown, one of Weymouth's leading builders of the time, before any work had begun.

Construction of the chapel commenced in November 1862 and the opening services were held on 22 June 1864. Rev. David Thomas of Bristol preached during the morning service and this was followed by a lunch in the chapel's schoolroom. Rev. Henry Allon of Islington then preached during the evening service, with two teas held in the schoolroom afterwards. At the time of its opening, the cost of the chapel amounted to £3,690, of which £3,100 had been successfully raised. £830 of this amount was received as donations by numerous gentlemen who were not part of the congregation. A further £805 was raised by the congregation, with almost £700 of that figure being raised by women of the congregation through bazaars and collections. The sale of the 1805 chapel provided a further £800 towards the costs and £200 was also received from the English Congregational Chapel Building Society. The collections on the chapel's opening day resulted in a further £74 being raised. The construction of the new manse adjoining the chapel followed shortly after for a cost of £489. In 1870, the remaining debt of the new chapel and manse was cleared, both having cost a total of £4,465. By the end of the 19th century, the manse was being used for Sunday school purposes and Literary society meetings.

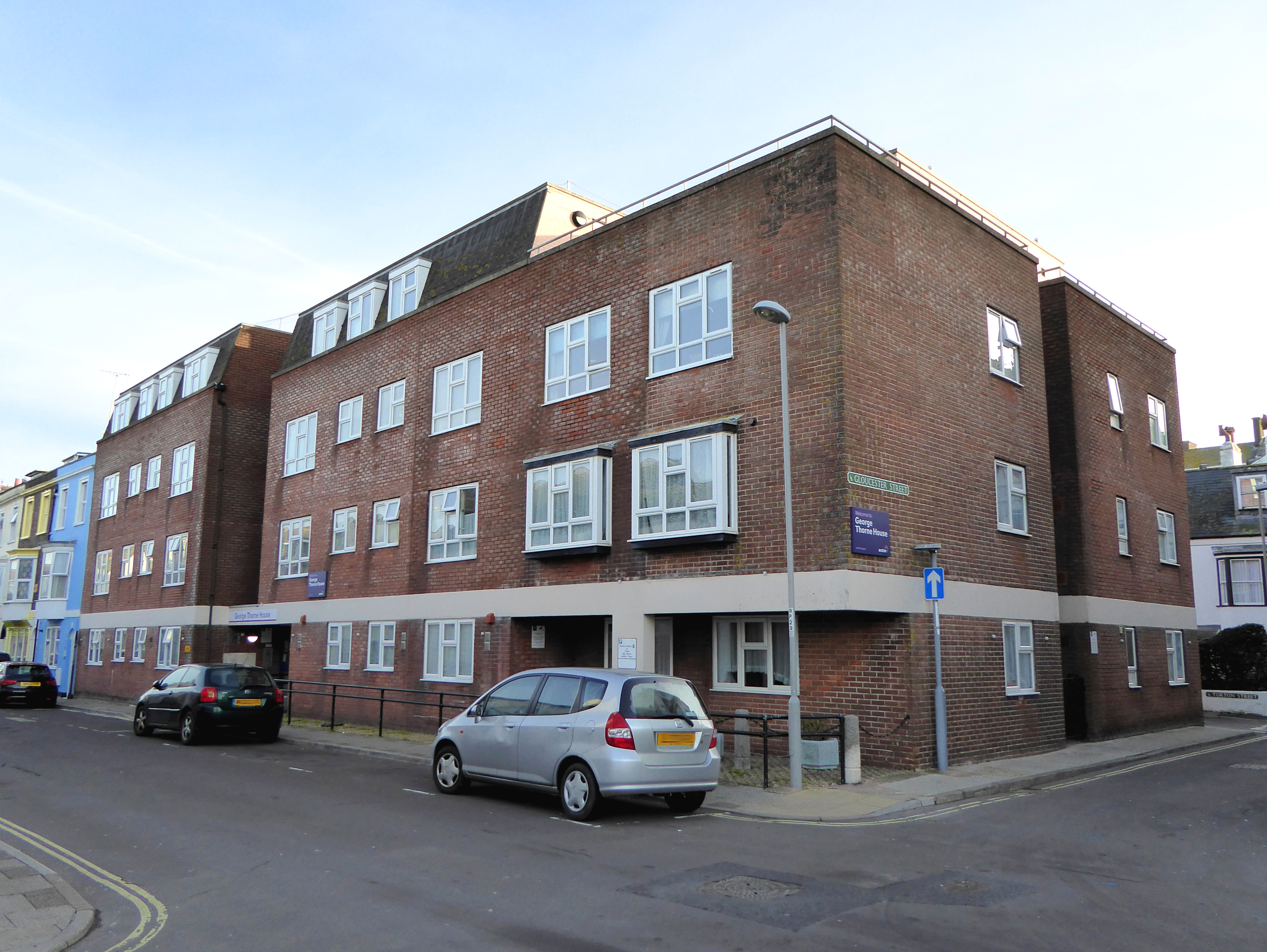
The site of the Congregational Church is now occupied by George Thorne House.

By 1962, the church was showing signs of cracking and subsidence due to its inadequate foundations on what is reclaimed land. Although flooring and subflooring repair work was subsequently carried out, the building was in need of new foundations which was given an estimated cost of £1 million. Gloucester Street Congregational Church closed as a place of worship in 1971 and its congregation joined Hope Congregational Chapel in Trinity Street. The site was then earmarked for redevelopment; the decision to demolish the church to make way for a block of flats for the elderly was made in 1975. The church was demolished in 1980 to make way for George Thorne House, which was officially opened by Robert Gascoyne-Cecil, 7th Marquess of Salisbury, on 5 November 1982.

== Architecture ==
Gloucester Street Congregational Church was built of local Ridgeway stone, with Bath stone dressings. Its front (south) elevation featured a large Norman style archway over the building's main entrance and above this was an arcade, which lit the inside lobby and staircase, and a circular window, 12 feet in diameter. On each side of the entrance was an octagonal staircase turret surmounted by a spire, rising to 96 feet in height. The church had seated accommodation for around 700 people. In addition to the pews, which were positioned so that none of the congregation had to turn their heads to see the preacher, three sides of the church had galleries, supported by iron columns. These could be accessed by their own doorways on Turton Street and Park Street, as well as doorways in both of the turrets. A schoolroom, measuring 48 feet long by 45 feet wide, was in the basement; it could be accessed, along with the church, from a lobby.

Inside the church, the roof was partially open and partially ceiled, and spanned with arch principals of stained and varnished wood. The aisles had tesselated paving with ornamental borders. The circular pulpit was built of Caen stone and marble, and rested on a plinth of Portland stone. It was accessed by winding steps and its balustrade was made up of arches of marble columns and stone capping. The upper part of the pulpit had an open arcade of intersecting arches, with serpentine marble columns surmounted with carved capitals. Behind the pulpit was a recess for the organ and choir, with the vestry located below. The original organ came from the previous chapel and was built in 1859 by Bevington and Co for £211.
