= Christ Church, Weymouth =

Demolished church in Dorset, England

Christ Church
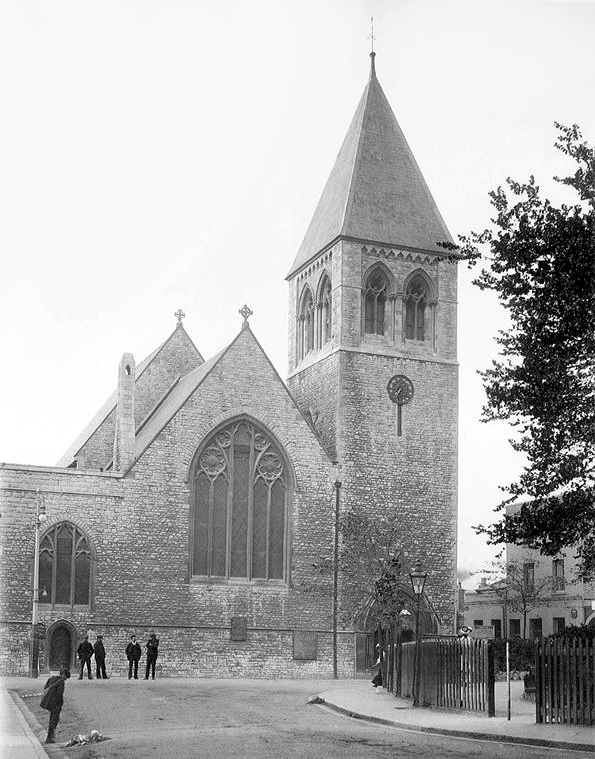
- Christ Church in circa 1900.

Religion
- Affiliation: Church of England
- Ecclesiastical or organisational status: Demolished

Location
- Location: Weymouth, Dorset, England
- Interactive map of Christ Church
- Coordinates: 50.6145°N 2.4542°W

Architecture
- Architect: Ewan Christian
- Type: Church
- Completed: 1874

Christ Church was a Church of England church in Weymouth, Dorset, England. It was built between 1873 and 1874 as a chapel of ease to the parish church of St Mary's. It closed as a place of worship in 1939 and was demolished between 1956 and 1957. The site is now occupied by the residential (with retail units) Garnet Court.

== History ==
=== Construction of Christ Church ===
Christ Church was built in 1873–74 as a chapel of ease to the parish church of St Mary's, at a time when the population of Weymouth had increased and the town's existing churches were unable to provide enough accommodation. There was a lack of free seats for use by the poorer inhabitants of the parish and the demand for accommodation was even higher during the summer months when there was also an influx of visitors. A meeting was held by the rector of Melcombe Regis, Rev. Talbot A. Greaves, on 7 September 1866, which resulted in the formation of a committee tasked with raising the funds for a new church and a sub-committee for finding an eligible site. An offer from the trustees of the Middle School for the free use of their upper room as a temporary place of worship for up to 300 people was also accepted, along with the approval of a second curate for the parish at an annual stipend of £140.

The site chosen for the new church was on the corner of Park and King Streets in the rapidly expanding "Park District", within the north-west region of the parish, and was conveniently situated opposite Weymouth's train station. It belonged to Colonel Vandeleur and an agreement between him and the Melcombe Regis Home Mission Committee was reached in 1867. It was initially decided to lease the site for 1,000 years at an annual rent of £60 rather than pay £1,200 to buy the freehold, but the decision to purchase the site was made later in the year.

Rev. Greaves would lead the movement for the church and donated £600 of his own money towards it. Many other donations were received and fundraising events held over the next few years. A number of designs were considered for the church, including from at least three local architects, but that of London architect Ewan Christian was chosen in January 1871. Due to the nature of the ground, the architect recommended that concrete foundations should be laid across the entire site prior to any construction work. The tender of local builder Thomas Dodson was accepted for this work in July 1871 and it was carried out in 1872.

Dodson was also hired to construct the church and work began in May 1873, by which time approximately £4,600 had been raised by the Committee. Although no ceremony was held to mark the occasion, one was held on 26 September 1873 when the Lord-lieutenant of the county, Anthony Ashley-Cooper, 8th Earl of Shaftesbury, laid the central stone of the chancel window. Christ Church was consecrated by the Bishop of Salisbury, the Right Rev. George Moberly, on 23 July 1874.

The church cost £6,800 to build, including £4,100 for Dodson's contract, £1,200 for the purchase of the land and £500 for laying the foundations. The foundations were six feet deep across the entire site and, as it was to hold a peal of bells, the tower was strengthened by approximately 3,600 piles, eight feet in length and driven into foundations. There was seated accommodation for 800 people and, with the church being "devote[d] specially to the working classes", half of the seats were free. The church finished in 1874 was approximately two-thirds of the original design and it was anticipated that extension work would be carried out when funds allowed in the future, but this never materialised.

In September 1874, a tower clock was gifted by Mr. Scardaw of Bath at the value of £200 and a peal of ten bells for the tower, along with their fittings, was gifted by the local MP, Henry Edwards, at an approximate cost of £350. The bells were cast by John Taylor & Co of Loughborough and chimed by machinery from Messrs Lund and Blockley of London, who were also responsible for their installation. The £200 for the machinery was funded by money raised at a bazaar held in the summer of 1874. The bells first rang out to mark the beginning of 1875 and this was the first occasion in which the town had heard a peal of bells ring out as the other local churches only had a single bell.

A harmonium was originally installed in the church until funds allowed for the purchase of an organ. In 1889, it was decided to purchase one from St Barnabas' Church in Holloway which was for sale through the organ builder Eustace Ingram. It was built by Bishop & Son of London and had been recently restored by Henry Willis & Sons. The total cost of purchasing and fitting the organ in Christ Church was £227 and it was opened on 9 May 1890.

=== Closure of church, World War II use and demolition ===
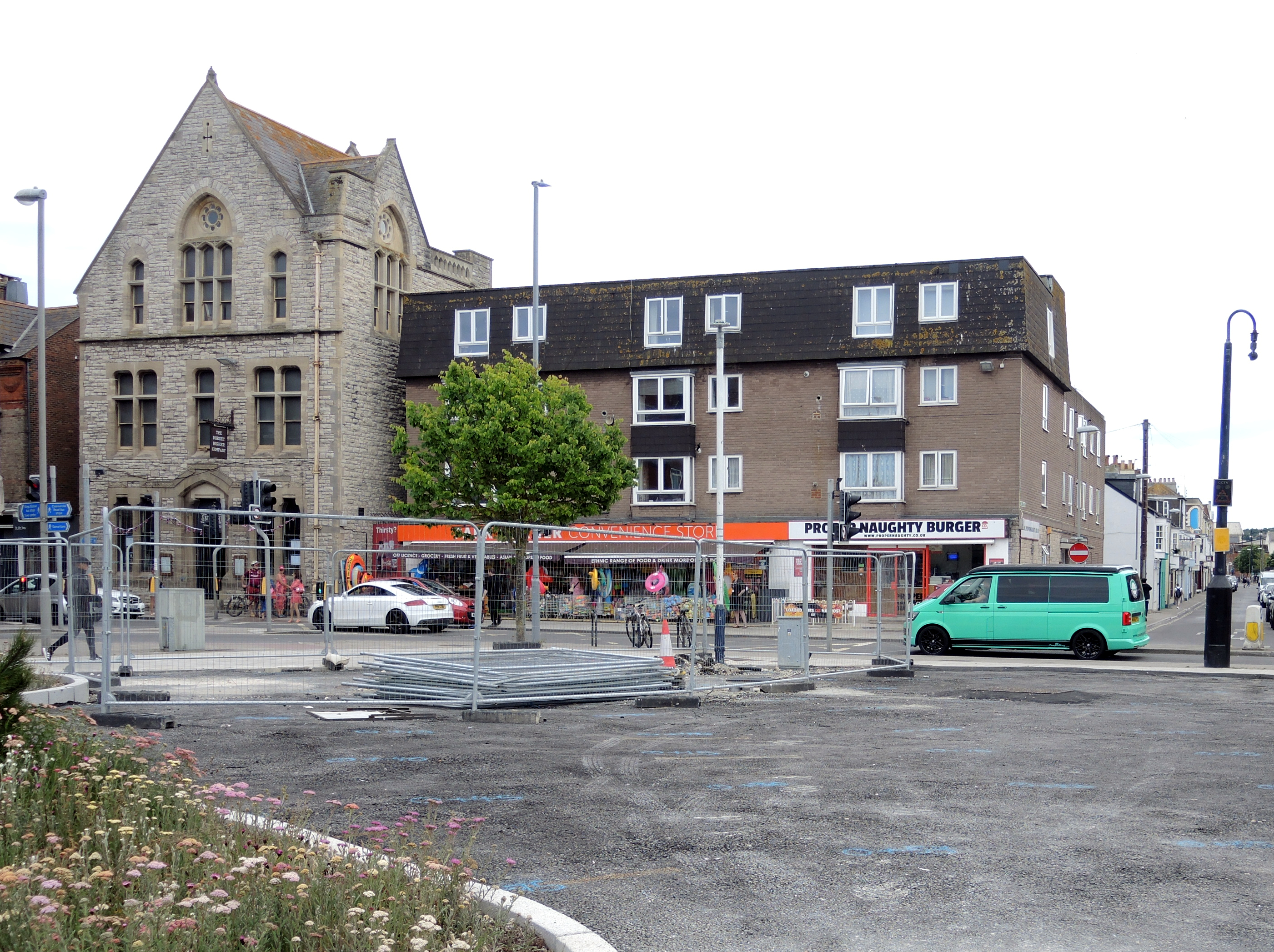
The site of Christ Church is now occupied by Garnet Court.

By the 1930s, falling congregation numbers left Christ Church surplus to requirements, something which was agreed by the Church Commissioners in 1938. Between 1933 and 1938, the highest attendance figures recorded at the church amounted to "merely a handful of people" and only 19 baptisms and four marriages had been held in that period.

In 1938, the Church Commissioners refused a cinema company's offer of £10,000 for the building, on account that a number of parishioners complained it was "sacrilegious that the ground once occupied by a church should be employed for what they regard as the devil's work". The Church Commissioners hoped that "some approved purchaser" could be found instead and the money raised from the sale was to be used for a new mission hall and parish buildings, plus go towards the construction of a new church at Radipole.

In July 1939, an experimental project was announced for the potential transformation of Christ Church into a "Children's Church", where it would be attended and run by children up to the age of about 14. It was envisioned that they would serve roles such as wardens, sidesmen and lay readers, a children's church council would be formed and an unordained young man aged between 18 and 25 would act as the vicar. The project was the idea of the new rector of Weymouth, Rev. E. L. Langston, based on past projects in Wimbledon and Seven Kings where he had allowed children to conduct their own services in parish halls. It was the first project of its kind in the Diocese of Salisbury. A trial period began on 6 August 1939, but the project did not come to fruition due to the outbreak of World War II the following month.

Christ Church closed as a place of worship in September 1939. Rev. Langston stated that the primary reason was that the large church had "so many windows that it would be impossible to black it out, but also the departure of the curate, Rev. C. W. St. Clair Tisdall, left him unable to run two churches himself. With its closure, Rev. Langston gifted furniture from the church to the new St Aldhelm's at Radipole, including the pulpit, font and pews.

In the early period of the war, Christ Church became a wartime social centre, primarily for evacuees but also local residents. It was officially opened as the "Welcome Club" by the Under Secretary to the Ministry of Health, Florence Horsbrugh, on 4 November 1939. From 1941, the church also served as one of Weymouth's British Restaurants, locally called a "Cookery Nook".

Christ Church was demolished in 1956–57 and the site was subsequently used as a car park. In circa 1972, there were plans to build a petrol station on the site, but this not come to fruition and the site was redeveloped as Garnet Court, a residential block with three retail units, completed in 1976. The south gallery of the parish church of St Mary's contains some painted panelling transferred from Christ Church.

== Architecture ==
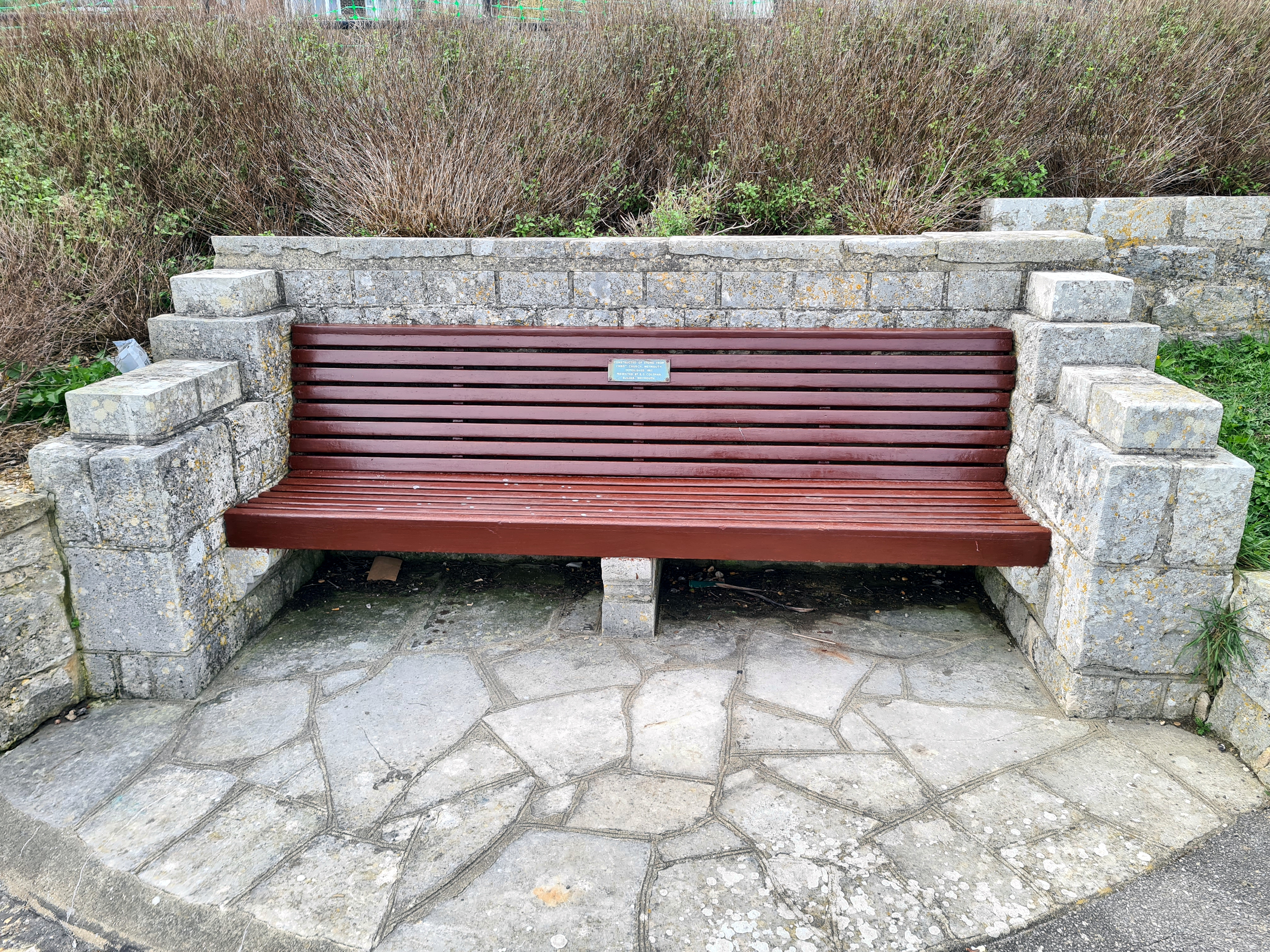
The stone surrounding this bench in Greenhill Gardens was constructed using stone from the demolished Christ Church.

Christ Church was built of Portland stone with Doulting stone dressings. It was made up of a nave, north and south aisles, chancel, vestibule, organ chamber and a 124 feet high tower, with its slate-roofed spire and belfry. Adjoining the church was a small building used as an infant schoolroom. The interior of the church was lined with red brick and pointed with black mortar, with courses of grey bricks along the walls and arches. The main arches were supported by pillars of Pennant stone, with caps and bases of Portland stone, and the chancel arch had two Devon marble pillars. The chancel was laid with encaustic tiles. Original internal fittings included stalls of red pine. The font's base and bowl was of Portland stone and its shaft of Pennant stone.
