= Hope United Reformed Church =

Church in Dorset, England

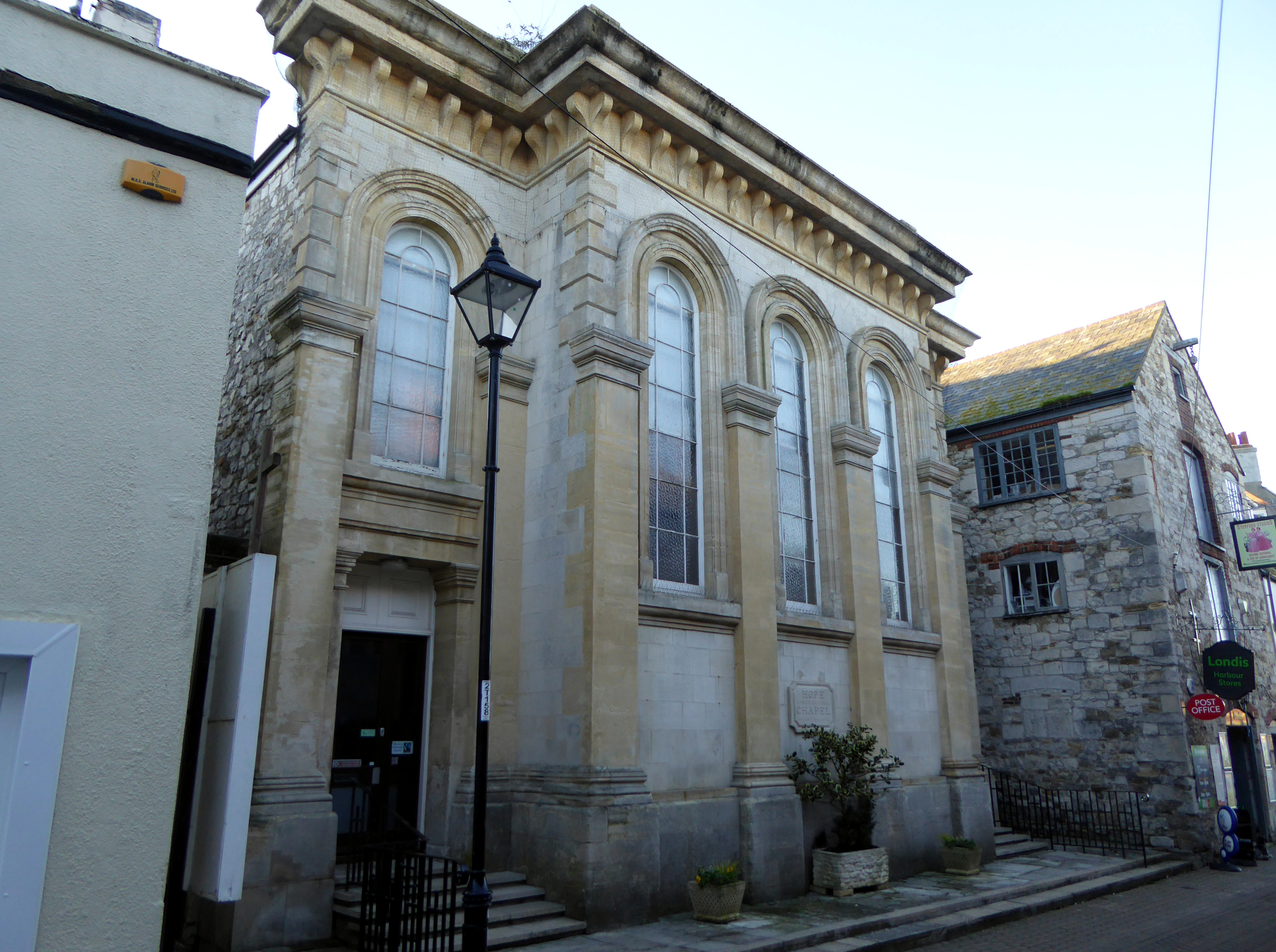

Religion
- Affiliation: United Reformed Church
- Ecclesiastical or organizational status: Closed

Location
- Location: Weymouth, Dorset, England
- Interactive map of Hope United Reformed Church
- Coordinates: 50.6061°N 2.4534°W

Architecture
- Type: Church
- Completed: 1862

Hope United Reformed Church (originally known as Hope Congregational Chapel) is a former United Reformed Church in Weymouth, Dorset, England. It was built in 1861–62 (on the site of an earlier chapel of 1822) and has been a Grade II listed building since 1974. The church closed as a place of worship in 2026.

== History ==
An Independent congregation was formed for the Weymouth side of Weymouth and Melcombe Regis in 1817 when a dwelling at Hope Street was rented and transformed into a place of worship capable of accommodating 100 people. A Church was officially formed in 1821 and November of that year saw fundraising begin for a purpose-built chapel. A plot of land was leased from Sir Frederick Johnstone and the completed chapel was opened on 21 August 1822. The building was later enlarged in 1833 for a cost of £154 and an organ built by Mr. White was installed soon after. In 1859, the organ was rebuilt and enlarged by Messrs. Bevington and Son of London for £130.

By 1860, the original chapel was considered to be "incommodious" and of "unsightly character". A larger place of worship was required, as a result of the growing population of Weymouth. Fundraising began in 1860 and plans were made to demolish the original chapel and build a new one on the same site. Tenders for the rebuilding were sought in February 1861. Of the six received, Mr. A. Williams of Weymouth was accepted for £1,144. The grandfather of Mr. Williams had built the original chapel and his father had also been involved in alterations and improvements to it over the following years.

The foundation stone was laid by Matthew Devenish of Dorchester on 3 April 1861. By this time, £600 had been raised towards the cost of the new building. The Congregational Chapel at Nicholas Street was used by the congregation until the new chapel was completed.

As construction neared completion, the chapel was first used for worship on 1 January 1862, although the public dedication was not held until 5 March when Rev. G. Smith of Poplar preached in the afternoon and Rev. H. B. Ingram of Islington preached in the evening. By the time of its opening, a debt of £300 remained of the £1,617 cost. This was cleared by the end of 1862, following an offer of £50 from Mr. W. Sommerville of Bristol if the remaining debt was cleared by the end of the year.

The Johnstone Estate gifted the freehold of the chapel site in 1871 and the deeds were drawn up by R. N. Howard free of charge. In 1873, 11 St Leonard's Terrace was purchased for £432 for use as a manse for the minister. In 1884, a small mission room was built in the garden for a cost of £100. When the chapel's schoolroom became too small to serve the local children, land behind the chapel was acquired for a new £1,000 schoolroom. The memorial stone was laid by the mayor of the borough, R. N. Howard, on 11 November 1885 and the school opened on 21 April 1886.

In 1971, the Congregational Chapel of 1864 at Gloucester Street was closed and the congregation joined the Hope Chapel. In 2008, the church received a £5,000 grant from the National Churches Trust for repairs. The church closed as a place of worship in 2026, with its final service held on 22 February 2026.

== Architecture ==
Hope United Reformed Church is built of Portland stone, with brick dressings and a slate roof. The adjoining schoolroom of 1885 is built of red brick.
