= Easton, Dorset =

Village in Dorset, England

Coordinates: 50.545345°N 2.436348°W

Easton
- Location within Dorset
- Civil parish: Portland
- Unitary authority: Dorset
- Ceremonial county: Dorset
- Region: South West
- Country: England
- Sovereign state: United Kingdom
- Post town: Portland
- Postcode district: DT5
- Dialling code: 01305
- Police: Dorset
- Fire: Dorset and Wiltshire
- Ambulance: South Western
- UK Parliament: South Dorset

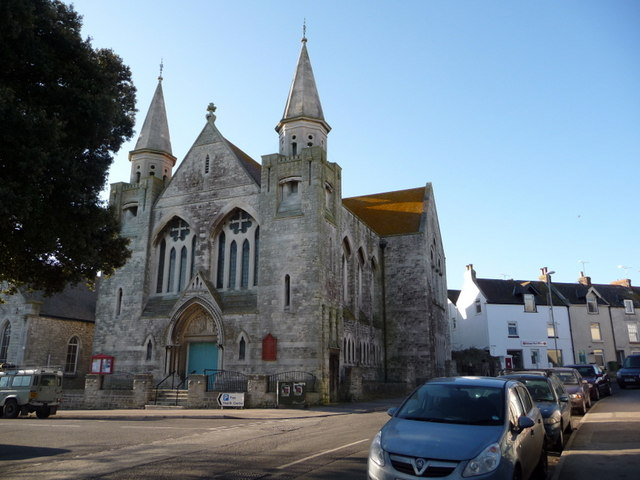
Easton Methodist Church facing the village square.

Easton is a village on the Isle of Portland in Dorset, England. The village is situated at Tophill, within the centre of the island. As with the rest of Portland's villages and settlements, Easton, including the settlements Reforne and Straits, has been designated as a conservation area, as it is a place of special architectural and historic interest. Easton, Wakeham and Reforne were designated pre-1974.

The village has a small square with many shops and shopping arcade, three churches, a small park, and other amenities, including various pubs, as well as the nearby Secondary school Royal Manor Arts College, (which has now been closed down, with the only secondary school on the island being Atlantic Academy Portland). Along with Fortuneswell, Easton is the main hub of the Isle of Portland's activities. St George's Centre and The George Inn lies within the Reforne area of Easton, and provides facilities for many local events.

== History ==
Easton was established around a natural watercourse and various springs, of which there are indications of medieval inhabitants. The village pond was situated at Easton Square, and a well head and pump were later installed in 1775. Easton largely developed through Tophill's prime industry of agriculture. By 1782, Easton was the island's second largest settlement. The island's first school, Maister's School, opened in Straits during 1720. St. George's Church was built as the island's parish church within Reforne, between 1754 and 1766, replacing St Andrew's.

The village saw an infamous event during 1803, known as the Easton Massacre, which saw British armed forces shoot and kill three citizens, when trying to press males of Portland into service. The press gang arrived at Easton Square where they were met by a group of citizens who had gathered to stop them. When one man was taken and the crowd attempted a rescue, the captain fired on them. The marines under his command also opened fire. There were three people killed, and another two wounded, one of whom, Mary Way, later died of her wounds. From the 1840s onwards Portland saw a large increase in its population, leading to Easton expanding, and becoming more urbanised. Both Reforne and Wakeham were separate hamlets until this time, when they merged into Easton.

During the 19th-century, the Easton & Church Hope Railway put forward plans to extend the Weymouth and Portland Railway Line to Easton. On 1 October 1900 Easton station was opened to goods trains, and to the public on 1 September 1902. The line closed to passengers in 1952 and goods trains in 1965. The station site was demolished in 1970, and is now the site of a residential home. In 1904, Easton Square, which had long been barren land, was transformed into Easton Gardens. All Saints Church was built at Straits between 1914 and 1917, and became the new parish church for Tophill. Easton remains one of Portland's main hubs of activity to date.

== Features ==
The area of Easton is surrounded by quarries, both working and non-working. To the south of the village, and near Weston, are the two Portland Windmills. The disused and historic stone towers date from as early as 1608. Both windmills have been separate Grade II Listed monuments since September 1978, and are the only historic windmill remains to survive in Dorset. In early 2011, a Tesco, Portland's first major supermarket was opened in Easton.

The Portland Museum is located near to Easton, in Wakeham, close to Church Ope Cove. The museum was founded by Marie Stopes and opened in 1930. The castellated building at Easton Lane is the Drill Hall of 1868. It was once the home of the Portland Volunteers.

== Grade Listed Features ==
Easton has a wide array of architecture and buildings, a number of which are Grade Listed.

4 Easton Square, 30 Easton Square, 31 Easton Square, a fish house to the north of No. 31 Easton Street, 28 Easton Street, 32 Easton Street, 42 and 44 Easton Street, 41 Easton Street, as well as 23 Delhi Lane and its railings, are all Grade II Listed. Easton Methodist Church, along with its former manse and boundary walls, has been Grade II* Listed since May 1993. The church dates from 1906 and opened in September 1907. The church hall of the church was formerly a Wesleyan school, dated 1878 on porch. It was also designated Grade II. The church is still active today, alongside Underhill Methodist Church, as part of the Portland Methodist Circuit. Within Straits, the area of Easton linking to the hamlet of Wakeham, is the 20th-century Anglican church All Saints Church. It is Grade II Listed.

At Easton Gardens, the prominent Clock Tower, completed in 1907, is Grade II Listed. At Easton Lane is one of various lime kilns remaining on Portland. At the time of becoming Grade II Listed in November 1984, it was abandoned, and in poor condition. It lay in ruin for decades, but by 2002 was turned into a residence and craft workshop. Opposite this lime kiln is another which is larger and more complete, but not Grade Listed.

Within Reforne there are various notable buildings. The Sugar Loaf Cafe, 26 Reforne, 30 Reforne, 107 and 109 Reforne, 135 Reforne, Apsley House (54 Reforne), 111 and 113 Reforne, and 28 Reforne, are all Grade II Listed. St George's Church is found at the far end of Reforne - a Church of England church. The church was designated as a Grade I listed building in January 1951, and is one of three buildings on Portland to be Grade I. Its graveyard wall also became Grade II Listed in September 1978, and in May 1993 the church's lych gate entrance became Grade II Listed too. The George Inn is a public house at Reforne. It is one of the oldest inhabited buildings on the island, and has been Grade II Listed since May 1993. St George's Centre, also in Reforne, was a former school opened in 1857, and now a community information and activity centre. It is Grade II Listed. The centre's community hall and boundary walls to the south are also Grade II listed.
