= St Aldhelm's Church, Radipole =

Church in Dorset, England

St Aldhelm's Church
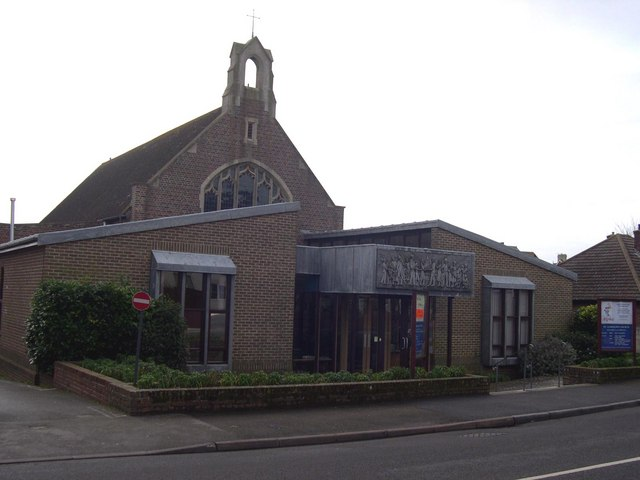

Religion
- Affiliation: Church of England
- Ecclesiastical or organizational status: Active

Location
- Location: Radipole, Weymouth, Dorset, England
- Interactive map of St Aldhelm's Church
- Coordinates: 50.6293°N 2.4646°W

Architecture
- Architect: William Henry Randoll Blacking
- Type: Church
- Completed: 1941

St Aldhelm's Church is a Church of England church in Radipole, Weymouth, Dorset, England. It was designed by William Henry Randoll Blacking and built in 1939–1941, with later additions.

== History ==
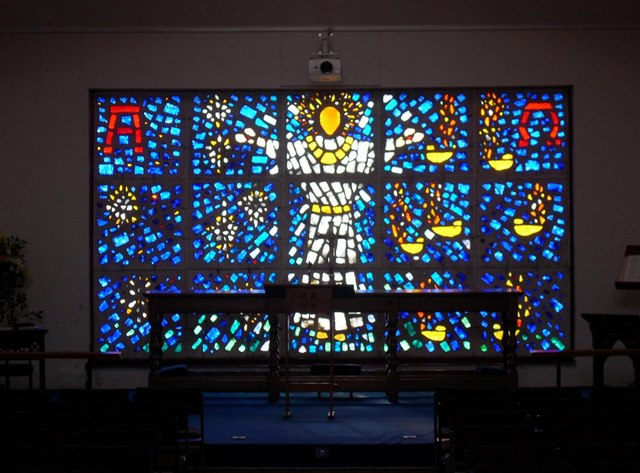
The stained glass of 1985, depicting John's vision of the Son of Man.

St Aldhelm's was built as a result of expansion and development of Radipole, which left the parish church of St Ann unable to provide adequate accommodation. By 1937, Radipole had over 6,000 inhabitants and St Ann was only capable of accommodating 250. Fundraising for the new church began in 1936, and Mr. Alfred A. Hayward donated a plot of land on Spa Road for the church in memory of his wife in December of that year.

In addition to the funds raised by Radipole's parochial church council, a ladies' working party was also formed to raise funds. A donation of £200 was received from Dame Violet Wills of Devon, while grants included £249 from Salisbury Diocesan funds and £300 from the Dorset Church Building Committee. Once £2,000 had been raised, a Diocesan interest-free loan of £2,500 was obtained in 1938. Plans for the new church were drawn up by William Henry Randoll Blacking, and Ralph Fry of Kingsbury Episcopi hired as the builder.

The foundation stone of the church was laid by the Bishop of Salisbury, the Right Rev. Neville Lovett, on 17 October 1939. Owing to limited funds, the church was to be built in phases, with the first phase to include three bays of the nave, the east and west aisles, and a chancel. The cost of this first phase of construction was approximately £4,700. The west end of the church was built with temporary walls as two further bays were due to be added in the future.

With the closure of Christ Church, Weymouth, in 1939, the Rector, Rev. E. L. Langston, gifted furniture from the church to St Aldhelm's, including the pulpit, font and pews. In 1940, Weymouth College also closed and the Rector of Radipole, Rev. W. S. Syson, accepted twelve stalls from the college chapel for installation in St Aldhelm's. A number of memorials were also received from the chapel, including oak panels commemorating boys of the college who lost their lives in World War I. They were placed in a corner of the west aisle to form a memorial chapel.

St Aldhelm's was dedicated by the Bishop of Sherborne, the Right Rev. Harold Rodgers, on 15 March 1941. The Bishop performed the ceremony on behalf of the Bishop of Salisbury, who was unable to attend due to illness. With further fundraising throughout the 1950s, a church hall of Reema construction was built behind the church and dedicated in 1961. It provided a number of community uses, including as a Sunday school and also contained a badminton court. In 1969, the Bishop of Sherborne, the Right Rev. Victor Pike, dedicated a new porch, and clergy and choir vestries, which were all built at the front of the church.

Owing to the growing congregation, the church's interior was altered and the seating realigned in 1979–1980. The church then underwent extension work, after Rev. Richard Luther initiated a scheme to build a new section containing a lounge, kitchen, office, toilets and creche room. The plans were drawn up by K. C. White & Partners. As part of the scheme, a baptistry was also created, the church's pews were replaced by chairs and a new heating system was installed. The extension was dedicated on 21 January 1983 by the Bishop of Sherborne, the Right Rev. John Kirkham. In 2010, planning permission was granted for the church hall to be replaced with a new facility. The £1.8 million St Aldhelm's Church Centre was opened by the Bishop of Sherborne, the Right Rev. Graham Kings, in June 2012.

== Architecture ==
St Aldhelm's is built of Poole bricks, with purple-grey facing Sussex bricks and dressings of Box Ground Bath stone. The piers were constructed using engineering bricks to provide additional strength. The interior is painted white and the ceiling is of five-sided barrel design, with moulded pine ribs and panels. The steps of the original chancel and sanctuary are of Purbeck stone, with artificial stone paving. The nave of the church has flooring of pine wood blocks.

The church retains the memorials received from the college chapel, although the fittings received from Christ Church have since been passed on to other churches. The organ was built by Norman and Beard and rebuilt by Henry Willis & Sons. The church's communion table, font and pulpit are all modern. The church's single bell has since been removed from the bellcote for safety reasons. The chancel contains stained glass gifted to the church by an anonymous person in 1985. It was designed and made by Jon Callan of Dorchester, and depicts John's vision of the Son of Man.
