= St Mary's Church, Weymouth =

Church in Dorset, England

St Mary's Church
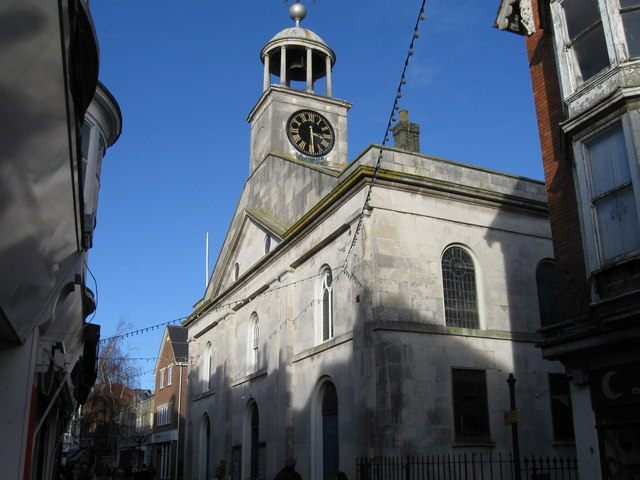

Religion
- Affiliation: Church of England
- Ecclesiastical or organizational status: Active

Location
- Location: Weymouth, Dorset, England
- Interactive map of St Mary's Church
- Coordinates: 50.6082°N 2.4540°W

Architecture
- Architect: James Hamilton
- Type: Church
- Completed: 1817

St Mary's Church is a Church of England parish church in Weymouth, Dorset, England. Built of Portland stone in 1815–1817, the church has been described as having an "austere design in Palladian mode". It has been a Grade I listed building since 1953.

Christ Church, a chapel of ease to St Mary's, also served the town between 1874 and 1939.

== History ==
A church on the site of St Mary's dates back to the 13th century, when a Chantry chapel was first recorded there in 1299. A new church was built on the site in 1605, which replaced St Mary's at Radipole as the parish church of Melcombe Regis in 1606. The decision to build a new church stemmed from the church at Radipole being too small and at an inconvenient location for many parishioners. Furthermore, it was considered that Melcombe Regis was "subject to the incursion of foreign enemies, who might surprise the town during Divine service, and depart before the inhabitants could repair home to make resistance". The church was frequently used by King George III during his visits to Weymouth between 1789 and 1805.

By the early 19th century, the church had become too small to adequately serve the population of Melcombe Regis, and had fallen into a dangerous and dilapidated state. Fundraising for the church to be rebuilt commenced in early 1815, with the appeal noting that the "smallness and inconvenience" of the church had "long been a source of infinite regret to well disposed Christians, and the cause of much injury to Weymouth as a watering place." Furthermore, as a result of the church not being enlarged or improved over the years, non-conformist worship had thrived within the town. Plans for a church capable of accommodating upwards of 2,000 people were drawn up by James Hamilton of Weymouth, with many seats being free and unappropriated for the benefit of the poor and visitors to the seaside resort.

In June 1815, an Act of Parliament was obtained for the rebuilding of the church and tenders from builders were sought that month. The foundation stone was laid by the Bishop of Salisbury, the Right Rev. John Fisher, on 4 October 1815, and the completed church was opened by the Archdeacon of Dorset, the Right Rev. William England, on 23 March 1817. The church underwent major restoration in 1922, which included the rebuilding of the north aisle.
