= Southwell Methodist Chapel =

Chapel in Dorset, England

Coordinates: 50.52947°N 2.44073°W

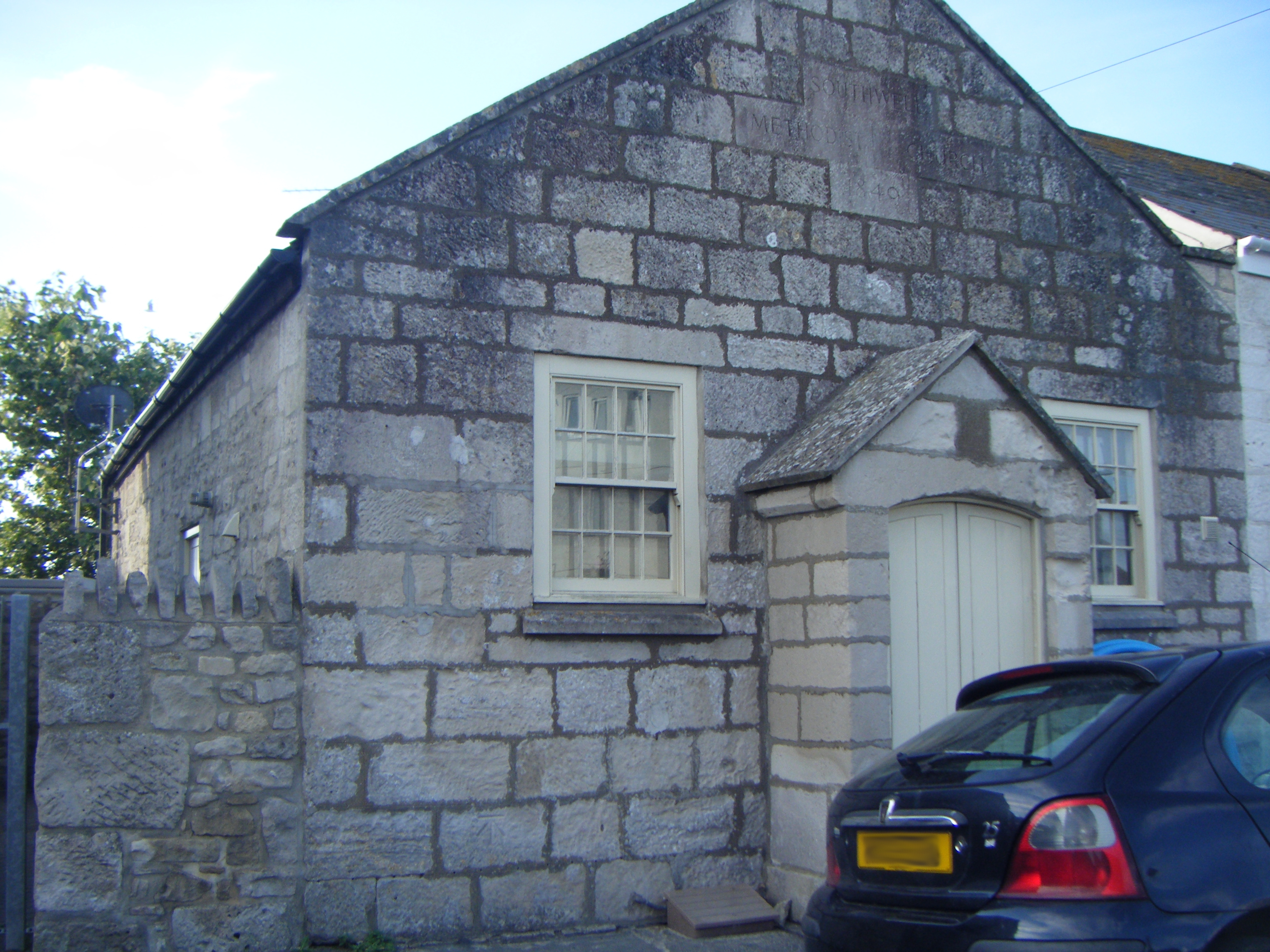
Southwell Methodist Chapel

Southwell Methodist Chapel is a former Methodist chapel at Southwell, on the Isle of Portland, Dorset, England. The chapel was built in 1849 between terraced cottages on the east side of the road leading from Southwell to Portland Bill. It closed in 1997 and is now a private residence. It has been Grade II Listed since May 1993.

By the middle of the 19th-century, government works and defences led to a large increase within Portland's population. This increase saw a revival for the island's non-conformists, who were assisted by the help of influential leaders, as well as the available chapel-building funds available from the new money of the government works. The residents of Southwell had their own small chapel opened during July 1849. Now privately owned, and functioning as a holiday let under the name "Chapel Cottage", the chapel remains a modest but complete manifestation of the importance which Methodism played in the island's social history.
