= Underhill Methodist Church =

Church in Dorset, England

Coordinates: 50.5589°N 2.4403°W

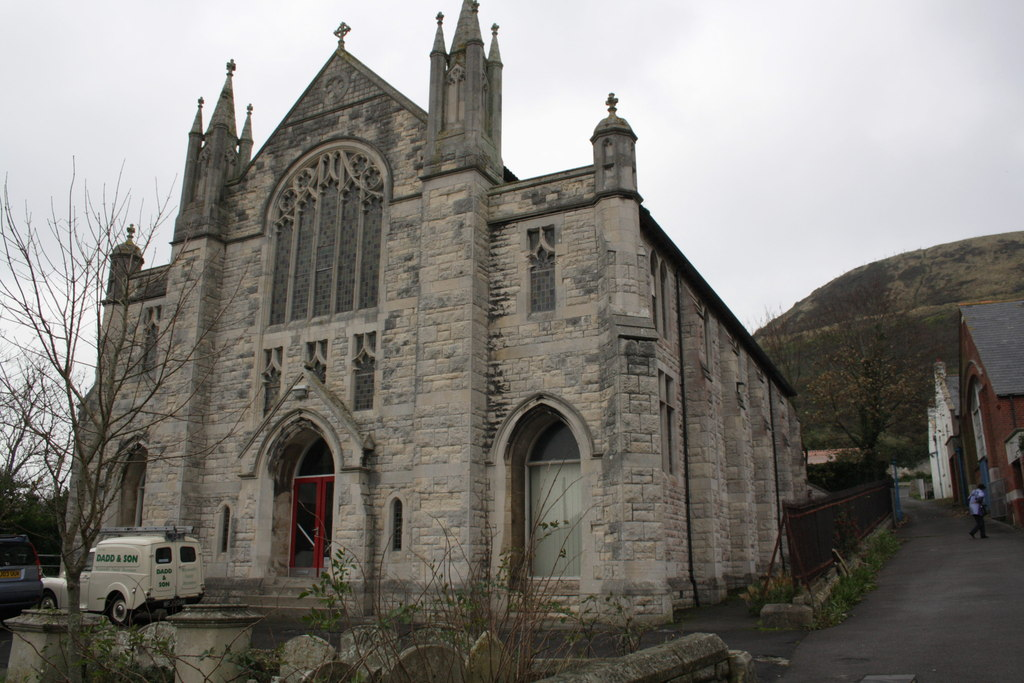
Underhill Methodist Church

Underhill Methodist Church (also known as Brackenbury Memorial Church) is a former Methodist Church, opened in 1899, located in Fortuneswell, on the Isle of Portland, Dorset. It was built between 1898 and 1899, replacing a 1793 chapel built by Robert Carr Brackenbury, the founder of Methodism on Portland. The church is no longer active, but was previously part of the Portland Methodist Circuit, and later the Dorset South and West Circuit, alongside Easton Methodist Church.

== History ==
=== Brackenbury's original chapel (1793) ===
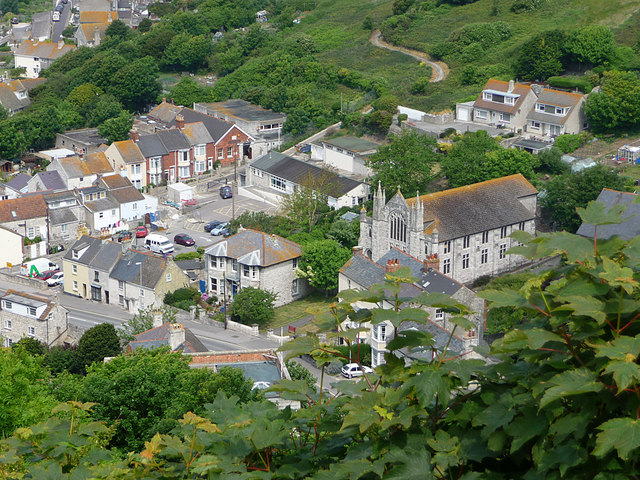
The church stands out prominently as seen from New Ground at Tophill, with Brackenbury House, the former manse, on the left, next to the church.

Robert Carr Brackenbury came to Portland in 1791. He purchased a house on the island, and alongside Mr George Smith, began to preach from his own residence. Soon a Methodist following was established. During that same year Brackenbury built a chapel at his expense within Fortuneswell. It opened by 1793, and had 120 members.

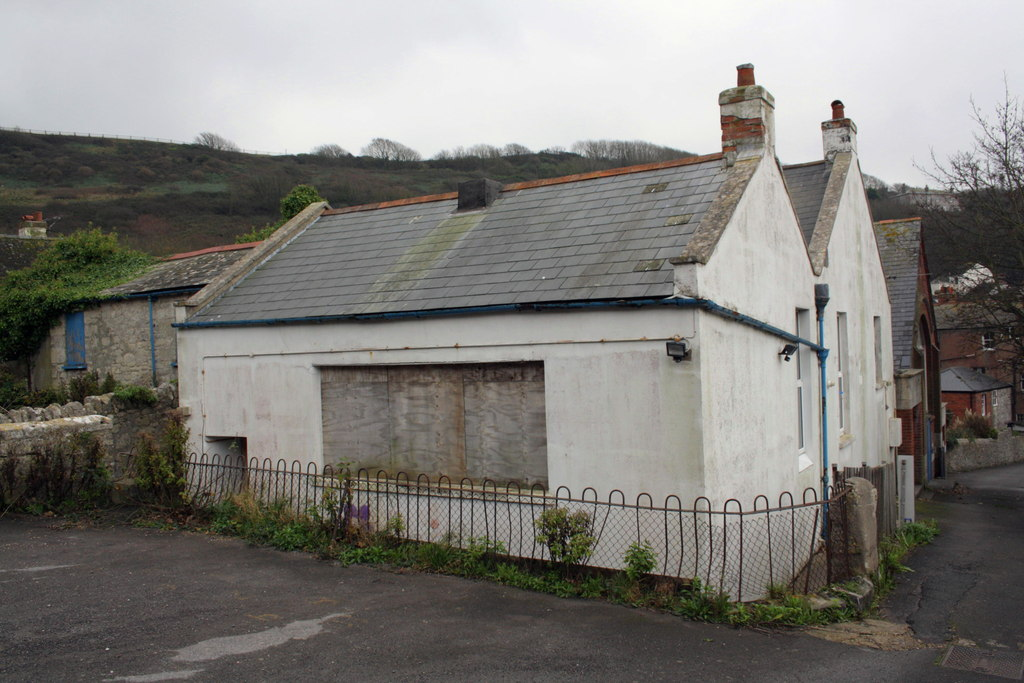
Brackenbury School, now the Brackenbury Centre, is located next to the church.

During 1794, Brackenbury aimed to increase members at Tophill, and purchased a house for use as a chapel within Wakeham. After Brackenbury died in 1818, his wife had the first purpose-built chapel constructed at Tophill in 1825. During the first half of the 19th century, the construction of new schools were essential on Portland, and a Wesleyan School at Fortunewell was built for 200 children in 1841. It opened in May 1845. It took the same name as the chapel, becoming the Brackenbury Day School.

=== Construction of Underhill Methodist Church (1898–1899) ===
The 19th-century construction of Portland Harbour's Breakwaters, and the other associated works, led to a large increase within Portland's population. Brackenbury's chapel had become too small and fallen into a poor condition by this time. It was decided that a new church should be built, and was to be called Brackenbury Memorial Church. The foundation stones were laid in 1898, and the church was completed by 1899. The church cost over £3,200 to build, and was declared open in 1899 for Divine Service on Whit Monday.

In 1903, Brackenbury's original chapel was demolished, and the new Wesleyan manse erected on the same site. This was Brackenbury House, located just below the new church. The increasing Methodist population on the island led to the Tophill's Easton Methodist Church being built between 1906 and 1907.

With the outbreak of World War II, Portland was a natural target for German aircraft, due to the importance of island's naval base. On 11 August 1940, the church was damaged by bombing. During the late 1990s, renovations were carried out on the church.

The church building was sold on 19 April 2024, and the funds used to help toward the refurbishment of Easton Methodist Church.
