= St George's Centre =

Former school in Dorset, England

Coordinates: 50.5469°N 2.4407°W

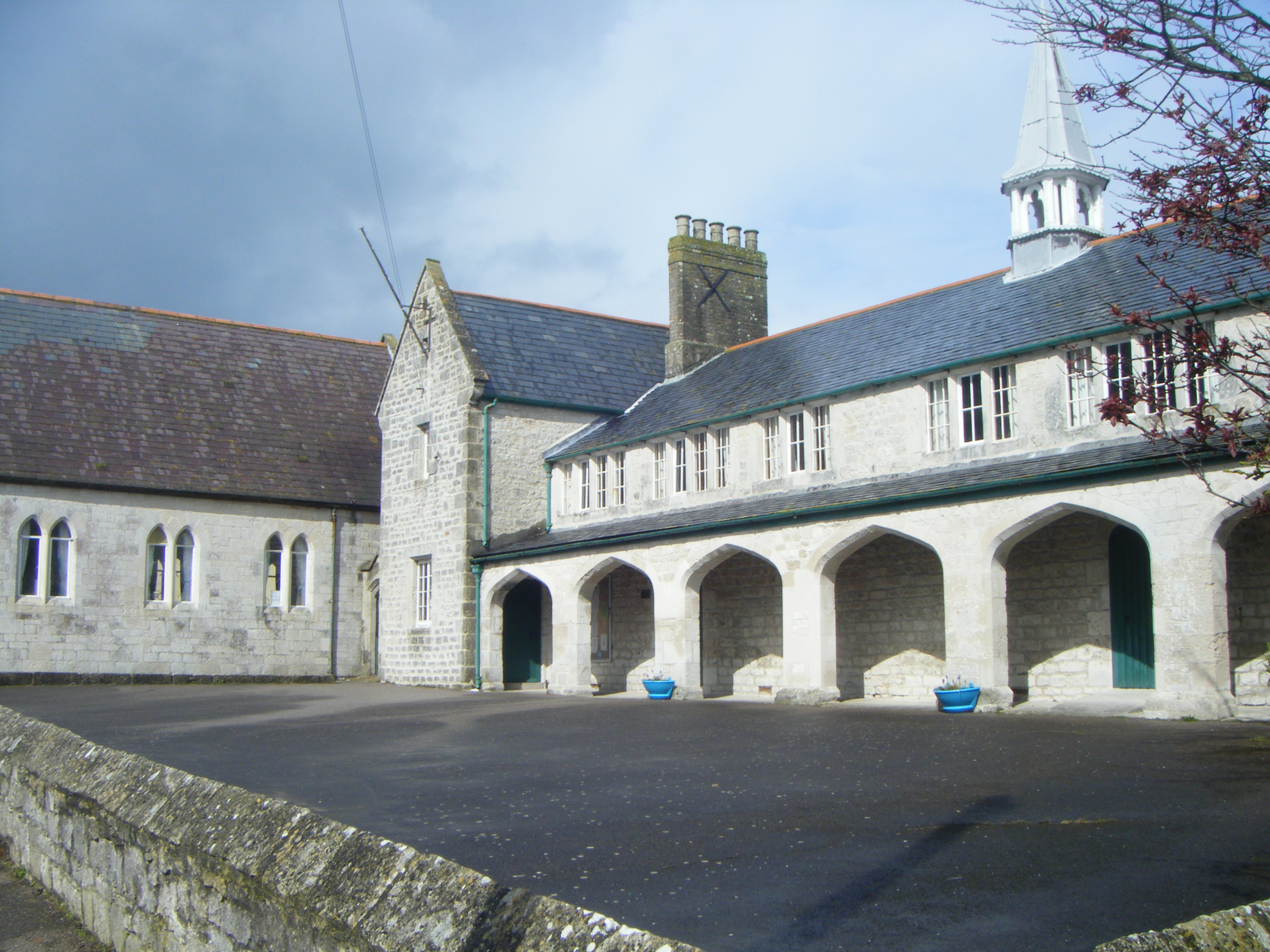
St George's Centre.

St George's Centre is a former school, built in the 19th century, and now a community information and activity centre on the Isle of Portland, Dorset, England. It is located in the area of Reforne, near the village of Easton. Both the centre and its community hall, which was formerly the school assembly hall, have been a Grade II listed since 1978.

== History ==
St George's School opened in 1857, having been constructed by Hansford and Waight for the cost of £775. It served the children of Tophill, while St John's School, which opened the same year, served Underhill. The school closed in 1969, leaving the building to suffer from years of neglect and vandalism. In 1981, the newly formed Island of Portland Heritage Trust began fundraising to purchase the building from the Crown Estate Commissioners. The trust were successful and then proceeded to transform the building into a community and craft centre which opened in 1984.

The project created over fifty jobs for the unemployed, while the trust, in conjunction with the West Country Tourist Board, opened Portland's first tourist information centre there. The trust continues to own and maintain the building, and relies on hall hire and workshop fees to cover the building's maintenance and overheads. The centre continues to run various programmes and is used by many local organisations. The building's halls consist of the Peter Trim Community Hall, Girt Hall and the Skylark Studio.
