= Weymouth Baptist Church =

Church in Dorset, England

Religion
- Affiliation: Baptist
- Ecclesiastical or organisational status: Active

Location
- Location: Weymouth, Dorset, England
- Country: United Kingdom
- Interactive map of Weymouth Baptist Church
- Coordinates: 50.6079°N 2.4517°W

Architecture
- Type: Church
- Completed: 1814

Listed Building – Grade II
- Official name: Baptist Chapel and Attached Schoolroom
- Designated: 12 December 1953
- Reference no.: 1365872

Weymouth Baptist Church is a Baptist Church in Weymouth, Dorset, England. It was built in 1813-14 by George Welsford as part of the terrace known as Bank Buildings, found at the southern end of Weymouth Esplanade. The church has been a Grade II listed building since 1953, with the attached schoolroom being added to the listing in 1974.

== History ==
Weymouth's Baptist Church was built by George Welsford in 1813-14 and opened on 27 July 1814, with Rev. Dr. Ryland, Rev. Page and Rev. Saffery preaching over the course of the day.

The church was enlarged in 1828 with the addition of galleries. The original facade was styled in the form of two matching houses, but this was replaced in 1859 with a Doric facade. The schoolroom to the rear was built in 1864, while the church was re-pewed and re-lighted at the same time.

The chapel suffered extensive damage in 1889 after a fire ignited due to a defect in the building's heating apparatus. Further expansion of the church was seen in 1928 when the two adjoining houses were purchased, demolished and replaced with a brick building. The church stored Weymouth's archives during World War II.
