= Weymouth Guildhall =

Municipal building in Weymouth, Dorset, England

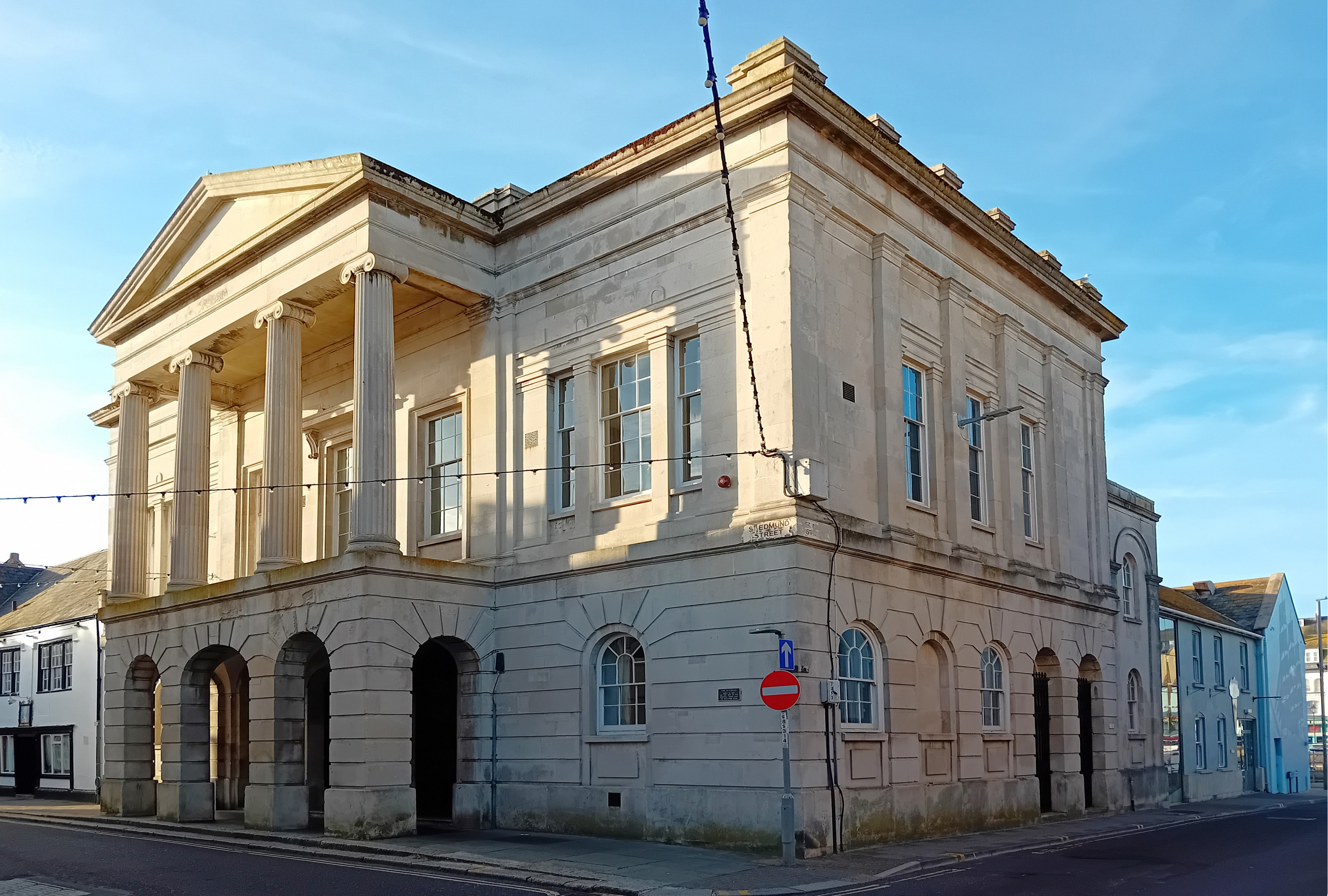
- Guildhall

- Location within Dorset
- 50°36′27″N 2°27′15″W
- Location: Weymouth, Dorset

History
- Built: 1837

Site notes
- Architect: Talbot Bury

Listed Building – Grade II*
- Designated: 12 December 1953
- Reference no.: 1132630

Weymouth Guildhall is a former guildhall at Weymouth, Dorset, England. The building, which was constructed in the 1830s, is a Grade II* listed building.

== History ==
Weymouth Guildhall was designed by Talbot Bury and constructed between 1836 and 1837. It was built of Portland stone and includes a "tall projecting portico" and "grand entrance hall". Opened on 25 June 1838, the local council used the upper floor council chamber and court room, while a police station, including cells, was established on the ground floor. The Royal Commission on the Historical Monuments of England described the building as a "suitably dignified building" with a "formal classical statement", but added that it "cannot be fully appreciated as it faces a narrow street". The design included a portico, arcaded on the ground floor, with four large Ionic order columns at the first floor level and a pediment above.

Upon its completion, the guildhall replaced the existing facilities of the Melcombe Regis Town Hall, which had been on the same site, and Weymouth Town Hall. Petty sessions for Portland and district were held in the courtroom while the chief of the borough police was based in the police station.

The police relocated to new premises on the Dorchester Road in 1955; however the Weymouth & Portland Borough Council continued to use the building for meetings into the 21st century. In 2010, some members of the council called for the building to be sold. Most of the building was vacant and it faced essential repair costs. By then the building was still home to the registry office, and an area was in use by the Weymouth Community Volunteers; however the council were holding only a few meetings there each year. The council carried out some essential repair work in 2013 and then sold the building to James Braxton of Antiques Road Trip fame in 2014. At the time, Braxton announced his intention to preserve the building's history and "bring access back" by using the building as both a wedding venue and family holiday lets.

Notable items inside the guildhall include a 16th century chest in the courtroom, the Royal Arms of King James VI and I, of King George I and of Queen Victoria in the council chamber and a white marble statue of the former mayor, Samuel Weston, on the staircase.

== See also ==
- Guild
- Guildhall
