= Gloucester House =

Former royal residence in Dorset, England

Coordinates: 50.6139°N 2.4534°W

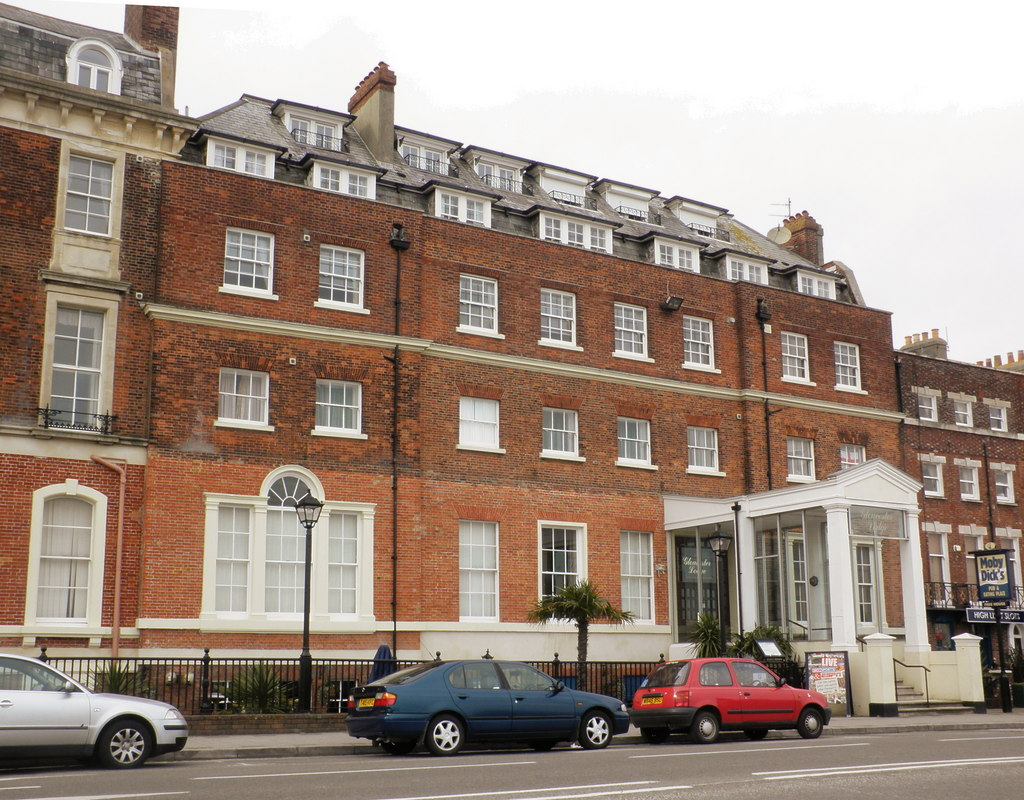
Gloucester Lodge

Gloucester Lodge is a former royal residence on the esplanade in the seaside resort of Weymouth on the south coast of England. It was the summer residence of Prince William Henry, Duke of Gloucester and Edinburgh (1743–1805), fourth son of Frederick, Prince of Wales, and brother of King George III. During his recovery from porphyria in 1789, George III spent some time convalescing there. The king occupied the right-hand part of the building, and had use of the garden, where the later, left wing stands. His doctors encouraged him to visit the resort to benefit from the sea air and salt water. The patronage of the king was important in drawing fashionable society to the south coast town.

Having been a hotel for most of the 20th century, the building then became a private residence, having been renamed Gloucester Lodge after conversion into flats. The lower ground floor contains a pub and restaurant that was known as the Cork and Bottle, but has now changed names and is called The Gloucester.

== The building ==
Gloucester Lodge is a Grade II* listed building, having been added to the register on 12 December 1953. The house was built in about 1780 and a major extension was added on the south side in 1850. A fire destroyed much of the interior and it was refurbished in 1927.

The whole building has a double mansard roof with a valley in the centre. The original building occupying the right side of the range was built as an eight-bay two storey house but now has three storeys, with two levels of attics and a basement. The centre four bays are slightly recessed and the main doorway is in bay 6, with a pedimented portico and flight of steps up from the pavement. There is a range of six recessed, sashed dormer windows at parapet level. The other two storeys also have sashed windows, those on the upper floor with twelve panes and those on the lower one six panes. The more modern range to the south was added in 1850 and has three storeys, attic and basement. The esplanade front has six dormer windows with segmented roofs, the floors underneath having sash windows with stone surrounds. There is a large projecting balcony at ground level. The verandah is supported by cast iron columns rising from the basement, the part of the building now occupied by the Cork and Bottle Public house.
