= St John's Church, Weymouth =

Church in Dorset, England

St John's Church
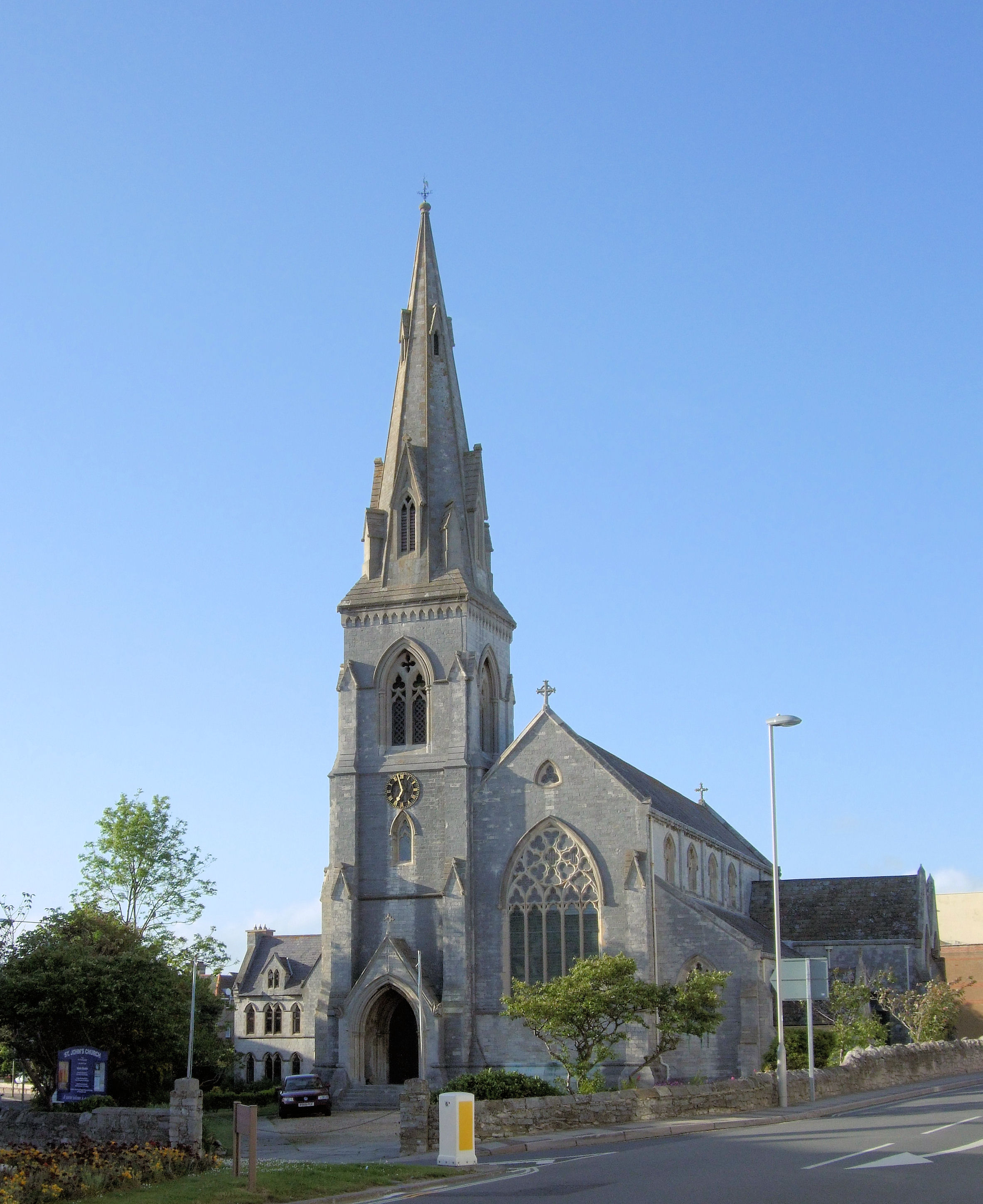

Religion
- Affiliation: Church of England
- Ecclesiastical or organizational status: Active
- Year consecrated: 1854

Location
- Location: Weymouth, Dorset, England
- Interactive map of St John's Church
- Coordinates: 50.6193°N 2.4504°W

Architecture
- Architect: Talbot Bury
- Type: Church

St John's Church is a large evangelical Church of England church in Weymouth, Dorset, England. It was built in 1850–1854 to the designs of Talbot Bury and is a Grade II* listed building.

== History ==
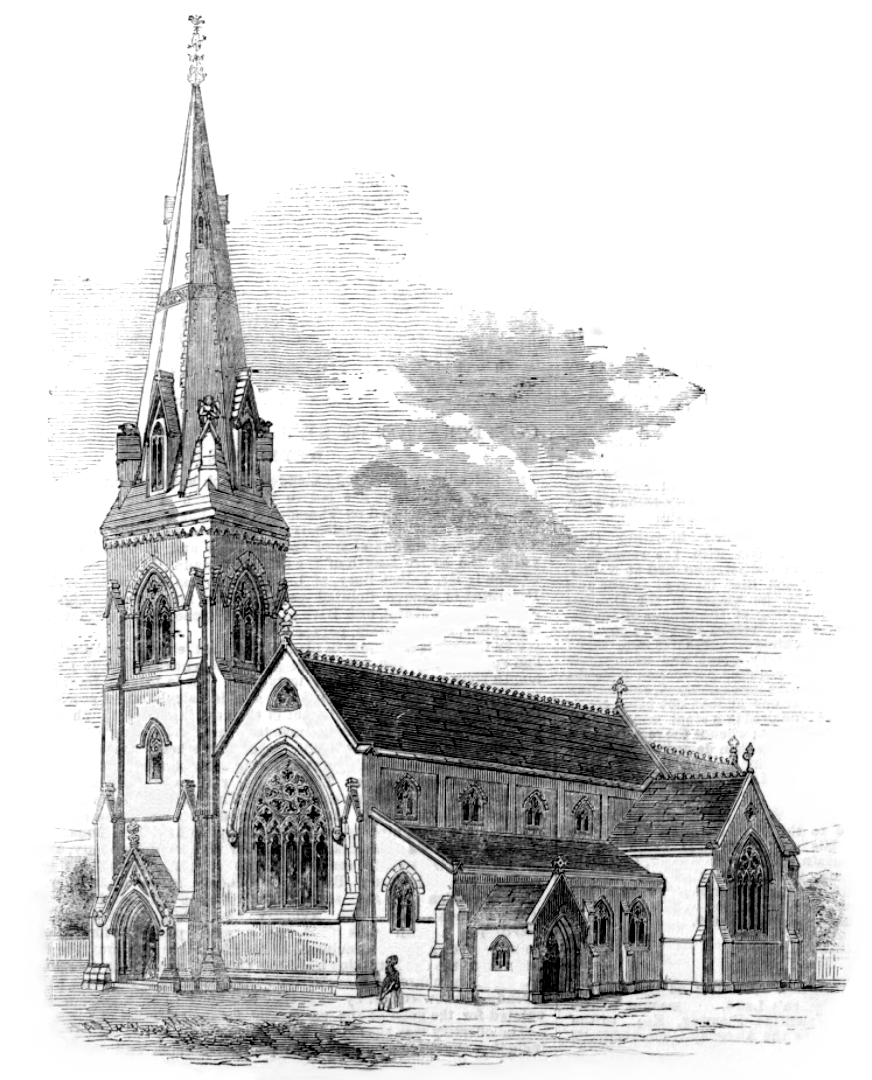
An illustration of St John's Church, published in the Illustrated London News in 1854.

St John's was built as a chapel of ease for the parish of Radipole at an approximate cost of £3,500. The plans for the new church were drawn up by Talbot Bury of London and provided accommodation for up to 800 people. The foundation stone was laid in front of a large gathering of clergymen and spectators by Rev. Edmund Holland on 10 September 1850.

By the end of 1852, the church's exterior was complete except for the porch. St John's was consecrated by the Bishop of Salisbury, the Right Rev. Walter Kerr Hamilton, on 19 October 1854.

As the parish's population continued to grow during the mid-19th century, the church accommodation provided by St John's was considered inadequate by 1868. Plans for the church's enlargement were drawn up by R. C. Bennett of Weymouth. An additional 320 sittings were provided by the work, which was carried out by T. Dodson of Weymouth.

== Architecture ==
St John's is built of Ridgeway Hill stone, with dressings in Bath and Caen stone. The south-west tower and spire stands at a height of approximately 150 feet. Original fittings include a pulpit of Caen stone, and a stone reredos and sedilia at the east end of the church. The roof and seating is made of stained and varnished deal.
