= Avalanche Memorial Church =

Church in Dorset, England

Coordinates: 50.5305°N 2.4431°W

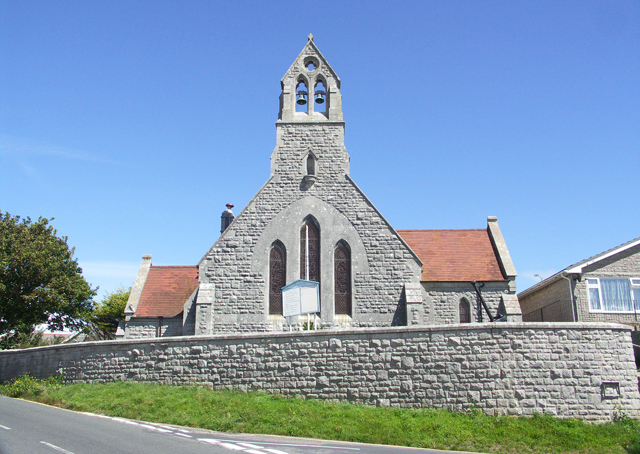
Avalanche Memorial Church

The Avalanche Memorial Church, also known as the Church of St Andrew, is a Church of England church in Southwell, on the Isle of Portland, Dorset, England. It was built in 1879 and remains active as part of the Portland Parish. The church, along with its boundary wall, has been a Grade II Listed building since September 1978.

The church was designed C.R. George Crickmay in an early English style. Built by Lynham and Bayliss of Portland, it was completed in 1879 and consecrated by the Bishop of Salisbury on 3 July. The church is not to be confused with the ruins of Portland's first parish church, the 13th century St Andrew's Church.

== History ==
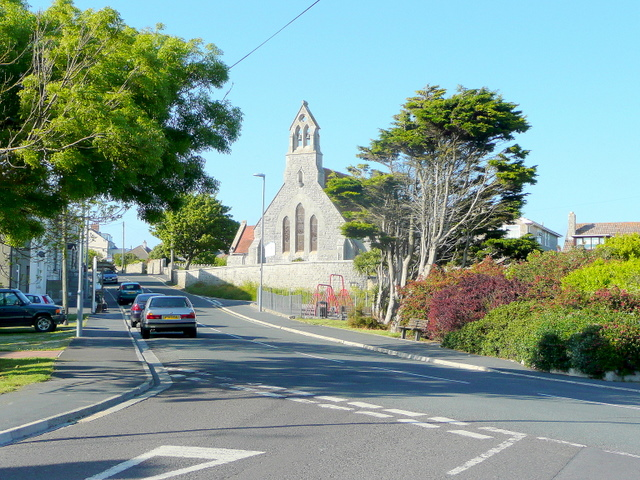
Avalanche Memorial Church and surrounding area.

In September 1877, two ships, the SS Avalanche of the Shaw Savill Line and the SS Forest, collided off Portland Bill during stormy conditions. The Avalanche was taking 63 passengers to their homes in New Zealand, while the Forest had a crew of 22. The tragedy claimed the lives of 106 people, and by the dawn local fishermen at Chesil Cove rescued the survivors and brought them ashore. The disaster became national news and a national campaign was launched, raising £2,000 in donations for a new church to be erected as a memorial.

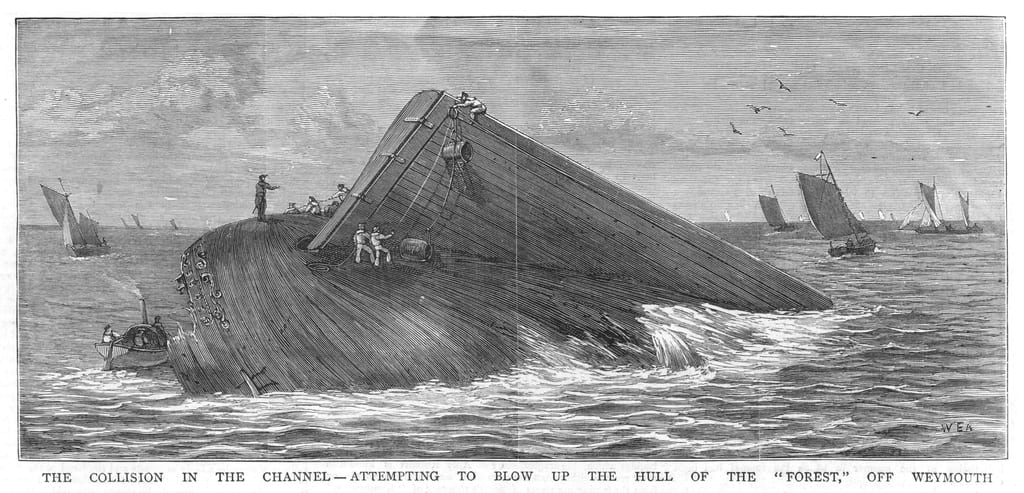
The collision in the Channel, attempting to blow up the Hull of the Forest, off Weymouth, The Graphic, 1877

The church features memorials to those drowned and testimonials to the bravery of the local fishermen. Some of the windows, the lectern, and the pulpit were funded by relatives and friends of those who drowned. There is a picture of the Avalanche, an artist's impression of the two Portland lerrets coming into land after the rescue and a framed copy of the testimonial presented to William Flann. There is also a brass tablet listing the names and, where known, the descriptions of the passengers and crew of the Avalanche. The most notable artifact is the large anchor of the Avalanche, which was raised and donated to the church in 1984.
