= Easton Methodist Church =

Church in Dorset, England

Coordinates: 50.5589°N 2.4403°W

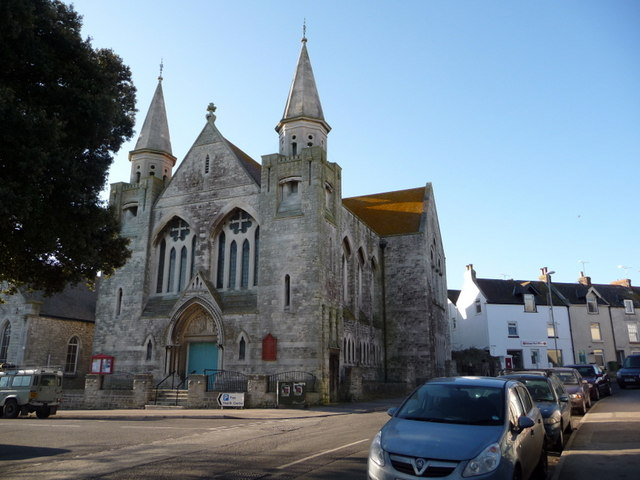
Easton Methodist Church

Easton Methodist Church is a Methodist Church in Easton, on the Isle of Portland, Dorset, which was built in 1906–07. The church, along with its former manse and boundary walls, has been a Grade II* Listed since May 1993. Its church hall was formerly a Wesleyan school, dated 1878 on the porch. The school, with the boundary wall, was designated Grade II in May 1993. The church remains active to date, as part of the Dorset South and West Methodist Circuit.

== History ==
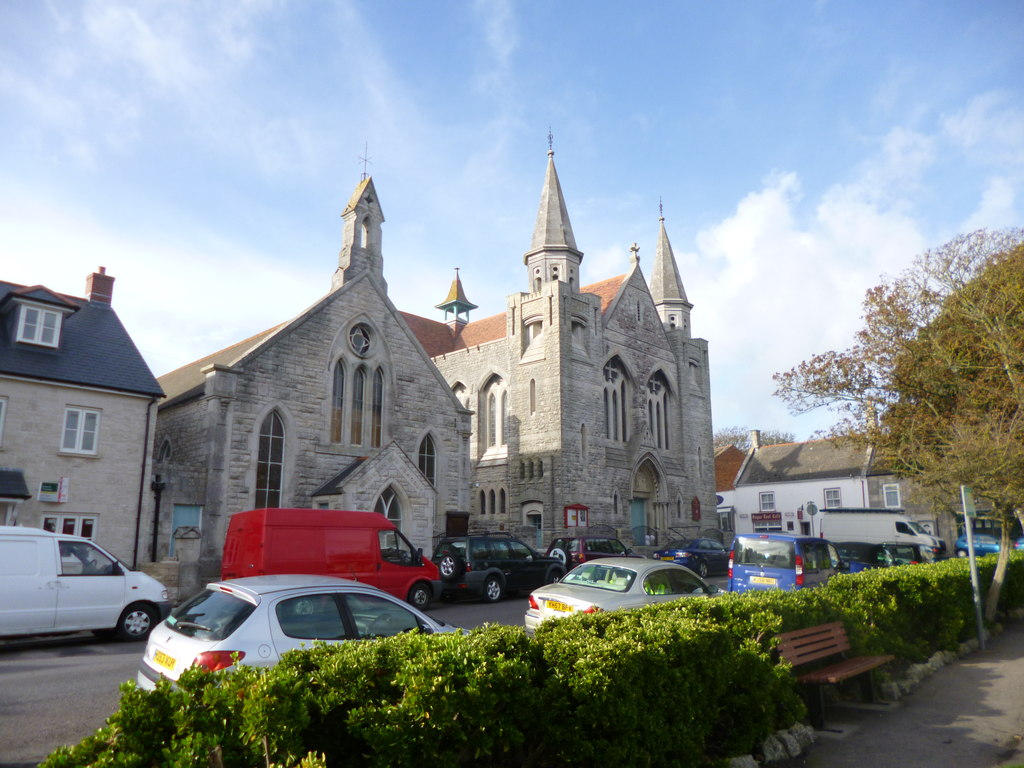
Easton Methodist Church, with the 1878 Wesley School on the left

Robert Carr Brackenbury, of Lincolnshire, came to Portland in 1791. Alongside Mr George Smith, the pair successfully established a Methodist following on Portland. By 1793 Brackenbury had a chapel built at his sole expense in Fortuneswell. However, the 19th-century construction of Portland Harbour's Breakwaters, and the other associated government works and defences, led to a large increase within Portland's Methodist population. A Wesleyan Church at Easton was built in 1854, and in 1878 a Wesleyan School within the village followed, built to accommodate 227 children. By the end of the 19th-century, the decision was made to build a new Methodist church, known as Underhill Methodist Church, by 1899, replacing Brackenbury's original chapel.

The increasing Methodist community led to the need for a Tophill church, and this was built between 1906 and 1907. It was designed by Latrobe and Weston of Bristol, and built by builders Wakeham Brothers of Plymouth, for a total cost of £7,000. As it was sited alongside the 1878 Wesleyan School, the school building was transformed into the church hall. Easton Methodist Church is still active today as part of the Dorset South and West Methodist Circuit. The congregation is currently at approximately 30 members, and the church is often the host of many different events for the community.

== Design ==
The twin-spired church, which seats 900, is made of rock-faced snecked Portland stone with ashlar dressings, or rubble, and has a plain tile roof. The twin-towered front, transepts with semi-octagonal apse containing organ gallery, and a low flat-roofed vestry are all designed with a mixture of late muscular Gothic with Art Nouveau detailing. The central doorway is in French High Gothic style.

The interior of the church features a three-bay nave with two-bay transepts, and mosaic floors. There are galleries on three sides of the church. A grand organ and case is behind a tall moulded painted arch, and surrounded by choir seating; which consist of plain pews. The pulpit and reading desk is made of Portland stone, bowed front with the high relief carving of The Last Supper. The church's mannered, robust exterior conceals an unusually rich interior, all of which has been retained unchanged and helps to demonstrate the strength of Methodism on the island.

The church hall was formerly a Wesleyan school, dating 1878 on the porch, reading "Wesleyan 1878 School". It is a cruciform building, but probably built first as a single hall to which 'transept' and rear wing was later added. The north side was linked to the main church by a 1906 wall with door.
