= United Reformed Church, Upwey =

Church in Dorset, England

United Reformed Church
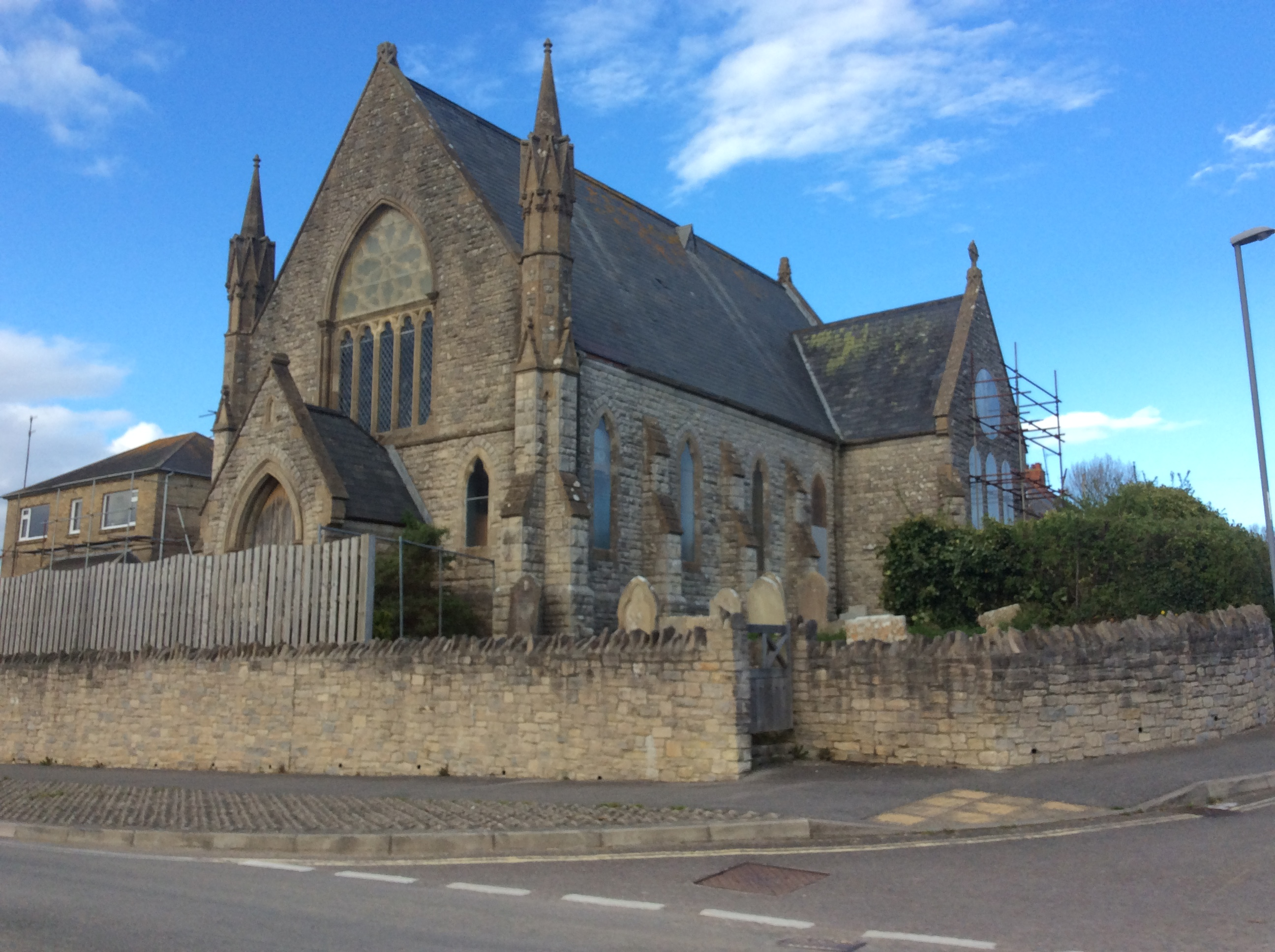

Religion
- Affiliation: United Reformed Church

Location
- Location: Upwey, Dorset, England
- Interactive map of United Reformed Church
- Coordinates: 50.6583°N 2.4679°W

Architecture
- Architect: Robert C. Bennett
- Type: Church
- Completed: 1881

The United Reformed Church (originally known as the Congregational Chapel) is a former United Reformed Church in Upwey, Dorset, England. It was built between 1880 and 1881. It closed as a place of worship in 1992 and the building is now under private ownership.

== History ==
Independent worship in Upwey began around the beginning of the 19th century, when Rev. B. Cracknell, a minister at Weymouth, was granted a license to use his own residence in Upwey to hold services. This was followed in c. 1807 by another resident of the village, Mr. George Wood, who transformed a room in one of his cottages for Thursday evening services, which were conducted by ministers of Weymouth. The success of these services and the need for larger accommodation led Mr. Wood to erect Upwey's first independent chapel on his own land and at his own expense. It was built in 1809–10 and opened on 13 December 1810 by Rev. R. Keynes of Blandford Forum. Ministers from surrounding neighbourhoods preached at Upwey, with Mr. Wood taking responsibility for reading sermons on occasions when no minister was available. The first pastor of Upwey, Rev. James Le Couteur, was ordained on 2 May 1838. The chapel was enlarged during the pastorate of Rev. Joseph Price (1870–74).

In 1875, Rev. John Shadrack Butcher became pastor of Upwey. Owing to the need for greater accommodation than the existing chapel could afford, Shadrack began efforts to have a replacement constructed. A plot of land was purchased for £145 and plans drawn up by Mr. Robert C. Bennett of Weymouth. The building contract was awarded to Mr. John Patten of Portland and construction work began before the ceremony was held for the laying of a memorial stone on 16 June 1880 by Mr. J. J. Norton, Sheriff of Poole. The church cost £1,490 and was opened for its first service on 18 May 1881, with Rev. Dr. J. G. Rogers of Clapham preaching. The original chapel was sold to Sir Richard Howard for £190. A manse was built on land adjoining the new church in 1892. The cost of the land was £120 and the manse £515.

With a drop in congregation numbers, the church was faced with the threat of closure in the 1950s, however this was avoided when it formed a partnership with the congregational church at Radipole in the mid-1950s and when Rev. W. Charles Stacey took the Upwey pastorship in 1958. The church was later renamed Upwey United Reformed Church in 1972 and the manse sold the same year. The church suffered storm damage in February 1990 but was subsequently repaired through voluntary effort by June of that year. In July 1992, the last service was held and the church was then sold to a private owner.

== Architecture ==
The church is built in the Decorated style and designed to accommodate 300 persons. It was built to contain a nave, two transepts, apse, porch and two vestries. An intended schoolroom was not built as part of the original work due to funding limitations, but constructed in the early 20th century. Many of the church's fittings and decorations were made from varnished pitch pine. Mrs. Samson, the daughter of Mr. Wood, gifted the chapel with a stained glass window in memory of her parents.
