= Radipole (ward) =

Electoral ward in Dorset, England

- ward Dorset Council
- Population: 9,684
- Major settlements: Radipole

Current ward
- Created: 2019
- Councillor: Matt Bell (Liberal Democrats)
- Councillor: Louise Brown (Liberal Democrats)
- Number of councillors: 2

Radipole is an electoral ward in Dorset. Since 2019, the ward has elected 2 councillors to Dorset Council.

== History ==
In 2022, David Gray left the Liberal Democrats to sit as an Independent.

== Geography ==
The Radipole ward covers the Weymouth suburbs of Radipole and Southill.

== Councillors ==
Election	Councillors	
2019	Pete Barrow (Liberal Democrats)	David Gray (Liberal Democrats) Became an independent in 2022
2022	Pete Barrow (Liberal Democrats)	David Gray (Liberal Democrats) Became an independent in 2022
2024	Matt Bell (Liberal Democrats)	Louise Brown (Liberal Democrats)

== Election ==
=== 2019 Dorset Council election ===
2019 Dorset Council election: Radipole (2 seats)
Party	Candidate	Votes	%	±%
Liberal Democrats	Peter Lawrence Fraser Barrow	1,346	51.3	
Liberal Democrats	David Michael Gray	1,234	47.0	
Conservative	Peter Dickenson	709	27.0	
Conservative	John Twidale Ellis	671	25.6	
Labour	Mark Duxbury	541	20.6	
Labour	Grafton Alphonso Straker	62	2.4	
Majority				
Turnout		2,624	36.48	
Liberal Democrats win (new seat)				
Liberal Democrats win (new seat)				

=== 2024 Dorset Council election ===
2024 Dorset Council election: Radipole (2 seats)
Party	Candidate	Votes	%	±%
Liberal Democrats	Matt Bell	1,427	64.3	+13.0
Liberal Democrats	Louise Brown	1,123	50.6	+3.6
Labour	Pauline Crump	486	21.9	+1.3
Conservative	George Granycome	464	20.9	−6.1
Conservative	James William Farquharson	457	20.6	−5.0
Turnout		2,220	30.66	
Liberal Democrats hold		Swing		
Liberal Democrats hold		Swing		

== See also ==
- List of electoral wards in Dorset
