= St Laurence's Church, Upwey =

Church in Dorset, England

St Laurence's Church
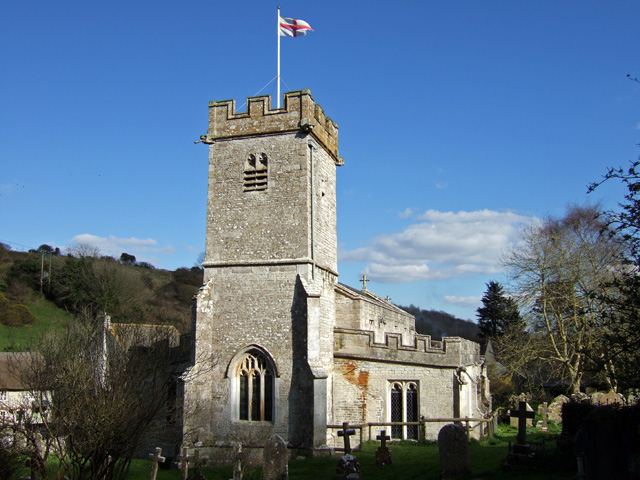

Religion
- Affiliation: Church of England
- Ecclesiastical or organizational status: Active

Location
- Location: Upwey, Dorset, England
- Interactive map of St Laurence's Church
- Coordinates: 50.6658°N 2.4816°W

Architecture
- Type: Church

St Laurence's Church is a Church of England parish church in Upwey, Dorset, England. Much of the existing church dates to the late 15th century, with some earlier fabric and later additions of the 19th and 20th centuries. It is a Grade II* listed building.

== History ==
It is believed that a church has existed at Upwey, on a site near the Wishing Well, since before the Norman conquest of England in 1066. The earliest reference to a church of St Laurence dates to 1201, with the first known priest being John Wydeston in 1267. The existing church largely dates from the late 15th century, with elements of the nave, north aisle, west tower and north porch dating to this period. Earlier fragments dating to the 13th or 14th century have been recorded. A west gallery was added to the church in 1685, followed by a south one during the early 19th century and a north one in 1834. The south aisle and arcade were added in 1838, followed by the clerestorey in 1841.

By the late 19th century, the church was in need of renovation and fundraising began in 1889, led by the rector, Rev. Frederick Broke Howell. Mr. John Thomas Micklethwaite of Westminster drew up the plans and Mr. Samuel Barnes of Broadwey hired as the contractor. The church closed on 16 March 1891 and was reopened by the Bishop of Salisbury, the Right Rev. John Wordsworth, on 10 August 1891. The restoration cost £890 and included general repairs, new flooring, the removal of all three galleries and installation of new pews of English oak.

Once restoration work was completed, further fundraising began towards a new chancel, vestry and organ chamber. The church was also in need of a new organ to replace the existing one of 1685 and the bells required recasting. An organ built by William Sweetland of Bath was added to the church in 1895. By the time of Rev. Howell's death in 1901, approximately £700 had been raised towards an extension of the church. In 1906, his successor, Rev. Canon Gildea, sought the expertise of Messrs Crickmay and Sons of Weymouth on the existing chancel, which was found to be dilapidated and unstable. Plans were drawn up by the architects for a new chancel, along with the desired vestry and organ chamber.

Work began in September 1906 and was carried out by men of the village, under the supervision of Rev. Gildea. The windows and any savable stonework from the old chancel was reused in the new additions, while the 14th-century chancel arch was moved to the east end of the south aisle. The new additions, which cost an approximate £1,000, were dedicated by the Bishop of Salisbury on 24 June 1907. In 1912, the church's four bells were recast and two new ones added.

Upwey, including St Laurence's, suffered flooding damage in July 1955 when rainfall of 7.14 inches fell in 24 hours and swept down into the village. The effects of the flooding can still be seen on the lower part of the pews. An extension of the churchyard was made in 1964 and consecrated on 6 October 1965. In 2008–11, restoration of the church's windows was carried out for an approximate cost of £60,000.

== Architecture ==
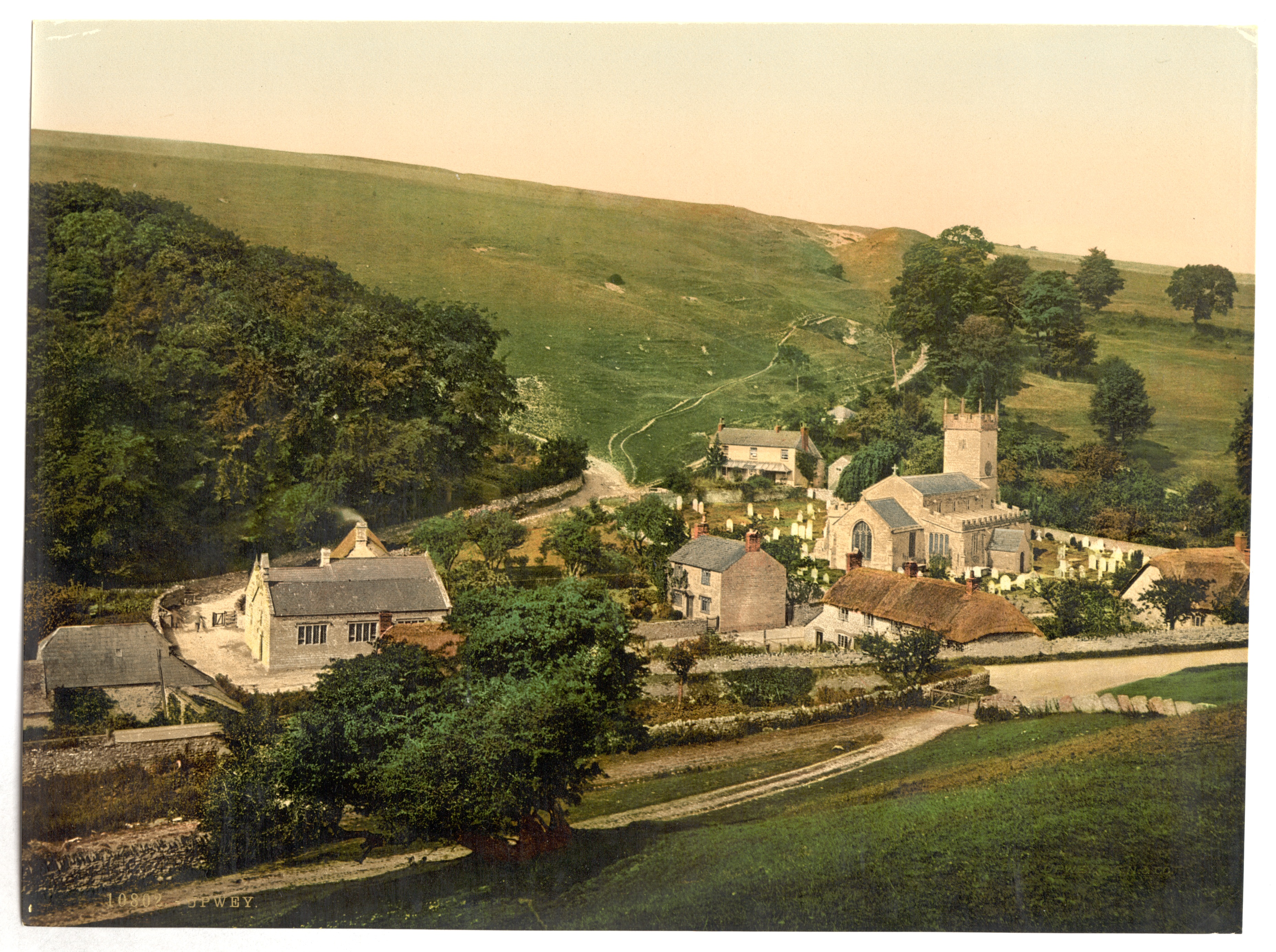
Upwey village, including St Laurence's, in the late 19th-century.

St Laurence's is largely built of Upwey and Portland stone. The roofings are of different materials: the nave of slate, the porch of stone slate, the chancel of tiles, and the aisles and vestry of lead. The church is made up of a four-bay nave, north and south aisles, chancel, west tower, north porch and vestry. The tower clock dates to the early 19th century and was restored in 1912. The church has six bells: two dated 1617, one dated 1767, another dating to the 18th century, and two dating to 1912. Internal fittings include the pews of 1891, a 17th-century seven-sided pulpit on a stone base of 1891 and a 15th-century octagonal stone font (later recut). The chancel's east window, incorporated from the old chancel, contains fragments of 17th-century glass.

== Churchyard ==
In 1997, a number of monuments in the churchyard became Grade II listed:

- Unidentified, 17th century, chest tomb
- Unidentified, 17th century, headstone
- William Gould, 1681, chest tomb with brass tablet
- Robert Freke, 1699, chest tomb
- Mary Freke, 1712, chest tomb
- William Every, 1720, headstone
- Joseph Roper, 1770, headstone
- Tregunel Roper, 1817, headstone
- John Roper, 1858, headstone
