= Weymouth and Melcombe Regis =

Weymouth and Melcombe Regis could refer to:

- Municipal Borough of Weymouth and Melcombe Regis
- Weymouth and Melcombe Regis (UK Parliament constituency)
