= St Ann's Church, Radipole =

Church in Dorset, England

St Ann's Church
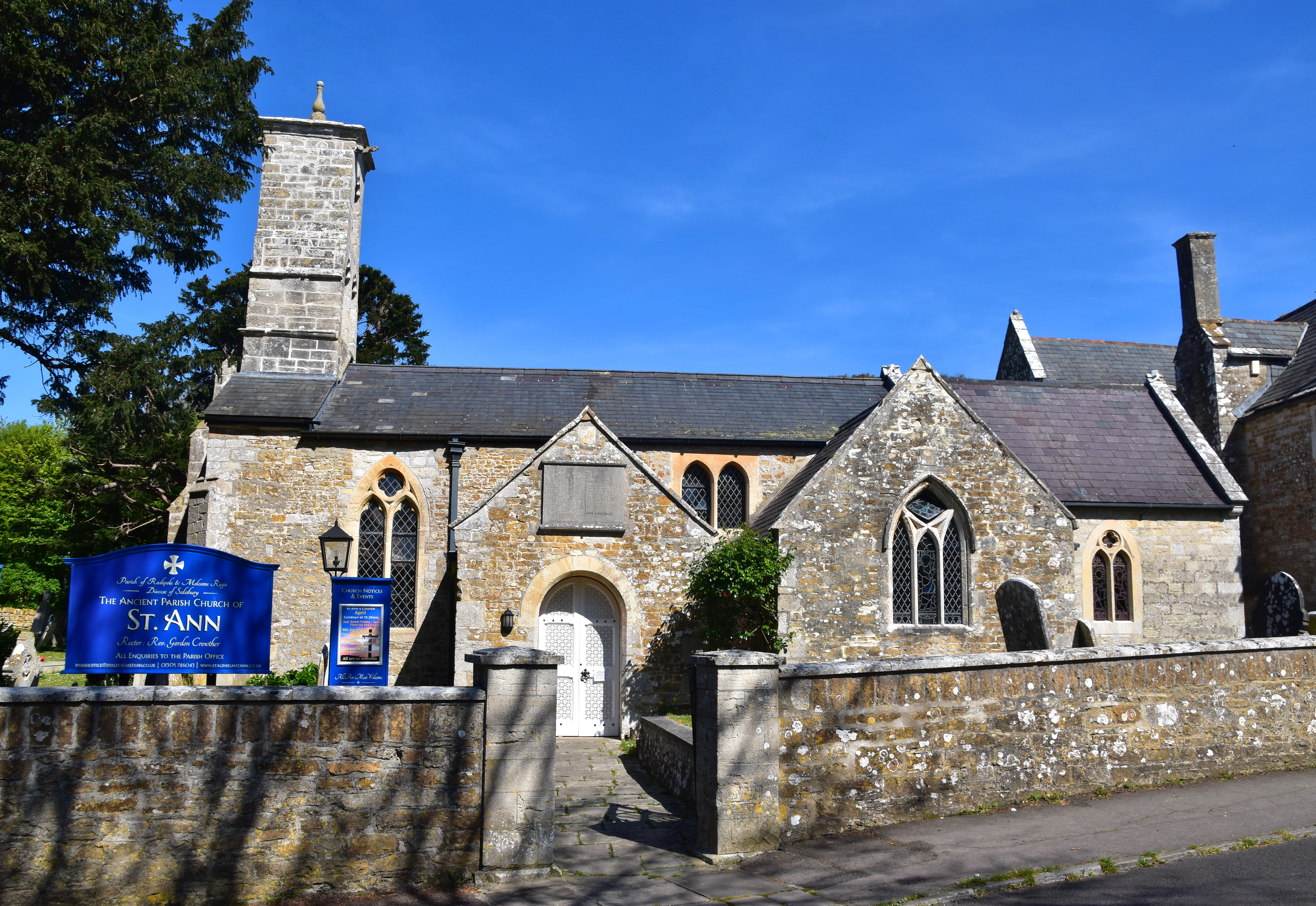

Religion
- Affiliation: Church of England
- Ecclesiastical or organizational status: Active

Location
- Location: Radipole, Weymouth, Dorset, England
- Interactive map of St Ann's Church
- Coordinates: 50.6310°N 2.4718°W

Architecture
- Type: Church

St Ann's Church is a Church of England parish church in Radipole, Weymouth, Dorset, England. The church dates to the 13th century, with later additions, and is a Grade II* listed building. Both the boundary wall of the churchyard and church room opposite are also Grade II listed.

== History ==
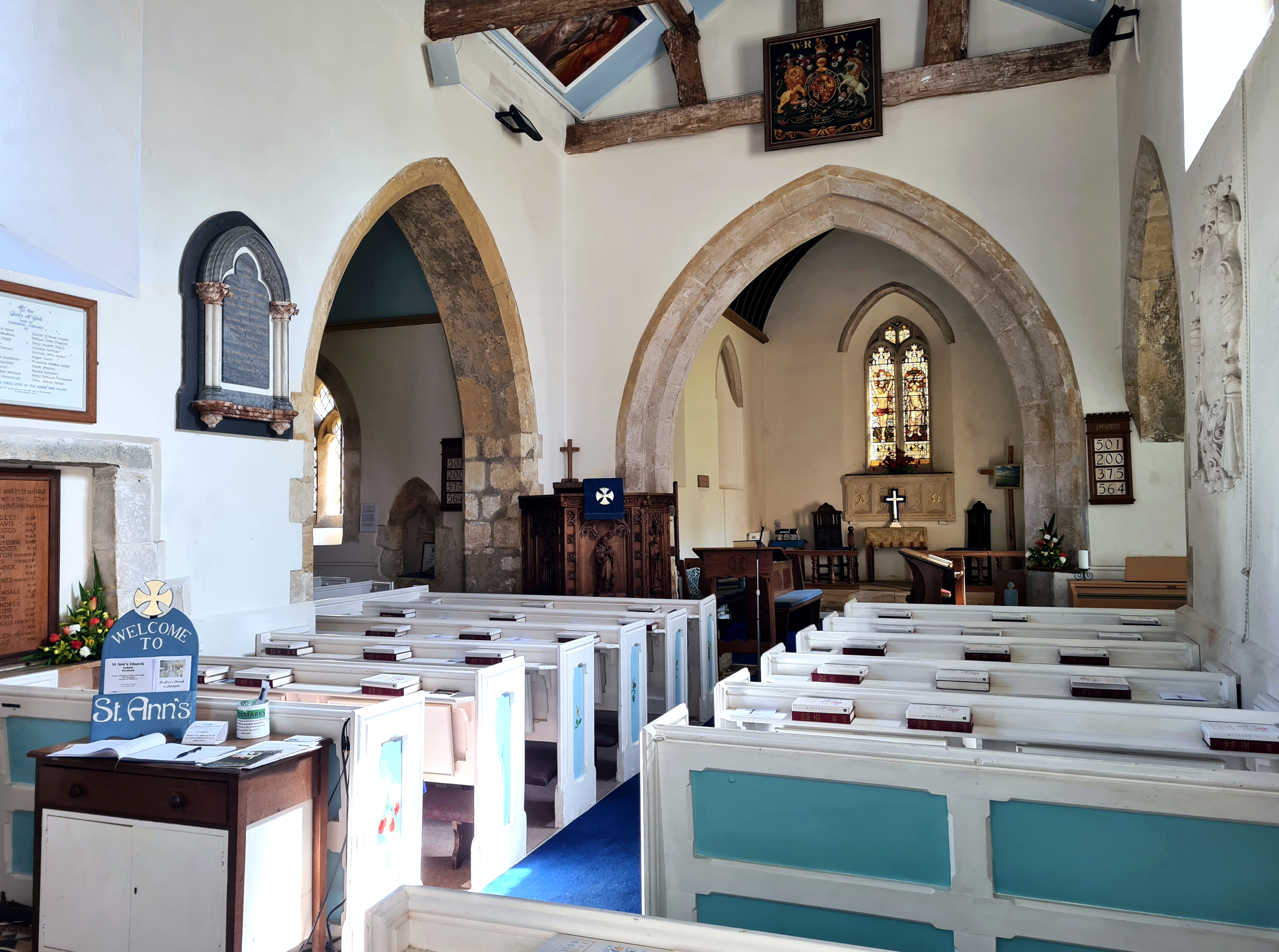
The interior of St Ann's Church.

St Ann's was originally dedicated to St Mary and served as the parish church of Melcombe Regis. The existing church dates to the 13th century, but it is believed that an older church occupied the site, owing to the discovery of encaustic tiles when the church's flooring was replaced in the 1863 restoration. Much of the existing nave dates to the 13th century, at which time the main body of the church was made up of nave and chancel only. North and south chapels were added in the 14th century and the chancel was rebuilt and enlarged during the same century. The west end of the nave was rebuilt in the early 16th century which included the replacement of a small tower with a bell-turret. The south porch was rebuilt in 1733 and the south chapel rebuilt in 1735.

In 1605, a new church dedicated to St Mary's was built on a more centralised site near Melcombe Regis' harbourside. It became the new parish church the following year, leaving St Ann's as a chapel of ease. The decision to build a new church stemmed from the Radipole church being too small and at an inconvenient location for many parishioners. Furthermore, it was considered that Melcombe Regis was "subject to the incursion of foreign enemies, who might surprise the town during Divine service, and depart before the inhabitants could repair home to make resistance".

St Mary's at Radipole was rededicated to St Ann during the 19th century. It underwent internal restoration and reseating for £400 in 1863. The plans were drawn up by Mr. G. R. Crickmay of Weymouth and the work carried out by Mr. R. Reynolds of Weymouth, under the supervision of the architect. The work included repairing the walls, replacing the pews with new ones of stained and varnished deal, laying new flooring and replacing the church's gallery. The two small windows on the west side of the porch were replaced by a larger, single one, the timbers of the nave's roof were restored, and new timber roofs added in the porch and south transept. New fittings were also added to the church, including a pulpit fixed on a pedestal of Portland stone, an octagonal font of Portland stone, a reading desk and communion rail. The church reopened on 23 December 1863.

Further restoration was carried out in 1882 and its completion marked by a ceremony on 16 June 1882. The external walls and roof of the church were extensively repaired, the interior cleaned and recoloured, and some new fittings added. St Ann's became a parish church again in 1926 when Radipole and Melcombe Regis were split into separate parishes. A daughter church, St Aldhelm's, was built in 1939–41 to serve the growing population of Radipole. The vestry of St Ann's was rebuilt in 1960, with its doorway incorporating stonework from a 17th-century house in Weymouth which was demolished the previous year.

== Architecture ==
St Ann's is built of ashlar and rubble stone with slate roofs. It is made up of a five-bay nave, chancel, north and south chapels, south porch and vestry. The west side contains a two-stage bell-turret. Above the chancel arch are the Royal Arms of William IV. In the south porch is the church's original 13th-century font. It was originally square but later recut in the 16th century to form a rounded front. Other fittings include a late 19th-century stone reredos and a carved oak pulpit of 1902.

The church room opposite St Ann's was built as a schoolroom in 1850 on a plot of land donated by William Eliot. It became Grade II listed in 1974.

== Churchyard ==
In 1997, a number of monuments in the churchyard became Grade II listed:

- Edward and Mary Bealle, 1694, headstone
- William Moulam, 1737, headstone
- Sarah, wife of John Moulam, 1749, headstone
- Archibald Grant, 1805, chest tomb
- Joseph Swafield Thorne, 1846, chest tomb
