= Radipole Lake =

Lake in Dorset, England

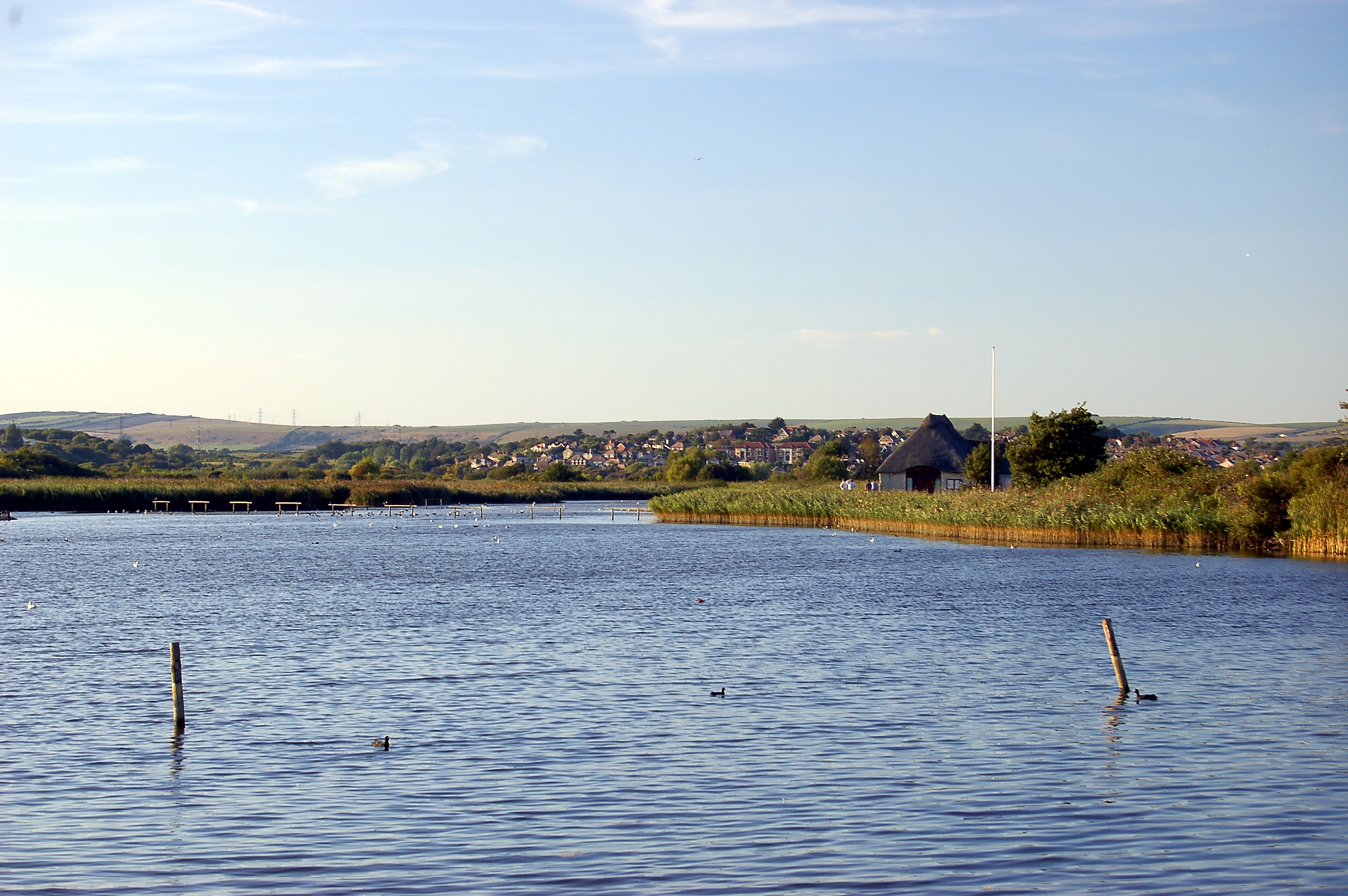
- The lake, viewed from the A353 road bridge, looking towards the visitor centre.

- Location within Dorset
- Location: Weymouth, Dorset
- Coordinates: 50°37′31″N 2°28′1″W
- Basin countries: United Kingdom

Radipole Lake is a lake on the River Wey, now in the English coastal town of Weymouth, Dorset, once in Radipole, the village and parish of the same name. Along the western shore of the lake, and between Radipole and the town centre of Weymouth, now lies the modern suburb of Southill.

The lake is a nature reserve run by the Royal Society for the Protection of Birds, as it is an important habitat for reedbed birds. The Wild Weymouth Discovery Centre at Radipole Lake features nature and bird exhibits and programs, trails and viewing blinds.

Radipole Lake is designated as a Site of Special Scientific Interest and part of the geographical area covered by this designation is owned by the Royal Society for the Protection of Birds.

The lake flows into Weymouth Harbour.

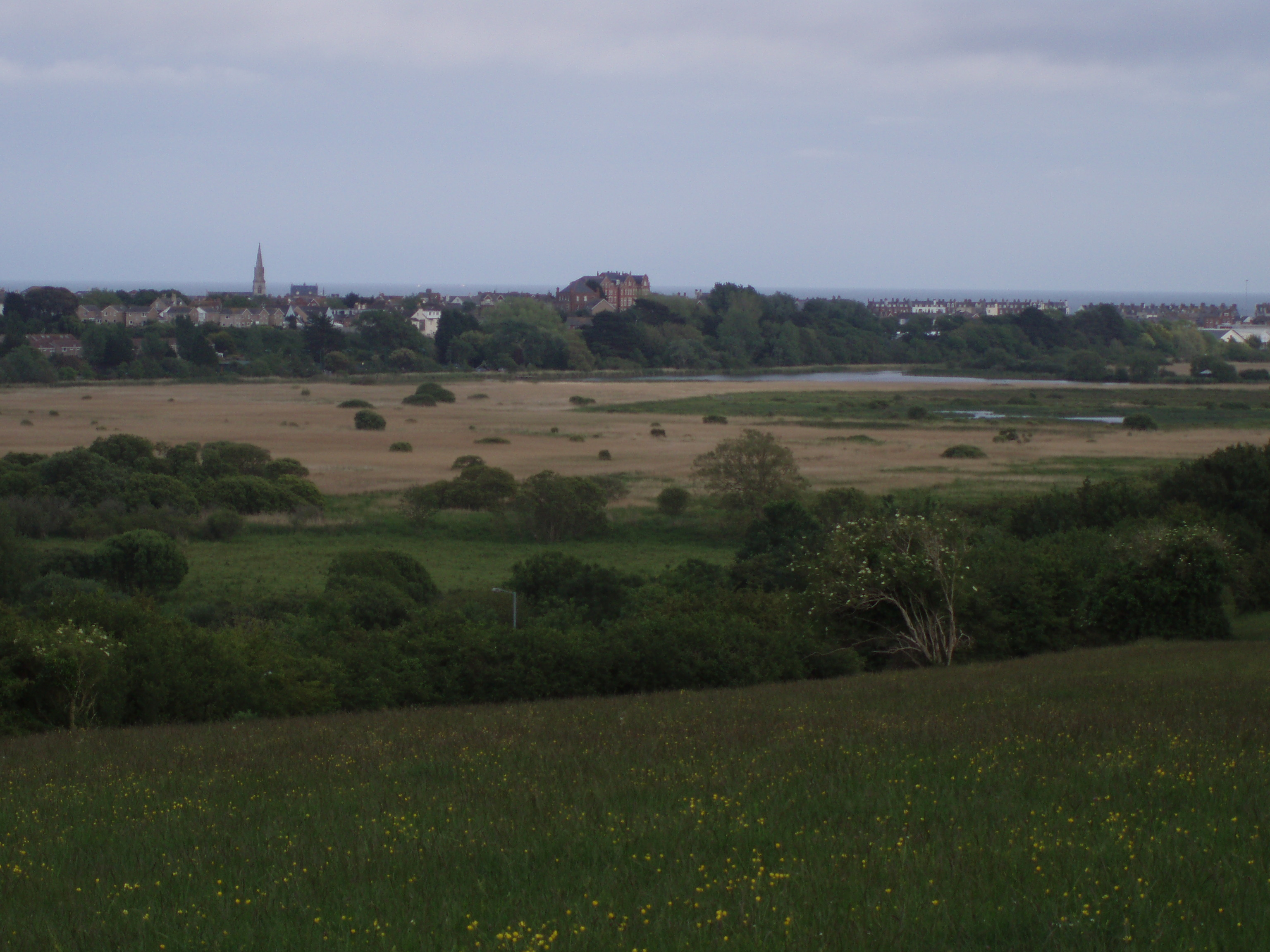
Radipole Lake viewed from Southill. Weymouth town centre can be seen in the distance.
