= Upwey, Dorset =

Suburb of Weymouth, Dorset, England

Coordinates: 50°40′N 2°29′W

Upwey
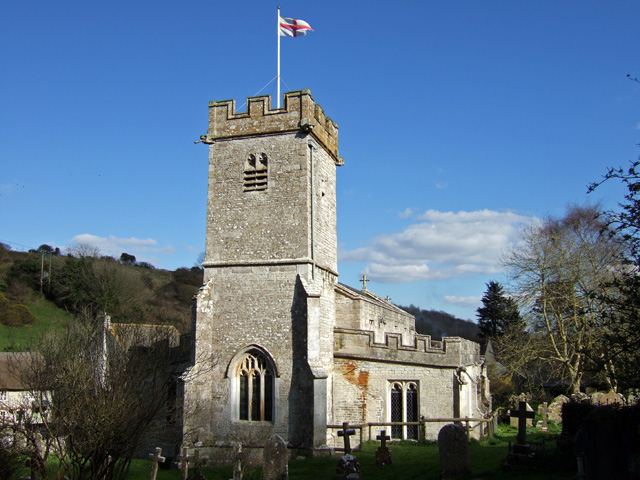
- St Laurence's Church

- Location within Dorset
- Civil parish: Weymouth
- Unitary authority: Dorset
- Ceremonial county: Dorset
- Region: South West
- Country: England
- Sovereign state: United Kingdom
- Post town: Weymouth
- Postcode district: DT3
- Dialling code: 01305

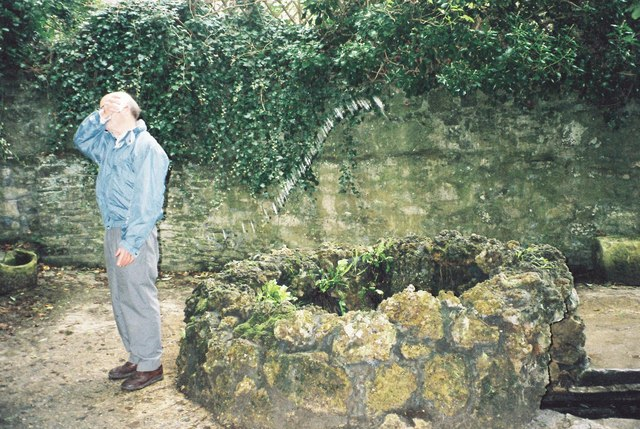
Upwey wishing well

Upwey is a suburb of Weymouth in south Dorset, England. The suburb is situated on the B3159 road in the Wey valley. The area was formerly a village until it was absorbed into the Weymouth built-up area. It is located four miles north of the town centre in the outer suburbs. In the Census 2001 the combined population of Upwey and neighbouring Broadwey was 4,349.

The village has a 13th-century parish church, dedicated to Saint Laurence, and a manor house, Upwey Manor, a Grade II* listed building dated to 1639, which was owned by the Gould family. A disc barrow is located above the village on the Ridgeway at map reference SY 663866. The former United Reformed Church was built in 1880–81 and closed in 1992.

The River Wey rises at the foot of the chalk ridge of the South Dorset Downs, which rise above Upwey to the north, and flows through the village. The source is known as the Upwey wishing well and was a tourist attraction as far back as the Victorian era. There is now a tea room at the site, complete with mature water gardens. In the 18th century a water mill was built on the river, rebuilt in 1802, it featured in Thomas Hardy's The Trumpet Major. The mill is now Grade II* listed. Hardy also wrote a poem "At the Railway Station, Upway", which most likely relates to Upwey station.

Upwey features in Edward Chaney's Genius Friend: G.B. Edwards and The Book of Ebenezer le Page as the place in which Chaney got to know Gerald Edwards and encouraged him to complete his novel. Edwards died in the since-demolished 654 Dorchester Road, Upwey, on 29 December 1976.

Upwey has two public houses. The Old Ship features in Thomas Hardy's Under the Greenwood Tree, while The Royal Standard was once run by an aunt of Thomas Hardy on his father's side.

Upwey lends its name to Upwey, Victoria, in Melbourne, near Belgrave, Victoria.

== Politics ==
Upwey is part of the South Dorset parliamentary constituency.

Upwey is part of the Upwey and Broadwey ward for elections to Dorset Council.

In 1931 the civil parish had a population of 910. On 1 April 1933 the parish was abolished and merged with Weymouth, Bincombe and Poxwell.
