= River Wey, Dorset =

River in Dorset, England

River Wey
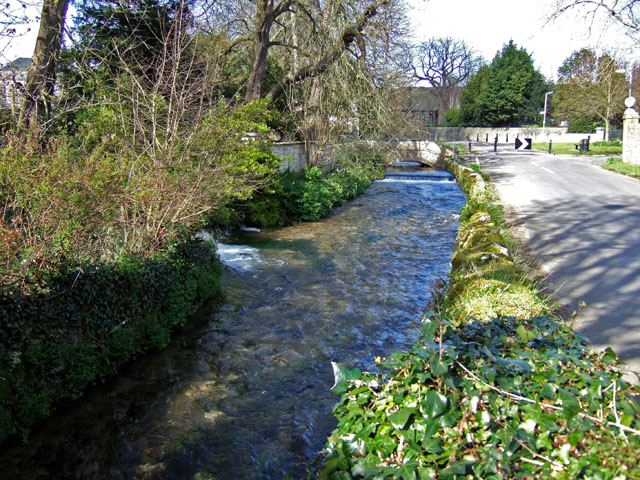
- The Wey at Upwey

- Location within Dorset

Location
- Country: England
- County: Dorset

Physical characteristics
- Source
  - location: Upwey
  - coordinates: 50.6667°N 2.4833°W
- Mouth
  - location: Weymouth Harbour
  - coordinates: 50.6118°N 2.4576°W
- Length: 12 km (7.5 mi)

The River Wey is a chalk stream flowing through Dorset in south west England.

== Course ==
The river is about 12 kilometres (7.5 mi) long. It rises in Upwey, where the spring forms Upwey Wishing Well, at the foot of the South Dorset Downs, a ridge of chalk hills that separate Weymouth from Dorchester. Most of the course is in the built-up area of Weymouth, running through the former villages (now suburbs) of Upwey, Broadwey, Nottington, and Radipole, through Radipole Lake and into Weymouth Harbour. From source to mouth it falls around 60 metres (200 ft).

== History ==
The river has been important since Roman times, when Radipole Lake was used as a reservoir. The town of Weymouth was established by two harbour villages (Weymouth itself and Melcombe Regis) either side of the mouth. The river was important for milling during the 18th and 19th centuries, when there were five water mills based along it. All five of the millers needed carefully to co-ordinate their activities to ensure a reliable flow of water.

The source is an important water supply. There is a large pumping station at Friar Waddon, drawing from the source of the Wey, which is the main water supply for the Isle of Portland. Wessex Water is licensed to pump 14 megalitres (3,100,000 imp gal) per day.

== Environment ==
The river is important for wildlife; Radipole Lake is a national nature reserve run by the Royal Society for the Protection of Birds. It has been a Site of Special Scientific Interest since 1979. The spring water of the Wey is used by the Upwey fish farm, which also uses the river to grow watercress. All water in the farm is recycled back to the river.

== See also ==
- List of rivers of England
