= Radipole =

Suburb of Weymouth, England

Coordinates: 50°37′N 2°28′W

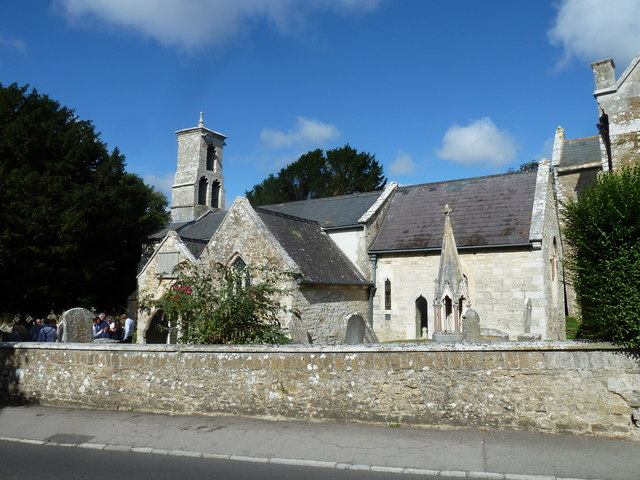

- Location within Dorset
- Civil parish: Weymouth
- Unitary authority: Dorset
- Ceremonial county: Dorset
- Region: South West
- Country: England
- Sovereign state: United Kingdom
- Post town: WEYMOUTH
- Postcode district: DT3, DT4
- Dialling code: 01305

Radipole /ˈrædɪpoʊl/ is a suburb of Weymouth in Dorset, England.

== History ==
In 1931 the civil parish had a population of 340. On 1 April 1933 the parish was abolished and merged with Weymouth and Chickerell. It remains a separate ecclesiastical parish. Radipole stands at the head of, and is named after, the lake, now an RSPB nature reserve, into which the River Wey flows, and which leads into Weymouth Harbour. Until 1984, it had Radipole Halt railway station on the South West Main Line and Heart of Wessex Line out of Weymouth.

There is some evidence of prehistoric occupation, and it is believed that the Romans had a small port or landing stage at the head of the lake. A Romano-British burial site was found nearby when the upper playing field of Southill Primary School was constructed. A Roman road runs from Radipole to Dorchester (the former Durnovaria), and indeed still forms by far the greater part of the line of the present road between Weymouth and Dorchester.

The parish of Radipole predates by centuries the borough of Melcombe Regis, which grew up on its wastes on an exposed spit of shingle by the sea in the 12th century. The church of St Ann was the mother church of Melcombe Regis until 1606. The church is distinguished for its triple bellcote, consisting of a single arch above double arches. A daughter church, St Aldhelm's, was built in 1939–41.

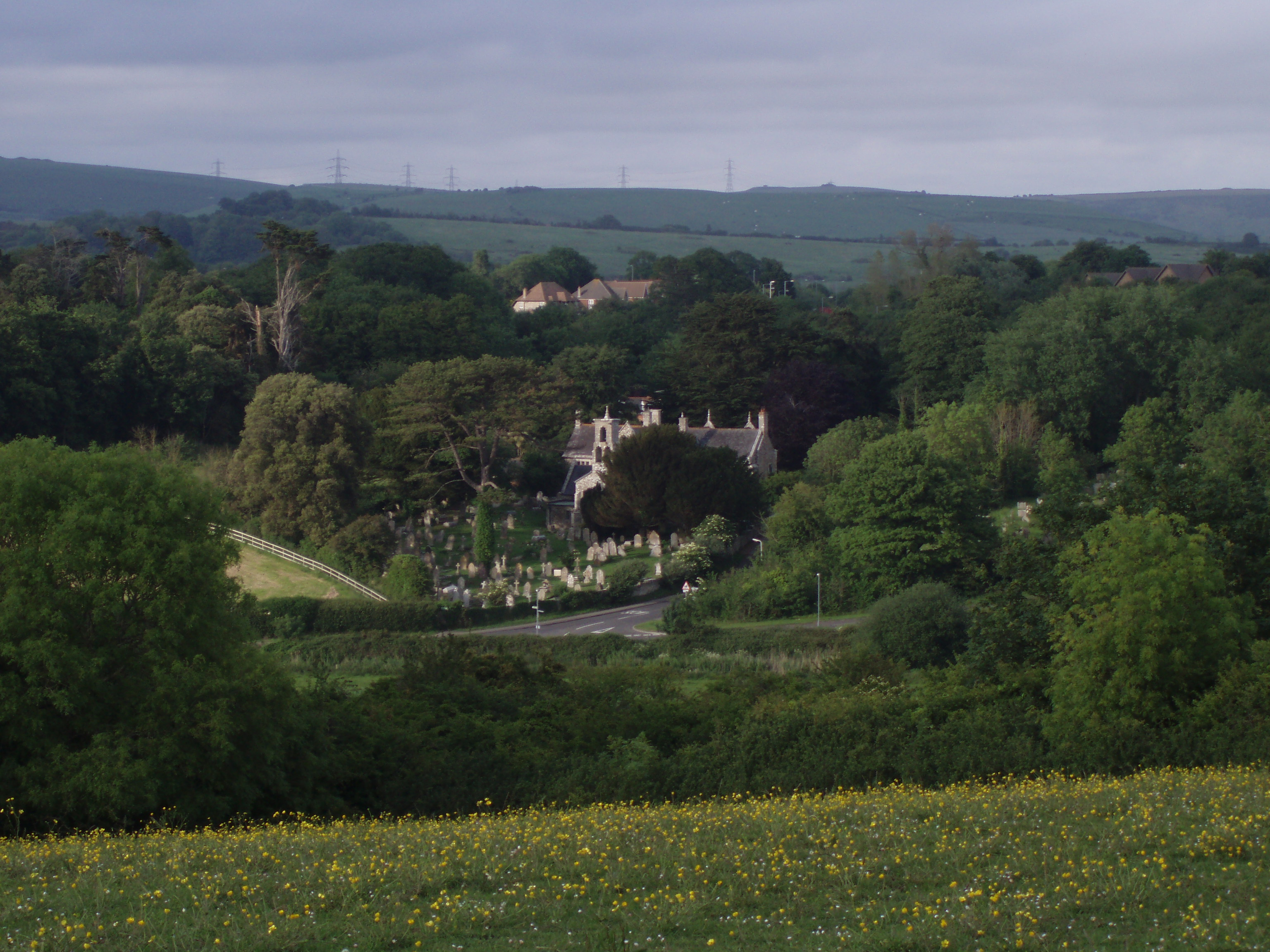
The graveyard and the distinctive belfry of St Ann's Church, Radipole, as seen from nearby Southill. The old Manor House lies behind the church.

In the last decades, Radipole has experienced suburbanisation and accompanying road-building, as nearby Weymouth has expanded northwards. However, the centre of the old village still remains. The attractive architectural group formed by the church and the manor house is well known locally. The field known as Humpty-Dumpty Field immediately to the south of the churchyard, on the slope leading down to the head of the lake, is supposed once to have covered the site of the lost mediaeval village, and possibly even Roman remains, but any such evidence was destroyed by the action of the then landowner.

Radipole was a part of the district of Weymouth and Portland until the creation of the unitary Dorset Council in 2019. It makes up the Radipole ward which elects two councillors to the council.
