= Municipal Borough of Weymouth and Melcombe Regis =

Former local government area in the UK

Coordinates: 50.611°N 2.453°W

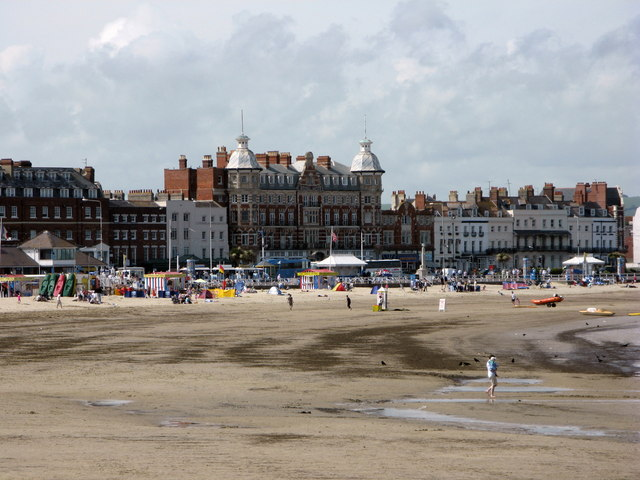
The Royal Hotel on the Esplanade, Melcombe Regis

Weymouth and Melcombe Regis was a borough in England. It was formed by a charter of Elizabeth I, amalgamating the towns of Weymouth and Melcombe Regis in 1571.

== Parliamentary representation ==
The towns continued to send the same number of MPs to the unreformed House of Commons as they had before the merger - two for each. The borough was stripped of its double representation by the Reform Act 1832, which reduced it to two seats, and then was remodelled by the Municipal Reform Act 1835. It ceased to be a parliamentary borough from 1885. Since then, the area covered by the borough has formed part of the South Dorset constituency.

== After 1885 ==
The borough continued in existence, as a municipal borough until 1974, when it was merged, under the Local Government Act 1972, into the district of Weymouth and Portland.
