= Southill, Weymouth =

Suburb of Weymouth, Dorset, England

Coordinates: 50.624°N 2.478°W

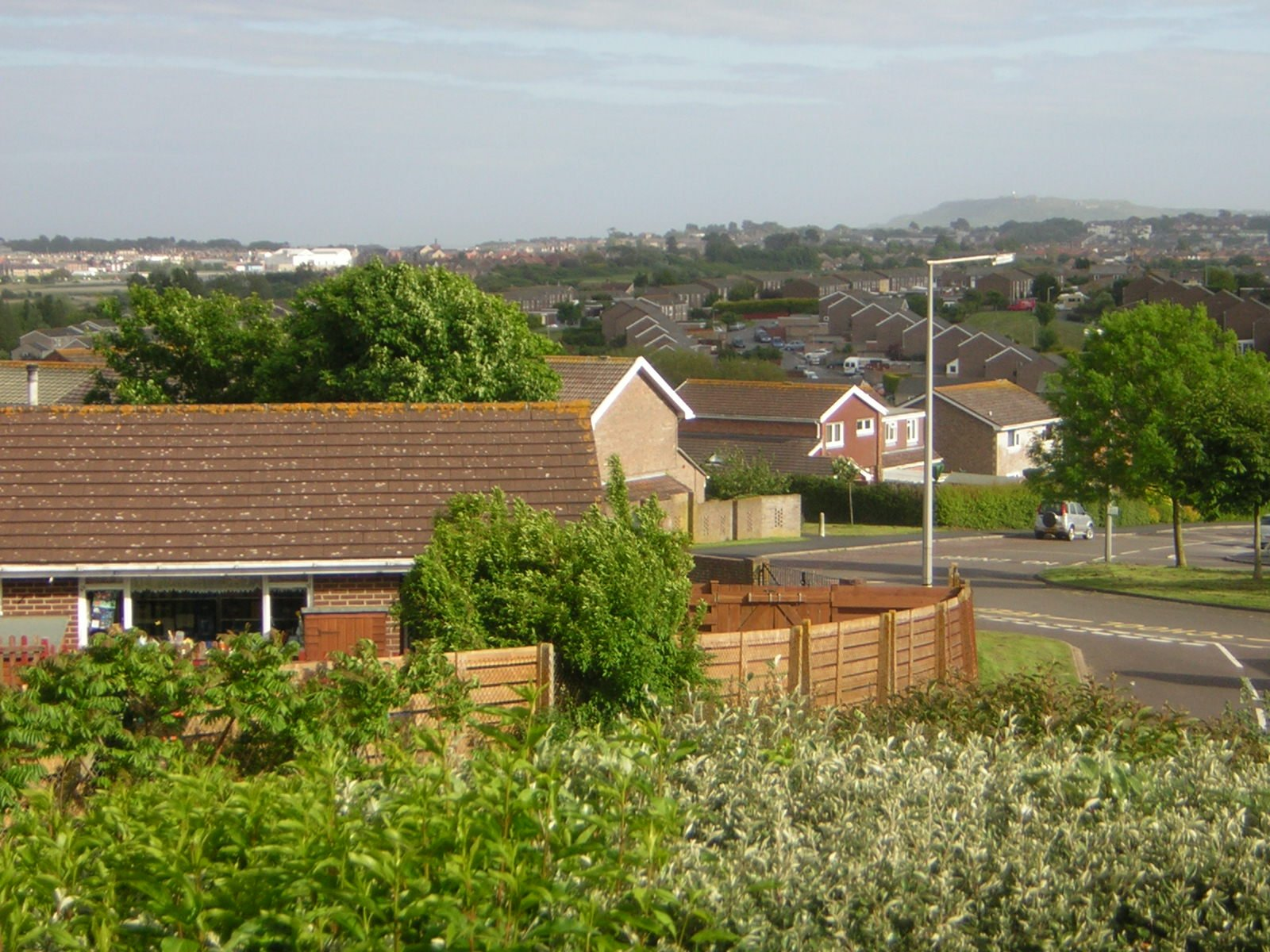
A view over Radipole Lake towards Weymouth town centre (on the left) and Portland (on the right) from Southill. In the foreground is the original caretaker's bungalow of the primary school.

Southill, Weymouth is a modern suburb of Weymouth, Dorset, England, and lies about 2 miles (3 km) north of the town centre. It was developed on the western shore of Radipole Lake in several phases from the 1960s onwards.

At its centre lay a post office, confusingly and wrongly named South Hill Post Office, but this closed in January 2007. There is a small shopping centre, a community centre, a church and a pub, the John Gregory. A primary school was built to serve the new estate in the 1970s.

Southill is part of the parish of Radipole, the hill itself coming between Radipole and Weymouth.

== Transportation ==
Southill was without a bus service between 2013 and 2023, when First withdrew the number 5 service due to budget cuts. In 2023, route number 3 (Westham - Town Centre) was re-routed to make five trips through Southill on weekdays.
