= Weymouth, Dorset =

Town in Dorset, England

Coordinates: 50°36′35″N 02°27′17″W

Weymouth
- Town and civil parish
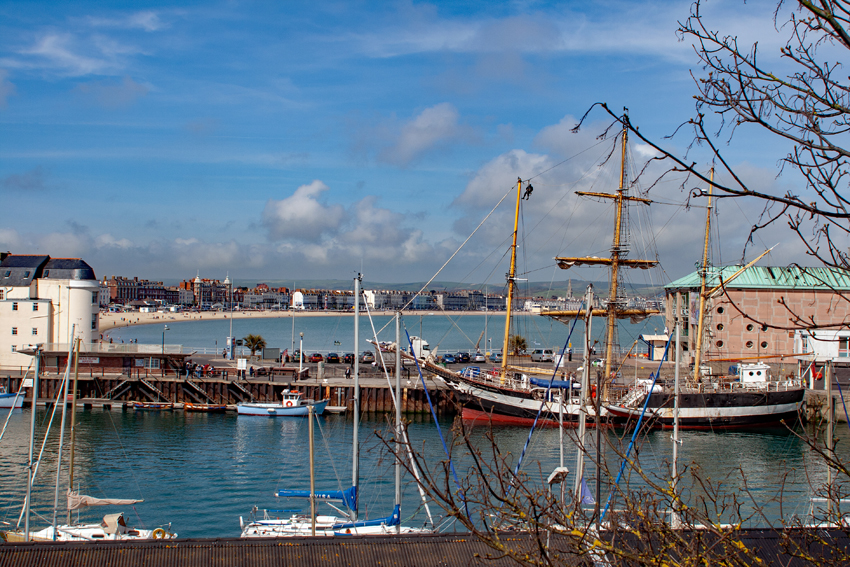
- Weymouth harbour and bay

- Coat of arms of Weymouth, granted 1592

- Location within Dorset
- Population: 53,416 (2021)
- OS grid reference: SY6779
  - London: 121 miles (195 km) ENE
- Civil parish: Weymouth
- Unitary authority: Dorset
- Ceremonial county: Dorset
- Region: South West
- Country: England
- Sovereign state: United Kingdom
- Post town: WEYMOUTH
- Postcode district: DT3, DT4
- Dialling code: 01305
- Police: Dorset
- Fire: Dorset and Wiltshire
- Ambulance: South Western
- UK Parliament: South Dorset

Weymouth (/ˈweɪməθ/ WAY-məth) is a seaside town and civil parish in the Dorset district, in the ceremonial county of Dorset, England. Situated on a sheltered bay at the mouth of the River Wey, 7 miles (11 km) south of the county town of Dorchester, Weymouth had a population of 53,416 in 2021. It is the third-largest settlement in Dorset after Bournemouth and Poole.

The history of the town stretches back to the 12th century and includes roles in the spread of the Black Death, the settlement of the Americas and the development of Georgian architecture. It was a major departure point for the Normandy Landings during World War II.

A seaside resort, Weymouth and its economy depend on tourism. Visitors are attracted by its harbour and position, approximately halfway along the Jurassic Coast, a World Heritage Site, important for its geology and landforms. Once a port for cross-channel ferries, Weymouth Harbour is now home to a commercial fishing fleet, pleasure boats and private yachts, while nearby Portland Harbour is the location of the Weymouth and Portland National Sailing Academy, where the sailing events of the 2012 Olympic Games and Paralympic Games were held.

== History ==
=== Early days ===
The modern town of Weymouth originated as the two settlements of Weymouth and Melcombe Regis, on opposite sides of Weymouth Harbour in Dorset. The older of the two, on the south side, was referred to as Weymouth as early as the 10th century, as part of the parish of Wyke Regis, and by 1252 had become a chartered borough and established seaport, trading in imported wine. Melcombe Regis, on the north side, was first noted in the 11th century. It developed separately from the mid 12th century onwards and in 1310 was a licensed wool port. However, French raiders found the port so accessible that in 1433 the staple was transferred to Poole. Melcombe Regis is thought to be the first port at which the Black Death came into England in June or July 1348, possibly aboard either a spice ship or an army ship from Calais, where fighting was taking place in the Hundred Years' War.

In their early history, the two towns were rivals for trade and industry, and many arguments broke out over use of the harbour. In 1571, Queen Elizabeth I became so tired of the petitioning that she united the two towns in an Act of Parliament, to form a double borough of Weymouth and Melcombe Regis. Both towns have become known as Weymouth, despite Melcombe Regis being the main centre. The villages of Upwey, Broadwey, Preston, Wyke Regis, Chickerell, Southill, Radipole and Littlemoor have since become part of the built-up area.

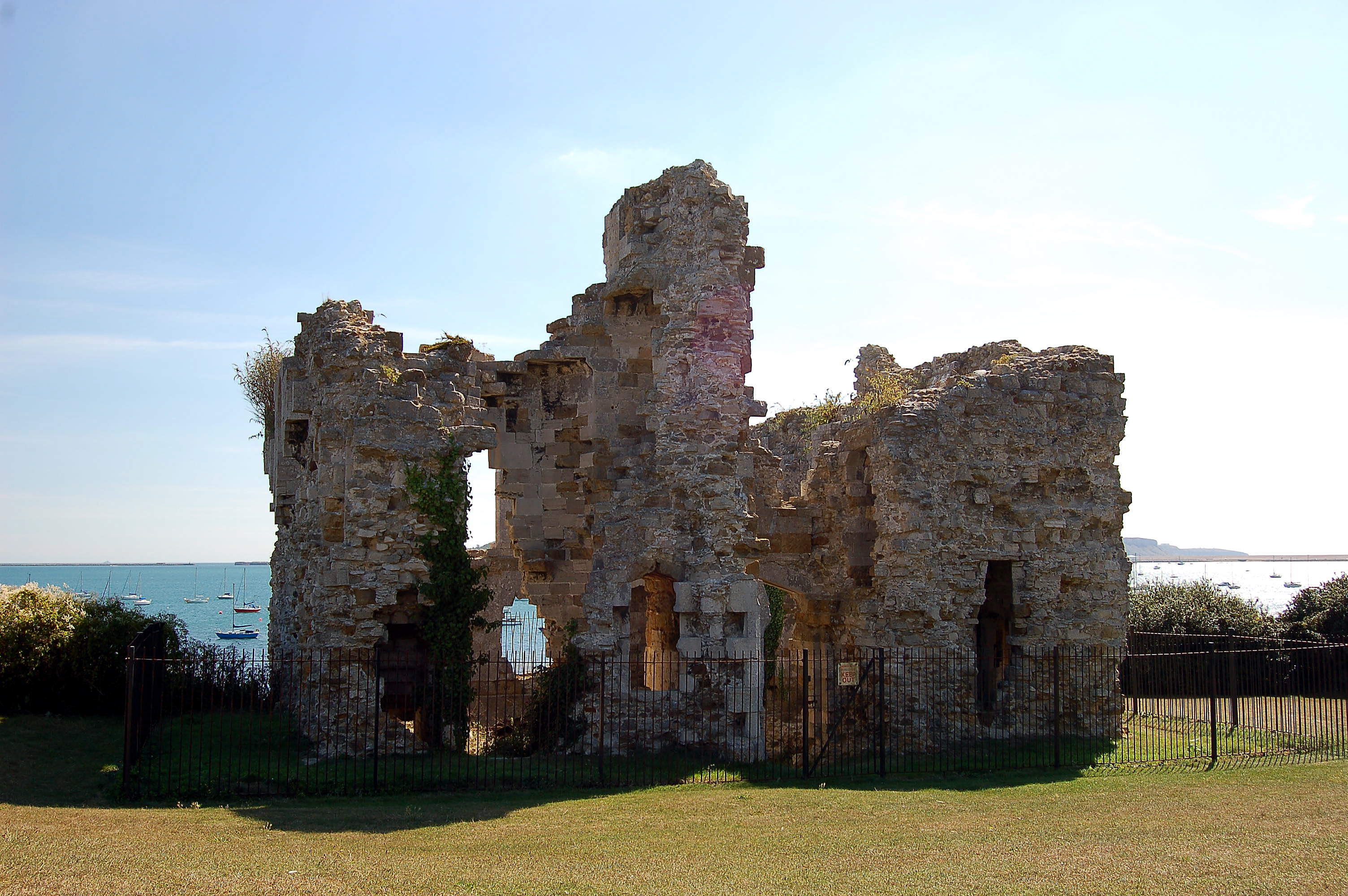
The ruins of the 16th-century Sandsfoot Castle

Henry VIII had two Device Forts built to protect the south Dorset coast from invasion in the 1530s: Sandsfoot Castle in Wyke Regis and Portland Castle in Castletown. Coastal erosion forced the abandonment of Sandsfoot as early as 1665 and parts have since fallen into the sea. In 1635, around 100 emigrants from the town crossed the Atlantic Ocean on board the ship Charity and settled in Weymouth, Massachusetts. More townspeople emigrated to the Americas to bolster the population of Weymouth, Nova Scotia and Salem, Massachusetts, then called Naumking.

=== Civil war ===
During the English Civil War, control of Weymouth changed a number of times and the town was much damaged as a result. When conflict first broke out in 1642, Weymouth was peacefully occupied by Parliamentarians, but it was captured in August the following year by 2,000 Royalist cavalry and held until June 1644, when it was retaken. Around 250 people were killed in the local Crabchurch Conspiracy when sympathetic residents let Royalist soldiers into the town in February 1645. It was recaptured later that month and remained in Parliamentarian hands for the remainder of the war, despite enduring a protracted siege.

=== George III ===
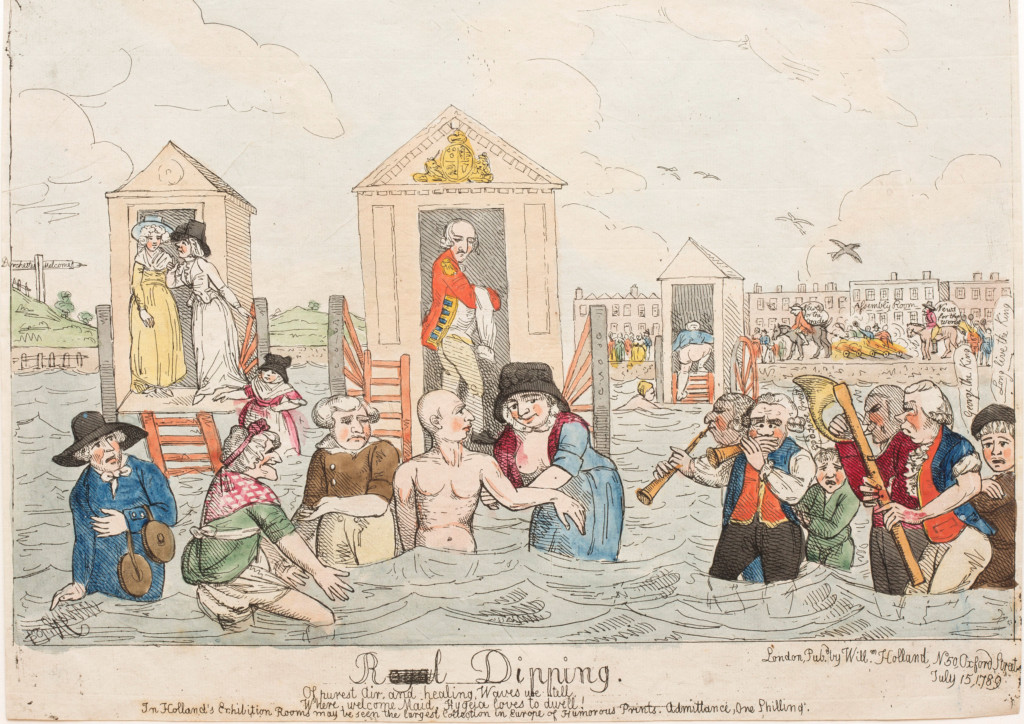
George III bathing at Weymouth by John Colley Nixon, 1789

The resort is among the first modern tourist destinations, after one of King George III's brothers, the Duke of Gloucester, built a country house named Gloucester Lodge there; the Duke spent the winter of 1780 at the house. George III made Weymouth his summer holiday residence on fourteen occasions between 1789 and 1805, even venturing into the sea in a bathing machine.

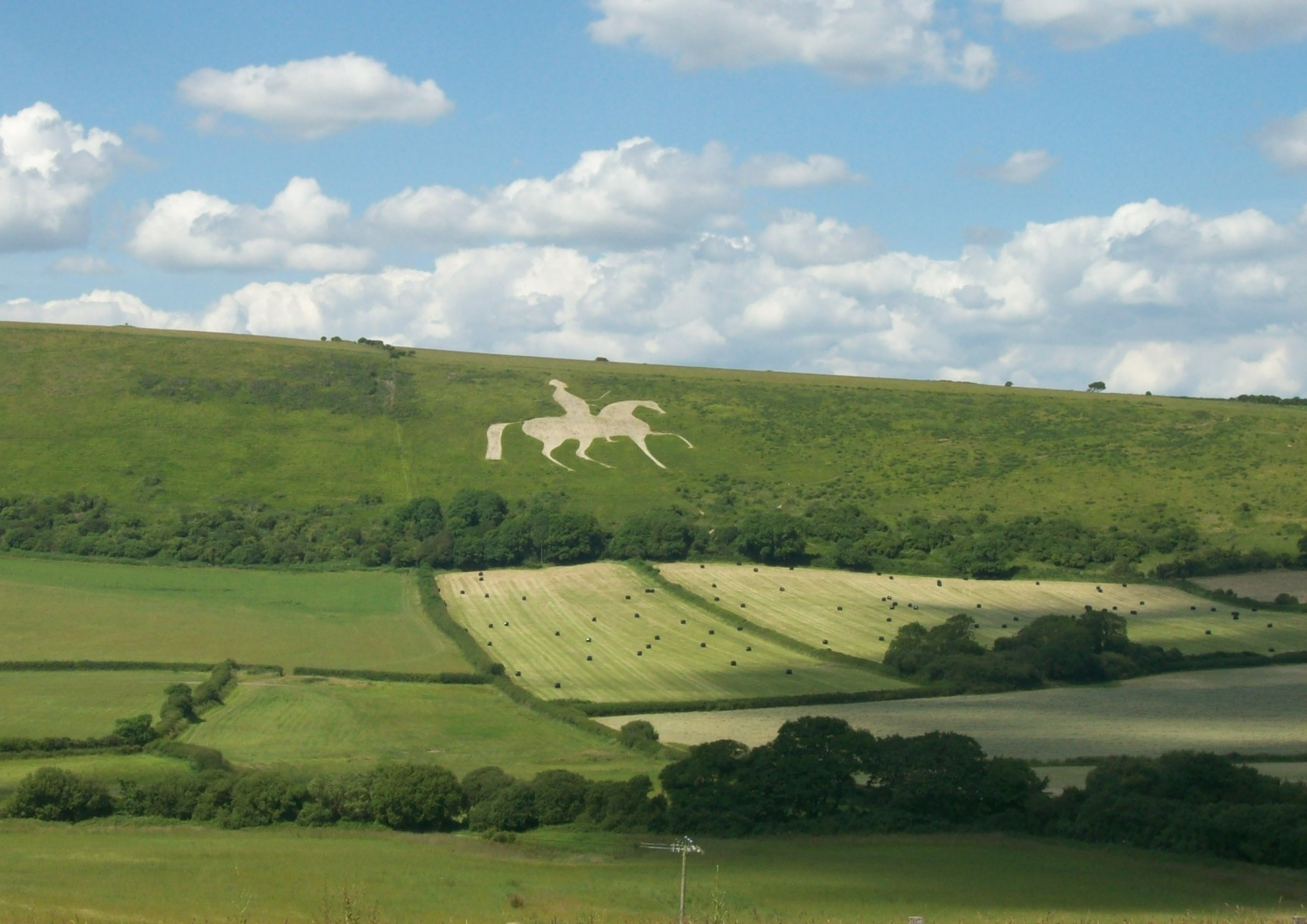
The White Horse at Osmington shows King George III on a horse

In celebration of the king's patronage, in 1810, a painted statue was placed on the seafront. Known simply as the King's Statue, it was extensively renovated in 2007–08. A second tribute to George III, completed two years earlier in 1808, is the mounted white horse at Osmington. Designed by local architect James Hamilton, and cut into the chalk hillside by soldiers under his direction, the figure measures 280 ft (85 m) long by 323 ft (98 m) high.

During the French Revolutionary and Napoleonic Wars, Weymouth started to gain some military importance: in 1795, the Red Barracks were constructed for cavalry troops stationed at Nothe. They were badly damaged in 1798 by a fire and work started on new buildings and a parade ground at Radipole. These premises could house 953 officers and men together with 986 horses. The Red Barracks were rebuilt in 1801 and given over to infantry.

=== Victorian era ===
Militarisation of the town continued through the Victorian era, with work starting on Portland Harbour in 1849. Built specifically to accommodate the new steam navy, the project was completed in 1872. Between 1860 and 1872, Nothe Fort was constructed at the entrance of Weymouth Harbour, overlooking the new harbour at Portland.

Weymouth's popularity, both as a trading port and as a holiday destination, also grew in this period and the arrival of the railway in 1857 boosted both industries. The Royal National Lifeboat Institution stationed a lifeboat at Weymouth for the first time on 26 January 1869. A boathouse was built with a slipway by the harbour and is still in use, although the lifeboat is now moored at a pontoon. In 1887, to mark the 50th year of Queen Victoria's reign, a multi-coloured Jubilee Clock was erected on the esplanade.

=== Modern times ===
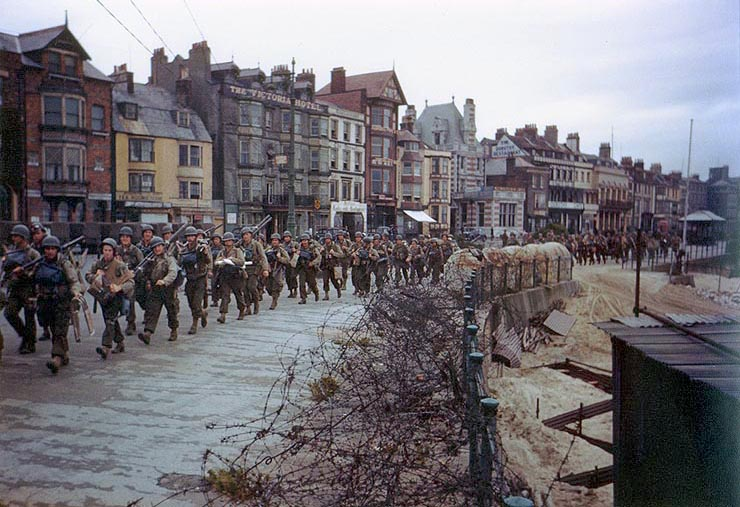
US soldiers march along Esplanade through Weymouth to board landing ships for the 1944 invasion of France.

During World War I, about 120,000 Australian and New Zealand Army Corps personnel convalesced in Weymouth after being injured at Gallipoli or other theatres of the war; the existing army camps and mild climate made it an ideal location. Most of the soldiers were repatriated in 1919; some stayed and married local women.

Weymouth's military importance made it a target for German bombing during World War II. The air raids destroyed 1,200 civilian dwellings and killed 76 civilians, and the High Street was so badly damaged that much of it had to be demolished after the war. In September 1942 the first full-scale testing of the bouncing bomb was carried out west of the town, on the lagoon behind Chesil Bank. Tens of thousands of Allied troops departed Weymouth and Portland for D-Day, bound for Omaha in Normandy. By the time the conflict in Europe had ended, 517,816 troops and 144,903 vehicles had been through the ports.

The immediate aftermath of the war was a difficult time for Weymouth which, in common with other seaside resorts, was not seen as a priority for government investment. In 1960, Southampton stopped services to the Channel Islands, leaving Weymouth as the UK's major link with the islands. A linkspan constructed in 1972 and the introduction of a passenger service to Cherbourg in 1974 helped to further revive the town's fortunes. During the 1970s, cheap package holidays abroad caused a reduction in the town's tourist trade, and harbour trade also suffered a decline; but the number of ferry passengers continued to rise and in 1980 a new terminal with improved facilities was built. From 1990, the demand for bigger vessels forced the cross-channel ferry operators to transfer to larger ports, such as Poole; the last ferry left Weymouth in 2015.

== Governance and politics ==
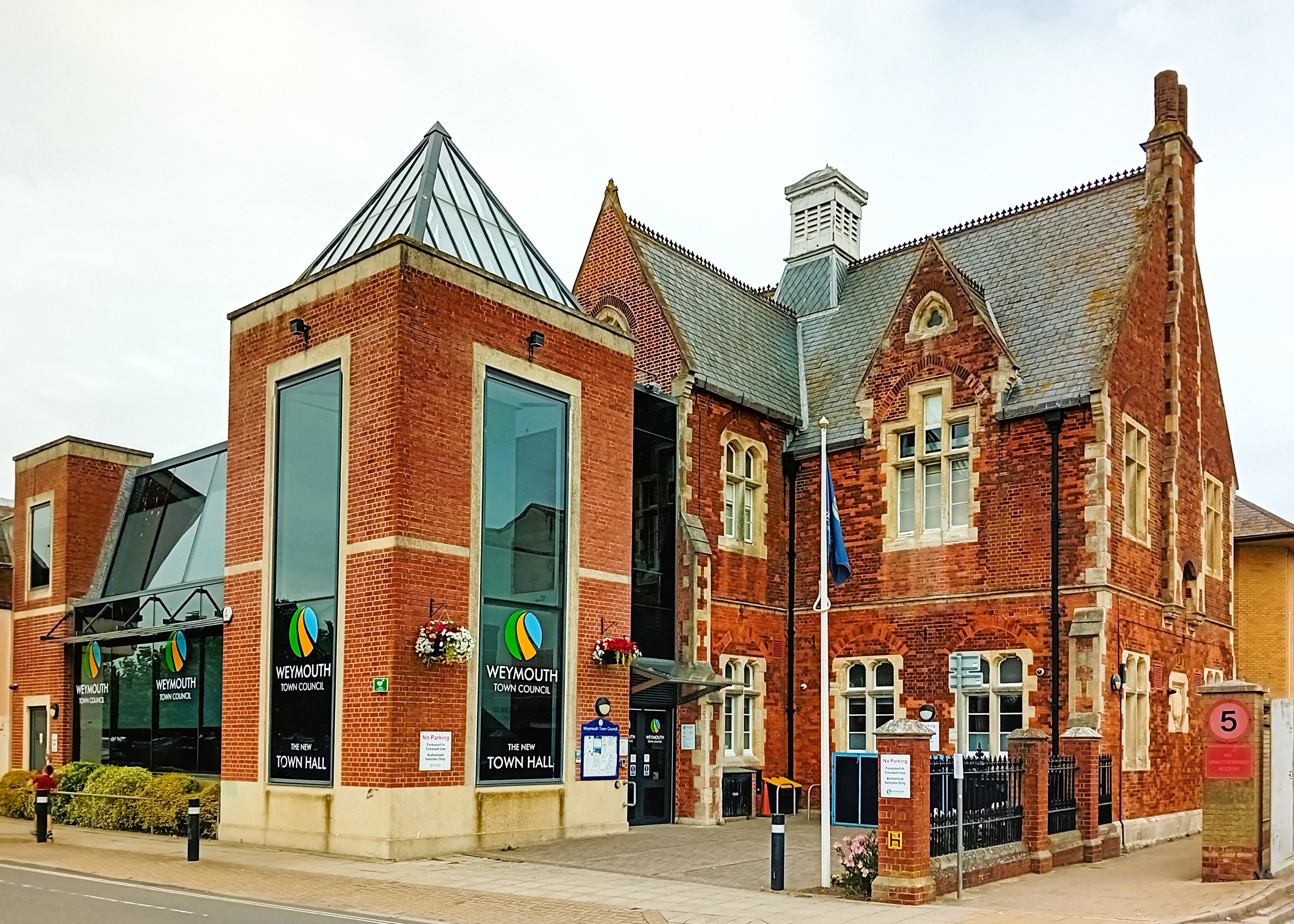
New Town Hall, Commercial Road: Town council's headquarters

There are two tiers of local government covering Weymouth, at civil parish (town) and unitary authority level: Weymouth Town Council and Dorset Council. The town council is based at the New Town Hall on Commercial Road.

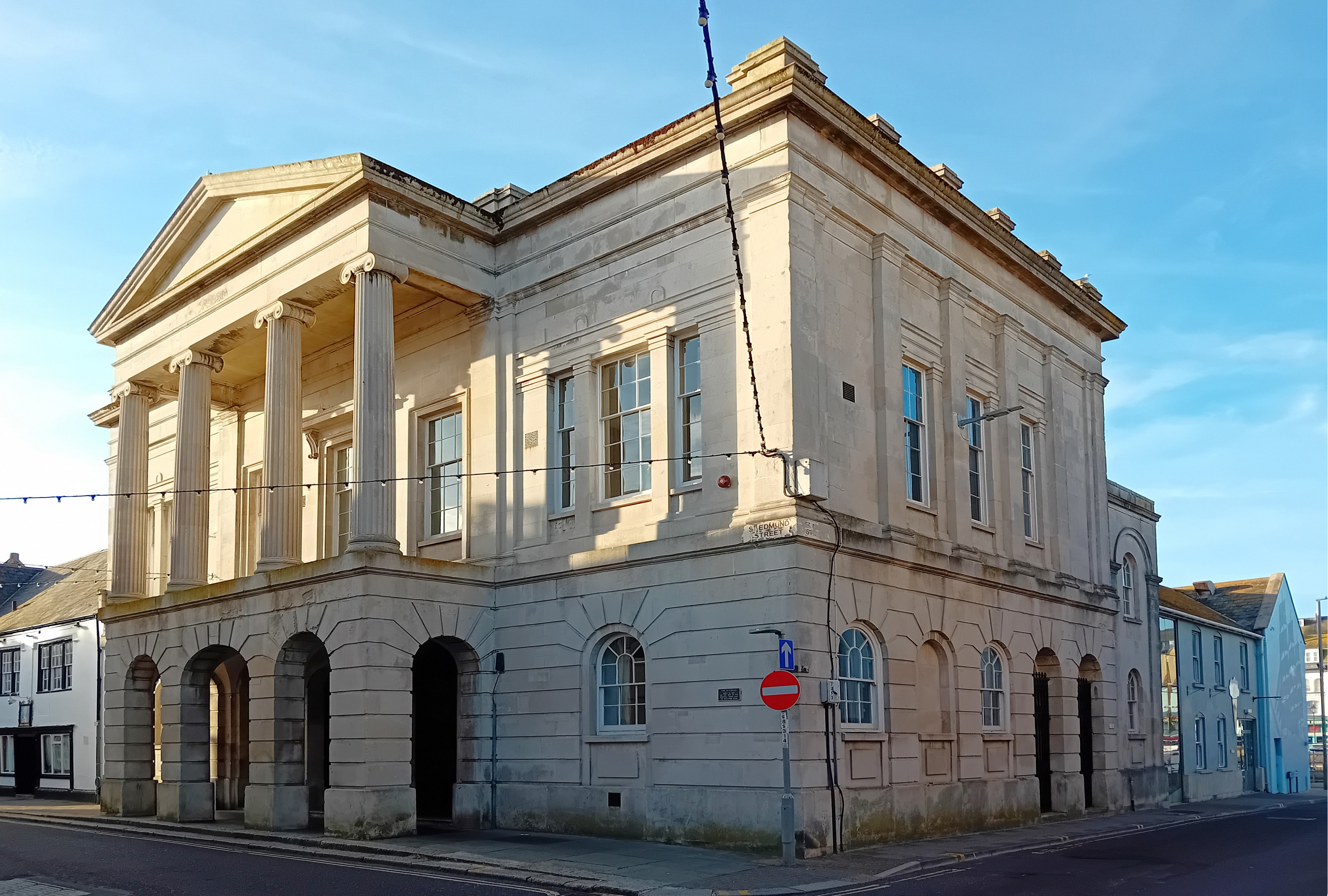
Weymouth Guildhall: Opened 1838, served as council meeting place until sold in 2014

The borough of Weymouth and Melcombe Regis had been created in 1571, administratively uniting the two formerly separate boroughs. It was reformed in 1836 to become a municipal borough under the Municipal Corporations Act 1835, which standardised how most boroughs operated across the country. The borough boundaries were significantly enlarged in 1933 when the neighbouring parishes of Broadwey, Preston, Radipole, Upwey and Wyke Regis were all abolished and their areas absorbed into the borough (with some adjustments to the boundaries with other neighbouring parishes).

The borough of Weymouth and Melcombe Regis was abolished in 1974 under the Local Government Act 1972. The area was merged with the neighbouring urban district of Portland to become a new borough called Weymouth and Portland.

Further local government reforms in 2019 abolished the borough of Weymouth and Portland, with that council's functions passing to Dorset Council as the new unitary authority for the area. A new civil parish called Weymouth was created at the same time for the unparished part of Weymouth and Portland, corresponding to the pre-1974 borough of Weymouth and Melcombe Regis. The Town Council is based at the New Town Hall, which had been built in 1860 as a school, then served as an arts centre from 1955 until 2007. It was then converted to become the offices of Weymouth and Portland Borough Council, and transferred to the new Weymouth Town Council on the local government reorganisation in 2019.

The following wards of Weymouth elect councillors to Dorset Council: Littlemoor and Preston, Melcombe Regis, Radipole, Rodwell and Wyke, Upwey and Broadwey and Westham.

Weymouth, Portland and the Purbeck district are in the South Dorset parliamentary constituency, which elects one Member of Parliament: since 2024, Lloyd Hatton (Labour). Dorset South was the most marginal Labour seat in the 2001 general election, won by 153 votes. Jim Knight was expecting to have a difficult 2005 election, yet he won with a margin of 1,812 votes—this was in contrast to other areas, where Labour suffered a decline in popularity. This was helped by a high-profile anti-Conservative campaign by musician Billy Bragg. The seat was gained from Labour by Richard Drax for the Conservatives at the 2010 General Election, and held by him in 2015, 2017 and 2019.

Weymouth and Portland have been twinned with the town of Holzwickede in North Rhine-Westphalia, Germany, since 1986, and the French town of Louviers, in the department of Eure in Normandy, since 1959.

== Geography ==
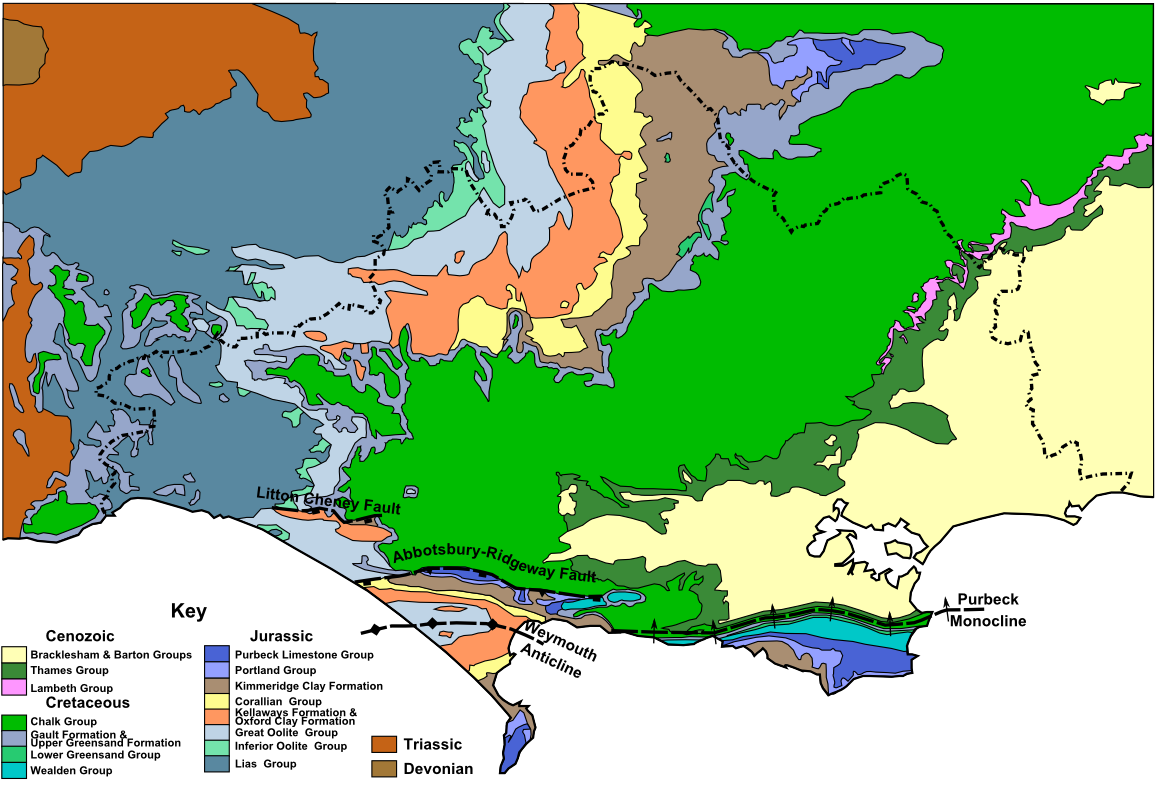
Geological map of Dorset. Weymouth lies on weak Middle Oolite clay.

Weymouth is built on weak sand and clay rock which in most places along the Dorset coast, except for narrow bands at Lulworth Cove, Swanage and Durdle Door, has been eroded and transported away. This weak rock has been protected at Weymouth by Chesil Beach and the strong limestone Isle of Portland that lies offshore, 3 km (2 mi) south of Wyke Regis. The island affects the tides of the area, producing a double low tide in Weymouth Bay and Portland Harbour. The maximum tidal range is small, at around 2 m (7 ft).

There are two lakes in the borough, both designated Nature Reserves by the Royal Society for the Protection of Birds (RSPB)–Radipole Lake in the town centre, and Lodmoor between the town centre and Preston. Radipole Lake, the largest nature reserve, and mouth of the River Wey before it flows into Weymouth Harbour, are important habitats for fish and migratory birds, and over 200 species of plants. Radipole is an important tourist attraction; it and Weymouth Beach are situated very close to the town centre. There are 11 Sites of Special Scientific Interest in the borough, which cover an area of 1,979 acres (801 ha), and there are 37 other Nature Conservation Designations.

Situated approximately midway, Weymouth is a gateway town to the Jurassic Coast. The 155 km (96 mi) of the Dorset and east Devon coast is a UNESCO World Heritage Site which is important for its geology and landforms. The South West Coast Path has two routes around Weymouth and Portland—one around its coast, and one along the South Dorset Downs, which reduces the path's length by 31.0 km (19.3 mi). The steep ridge of chalk, locally known as The Ridgeway, separates Dorchester and Weymouth.

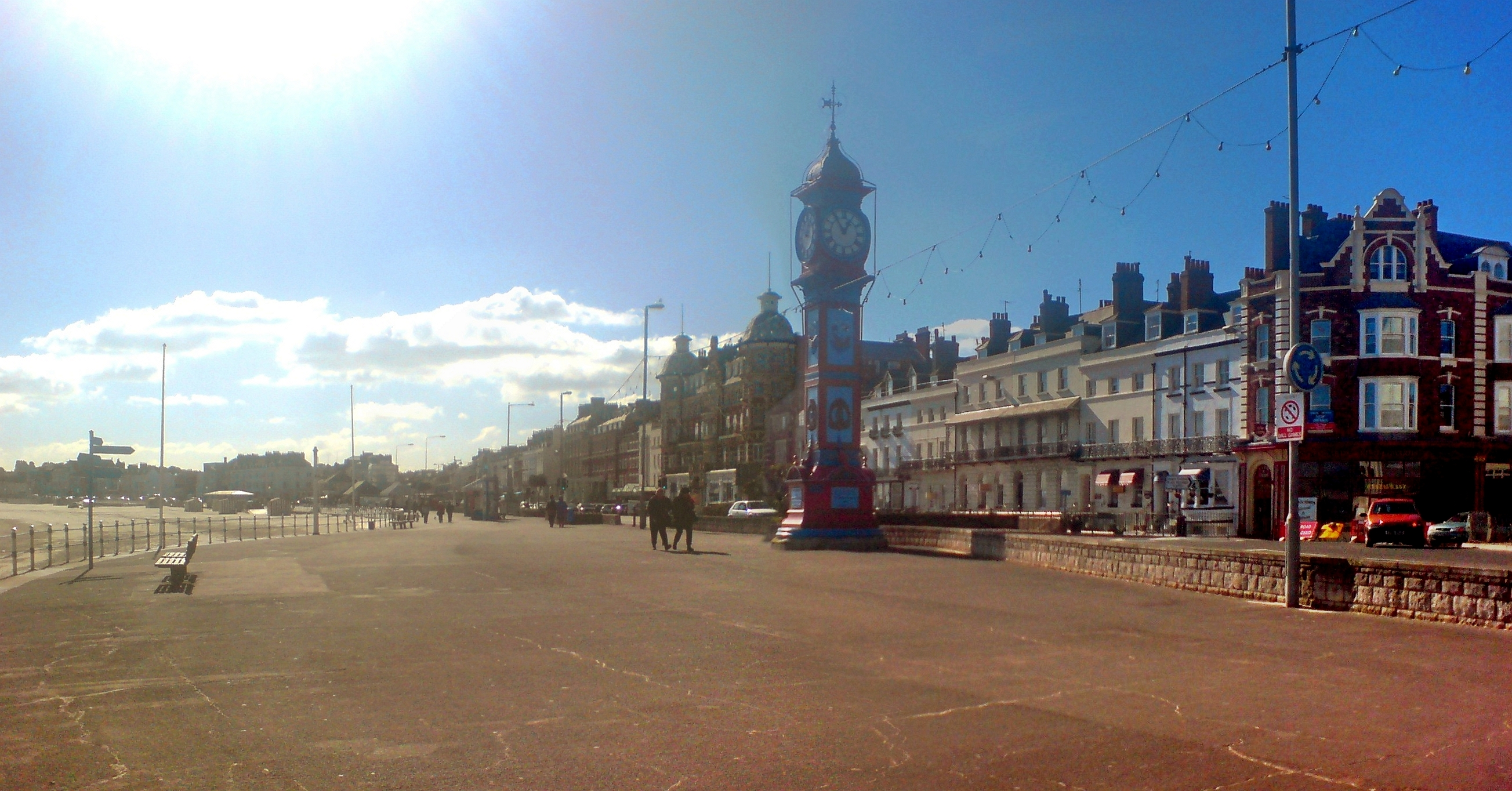
Weymouth's esplanade displays Georgian architecture and Queen Victoria's Jubilee Clock.

Weymouth is the largest town in the area, larger than the county town of Dorchester, which lies 11 km (7 mi) to the north, and hence is a centre of activity for the nearby population. Weymouth's esplanade is composed of Georgian terraces, which have been converted into apartments, shops, hotels and guest houses. The buildings were constructed in the Georgian and Regency periods between 1770 and 1855, designed by architects such as James Hamilton, and were commissioned by wealthy businessmen. These terraces form a long, continuous arc of buildings which face Weymouth Bay along the esplanade, which is home to statues of Victoria, George III and Sir Henry Edwards, Member of Parliament for the borough from 1867 to 1885, and two war memorials.

In the centre of the town lies Weymouth Harbour, separating the two areas of Melcombe Regis (the main town centre) and Weymouth (the southern harbourside) from each other. Since the 18th century they have been linked by successive bridges over the narrowest part of the harbour. The present Town Bridge, built in 1930, is a lifting bascule bridge allowing boats to access the inner harbour.

The sand and clay on which Weymouth is built is very low-lying—large areas are below sea level, which allowed the eastern areas of the town to flood during extreme low pressure storms. In the 1980s and 1990s a sea wall was built around Weymouth Harbour and along the coast road in Preston; a rip rap groyne in Greenhill and beach nourishment up to Preston have created a wide and artificially graded pebble beach, to ensure that the low-lying land around Lodmoor does not flood. The defences at Preston, the extended ferry terminal and the widening of the esplanade have changed the sediment regime in Weymouth Bay, narrowing the beach at Greenhill and widening the sands in Weymouth. A study conducted as part of the redevelopment of the Pavilion complex showed that the proposed marina will contribute slightly to this effect, but sand dredged out of the marina could be used to make the beach up to 40 m (130 ft) wider.

=== Climate ===
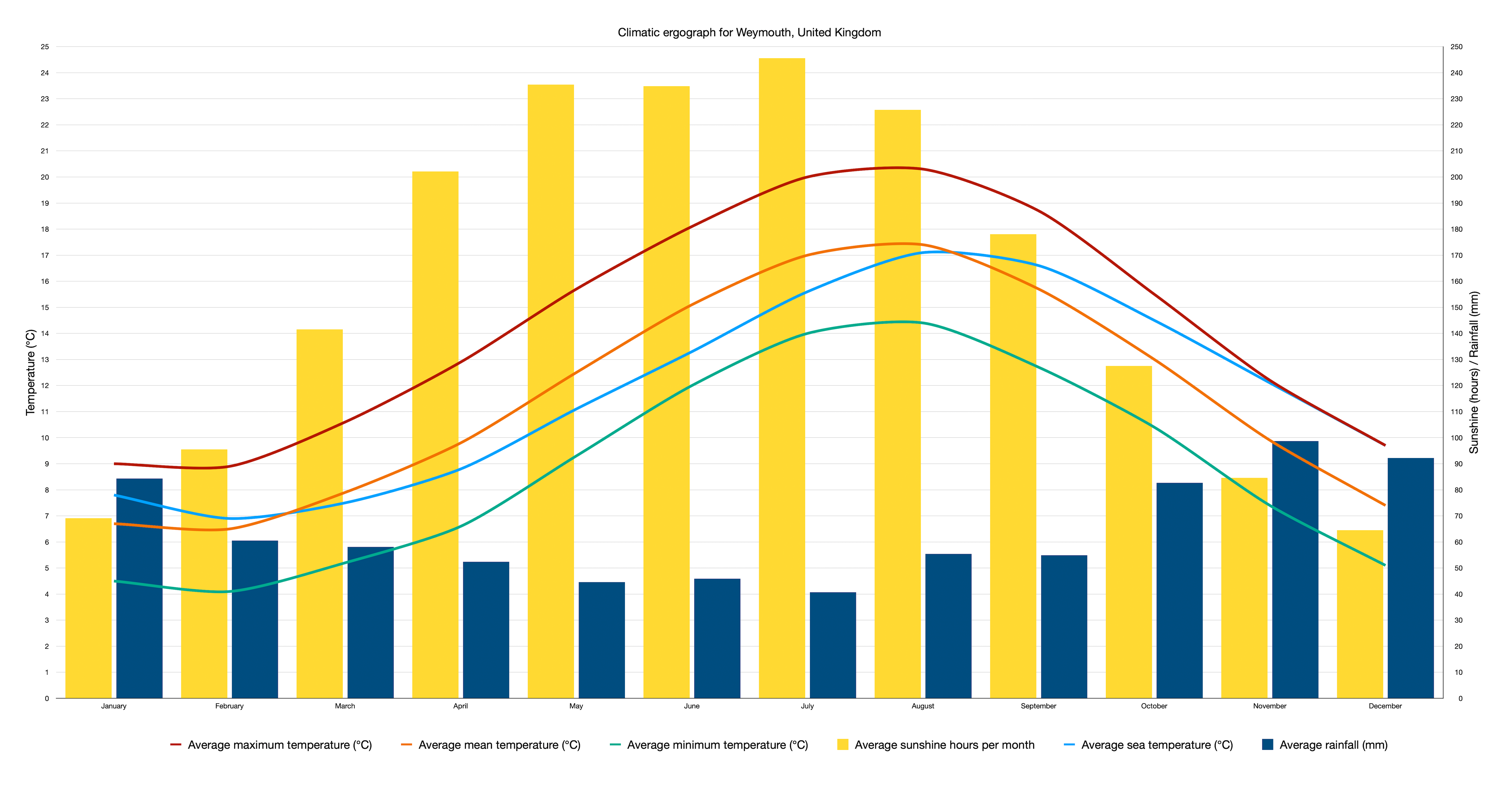
Climatic ergograph for Weymouth. Sea temperatures (light blue line) remain mild in winter and warm slowly in spring, helping to produce a seasonal lag of 1–2 months.

Due to its location on the south-west coast of England, Weymouth has a temperate climate (Köppen climate classification Cfb), with a small variation in daily and annual temperatures. The average annual mean temperature from 1991 to 2020 was 11.6 °C (52.9 °F). The warmest month is August, which has an average temperature range of 14.4 to 20.3 °C (57.9 to 68.5 °F), and the coolest is February, which has a range of 4.1 to 8.9 °C (39.4 to 48.0 °F). Maximum and minimum temperatures throughout the year are above England's average, and Weymouth is in American Horticultural Society (AHS) Heat zone 1.^{[B]} Mean sea surface temperatures range from 7.0 °C (44.6 °F) in February to 17.2 °C (63.0 °F) in August; the annual mean is 11.8 °C (53.2 °F).

Days with snow lying are rare: on average zero to five days per year; Most winters have one day or less with snow lying. It may snow or sleet in winter, yet it rarely settles on the ground; low-lying coastal areas on the South Coast of England such as Weymouth experience milder winters than the rest of the United Kingdom. The lowest temperature of −9.8 °C (14.4 °F) was recorded on 13 January 1987. The growing season in Weymouth lasts for more than 310 days per year,^{[D]} and the borough is in Hardiness zone 9b.^{[E]}

Weymouth and Portland has one of the sunniest climates in the United Kingdom, along with many south coast towns. The resort averaged 1904.4 hours of sunshine annually between 1991 and 2020, which is 44% of the maximum possible,^{[C]} and 42% above the United Kingdom average of 1402.7 hours. July 2026 holds the record for the sunniest ever month in the UK, with 409.2 hours (13.2 hours per day). December is the cloudiest month (64.5 hours of sunshine), November the wettest (98.7 mm (3.9 in) of rain) and July is the sunniest and driest month (245.6 hours of sunshine, 40.7 mm (1.6 in) of rain). Sunshine totals in all months are well above the United Kingdom average, and monthly rainfall totals throughout the year are less than the UK average, particularly in summer; this summer minimum of rainfall is not experienced away from the south coast of England. The average annual rainfall of 770.4 mm (30.3 in) is well below the UK average of 1,163.0 mm (45.8 in).

Climate data for Weymouth, Wyke Regis (1991-2020 normals, extremes 1993-2015)
Month	Jan	Feb	Mar	Apr	May	Jun	Jul	Aug	Sep	Oct	Nov	Dec	Year
Record high °C (°F)	13.6 (56.5)	14.1 (57.4)	20.7 (69.3)	22.4 (72.3)	25.3 (77.5)	27.5 (81.5)	28.0 (82.4)	31.9 (89.4)	26.7 (80.1)	23.2 (73.8)	17.1 (62.8)	14.4 (57.9)	31.9 (89.4)
Mean daily maximum °C (°F)	9.0 (48.2)	8.9 (48.0)	10.6 (51.1)	12.9 (55.2)	15.7 (60.3)	18.1 (64.6)	20.0 (68.0)	20.3 (68.5)	18.7 (65.7)	15.5 (59.9)	12.2 (54.0)	9.7 (49.5)	14.3 (57.7)
Daily mean °C (°F)	6.7 (44.1)	6.5 (43.7)	7.9 (46.2)	9.8 (49.6)	12.5 (54.5)	15.1 (59.2)	17.0 (62.6)	17.4 (63.3)	15.7 (60.3)	13.0 (55.4)	9.9 (49.8)	7.4 (45.3)	11.6 (52.9)
Mean daily minimum °C (°F)	4.5 (40.1)	4.1 (39.4)	5.2 (41.4)	6.6 (43.9)	9.3 (48.7)	12.0 (53.6)	14.0 (57.2)	14.4 (57.9)	12.7 (54.9)	10.4 (50.7)	7.4 (45.3)	5.1 (41.2)	8.8 (47.8)
Record low °C (°F)	−5.6 (21.9)	−4.0 (24.8)	−2.6 (27.3)	−2.1 (28.2)	2.6 (36.7)	6.3 (43.3)	9.1 (48.4)	8.2 (46.8)	5.0 (41.0)	−0.1 (31.8)	−3.2 (26.2)	−4.9 (23.2)	−5.6 (21.9)
Average precipitation mm (inches)	84.3 (3.32)	60.5 (2.38)	58.1 (2.29)	52.4 (2.06)	44.6 (1.76)	45.9 (1.81)	40.7 (1.60)	55.4 (2.18)	54.9 (2.16)	82.7 (3.26)	98.7 (3.89)	92.2 (3.63)	770.4 (30.33)
Average precipitation days (≥ 1.0 mm)	12.9	10.8	9.0	8.5	8.2	7.2	6.7	8.3	8.0	11.9	13.2	13.1	117.5
Mean monthly sunshine hours	69.1	95.5	141.5	202.1	235.4	234.8	245.6	225.7	178.1	127.5	84.6	64.5	1,904.4
Source 1: Met Office
Source 2: Starlings Roost Weather

== Demography ==
Religion (2011)	%^{[F]}
Buddhist	0.4
Christian	61.0
Hindu	0.1
Jewish	0.1
Muslim	0.5
No religion	29.3
Other	0.7
Sikh	0.1
Not stated	7.9

Age	%
0–17	18.6%
18–29	12.5%
30–59	37.9%
60–84	27.4%
85+	3.3%

The population of Weymouth civil parish at the 2021 census was 53,416, making it the largest settlement in rural Dorset and third largest overall, after Bournemouth and Poole. A built-up area of 18.5 km^{2} (4,600 acres), gives the town a population density of 2,868 people per square kilometre, in 26,747 dwellings.

The Office for National Statistics define a "Weymouth Built-up Area", which includes parts of the neighbouring parishes of Bincombe and Chickerell, having a total population of 55,535 in 2021. A larger "greater Weymouth" area defined by CityPopulation.de, including Bincombe, Chickerell, Osmington and Portland, has a population of 72,802.

The number of residents has grown steadily since the 1970s and there is an above average number of residents aged 60–84 (27.4%); however, this is less than the Dorset average of 30.2%, and the proportion of those between 18 and 59 is also above the Dorset average. The population is 95.2% White British, slightly below the Dorset average of 95.6%, and well above the England and Wales average of 80.5%. The most common religious identity in Weymouth and Portland is Christianity, at 61.0%, which is slightly above the England and Wales average of 59.3%. The next-largest group is those with no religion, at 29.3%, slightly above the average of 25.1%.

Historical population of Weymouth
Year	1901	1911	1921	1931	1941	1951	1961	1971	1981	1991	2001	2011
Population	19,843	22,324	24,556	22,188	38,527	37,099	41,045	42,370	45,090	48,350	50,920	52,266

== Economy ==
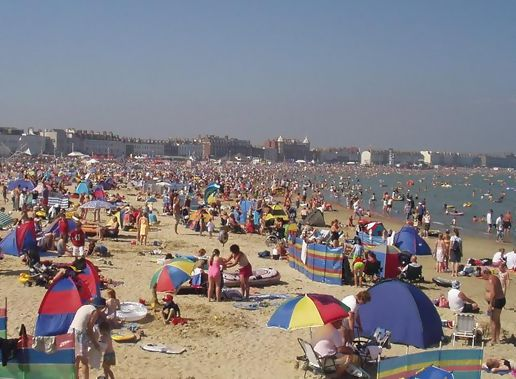
Weymouth Beach attracts thousands of visitors in summer.

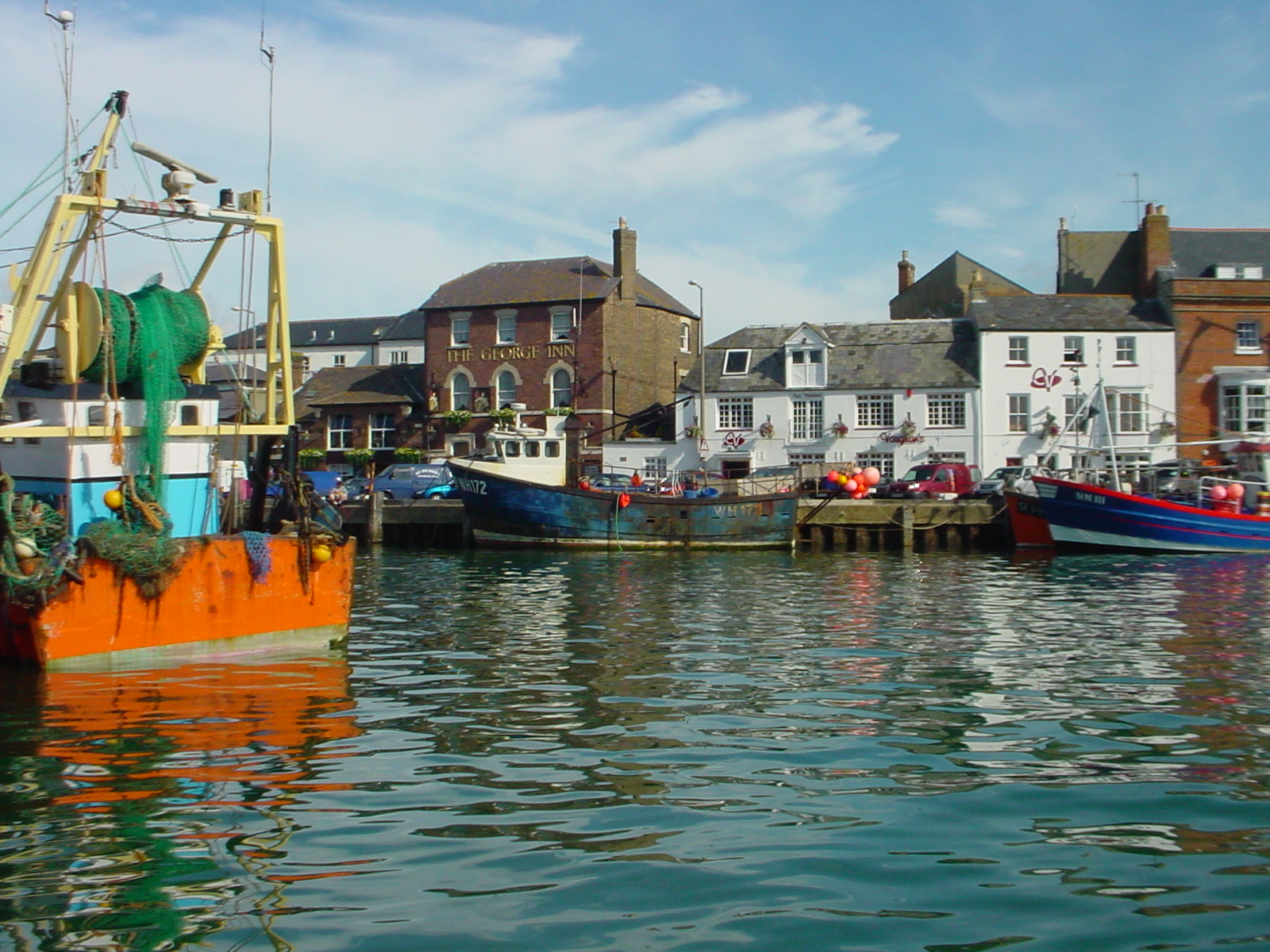
Weymouth's outer harbour hosts a large fishing fleet.

Tourism is important to the local economy, employing 17% of the local workforce. In 2019, over two million day trips and 469,600 longer stays, brought £209,560,000 of visitors money into the Weymouth and Portland area. Weymouth's coast and beaches, lakes, museums, aquarium, and two shopping centres are the main attractions for visitors. The visitor accommodation consists of hotels on the seafront, guest houses around the town centre, and caravan and camping sites just out of town, including three sites owned by Haven and British Holidays: Littlesea, Seaview and Weymouth Bay.

In 2019 there were 2,160 business units in the Weymouth and Portland area, employing 18,000 local residents. The largest sector was Wholesale, Retail and Repair at 17.66% of all local businesses. Construction and Accommodation and food services were the next two largest sectors with a 13.66% share each. Most businesses, 83.1%, had less than nine employees while only 0.5% were large, employing over 250 staff. Two of the area's largest employers are the aerospace parts manufacturer, FGP systems, and the retail clothing firm, New Look.

Weymouth Harbour is long and narrow, and formed the estuary of the River Wey until the building of a dam in 1872, which separated the harbour's backwaters from Radipole Lake. For centuries the harbour was a passenger terminal and trade and cargo port: goods handled included wool and spices, and in the 20th century, fertiliser and cars. Cross-Channel ferry services ceased in 2015 but the harbour is still a working port with docks, unloading areas and a fishing fleet, which in 2004 had 82 boats, catching the largest mass of fish in England and the third largest in the United Kingdom. Fishing and cargo trading employ fewer people in the area since their peak in earlier centuries, the commercial fishing fleet has been reduced to 32 vessels but, together with the charter boats, was still worth £4 million per annum in 2018. Local boats offer fishing and diving trips, pleasure cruises along the Jurassic Coast, and thrill-rides to the Isle of Portland.

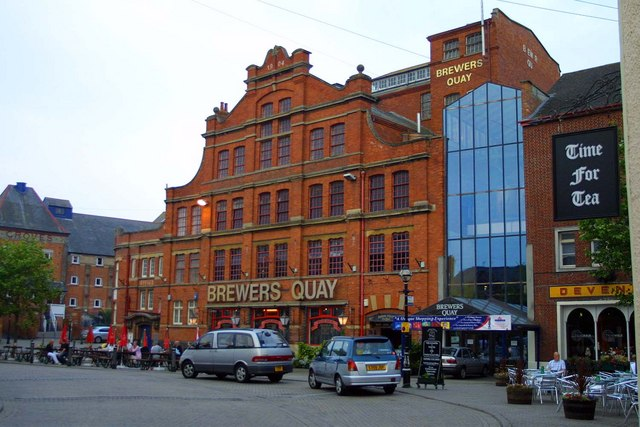
Brewers Quay museum and shopping centre on the harbourside

The main shopping centre in the area is in Melcombe Regis, consisting of two pedestrianised streets (St. Thomas's and St. Mary's Street), shops along the esplanade, and a new precinct stretching from St. Thomas's Street to the harbourside, built in the 1990s. There are shops and restaurants in the pedestrianised Hope Square and Brewers Quay, which are linked to the town centre by town bridge and a small passenger ferry service across the harbour. In 2005 the town centre had 292 shops and 37,500 m^{2} (404,000 sq ft) of floorspace, and there was 0.4 km^{2} (100 acres) of industrial estate in the area. Weymouth, Portland and Chickerell have been a Fairtrade Zone since 2007 and in May 2013 local businesses voted in favour of creating the Weymouth Business Improvement District (BID). Like other BIDs located around the UK, it is a business-led initiative supported by Government legislation that enables the local businesses to raise funding to improve the trading environment.

The town has undergone considerable regeneration, much of it in anticipation of 2012 Summer Olympics. Work began in 2007 on improvements to the esplanade: a public square was constructed around the restored statue of King George III, the Art Deco, a tourist information centre and café was built (2020), along with repairs and painting to existing Victorian-style shelters and new cafe seasonal kiosks, a beach rescue centre (2020), and a sand art pavilion for the sculptures of Mark Anderson. Other alterations to the promenade were made, particularly around key areas such as the Jubilee Clock and the pier bandstand, with the introduction of new cafes and bars, improved lighting and seating areas with planting, fountains and trees.

Figures released by the Ministry of Housing, Communities and Local Government, in 2014 and 2019, suggested that the ex-borough of Weymouth and Portland was in the top 10% of the most deprived districts in the UK. Central Weymouth and the Littlemoor estate were the town's worst areas. Although unemployment is relatively low, at just over 4%, much of the work is seasonal, part time, and low paid.

A Government initiative to help reinvigorate seaside economies was announced in 2015 and in 2019, Weymouth was awarded £3.79 million from the Coastal Communities Fund. The money will help with refurbishment of the area around the town's quay; first proposed in 2006, the plans were abandoned in favour of other works prior to the 2012 Olympics. In addition to beautification and better access, aimed at attracting visitors, there will be improved facilities for fishermen, including secure compounds for equipment and increased cold storage for catches. The town was voted Number 1 in The Times and Sunday Times Best UK Beaches 2023, and best UK beach in the TripAdvisor Traveler's Choice Awards 2024.

In 2025, a long-running family-operated beach business providing pedalos and chalets ceased operations after more than 60 years, with operators citing rising costs including wages, insurance and regulatory requirements as contributing factors. Local business interests are also represented by organisations such as the Weymouth & Portland Chamber of Commerce.

== Culture and community ==
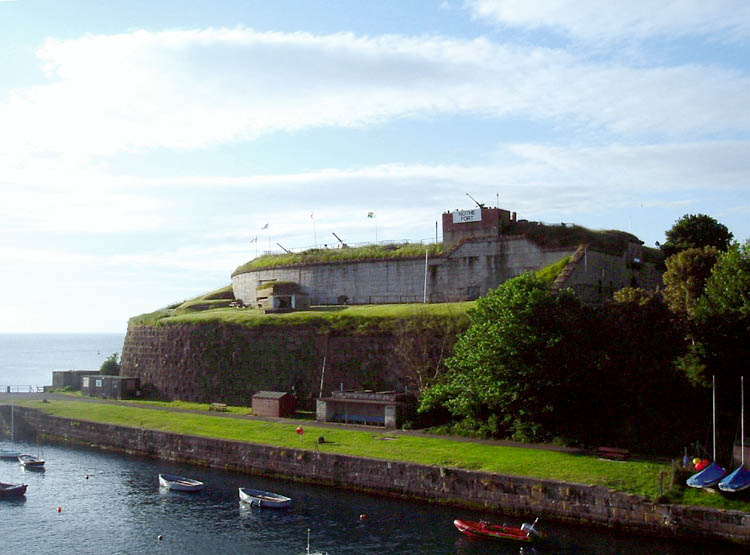
Nothe Fort is one of the museums in the town.

There are over two hundred events held throughout the year in the borough, including firework festivals, dragon boat racing, beach volleyball, Weymouth Beach Motocross, and the annual carnival in mid-August. Weymouth is the only port in the world to have hosted the start of The Tall Ships' Races three times—in 1983, 1987 and 1994; the 1994 race attracting 300,000 spectators.

The Pavilion Theatre was built in 1960 on a peninsula of reclaimed land between the harbour and the esplanade, after the Ritz Theatre was destroyed by fire in 1954. The Pavilion was owned and operated by Weymouth and Portland Borough Council, providing a venue for local community groups and schools, and hosting seasonal 'end-of-the-pier' entertainment and year-round shows and events. A failed proposal to regenerate the area in 2006, led the council to announce the demolition of the theatre and on 31 May 2013, it closed but following a formal tender process, the theatre was leased to a local businessman and reopened on 13 July 2013. Weymouth Pavilion is now operated by Weymouth Pavilion CIC as a not-for-profit organisation.

The town has both a general and a specialist museum. Weymouth Museum, located in the older part of the town, is situated in a former brewery. The Victorian building is a Grade II listed building and contains artefacts from the Roman, Tudor and Georgian periods, which relate to the town and its surrounding area, including a collection of historic maps and documents. Nothe Fort was an operational coastal fort from 1872 to 1956. It is now a museum dedicated to its own history and that of coastal defence.

Sited on the same promontory as the fort are Nothe Gardens, an informal garden of trees and established shrubberies. A large expanse of grass is a popular place for ball games and picnics while other areas are used for a nature trail and orienteering. Orienteering also takes place at Lodmoor Country Park, which is close to the town centre and also the venue for a weekly 5 km fun run. Other facilities include an outdoor gym and children's play park. Adjacent is the RSPB salt marsh nature reserve. More formal gardens, in and around the town, include Radipole Park and Greenhill gardens.

Weymouth's Sea Life centre, a zoo and adventure park on the outskirts of the town, has over 1,000 examples of aquatic and semi-aquatic life, including sharks, turtles, otters, frogs and penguins. The centre takes part in an extensive breeding programme and also helps protect marine environments across the world through its partnership with the Sea Life Trust.

== Transport ==
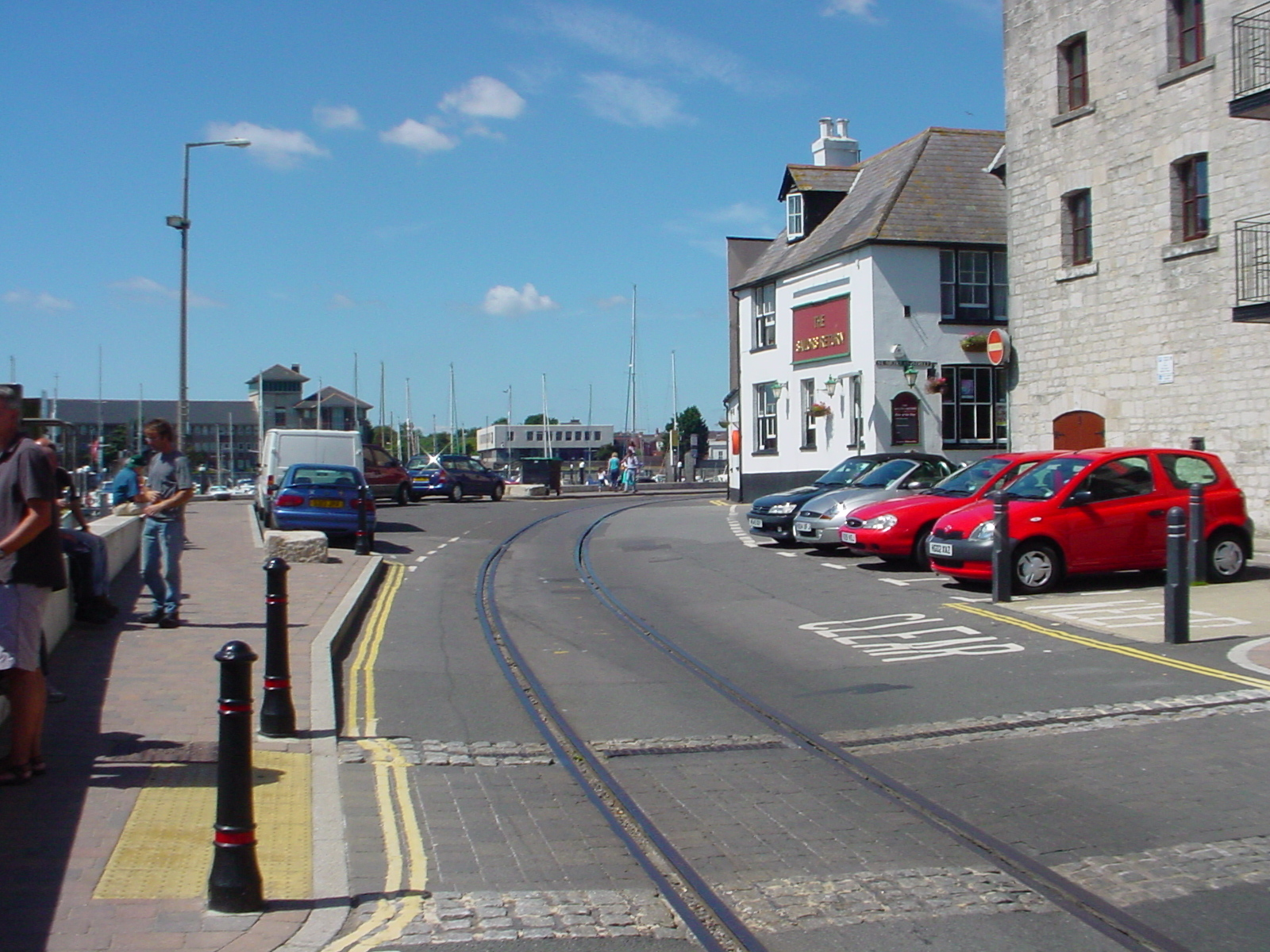
The Weymouth Harbour Tramway or Quay Branch

Weymouth railway station is the terminus of a route from London Waterloo, and a route from Westbury, Bristol and Gloucester. A station that handled summer tourist traffic was demolished in 1986 after this traffic declined. A smaller station took up part of the site and the rest was given over to commercial development. Services to London Waterloo began running every 30 minutes from December 2007, but services through Bristol to Cardiff were reduced.

An unusual feature of the railways in Weymouth was that, until 1987, main line trains ran through the streets and along the Weymouth Harbour Tramway to the Quay station at the eastern end of the harbour, to connect with ferries to mainland Europe. Due to declining business, goods traffic ceased in 1972 but passenger services continued until 1987. The line officially closed in 2016 and, in 2020, work began on its removal.

Local bus services are provided by First Bus Wessex. Routes run from Weymouth to the Isle of Portland, Dorchester, Poole, Wool, Beaminster, Axminster, and to other villages and the town's holiday parks. Weymouth is connected to towns and villages along the Jurassic Coast by route X53, which runs from Axminster to Weymouth, through Lyme Regis, Charmouth, Bridport and Abbotsbury. In addition, More Buses operate a summer only service to Durdle Door, Lulworth Cove, Wool, Dorchester, Wareham and Swanage.

The A354 road connects the town to the A35 trunk road in Dorchester and terminates at Easton on the Isle of Portland. The A353 runs east from Weymouth to the south of Warmwell, where it connects with the A352 to the Isle of Purbeck and Wareham. The B3157 runs west from Weymouth to the south of Bridport, where it terminates and connects to the A35.

On 5 April 2007, Dorset County Council granted planning permission for a single carriageway relief road, running 7 km (4 mi) north, and a 1000-space park-and-ride scheme, costing £84.5 million. Work commenced in 2008; and was completed by mid-2011. During archaeological excavations carried out in advance of the relief road construction, a burial pit containing 51 dismembered skeletons of Viking men was discovered on Ridgeway Hill. The park and ride operated significantly below capacity and, in October 2015, the council announced it would close the facility over the winter to reduce costs.

Route 26 of the National Cycle Network runs through Weymouth.

The South West Coastal Path National Trail and the Hardy Way long distance footpath pass through Weymouth.

== Education ==
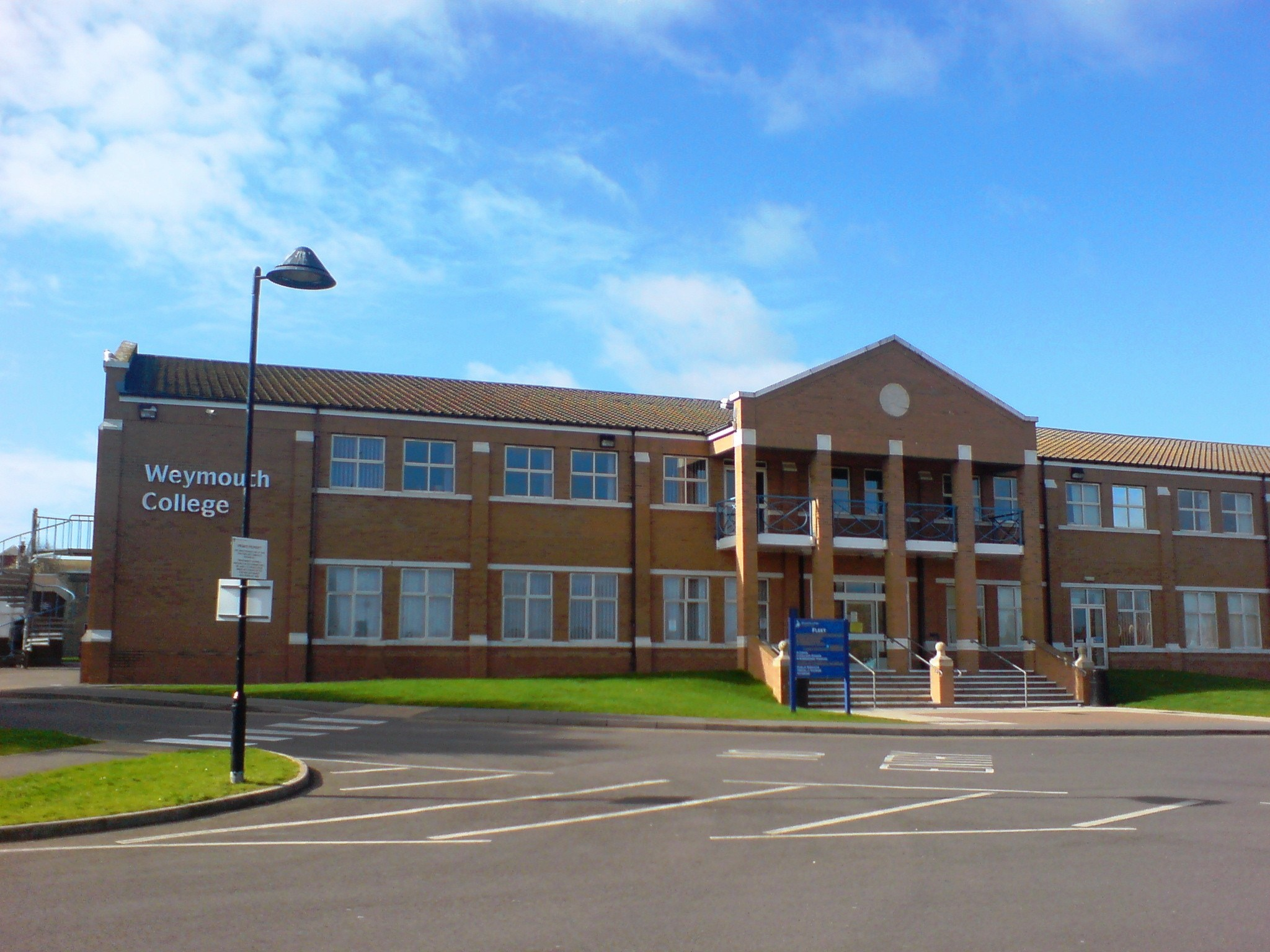
Weymouth College of further education in Melcombe Regis

Weymouth has 14 primary schools and three secondary schools. All three secondary schools—All Saints Church of England Academy in Wyke Regis; Budmouth Academy in Chickerell; and Wey Valley Academy in Broadwey—converted to academies following poor Ofsted reports. Wey Valley was added to the Government's Failing Schools list in 2007 when only 27% of the students achieved 5 A*to C passes. After consistently failing to improve, the school closed on 1 May 2019. It reopened on 1 June 2019. In 2018, All Saints' had 830 students on roll, Budmouth had 1548 and Wey Valley 863.

In 2019, 35% of students at All Saints', 36% of students at Budmouth and 21% of students at Wey Valley, attained five or more A*to C GCSEs including English and mathematics; below the national average of 43%. From 2016, schools in England have been measured on their pupils progress rather than GCSE results with greater emphasis placed on advancement in English and mathematics. Progress 8 scores, for all three schools, were below average, in 2019.

Budmouth Academy also has a sixth form centre which had 257 students in 2018, the vast majority of whom were studying for A-Level. Vocational and occupational courses are also offered. Weymouth College in Melcombe Regis is a further education college which, in 2020, had around 3,000 students from South West England and overseas. Part of the University of Plymouth Colleges Network, the college offers a wide range of practical and academic courses in many subjects, ranging from apprenticeship courses to full and part-time university level courses.

There are three special schools for children of all ages: Arbour House School, Wyvern Academy and Westfield Arts College.

The 2011 UK census recorded that 77.5% of Weymouth and Portland residents over 16 have qualifications, which is slightly above the UK national average of 76.8%; about 22.5% of adult residents have a higher than Level 4 qualification^{[H]} which is lower than the UK average of 27%.

== Sport and recreation ==
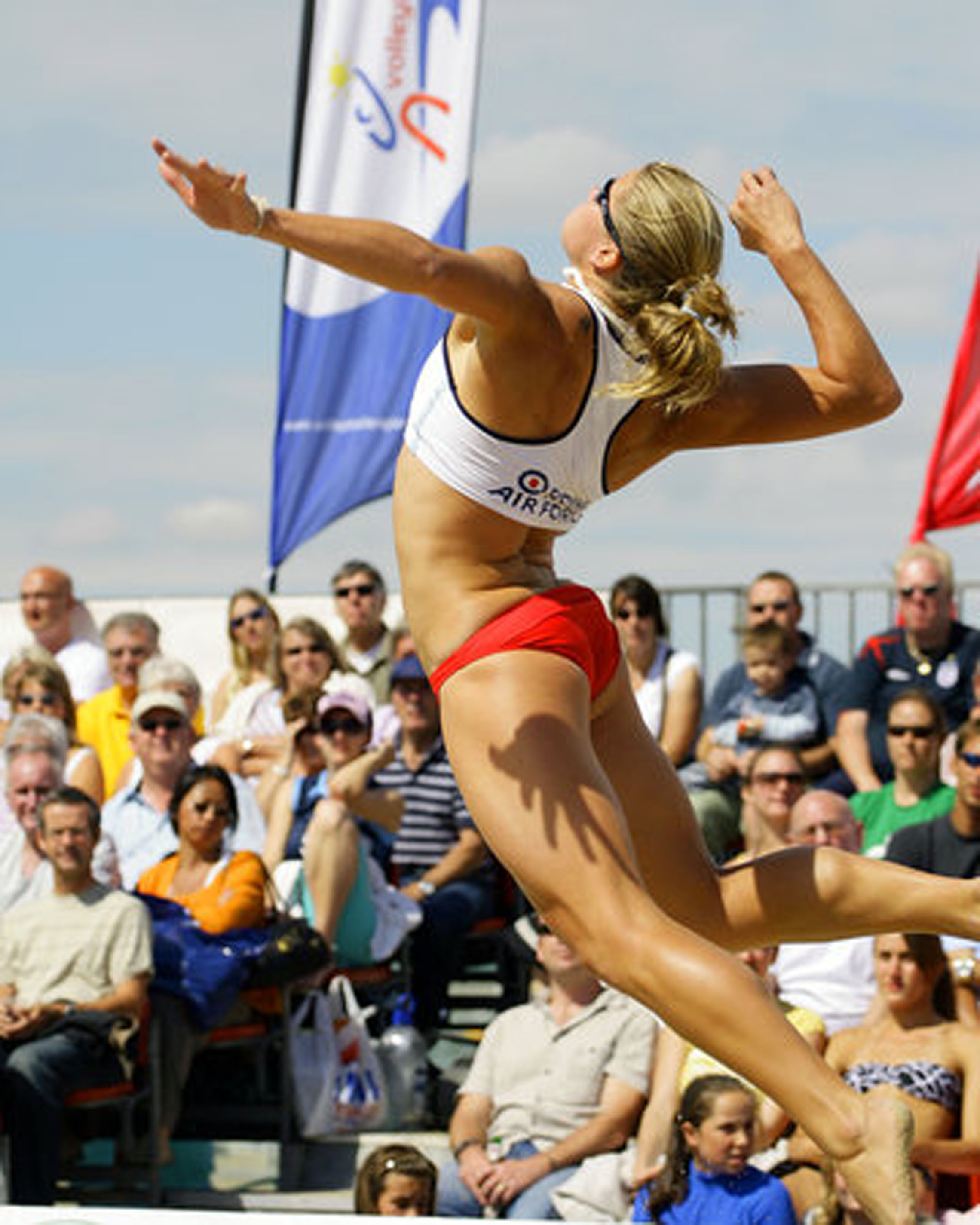
The beach volleyball classic is held on Weymouth beach every July.

Weymouth's sandy beach and shallow waters are used for swimming and sunbathing during the tourist season, and for beach sport events throughout the year, including beach motocross, the International handball championships and the beach volleyball classic. The international kite festival, held in May each year on Weymouth Beach, has attracted around 40,000 spectators to the esplanade from around the world.

Weymouth has two sports centres, one shared by the college and local community, comprising two fitness suites and a large sports hall; the other, Redlands community sports hub, has both indoor and outdoor facilities with pitches for football and cricket. The latter is home to Weymouth Cricket Club, which is sponsored by local business and runs in partnership with nearby schools. Redlands is also home to Weymouth Pickleball Club, which was created in 2022. The Weymouth Swimming Pool & Fitness Centre contains a 25-metre swimming pool, gym and fitness studio.

The local football club, Weymouth F.C. or 'the Terras', are outside the Football League but, in common with some other non-league clubs, they became professional in 2005, The team have enjoyed some success; twice playing in the third round of the FA Cup, the highest club competition level. At the end of the 2005–06 season the team were promoted as champions to the National League for the first time since 1989. Since relegated, as of 2020, they are in the National League South. The Terras' ground is the Bob Lucas Stadium; its record attendance is 6,500 against Nottingham Forest in the FA Cup 2005–2006 season. Until 2010 Motorcycle speedway racing was staged adjacent to the stadium; the club closed following disputes with the landlords and the team, the Wildcats, relocated to Poole.

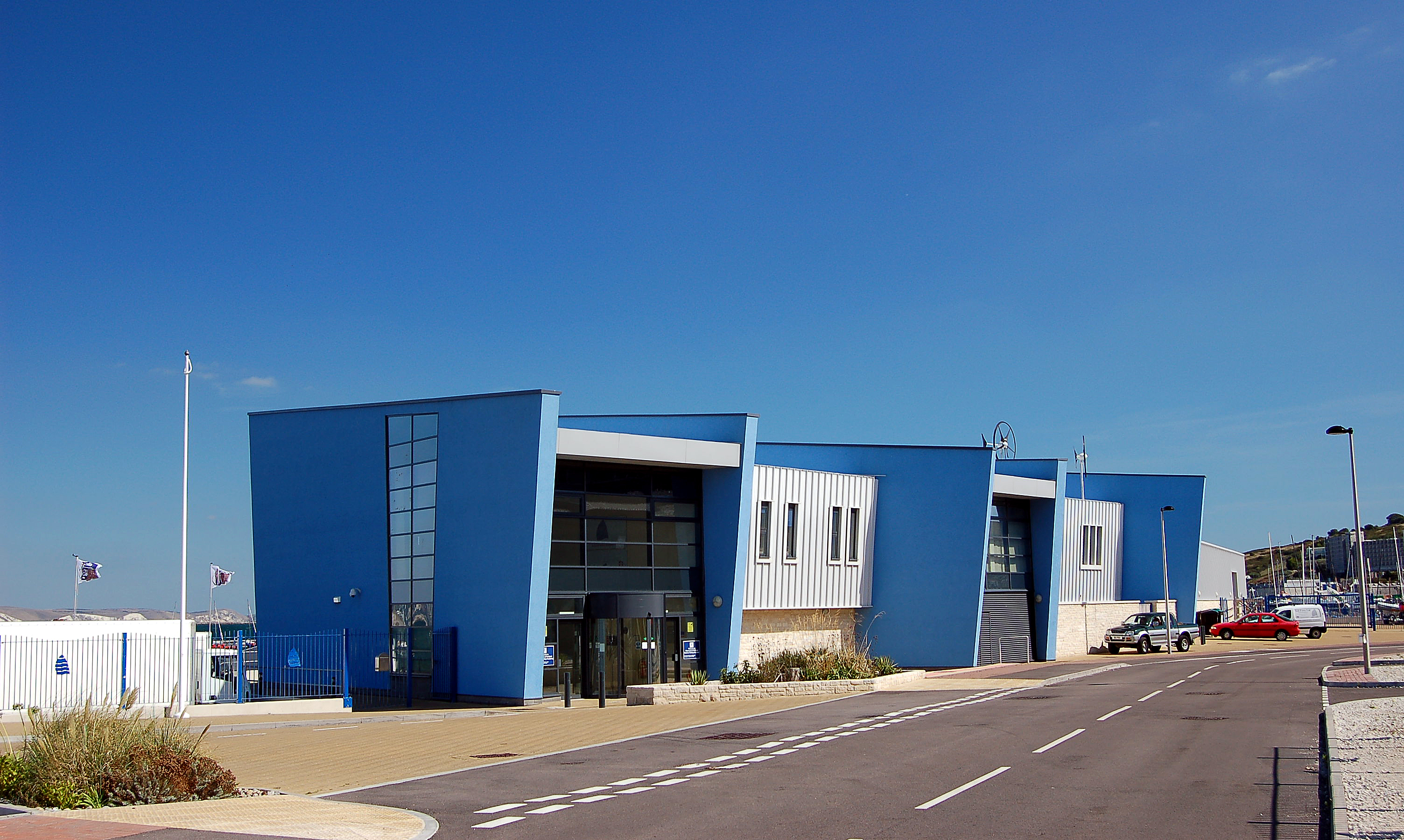
Weymouth and Portland National Sailing Academy

On the shores of Portland Harbour, 3 km (2 mi) south of Wyke Regis, is Weymouth and Portland National Sailing Academy, where the sailing events of the 2012 Olympic and Paralympic Games were based. The pre-existing venue was a major consideration in its selection. As part of the South West of England Regional Development Agency's plans to redevelop the area around the academy, a new 600-berth marina and an extension with more on-site facilities was built. Weymouth and Portland were one of the first locations in the United Kingdom to finish building a venue for the Olympic Games, as construction started in October 2007 and finished at the end of 2008.

The waters of Weymouth and Portland are credited by the Royal Yachting Association (RYA) as some of the best in Europe for sailing. Local, national and international sailing events are regularly held in the bay; these include the J/24 World Championships in 2005, trials for the 2004 Athens Olympics, the International Sailing Federation (ISAF) World Championship 2006, the 2015 ISAF Sailing World Cup, the SAP 505 World Championship in 2016 and the 2019 World Championship for International A-class catamarans.

Weymouth Bay is a venue for other water-sports—the reliable wind is favourable for wind and kitesurfing. The sheltered waters in Portland Harbour and near Weymouth are used for angling, diving to shipwrecks, snorkelling, canoeing, jet skiing, water skiing, and swimming.

== Media ==
BBC local news comes from BBC South West in Plymouth and ITV West Country in Bristol is the local ITV television franchise. Television is received from the Stockland Hill transmitter or from one of its three relay transmitters in the town (Weymouth, Bincombe Hill and Preston). Reception is also possible in some areas from the Rowridge transmitter meaning the town is also covered by local news from BBC South Today in Southampton and ITV Meridian. BBC South region is also the default BBC One variant given to Weymouth postcodes on satellite television and ITV Meridian is the default HD variant of ITV received from the Wyke Regis, Bincombe Hill and Preston relay transmitters. The local newspaper is the Dorset Echo.

Local radio stations are BBC Radio Solent on 103.8 FM, Heart South on 102.3 FM, Greatest Hits Radio South (formerly Wessex FM) on 97.2 FM and AIR Radio, a community radio station that broadcasts on 107.2 FM.

== In popular culture ==
Weymouth has been used as a location in both film and television, particularly the esplanade which features prominently in the 1958 film The Key, the 1967 version of Far from the Madding Crowd, and the 1963 Hammer Horror production The Damned. Scenes for the 1965 wartime adventure film The Heroes of Telemark were shot in the bay. Other war films filmed in areas in and around the town are The Dam Busters (1954) and the 2017 adaptation of Dunkirk.

Appearances on television include the 1980s detective series Rockliffe's Follies, where Weymouth was the setting for the fictional town of Maidenport. Some scenes from the series Broadchurch were filmed there in 2014 and in 2008, the town was the subject of an episode of the BBC soap opera EastEnders.

== Notable people ==
=== Writers ===
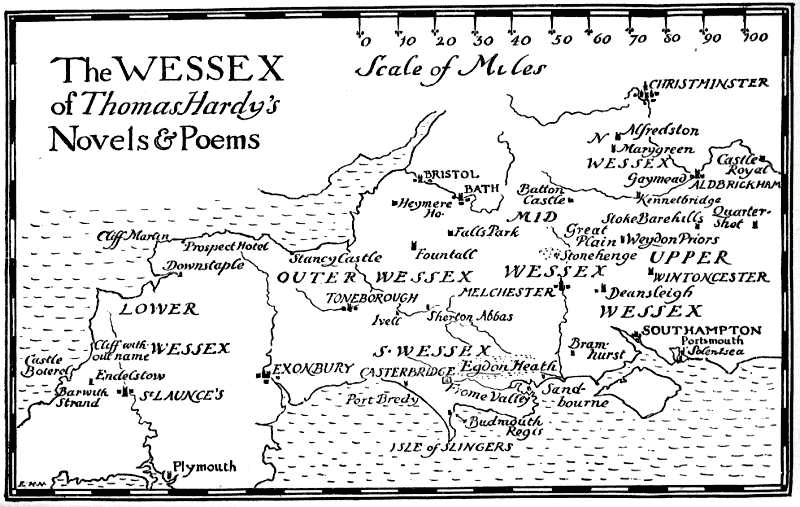
Locations in Wessex, from The Wessex of Thomas Hardy by Bertram Windle, 1902, based on correspondence with Hardy.

Notable writers are associated with Weymouth and the area has influenced, and appears in, their work. Before he was a published author, Thomas Hardy worked for a Weymouth-based architect and he visited and stayed in the town on a number of occasions between 1869 and 1872. The novel Under the Greenwood Tree was partially written there. Many of his other works incorporate features of the town and surrounding area: in The Return of the Native, one character describes Weymouth as a place where, "out of every ten folk you meet nine of 'em in love". The esplanade, Gloucester Lodge Hotel and Old Rooms feature in Hardy's The Trumpet-Major (1880); the town was renamed "Budmouth" in the 1895 edition, to bring the novel within fictional 'Wessex', and Chesil Bank is referred to in The Well-Beloved (1897).

John Cowper Powys's novel Weymouth Sands (1934) is set in Weymouth, where the writer "...was more at home than anywhere else in the world". Powys's paternal grandmother lived in Weymouth and the family lived in nearby Dorchester from 1880 to 1885. When Powys died in 1963, he was cremated and his ashes dispersed on the water around Chesil Bank.

Joseph Drew, businessman and owner of the local newspaper The Southern Times, lived and worked in Weymouth. He wrote the historical novel The Poisoned Cup, "a quaint tale of old Weymouth and Sandsfoot Castle" in 1876.

The novelist Gerald Basil Edwards spent the last years of his life in Weymouth. In nearby Upwey, he met the art student Edward Chaney, who encouraged him to complete The Book of Ebenezer Le Page.

=== Others ===
The architect Sir Christopher Wren was the Member of Parliament for Weymouth in 1702, and controlled nearby Portland's quarries from 1675 to 1717. He designed St Paul's Cathedral and had it built from the famous Portland stone. The famous artist, Sir James Thornhill was chosen to decorate the interior. He was born in Weymouth at the White Hart public house in Melcombe Regis and also served as the town's MP, in 1722.

When HMS Marlborough sailed into Algeciras Bay in April 1781, to relieve Gibraltar during the Great Siege, she was carrying aboard two natives of Weymouth: the captain, Taylor Penny and a midshipman called Joseph Spear. They were both still aboard in 1782, when Marlborough led the line at the Battle of the Saintes. Taylor became mayor of Weymouth in 1785 while Spear went on to become a Royal Navy captain in 1809, commanding HMS Royal Sovereign and HMS Temeraire.

Thomas Fowell Buxton, a social reformer and abolitionist, was Weymouth's MP from 1818 to 1835. Buxton was the leader of the slavery abolition movement in the House of Commons after William Wilberforce retired in 1825. The town's main route to the Isle of Portland is named after him. It runs past Belfield House, his former Weymouth home.

== See also ==
- 2012 Summer Olympic venues
- List of Dorset beaches
- List of churches in Weymouth and Portland
- List of people from Weymouth
- List of places in Dorset
- UK coastline
- Weymouth, Massachusetts, second settlement in Massachusetts (after Plymouth), named after Weymouth, England

== Notes ==
^{A} Population figure is an estimate for mid-2018, and includes only the town of Weymouth – not Portland or surrounding villages.
^{B} Areas in American Horticultural Society Heat Zone 1 experience less than one day per year with maximum temperatures above 30 °C (86 °F).
^{C} The maximum hours of sunshine possible in one year is approximately 4,383 hours (12 hours/day × 365.25 days).
^{D} The growing season in the United Kingdom is defined as starting on the day after five consecutive days with mean temperatures above 5 °C (41 °F). The season finishes the day after mean temperatures are below 5 °C (41 °F) for five consecutive days.
^{E} Areas in Hardiness zone 9 experience an average lowest recorded temperature each year between −6.6 and −1.1 °C (20.1 and 30.0 °F).
^{F} Figures are for Weymouth and Portland as a whole.
^{G} These figures are for July to September in 2010.
^{H} A level 4 qualification is equivalent to a Higher National Certificate or Diploma of Higher Education.
