= Rodwell (disambiguation) =

Rodwell is an English-language name.

Rodwell may also refer to

- Rodwell, California, United States
- Rodwell, Dorset
  - Rodwell Trail, Weymouth, Dorset, England
  - Rodwell Railway Station, Dorset, England
- Rodriguez well, a means of obtaining drinking water from snow
