= Sandsfoot Castle Halt railway station =

Disused railway station in Dorset, England

Coordinates: 50.5967°N 2.4615°W

Sandsfoot Castle Halt
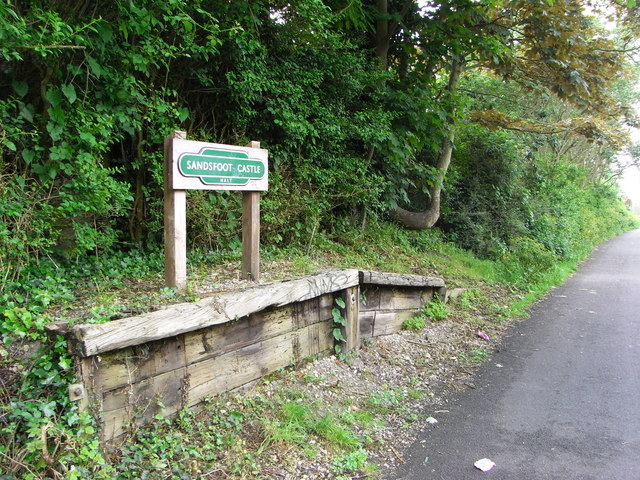
- Sandsfoot Castle railway station in 2008

General information
- Location: Dorset; England
- Platforms: 1

Other information
- Status: Disused

History
- Original company: Weymouth and Portland Railway
- Pre-grouping: Great Western Railway
- Post-grouping: Great Western Railway; British Railways (Southern Region)

Key dates
- 1 August 1932: Station opening
- 1952: Station closure
Location

Sandsfoot Castle Halt was a small railway station on the Portland Branch Railway between Weymouth and Portland in Dorset.

== Station ==
Opened on 1 August 1932, it was part of a scheme that saw several halts to counter road competition. Services were provided by railmotors, carriages equipped with driving ends and their own small steam engine. The station closed with the branch in 1952.

== Site today ==
The remains of the timber platform are located on the Rodwell Trail, a popular local walk.

Preceding station	Disused railways	Following station
Rodwell; Line and station closed	GWR and LSWR; Portland Branch Railway	Wyke Regis Halt; Line and station closed
