= Westham Halt railway station =

Disused railway station in Dorset, England

Coordinates: 50.6118°N 2.4604°W

Westham Halt
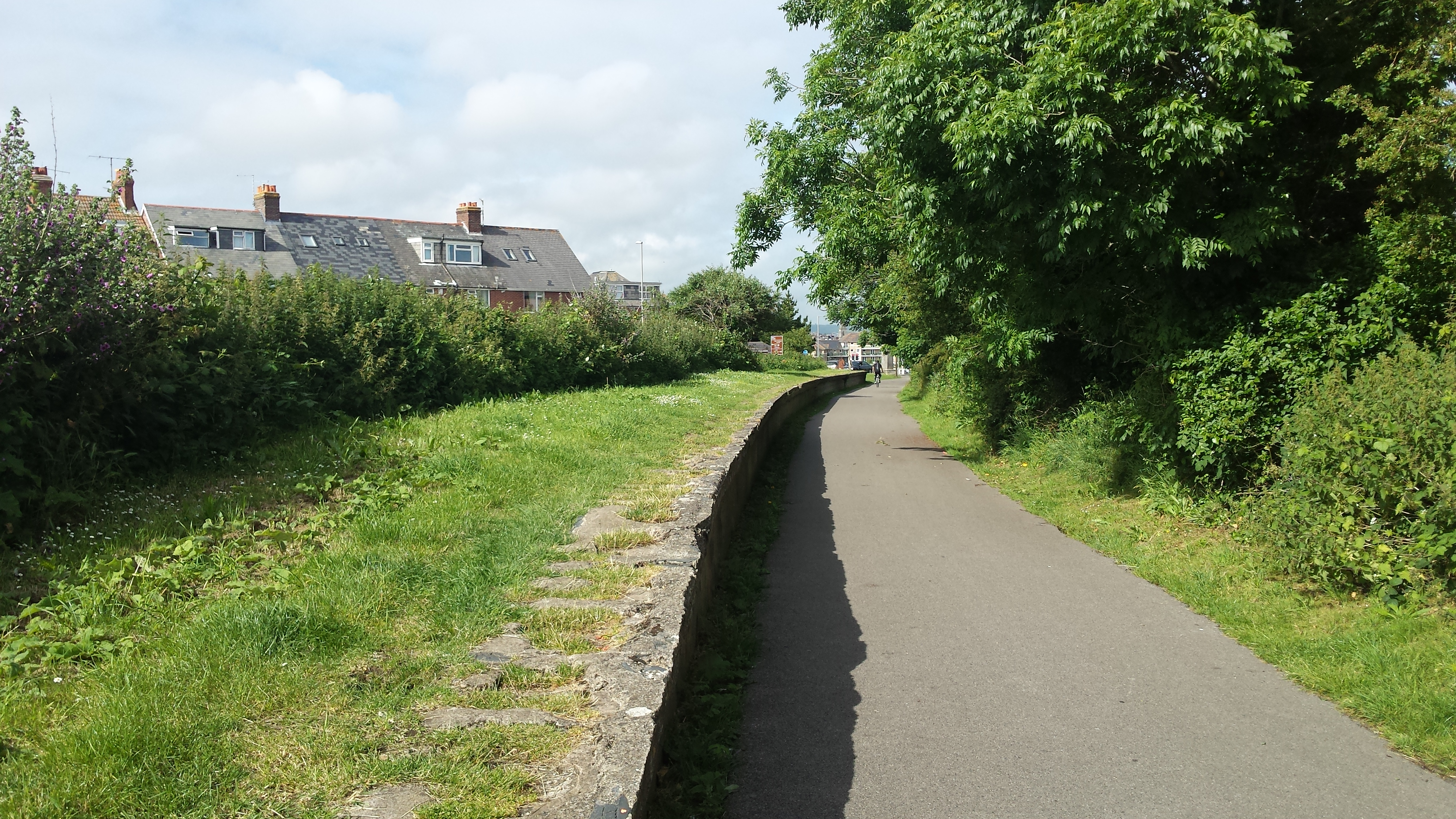
- Remains of Westham Halt in 2016

General information
- Location: Westham, Dorset; England
- Platforms: 1

Other information
- Status: Disused

History
- Original company: Weymouth and Portland Railway
- Pre-grouping: Great Western Railway
- Post-grouping: Great Western Railway; British Railways (Southern Region)

Key dates
- July 1909: Official opening
- 1952: Closed to passengers
Location

Westham Halt was a small railway station in Westham on the Portland Branch Railway in the west of the English county of Dorset.

== History ==
The first piece of equipment on the site was a small ground frame on the site, installed in 1891 to control the road crossing. The station proper was opened in July 1909, and was sited about 0.5 miles (0.80 km) south of the bridge over Radipole Lake. It was part of a scheme that saw several halts opened on the GWR and other railways to counter road competition. Services were provided by Railmotors, carriages equipped with driving ends and their own small steam engine. The station closed to passenger services with the branch in 1952.

== The site today ==
The former trackbed of the line is located on the Rodwell Trail walk. The former platform is still located next to the site of the level crossing over Abbotsbury Road.

Preceding station	Disused railways	Following station
Melcombe Regis; Line and station closed	GWR and LSWR; Portland Branch Railway	Rodwell; Line and station closed
