= Wyke Regis railway station =

Disused railway station in Dorset, England

Wyke Regis Halt
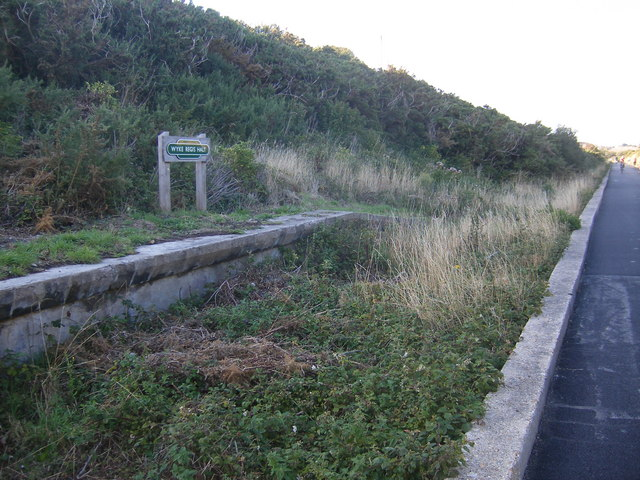
- Remains of the station platform, now a feature on the Rodwell Trail

General information
- Location: Dorset; England
- Platforms: 1

Other information
- Status: Disused

History
- Original company: Weymouth and Portland Railway
- Pre-grouping: Great Western Railway & London and South Western Railway jointly
- Post-grouping: Great Western Railway & Southern Railway jointly

Key dates
- 1 July 1909: Station opened
- 3 March 1952: Station closed
Location

Wyke Regis Halt was a small railway station on the Portland Branch Railway in the west of the English county of Dorset.

The line through the station site was opened on 16 October 1865 when the Weymouth and Portland Railway opened the mixed gauge line between the towns in its name, the line was leased jointly to the Great Western Railway and the London and South Western Railway.

Opened in July 1909, it was part of a scheme that saw several halts opened on the GWR with services provided by Railmotors to counter road competition.

The halt was reached by a footpath from Ferrybridge cottages, off Portland Road.

The station closed with the branch in 1952.

== The site today ==
The former trackbed of the line is a popular walk called the Rodwell Trail, and the platform is still there in a shallow cutting.

Preceding station	Disused railways	Following station
Sandsfoot Castle Halt; Line and station closed	GWR and LSWR; Portland Branch Railway	Portland; Line and station closed

== Bibliography ==
- Hurst, Geoffrey (1992). Register of Closed Railways: 1948-1991. Worksop, Nottinghamshire: Milepost Publications. ISBN 0-9477-9618-5.
- Quick, Michael (2023) [2001]. Railway passenger stations in Great Britain: a chronology (PDF). version 5.05. Railway & Canal Historical Society.
- St John Thomas, David (1966). A Regional History of the Railways of Great Britain. Vol. I: The West Country (3rd ed.). Newton Abbott: David & Charles.
