= Rodwell railway station =

Disused railway station in Dorset, England

Coordinates: 50.6035°N 2.4614°W

Rodwell
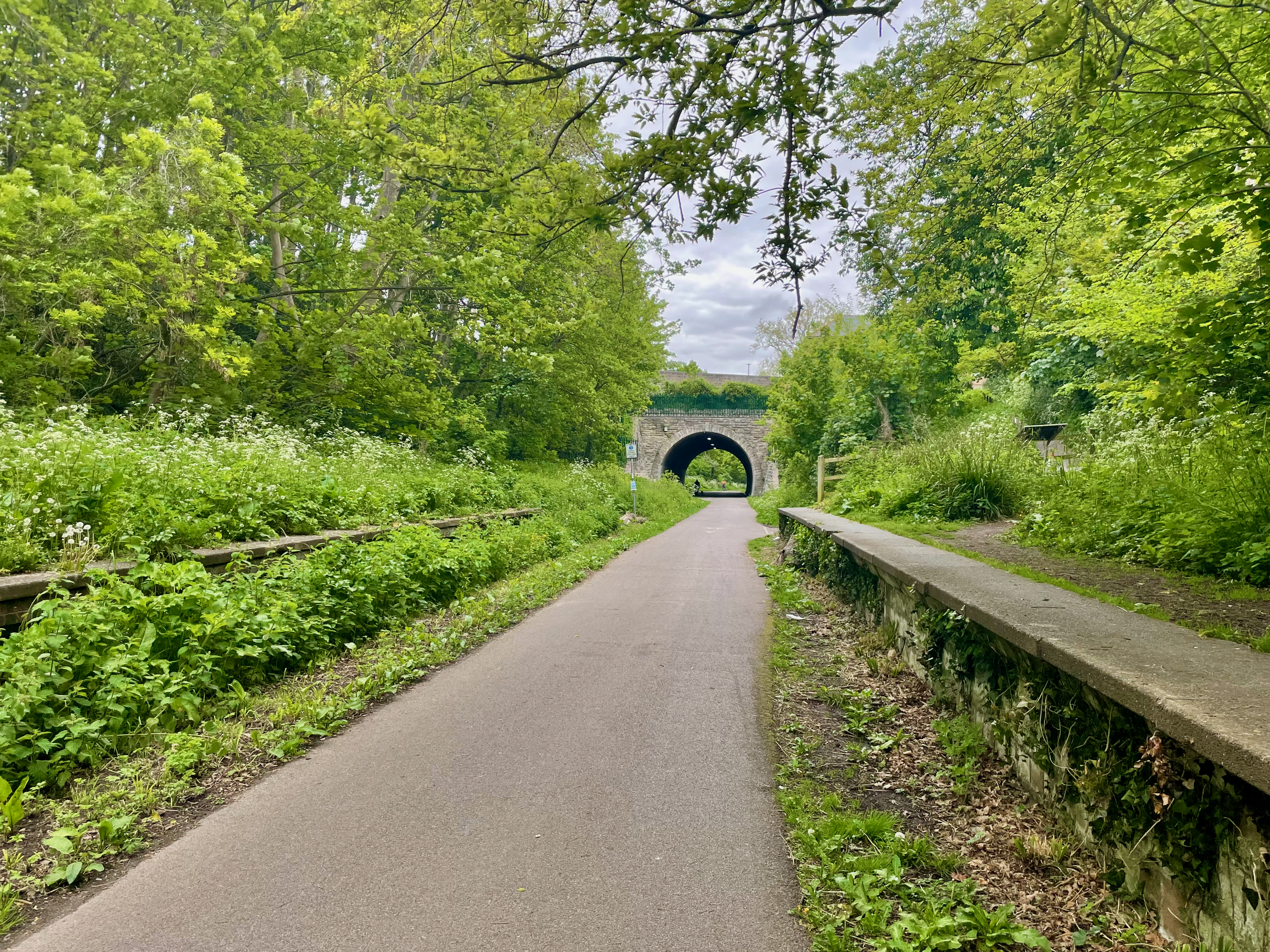
- Remains of Rodwell railway station platforms as they exist in 2021

General information
- Location: Dorset; England
- Platforms: 2

Other information
- Status: Disused

History
- Original company: Weymouth and Portland Railway
- Pre-grouping: Great Western Railway
- Post-grouping: Great Western Railway; British Railways (Southern Region)

Key dates
- 1 June 1870: Station opening
- 3 March 1952: Station closure
Location

Rodwell was a small railway station on the Portland Branch Railway in the west of the English county of Dorset.

== Station ==
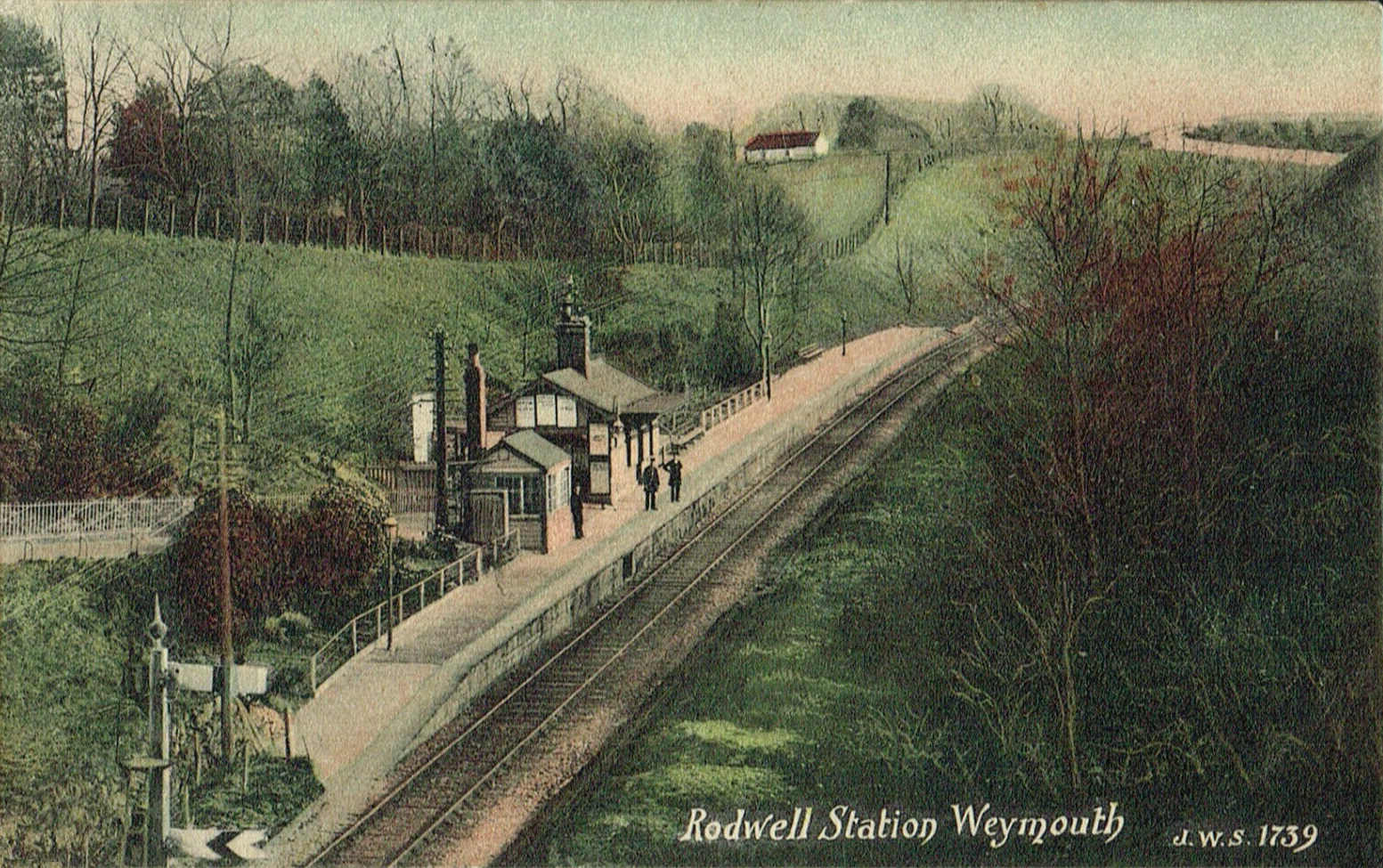
Postcard of the station, dated to June 1905

Opened on 1 June 1870, it initially had one platform. However, as part of a scheme that saw several halts opened on the GWR with Railmotor services to counter road competition, a passing place was put in and Rodwell gained another platform and a signal box. The station closed with the branch on 3 March 1952.

== The site today ==
The former trackbed of the line is now part of the Rodwell Trail footpath. The former platforms are still in place, just south of the tunnel, under a road and the former Portwey Hospital site.

Preceding station	Disused railways	Following station
Westham Halt; Line and station closed	GWR and LSWR; Portland Branch Railway	Sandsfoot Castle Halt; Line and station closed
