= Portland railway station (England) =

Disused railway station in Dorset, England

Coordinates: 50.5647°N 2.4508°W

Portland

General information
- Location: Isle of Portland, Dorset; England
- Platforms: 1

Other information
- Status: Disused

History
- Original company: Weymouth and Portland Railway
- Pre-grouping: Great Western Railway
- Post-grouping: Great Western Railway; British Railways (Southern Region)

Key dates
- 16 October 1865: Opening
- 1 September 1902: Station relocation
- 3 March 1952: Closed to passengers
- 1965: Station closure
Location

Portland was a railway station on the Portland Branch Railway in the south of the English county of Dorset. The station opened with the Easton and Church Hope Railway, one of the constituent parts of a complex line, on 16 October 1865. The station was moved to a new site on the opening of the extension to Easton on 1 September 1902.

After this, the old station was used as a goods station and depot. The extension was technically a separate railway, the Easton and Church Hope, although the branch was operated as one line throughout. The second Portland station had multiple platforms with canopies for the large staff of the Admiralty establishments around it.

The station closed to passengers in 1952, although regular freight kept the line in use until 1965. The platforms and canopies survived until the mid-1970s when the site was absorbed by the base and demolished.

Preceding station	Disused railways	Following station
Wyke Regis Halt; Line and station closed	GWR and LSWR; Portland Branch Railway	Easton (Portland); Line and station closed
