= Melcombe Regis railway station =

Disused railway station in Dorset, England

Coordinates: 50.6156°N 2.4563°W

Melcombe Regis
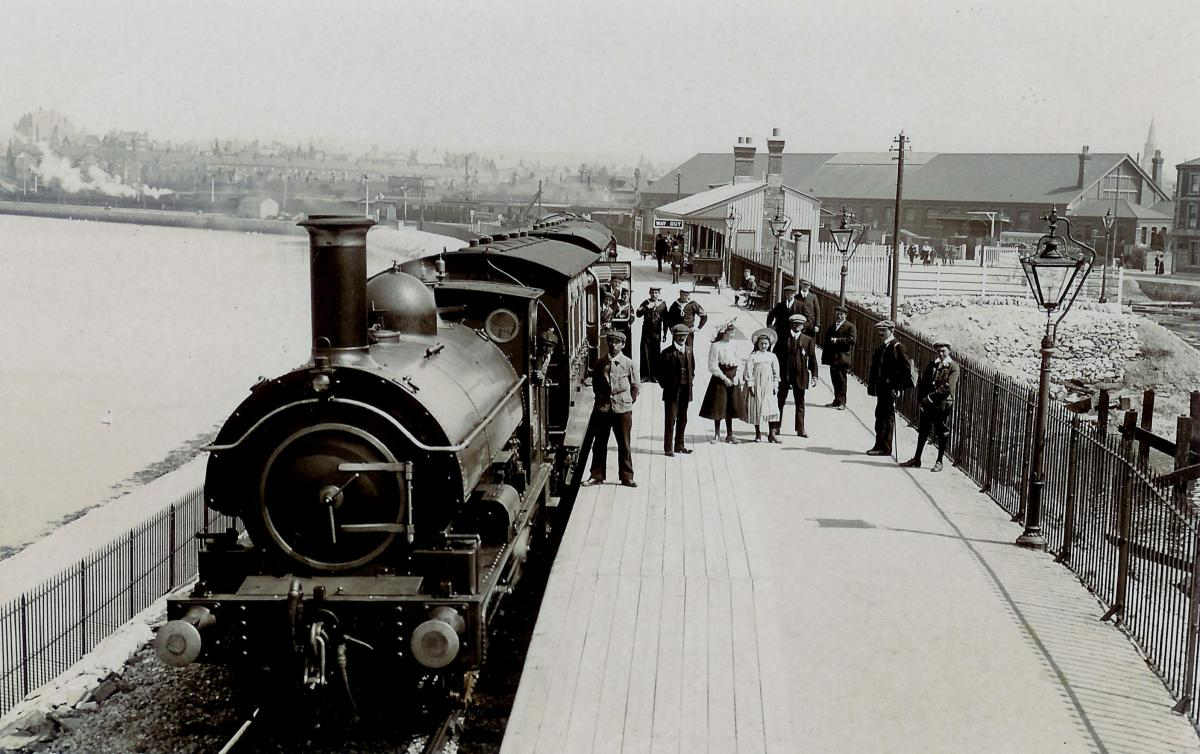
- The railway station, photographed in June 1912

General information
- Location: Melcombe Regis, Dorset; England
- Platforms: 1

Other information
- Status: Disused

History
- Original company: Weymouth and Portland Railway
- Pre-grouping: Great Western Railway
- Post-grouping: Great Western Railway; British Railways (Southern Region)

Key dates
- 30 May 1909: Opened
- 3 March 1952: Closed to passengers
- 12 September 1959: Closed
Location

Melcombe Regis was a station on the Portland Branch Railway in the English county of Dorset. Opened in April 1909, it was sited at the north end of the bridge over Radipole Lake. The station was built to enable Portland branch passengers to go to Weymouth without the need for the branch train to reverse to enter Weymouth railway station. The branch junction was to the north of Weymouth station and faced Dorchester. The station was closed officially, along with the branch, on 3 March 1952. However, the station continued to be used for overflow from the adjacent Weymouth station, particularly on summer Saturdays: regularly until 12 September 1959 and irregularly for a while after that.

Operated by the Great Western Railway, the station was placed in the Western Region when the railways were nationalised in 1948.

Goods trains continued to pass the site on their way to the Admiralty sites on Portland until 1965.

== The site today ==
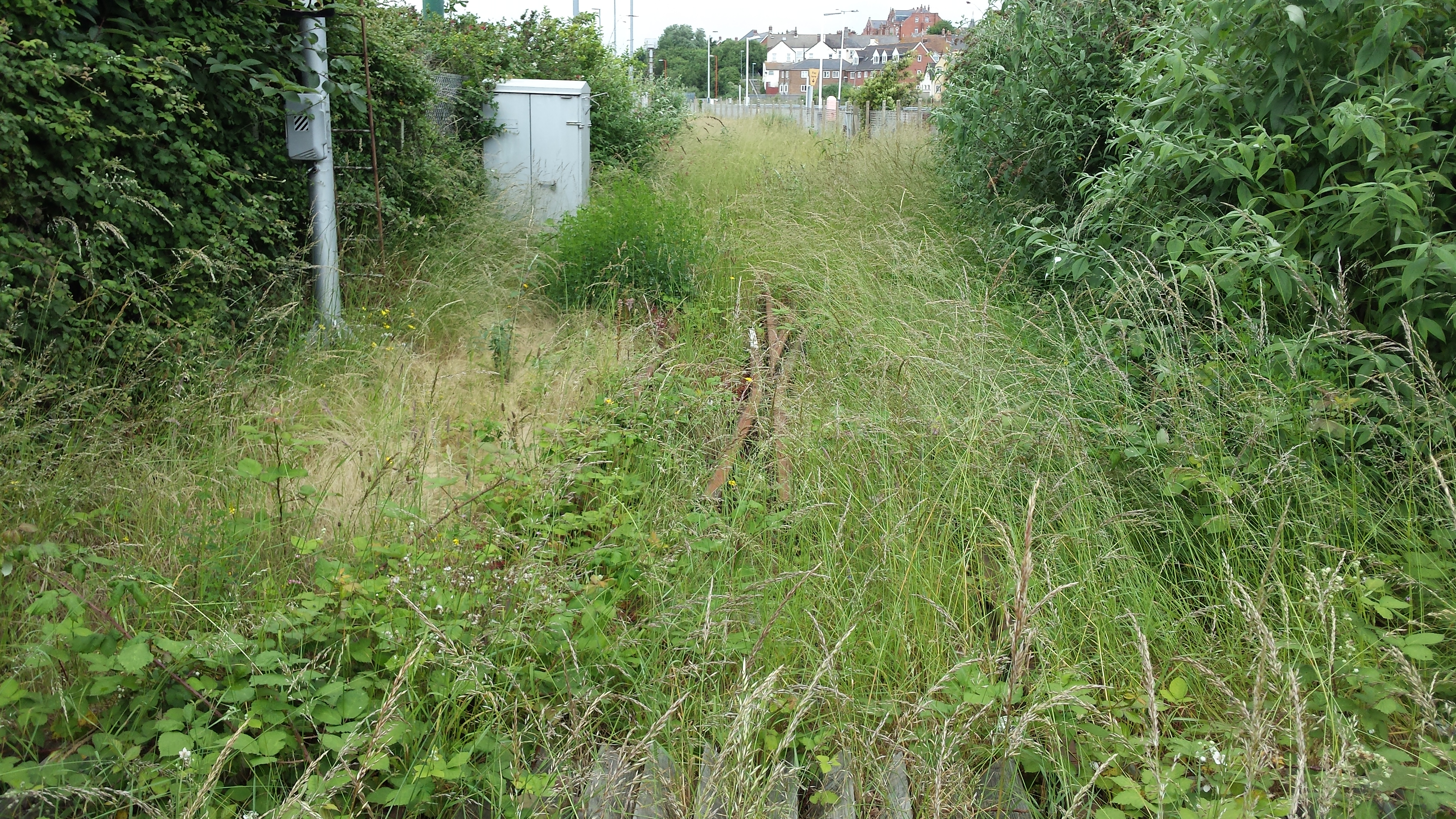
Site of the railway station, seen in 2016

The last remains were removed in 2000 and the site is now under the relief road at the north end of Swannery Bridge near a car park.

Preceding station	Disused railways	Following station
Terminus; Line and station closed Through trains Radipole or Weymouth (via reversal)	GWR and LSWR; Portland Branch Railway	Westham Halt; Line and station closed
