= Weymouth railway station =

Railway station in Dorset, England

Weymouth
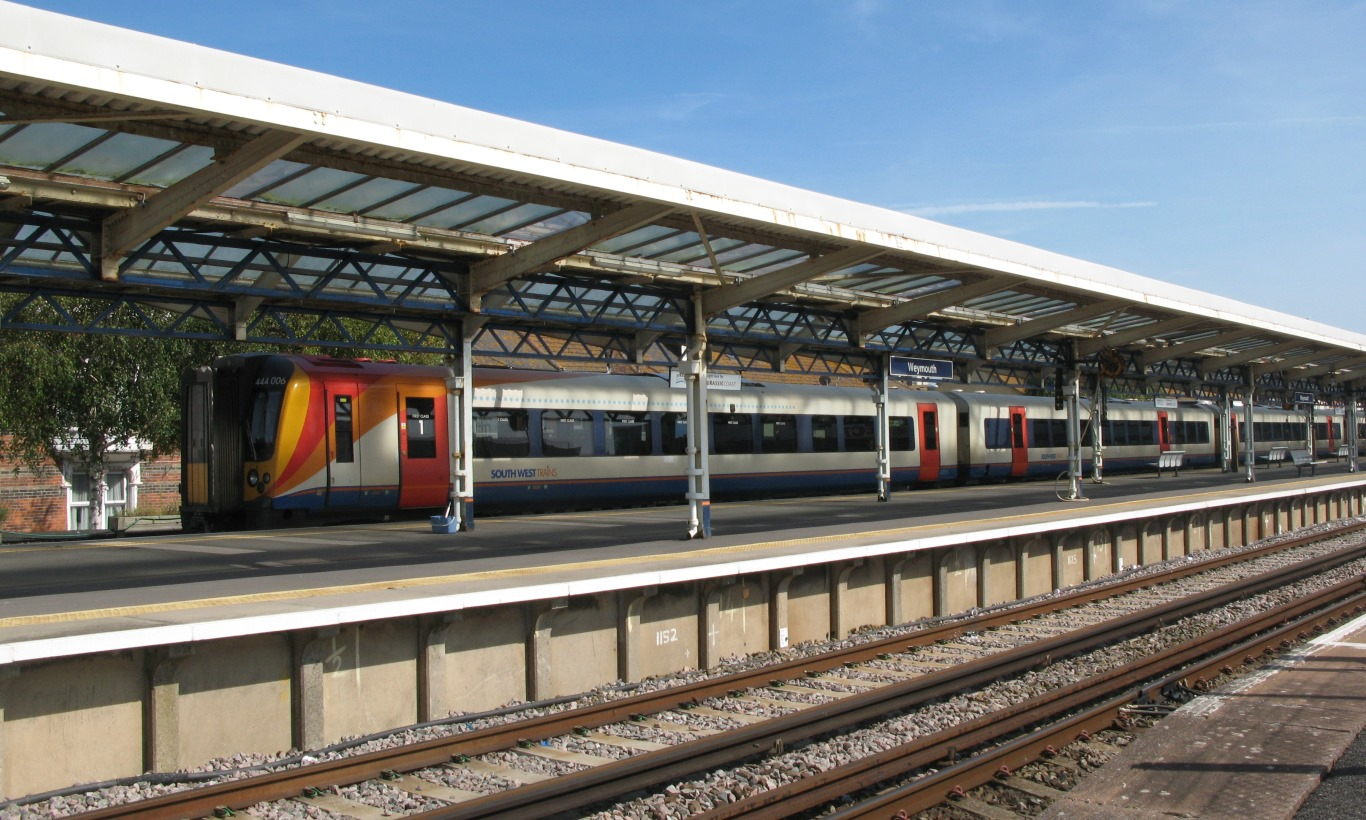

General information
- Location: Weymouth, Dorset; England
- Coordinates: 50.616°N 2.455°W
- Grid reference: SY679797
- Manager: South Western Railway
- Platforms: 3

Other information
- Station code: WEY
- Classification: DfT category C1

History
- Original company: Wilts, Somerset and Weymouth Railway
- Pre-grouping: Great Western Railway
- Post-grouping: Great Western Railway

Key dates
- 20 January 1857: Opened

Passengers
- 2020/21: ▼0.186 million
- Interchange: ▼1,378
- 2021/22: ▲0.544 million
- Interchange: ▲4,020
- 2022/23: ▲0.642 million
- Interchange: ▲6,596
- 2023/24: ▲0.687 million
- Interchange: ▲40,642
- 2024/25: ▲0.751 million
- Interchange: ▼28,590
Location
Notes
- Passenger statistics from the Office of Rail & Road

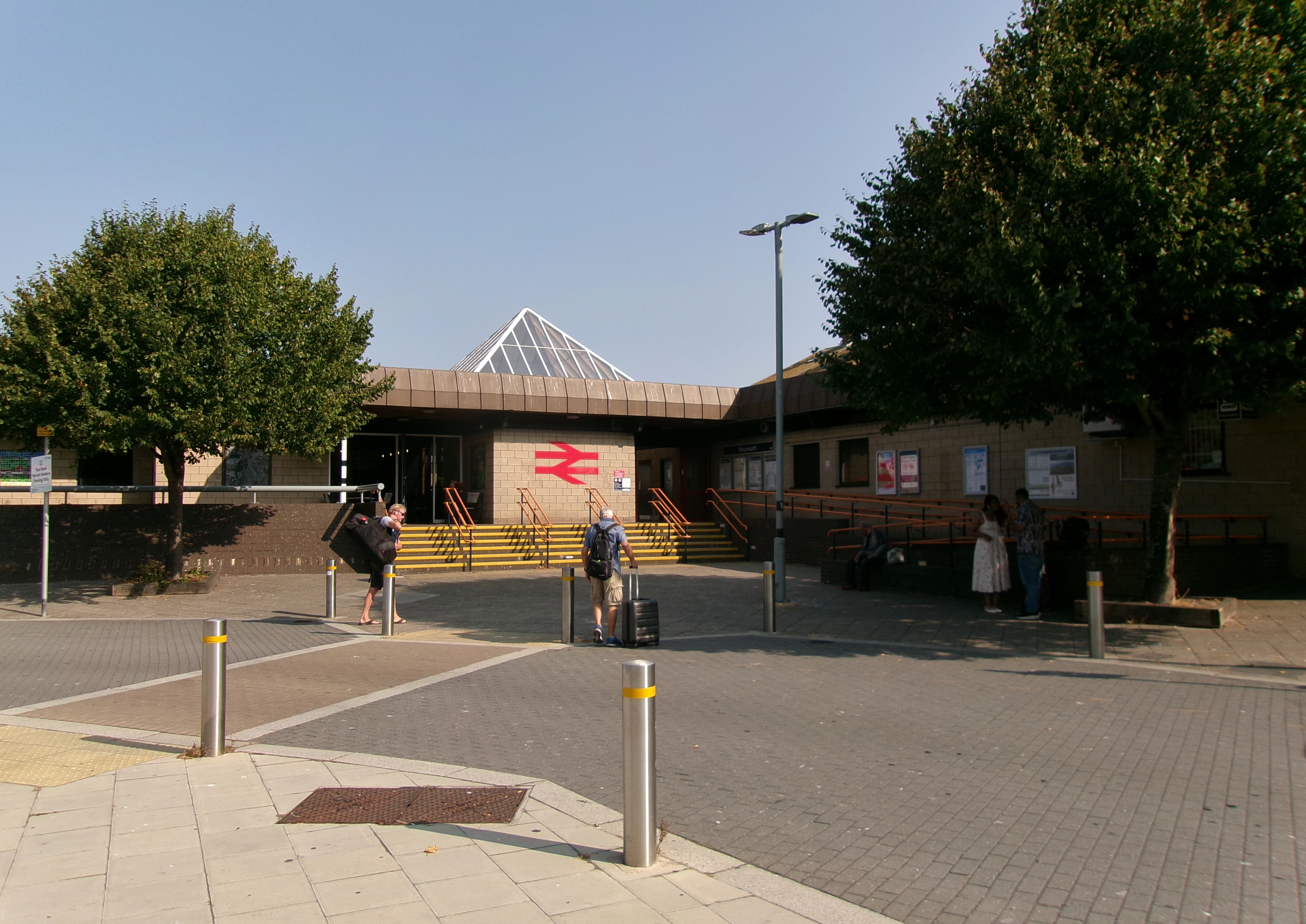
Station entrance

Weymouth is the main railway station serving the town of Weymouth, in Dorset, England; the other is at Upwey, which is located north of the town centre. It is the southern terminus of both the South West Main Line, 142 miles 64 chains (229.8 km) down the line from London Waterloo, and the Heart of Wessex Line from Bristol Temple Meads and Gloucester, 168 miles 63 chains (271.6 km) from London Paddington.

== History ==
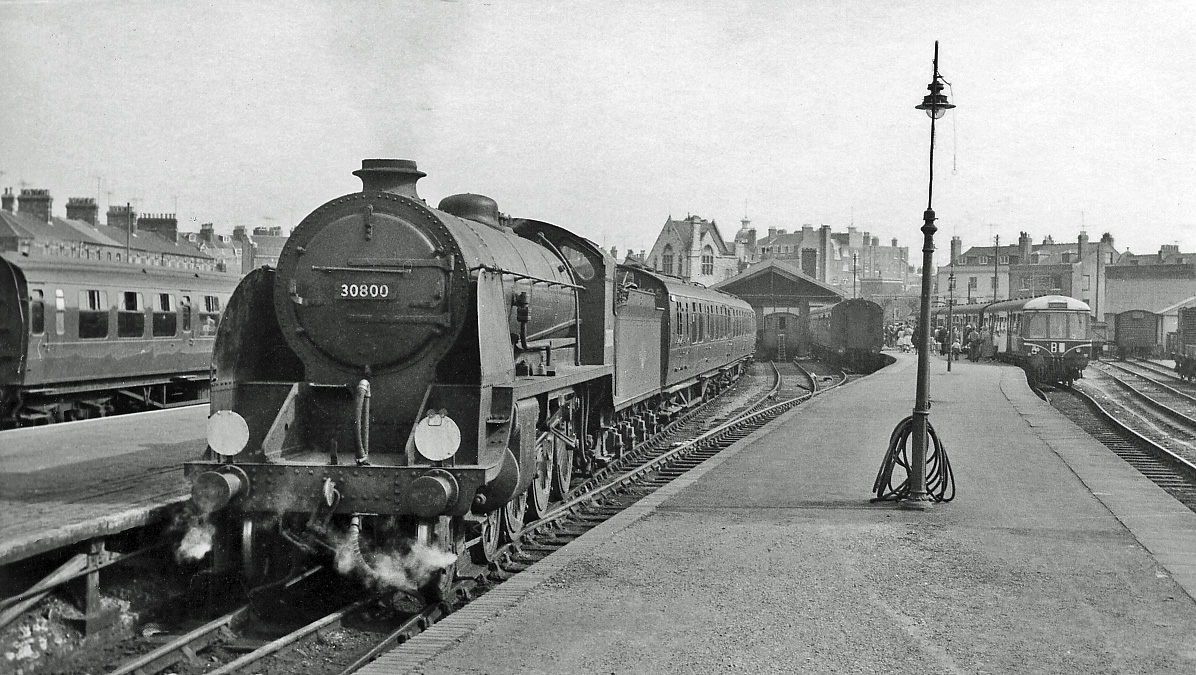
Express to Waterloo in 1960

The Wilts, Somerset and Weymouth Railway, which was authorised in 1845, was built in stages (during which the company was absorbed in 1850 by the Great Western Railway). Two of the last sections, from Yeovil Pen Mill to Weymouth and a connecting curve from that line to the Dorchester station of the London and South Western Railway (LSWR), were opened on 20 January 1857. The LSWR was granted running powers from Dorchester to Weymouth, where some of the platforms were dedicated for LSWR use; these powers were exercised from the opening day. The station was named Weymouth, although some timetables showed it as Weymouth Town. Branches to Portland and Weymouth Quay (both opened in 1865) ran from Weymouth Junction, just north of the station.

The original station buildings were designed by T. H. Bertram and constructed in timber with a glazed overall roof across the tracks; this was removed after WW2. By the turn of the century the station area comprised five platforms, a large goods yard, and a small LSWR engine shed; the GWR had a larger shed situated north of the station. Nearby, Melcombe Regis served Portland passenger trains until 1952 and provided an overflow platform for excursion trains on busy summer weekends until 1959.

After the Second World War, the station saw rapid growth in holiday and Channel Islands traffic. As a result, the station underwent a major expansion in the late 1950s, gaining two lengthy excursion platforms (which now serve today's station), additional sidings adjacent to Jubilee Gardens, and a new signal box to replace two older boxes. However traffic soon declined and the station was progressively rationalised after the end of steam-hauled operations in 1967 with the goods yard closing in 1972 and the signal box and most of the remaining sidings being taken out of use in 1987. Although the current station is a mere shadow of its former self, the extension of third-rail electrification from Bournemouth in 1988 has given the station much improved services to London.

The station and forecourt were reconstructed at a cost of £750,000 and formally opened on 3 July 1986 by the Mayor of Weymouth and Portland, Councillor David Hall, who unveiled a commemorative plaque in the ticket hall. The station, which was rebuilt in Network SouthEast livery, was provided with enhanced ticket office facilities, a travel centre, Red Star Parcels point and an improved car park. In its final years, the old Weymouth station was far too big for the traffic it was handling.

In 2022 the area outside the station was rebuilt. The work included the installation of a new bus stop.

=== Accidents and incidents ===
- On 4 August 1868, a passenger train collided with the buffer stops at Weymouth due to poor rail conditions and driver error. Six people were injured.

== Services ==
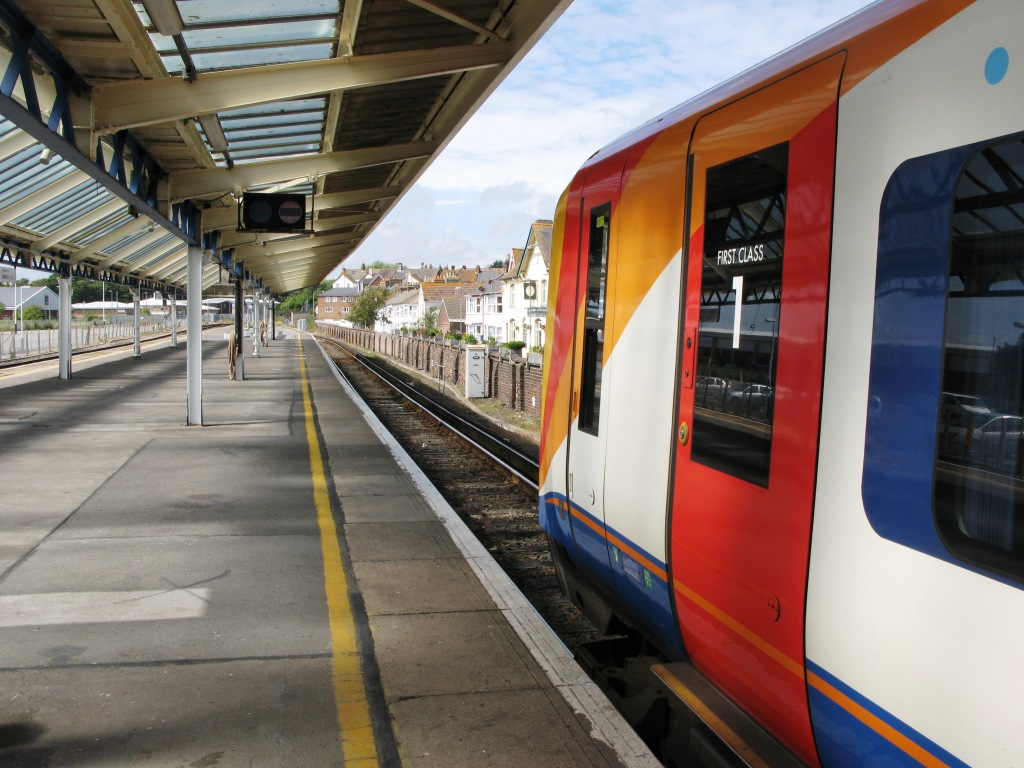
A train to London Waterloo awaits departure

Services at Weymouth are operated by two train operating companies:

- South Western Railway generally operates two trains per hour to London Waterloo. One of these is a stopping service calling at most stops to Winchester, then Basingstoke and Clapham Junction; the second is a semi-fast service calling at principal stations only to Winchester and then Woking. On Sundays, the service is reduced to hourly.
- Great Western Railway generally operates eight trains per day to Bristol Temple Meads, with a number of these continuing to Gloucester. On Sundays, this is reduced to between three and five trains per day depending on the time of year.

Preceding station	National Rail	Following station
Upwey or Dorchester South	South Western Railway South West Main Line	Terminus
Upwey	Great Western Railway Heart of Wessex Line	Terminus
	Disused railways	
Terminus	Great Western Railway Weymouth Harbour Tramway	Weymouth Quay (Reversal needed)
Terminus	GWR and LSWR Portland Branch Railway	Melcombe Regis
	Historical railways	
Radipole Line open, station closed	Great Western Railway Wilts, Somerset and Weymouth Railway	Terminus

== Weymouth Quay ==
Weymouth Quay railway station is a disused terminus in the town. Its passenger station was used solely for trains connecting with cross-channel ferries, which have not run since 1987. Its use had been suggested as part of the transport infrastructure for the 2012 Olympic sailing events to take place on the Isle of Portland, though since it is accessed via the Weymouth Harbour Tramway, which ran along public streets, this posed difficulties. Previously, the branch saw both freight and passenger traffic, most recently fuel-oil trains. The tracks through the streets were removed October-December 2020, save for a couple of short sections to show the former track alignment.

== Bibliography ==
- Butt, R.V.J. (1995). The Directory of Railway Stations. Yeovil: Patrick Stephens Ltd. ISBN 1-85260-508-1. R508.
- James, Leslie (November 1983). A Chronology of the Construction of Britain's Railways 1778-1855. Shepperton: Ian Allan Publishing. ISBN 0-7110-1277-6. BE/1183.
- MacDermot, E.T. (1927). History of the Great Western Railway, vol. I: 1833-1863. Paddington: Great Western Railway.
- Williams, R.A. (1968). The London & South Western Railway, volume 1: The Formative Years. Newton Abbot: David & Charles. ISBN 0-7153-4188-X.

This station offers access to the South West Coast Path
Distance to path	¼ mile (500 metres)
Next station anticlockwise	Swanage 48 miles (77 km)
Next station clockwise	Exmouth 76 miles (122 km)
