= Easton station =

Easton station may refer to:

- Easton station (Pennsylvania), a former station on the Lehigh Valley Railroad in the United States
- Easton railway station (England), a former station on the Isle of Portland in Dorset, United Kingdom
