= Easton railway station (England) =

Disused railway station in Dorset, England

Coordinates: 50.5454°N 2.4383°W

Easton
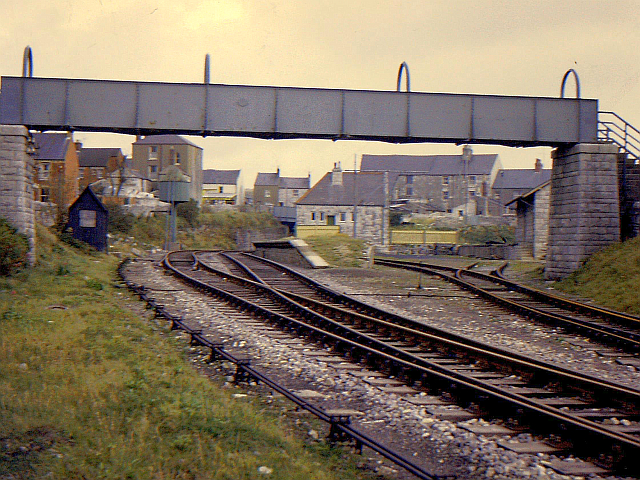
- Photograph of the approach to Easton Railway Station, in November 1962

General information
- Location: Isle of Portland, Dorset; England
- Platforms: 1

Other information
- Status: Disused

History
- Original company: Weymouth and Portland Railway
- Pre-grouping: Great Western Railway
- Post-grouping: Great Western Railway; British Railways (Southern Region)

Key dates
- 1 September 1901: Station opening
- 1952: Closed to passengers
- 1965: Closed to freight
Location

Easton railway station was the terminus of the Portland Branch Railway, which operated on the Isle of Portland in the south of the English county of Dorset.

== History ==
The station opened with the Easton and Church Hope Railway, one of the constituent parts of a complex line, on 1 September 1902. The line past Portland station was technically a separate railway, although the branch was operated as one line throughout. Easton was closed between 11 November 1940 and 1 January 1945 following air raid damage during the Second World War.

Although the station closed to passengers in 1952 regular freight kept the line in use until 1965. The station was demolished in the 1970s.

== The site today ==
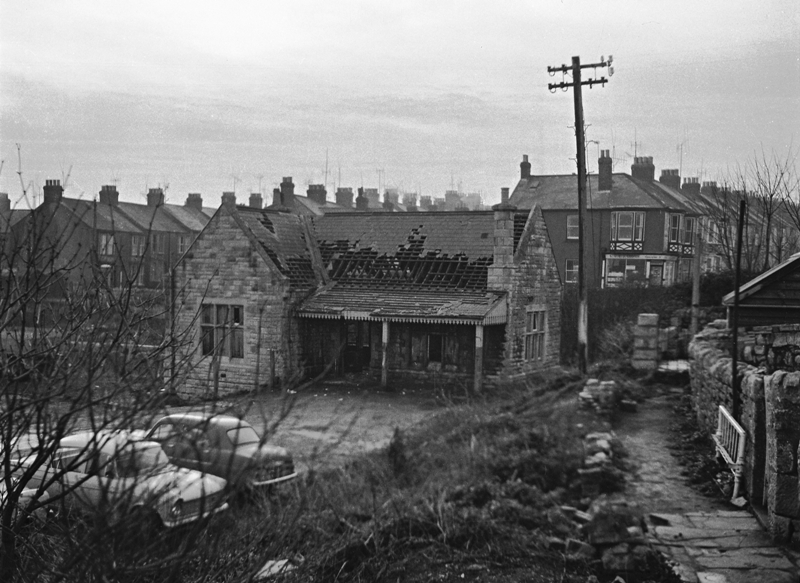
Derelict Easton station, Portland, Dorset, March 1970

The area is now the site of a residential home for the elderly.

Preceding station	Disused railways	Following station
Portland (Dorset); Line and station closed	GWR and LSWR; Portland Branch Railway	Terminus
