= St Paul's Church, Weymouth =

Church in Dorset, England

St Paul's Church
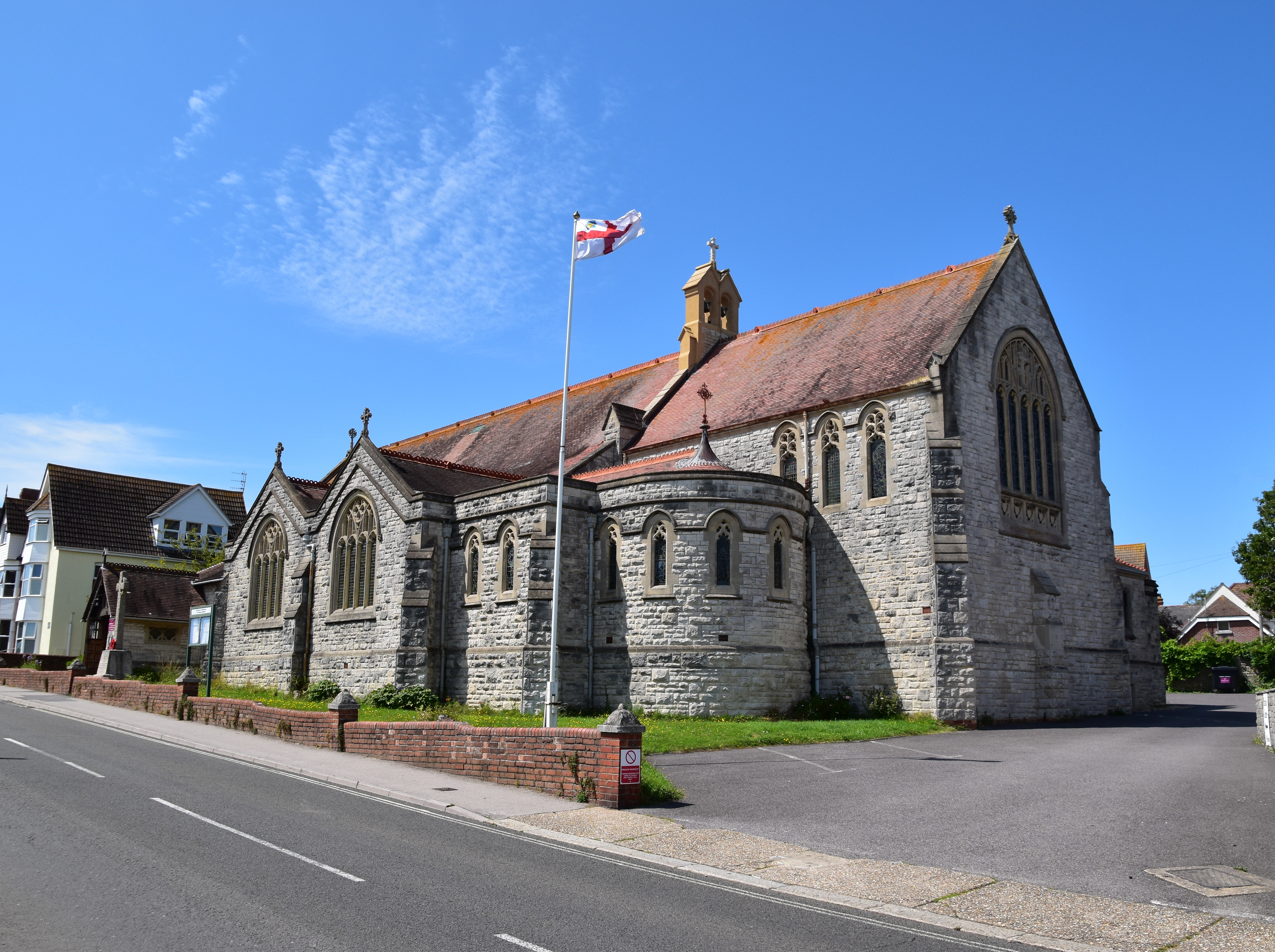

Religion
- Affiliation: Church of England
- Ecclesiastical or organizational status: Active
- Year consecrated: 1900

Location
- Location: Westham, Weymouth, Dorset, England
- Interactive map of St Paul's Church
- Coordinates: 50.6119°N 2.4649°W

Architecture
- Architect: George Fellowes Prynne
- Type: Church

St Paul's Church is a Church of England parish church in Westham, Weymouth, Dorset, England. Designed by George Fellowes Prynne, the bulk of the church was built in 1894–96. It has been a Grade II listed building since 1974, with the World War I memorial outside also designated Grade II in 2016. In their book The Buildings of England: Dorset, John Newman and Nikolaus Pevsner noted the church's "idiosyncratic but convincing design".

== History ==
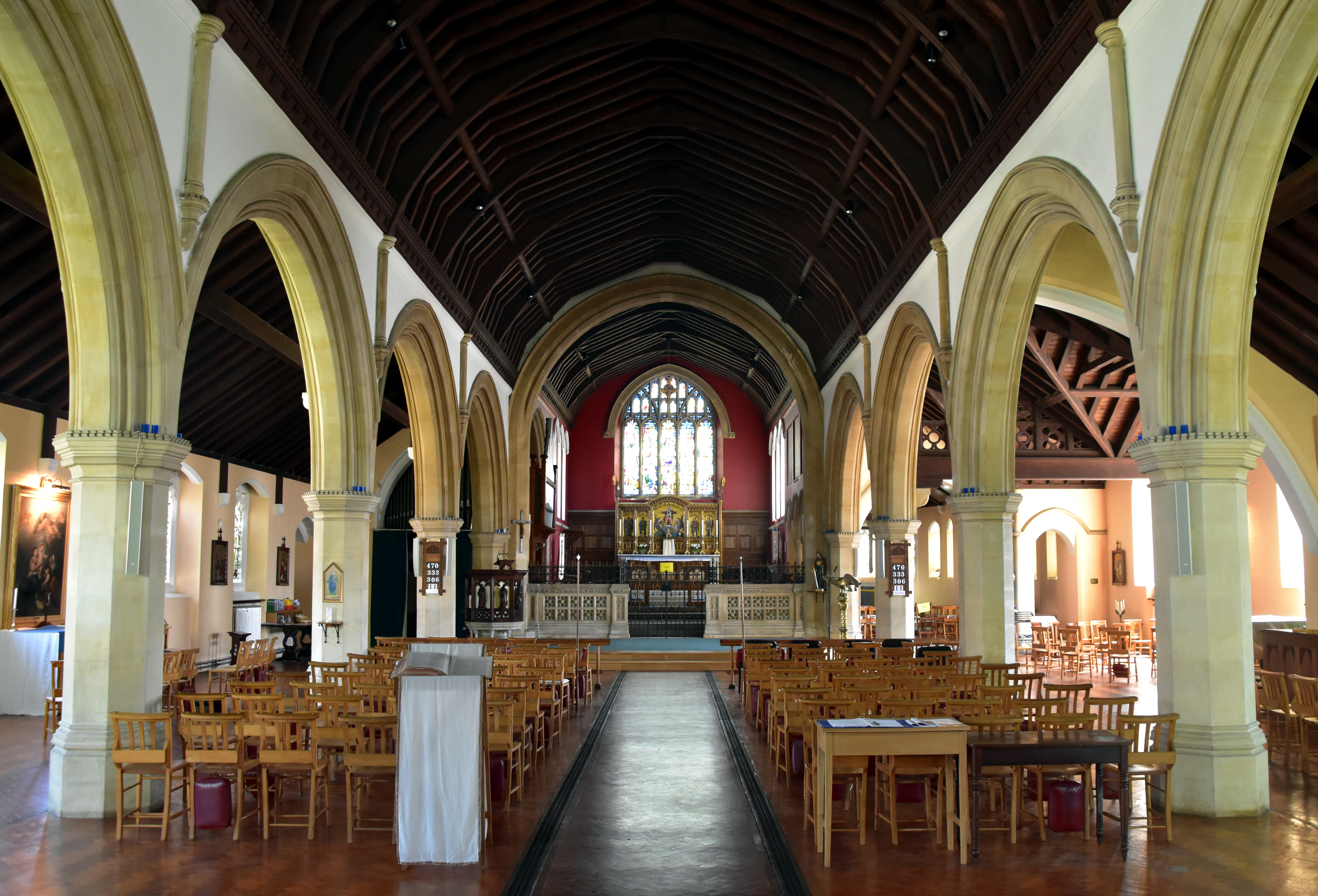
The interior of St Paul's Church.

St Paul's was built to serve the residents of Westham, which developed as a new suburb of Weymouth in the late 19th century. A chapel of ease to All Saints was first erected to serve Westham in 1880. By 1892, the suburb's population had passed 2,000 and the existing church accommodation became inadequate. A meeting was held at Weymouth Guildhall in June 1892, chaired by the Bishop of Salisbury, which determined that a new church should be erected. A committee was formed to raise funds and a site opposite the church purchased for £655. In 1893, a limited competition was held for architects to send their designs for the church and that of George Fellowes Prynne was selected in favour of two other schemes.

Enough funds had been raised to allow construction to begin in 1894, with Mr. W. H. Gooding of Exeter hired as the builder and Mr. R. Ramm as clerk of the works. The foundation stone was laid by the Countess of Hoyos on 9 May 1894. The ceremony was attended by the Bishop of Salisbury, the Weymouth Mayor and Corporation, members of the local clergy and the public. As further funds were required before the entire church could be built, the initial agreement was for enough of the building to be built to provide accommodation for 400 persons. As work progressed, problems emerged with the contractor when it was realised the church could not be completed by the time specified and contracted for. Work was temporarily halted but recommenced when Prynne took over the project himself, with Mr. C. Foad as clerk of the works.

The contracted work was completed in 1896 and St Paul's was dedicated by the Bishop of Salisbury, the Right Rev. John Wordsworth, on 25 January 1896. It included two bays of the nave, north aisle, south transept, chancel, vestries and organ chamber, along with the permanent foundation of the whole church. A third bay of the nave, at the west end, was also erected as a temporary section. At the time, £5,600 had been spent on the church and land, £1,850 of which had still to be raised. In the following years, the committee continued to raise funds and the debt was reduced to £600 by 1900.

In May 1900, a meeting was held at the Royal Hotel in Weymouth to discuss the proposed consecration of the church and the formation of a separate parish from Wyke Regis. The Bishop of Salisbury offered to consecrate the church on 18 October 1900 if the debt was reduced to £300 by the beginning of that month and if the architect of the Ecclesiastical Commissioners certified St Paul's "structurally sufficient" as a parish church. £450 was successfully raised and the Bishop of Salisbury consecrated the church on 18 October 1900. Westham became its own parish, with St Paul's as the parish church, in 1902. A side chapel was added to the church in 1903 and all permanent work completed in 1913.
