= Rodwell =

Rodwell, a name of Old English origin, is a locational surname deriving from any one of various places in Bedfordshire, Hertfordshire, and Kent, England.In English, the meaning of the name Rodwell is "lives by the spring near the road". Notable people and characters with the name include:

== Surname ==
- Benjamin Hunter-Rodwell, British lawyer and Conservative politician
- Brett Rodwell, Australian rugby league footballer
- Sir Cecil Hunter-Rodwell, British colonial administrator and Governor
- Charles Rodwell (born 1996), British-born French politician
- Craig Rodwell, American gay rights activist and founder of the first gay bookstore
- Emerson Rodwell, Australian soldier, cricket player, umpire, commentator and administrator
- Eric Rodwell, American bridge player
- George Herbert Buonaparte Rodwell, English composer, musical director, and author
- Jack Rodwell, English footballer
- James Rodwell, English rugby union sevens player
- Jim Rodwell, English footballer and former chairman of Boston United
- John Medows Rodwell, English translator of the Koran
- John S. Rodwell, British ecologist based at the University of Lancaster
- Lindy Rodwell, South African zoologist and conservationist
- Matt Rodwell, Australian rugby league footballer
- Roger de Rodwell, English medieval university chancellor
- Sally Rodwell (1950–2006), New Zealand multi-disciplinary artist
- Tony Rodwell, English footballer
- Warren Rodwell, former soldier, university teacher, hostage survivor and songwriter
- Warwick Rodwell, English author, archaeologist, architectural historian and academic

=== In fiction ===
- Andrew Rodwell, a fictional character from the Australia soap opera Neighbours
- Michael Marlon Rodwell, character in Coronation Street played by Les Dennis
- Gail Rodwell, a fictional character from the soap opera Coronation Street
- Lord Rodwell Stark, in American TV series Game of Thrones
- Michael Rodwell, a fictional character from the soap opera Coronation Street
- Sadie Rodwell, a fictional character from the Australia soap opera Neighbours
- Wendy Rodwell, a fictional character from the Australia soap opera Neighbours

=== Hyphenated name ===
- Verna L. Jones-Rodwell, American politician
- Caitlin O'Connell-Rodwell, American scientific consultant, author, co-founder and CEO of Utopia Scientific, elephant expert

== First name ==
- Rodwell Ferguson, Belizean politician
- Rodwell Makoto, Zimbabwean chess international master
- Rodwell Munyenyembe, Malawi politician
- Rodwell Williams, Belizean lawyer
