= Westham, Dorset =

Suburb of Weymouth, Dorset, England

Coordinates: 50°36′43″N 2°28′12″W

Westham
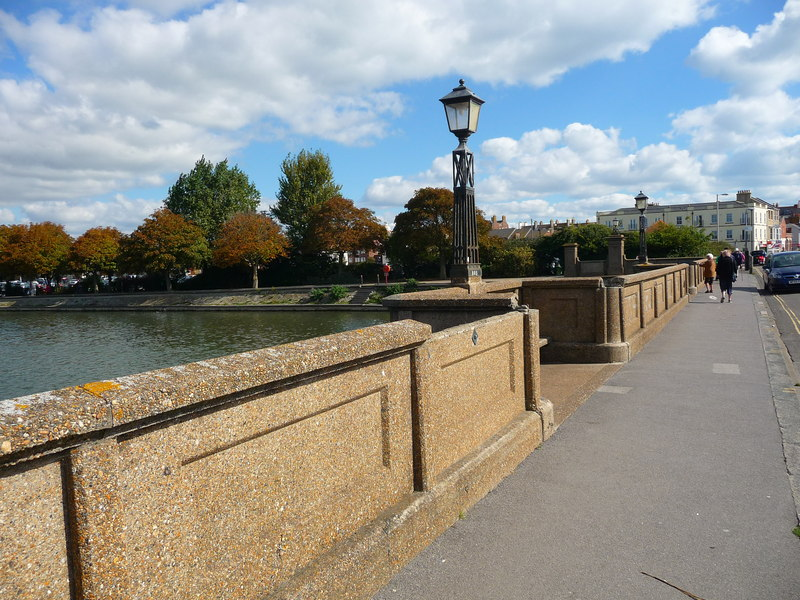
- Westham Bridge

- Location within Dorset
- Civil parish: Weymouth
- Unitary authority: Dorset
- Ceremonial county: Dorset
- Region: South West
- Country: England
- Sovereign state: United Kingdom
- Post town: Weymouth
- Postcode district: DT4
- Dialling code: 01305
- Police: Dorset
- Fire: Dorset and Wiltshire
- Ambulance: South Western
- UK Parliament: South Dorset

Westham is a suburb of Weymouth, Dorset, England.

== History ==
Westham was established as a new suburb of Weymouth from the early 1880s. In 1880, the largely undeveloped Abbotsbury Road, along which Westham was centred, saw the construction of a number of residential properties, a chapel of ease, a schoolhouse and a steam laundry operated by the Weymouth Sanitary Steam Laundry Ltd. The name Westham was decided upon during a meeting of "owners and holders of property in the district", held on 15 September 1882 at the Rock Hotel.

There were approximately 550 inhabitants in 1882 and this had increased to over 2,000 in 1892. The population in 2021 was 9,393.

Westham Bridge was opened in 1921. In 2021, Westham Bridge Cycle Shelter was removed.

== Politics ==
The Westham ward elects members to Dorset Council.

== Buildings ==
- St Paul's Church, Weymouth
- Westham Halt railway station
