= Rodwell Trail =

Footpath in England

Coordinates: 50.593°N 2.477°W

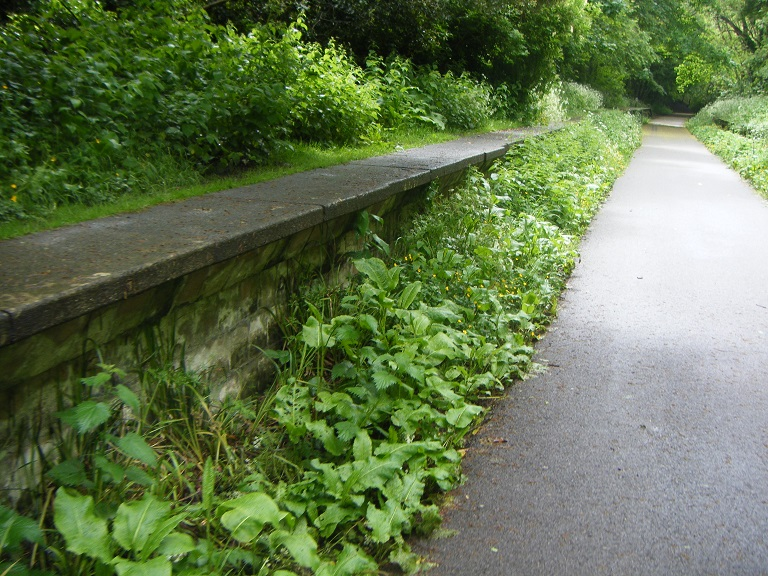
Rodwell Station Platform

The Rodwell Trail is a short-distance footpath that runs from Wyke Regis to the town centre of Weymouth in Dorset – a distance of 2¼ miles (3.5 kilometres). The trail, opened in 2000, travels along the former route of the Weymouth and Portland Railway. The section from near Sandsfoot Castle to Ferry Bridge is part of the South West Coast Path. The route follows part of the Jurassic Coast, and Sites of Special Scientific Interest. It is named after a neighbourhood of Weymouth which it passes through.

The trail is popular with pedestrians, cyclists and dog walkers. Maintenance of the trail is carried out by the Friends of Rodwell Trail group, who carry out litter picks and clear overgrowth on the route. Their work has been promoted by local publications such as the Dorset Echo.

== Route ==
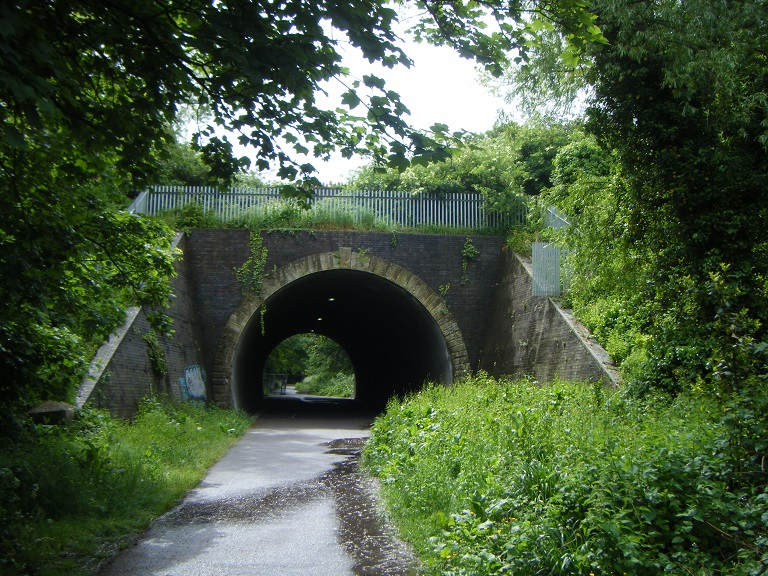
Rodwell Tunnel leading to Rodwell Station

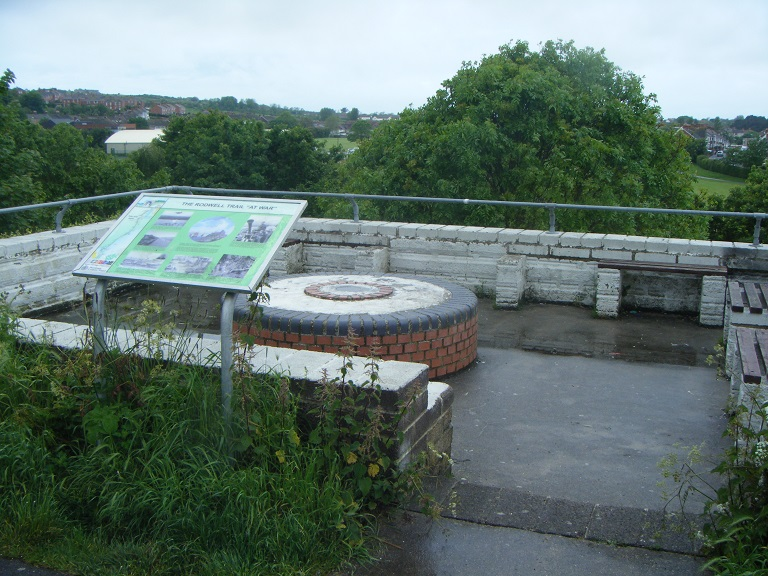
World War II gun emplacement, now a viewing platform.

The trail starts on Abbotsbury Road in Westham, Weymouth and ends at Ferrybridge in Wyke Regis. The latter part of the trail is along the northern side of Portland Harbour, passing the Tudor Sandsfoot Castle. The Rodwell Trail travels along the former route of the Weymouth and Portland Railway, which was constructed in 1865 to carry passengers and Portland stone between the two settlements. In 1891 it would be extended to serve Whitehead's Torpedo Factory at Wyke Regis (within close proximity of where the trail ends). In 1870 the first intermediate station at Rodwell was opened and later improved in 1908, with a new passing loop, platform and signal box. The line's use was improved further in 1909 when new halts were added at Westham and Wyke Regis, and again in 1932 with a stop at Sandsfoot Castle Halt. The railway closed on 9 April 1965. Along the route, the remains of the station platforms, and other relics, including tunnels can be seen as a reminder of the railway. The signboards of each station halt are not original, but label each original stop.

Within the Westham area of the trail, a World War II light anti-aircraft gun emplacement built into the railway embankment was refurbished in recent years to provide a viewing platform across Weymouth and to act as a reminder of Weymouth's defence during the war largely on account of the naval base at Portland. The stone structured emplacement would have given low-level defence to Weymouth and Portland harbours. The mounting gun ring still remains, and this would have held a 40 mm Bofors Gun. The dividing partitions surrounding the ring, still survive, which would have been ready-use ammunition lockers and general equipment storage cupboards, as does the rooms below that are reached by a set of steps on the southern side of the emplacement.

An extension of the trail further along the old railway line was proposed as a means of access to the Weymouth and Portland National Sailing Academy during the 2012 Olympic Games. Following a £900,000 investment, £350,000 of which was contributed by the Big Lottery funded Sustrans "Connect2" initiative in 2012, a missing link in the trail was reconnected and installed.

The Rodwell Trail featured on the BBC factual programme Railway Walks presented by Julia Bradbury, which was first broadcast on BBC Four in October 2008, and repeated on BBC Two in April 2009. Portland's Merchant's Railway was also featured on the programme as a continuation of the same walk. The walk was included in the book accompanying the series.

== Wildlife ==
The trail is a haven for various wildlife, and forms a green lung linking Ferry Bridge with the RSPB Radipole Lake wildlife reserve. The route often features many species of birds, including kingfishers, redwings and great crested grebes. A range of insects, rodents, mammals such as foxes and badgers, as well as lizards and frogs can also be seen. Plant life includes foxgloves, bluebells and meadow buttercups. Abbotsbury Road often has hedge sparrows and blackbirds in the hedges, along with garden spiders and great green bush crickets. Serotine bats and pipistrelle bats have also been seen around this area. To the south of Wyke Tunnel, the damp environment has spawned pendulous sedge and hart's tongue ferns. Common frogs and blackcaps are found within this area, as well as foxes and badgers. The Buxton Road Bridge region often has many species of a butterfly during the summer, including red admiral, comma, and holly blue. Mice may also be spotted within the area. Between Sandsfoot and Wyke Halts, various wildlife from common lizards to the common blue butterfly are often found. Amongst the reeds are wasp spiders and the rare Bithyinian vetch and little robin plants. At the Sandsfoot Gardens, the vantage spot over Portland Harbour is popular for seeing overwintering birds such as the great northern diver, Slavonian grebes, and mergansers.
