= Portland Branch Railway =

Disused railway line in Dorset, England

The Portland Branch railway refers to a group of lines on the Isle of Portland in the English county of Dorset. The first was the Portland Railway, a tramway with a counterbalanced rope-worked incline. It opened in 1826. It was followed by the Weymouth and Portland Railway, which connected to the main line of the Great Western Railway at Weymouth. It opened in 1865. From the late 1840s until 1872, Portland Breakwater was built, a prodigious construction task that created a very large safe harbour. It was decided to provide a railway connection to the breakwater, which was used as a pier for bunkering ships. This was constructed by the LSWR and the GWR jointly and opened in 1876. The fourth line was the Easton and Church Hope Railway. This line was conceived as a simple descent to bring stone down from quarries to a new jetty at Church Ope, but after their line was authorised in 1867, the Company delayed useful construction, and a change of plan followed, with several acts of Parliament authorising modifications to the route and extension of time. It finally opened in 1900.

The Weymouth and Portland Railway and the Easton and Church Hope Railway were operated jointly by the Great Western Railway and the LSWR. As far as Portland, the line was well used, but the onward section to Easton was disappointing commercially, and the E&CHR company, which owned the infrastructure, fell into receivership. The entire line closed to passengers in 1952 and completely in 1965. There is no railway activity on the former route now.

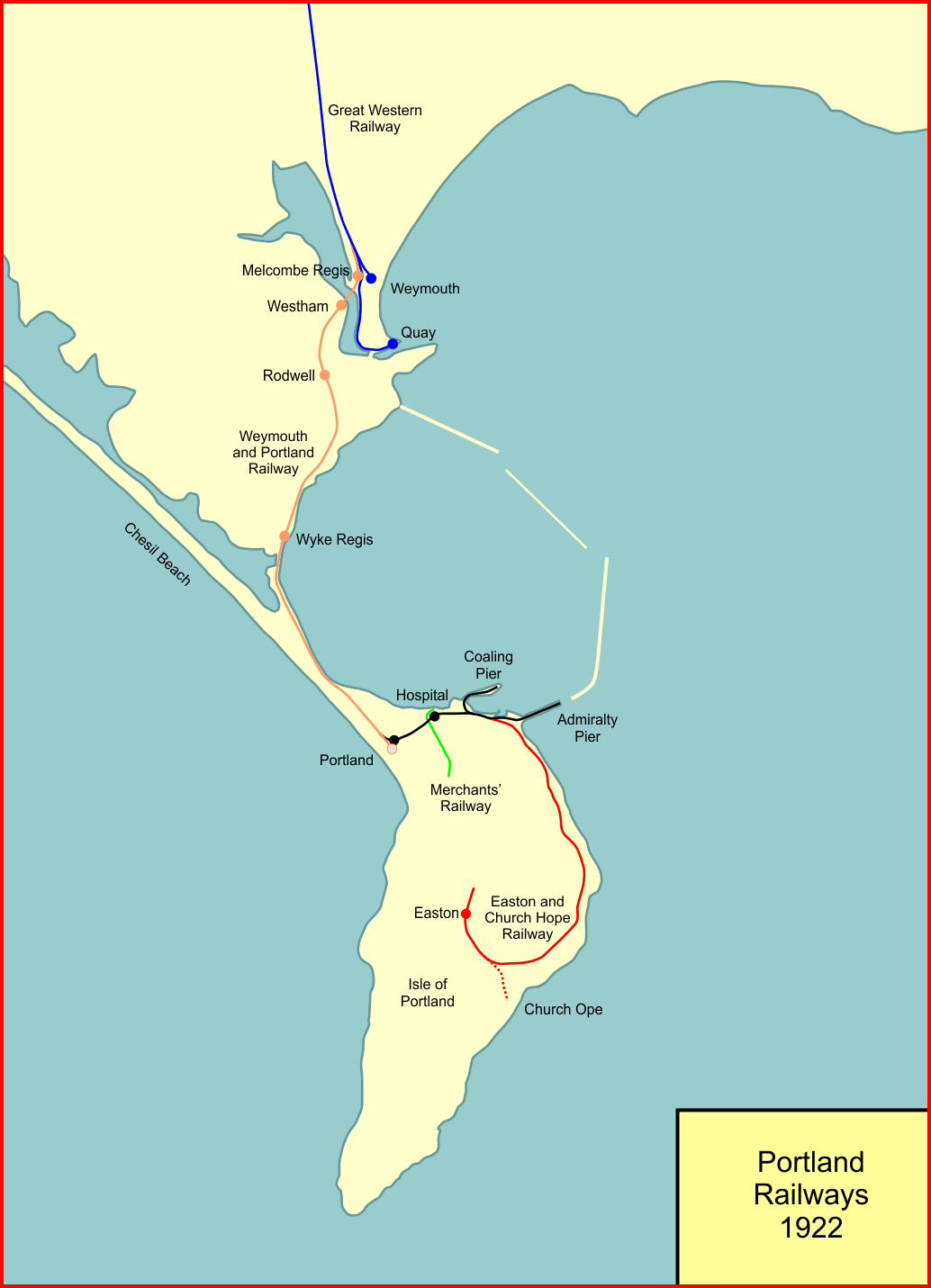
Isle of Portland railways in 1922

== Portland Railway: an early tramway ==
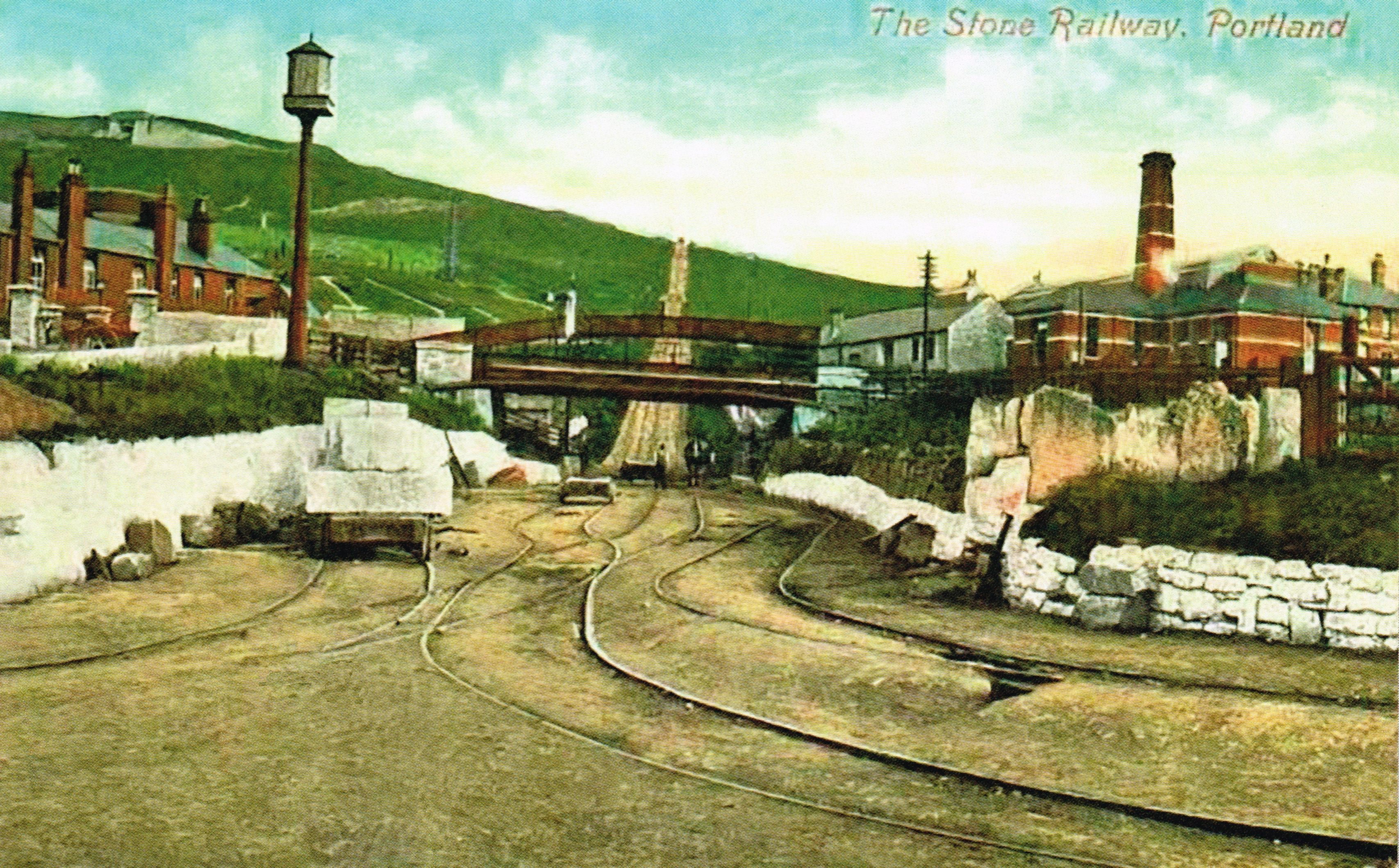
Portland Railway incline from Castleton

The Isle of Portland is rich in excellent-quality limestone, that was considered ideal for the construction of public buildings. It was desirable because it was durable, easy to work, and pleasing in colour. In the early nineteenth century, transport to cities where it was required was by coastal shipping.

Portland Railway Act 1825
- Act of Parliament
- Parliament of the United Kingdom
- Long title: An Act for making and maintaining a Railway or Tram Road, in the Parish of Saint George, in the Island of Portland, in the County of Dorset.
- Citation: 6 Geo. 4. c. cxxi

Dates
- Royal assent: 10 June 1825

Text of statute as originally enacted

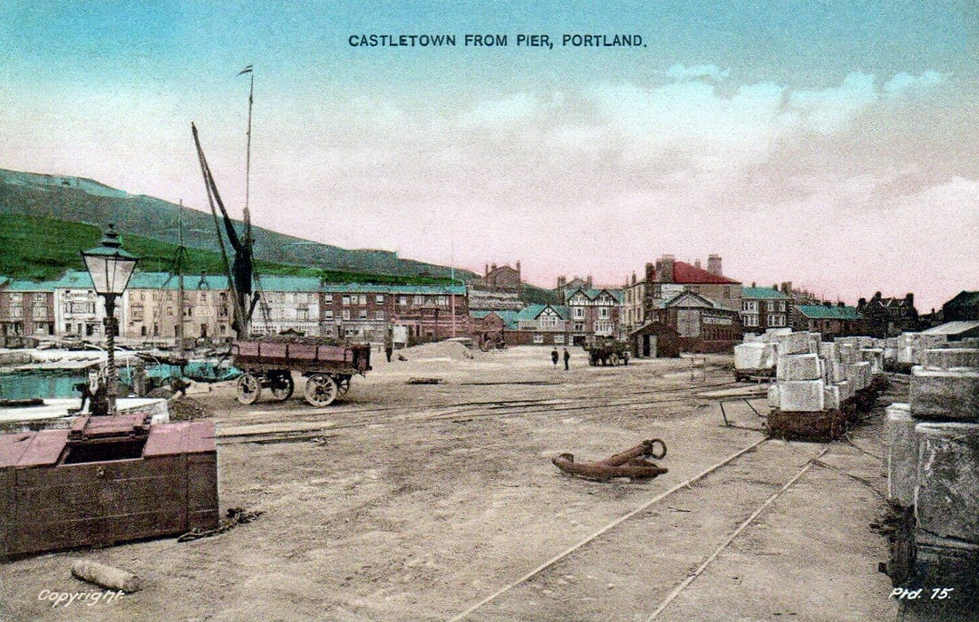
Castletown, Isle of Portland, quarry stone

Much of the actual quarrying took place at high points on the Island, and getting the heavy material down to a quayside was a considerable task. In the early 1820s, this led to a tramway being promoted by interested parties, and the Portland Railway was incorporated by an act of Parliament, the Portland Railway Act 1825 (6 Geo. 4. c. cxxi) of 10 June 1825. It was also known informally as the Merchants' Railway or the Freeman's Incline. It consisted of a horse-drawn tramway from what is now Priory Corner and a counterbalanced incline 586 yards (536m) in length descending to sea level near Portland Castle. From there, a further horse-worked section led to Castletown Pier. (Note: The railway always referred to the location as Castleton, without the w.) It had a track gauge of 4ft 6in (1,372mm), and it opened in October 1826.

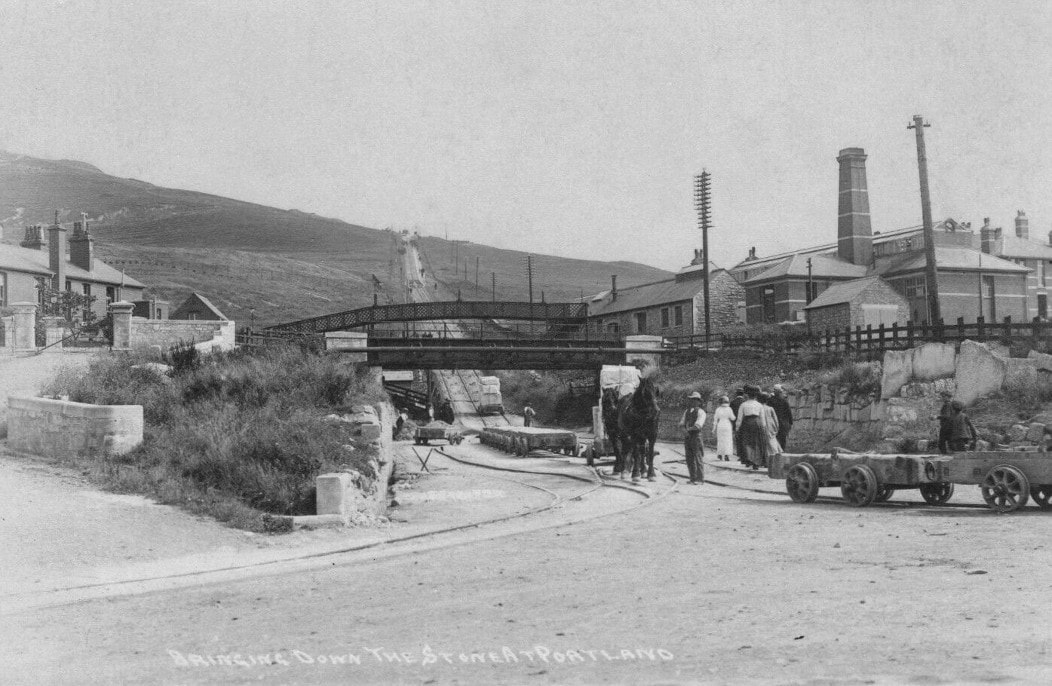
The Merchants' Railway from Castletown

As it was paid for by the quarry operators who used it, its income was rather haphazard, although the public may have been allowed to use it. Maintenance was not carried out diligently on the track and the cable system, and stoppages due to breakdowns were common. Notwithstanding continual difficulties, the line continued into the twentieth century. Traffic then declined, and the First World War effectively stopped the demand for the stone, and the line ceased operation on 17 June 1917. It reopened on 12 January 1920, and business was rather buoyant once again, but the outbreak of World War II indicated the end of operation, and the line closed again, this time permanently, on 11 October 1939.

== Weymouth and Portland Railway ==
=== Main lines at Weymouth ===
By the middle decades of the nineteenth century, Weymouth developed considerably as a seaside holiday resort. The broad gauge Great Western Railway had taken over the incomplete Wilts, Somerset and Weymouth Railway and opened a line from near Chippenham to Weymouth on 20 January 1857. The London and South Western Railway had reached Dorchester with the aid of the Southampton and Dorchester Railway, and an act of Parliament had given it running powers from Dorchester to Weymouth over the GWR line. As a broad gauge line, the GWR had been compelled to lay mixed gauge track from Dorchester, where the two routes converged, for the convenience of the LSWR.

=== Construction ===
Weymouth and Portland Railway Act 1862
- Act of Parliament
- Parliament of the United Kingdom
- Long title: An Act to authorize the Construction of a Railway from Weymouth, to the Isle of Portland, and to extend the Wilts, Somerset, and Weymouth Railway to the Harbour.
- Citation: 25 & 26 Vict. c. lxxi

Dates
- Royal assent: 30 June 1862

Because of the quarrying activity, a railway into Portland was agreed to be desirable, although there was some opposition, but the Weymouth and Portland Railway got an authorising act of Parliament, the Weymouth and Portland Railway Act 1862 (25 & 26 Vict. c. lxxi) on 30 June 1862. It was to be made on the mixed gauge, from a junction with the GWR line a short distance north of Weymouth station, to a terminus at Portland. The extent of line authorised was 4m 17ch (6.6km) for the main line, 34 chains (274m) for a tramway at Portland, and 1 mile 4 chains (1.93km) for a tramway "to the harbour", which referred to Weymouth Harbour. Authorised share capital was £75,000.

Work progressed and when the line was thought to be ready for opening, Col. Yolland made the Board of Trade inspection on 19 May 1864. In his report he stated that the track was of Vignoles (flat-bottom) rails spiked directly to transverse sleepers. There were two multiple-span viaducts, Backwater and Fleet, and Yolland said:

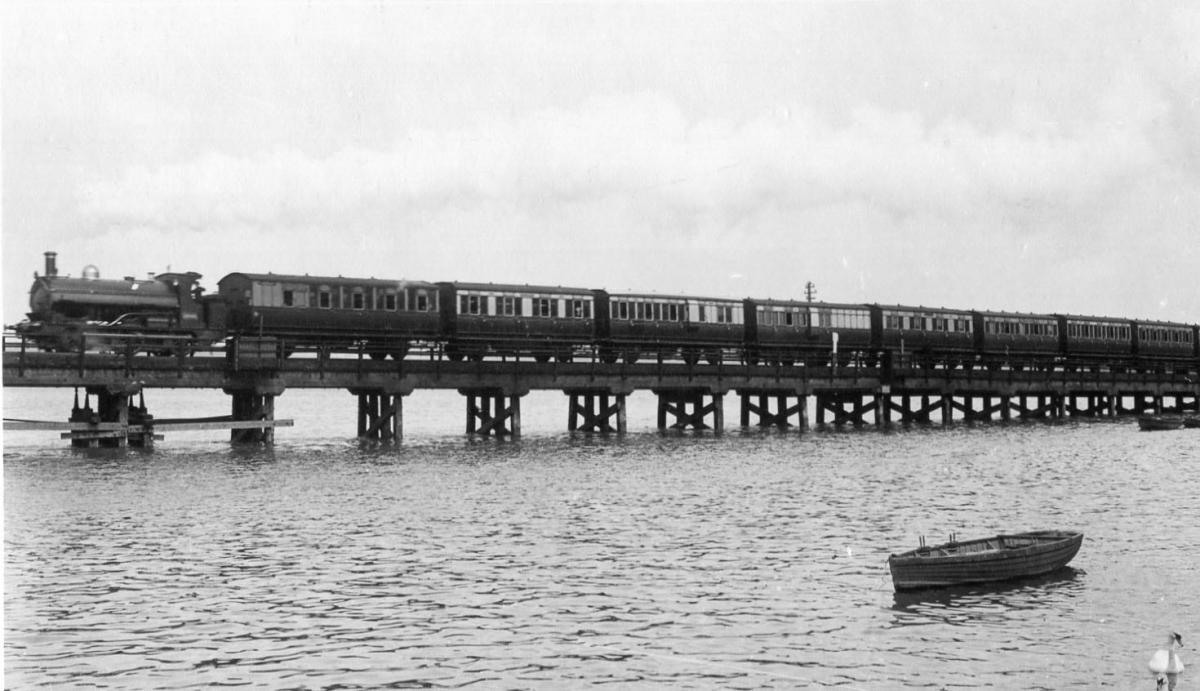
A train on the Small Mouth Viaduct

The viaducts are entirely of wood with openings mostly from 20 to 22 feet [6.1 to 6.7m] and they are both very unsatisfactory structures... The calculated breaking weight of one of these beams is about 11.5 tons but it is very uncertain what weight one of the half baulks would carry. It is quite certain that they are much too weak, that the workmanship is not good; and sufficient care not being exercised defective pieces of timber have been made use of. It is very doubtful whether these viaducts will not require to be entirely reconstructed and it is not clear whether the piles will not give under the weight of an engine.

He went on

A Joint Committee [of the GWR and LSWR] is to be appointed to regulate the working... over the line but this has not yet been done so that it is uncertain in what manner it is proposed to work the traffic. The junction with the Wilts Somerset and Weymouth is made nearly a quarter of a mile (402m) north of the Weymouth station while on the deposited plans the distance does not exceed 200 yards (183m). Every train arriving at or departing from the Weymouth station for Portland will therefore require to be shunted over the long distance. This is an objectionable and dangerous practice... [There was no proper signalbox at Weymouth Junction, so] The signals at the junction with the Wilts Somerset and Weymouth railway require to be brought together on a properly covered-in stage at the junction – the signals to have the locking apparatus.

Some of the work was attended to and Yolland paid another visit on 6 August 1864. He found that although some strengthening of the viaducts had been attempted, little else had been rectified, and no solution had been proposed to the dangerous reversal of trains from Weymouth Junction to the station.

As time went on with no progress, it became plain that the local company expected the Great Western Railway to assent to the use of the Weymouth station without payment. This had never been negotiated, nor suggested at the time of getting the act of Parliament. The LSWR objected to the arrangement as well, fearing that there would be insufficient accommodation for their own trains at Weymouth station. A request by the Weymouth and Portland company that its line might be operated by GWR broad gauge trains only was objected to by the Board of Trade: the line was authorised as a mixed gauge operation.

The issue was now put to arbitration under Captain Galton. He adjudicated that the Weymouth & Portland company could use Weymouth GWR station and pay them £2,600 for the accommodation provided, and £3,175 for land and works arranged by the GWR at the junction.

=== Open to traffic ===
In September 1865 an agreement was finally settled, and early in October the Board of Trade approved the working arrangements. So far as the propelling from Weymouth was concerned, the resolution appears to have been that the train engine ran round at Weymouth Junction, hauling its train to and from that point. Goods traffic started working on 9 October, and on 16 October 1865 passenger trains started running. The first day's receipts amounted to £26.

Eleven trains ran each way except Sundays when four operated. After a few weeks this was reduced to eight and three respectively. The passenger service was run entirely by the LSWR at first, and this continued for some considerable time. The GWR worked the goods traffic, although occasionally narrow (standard) gauge goods wagons were attached to LSWR passenger trains. A new station at Rodwell was opened on 1 June 1870. The signals at Portland were of the Stevens Patent lattice type, but at Weymouth Junction they were of the GWR disc and crossbar type.

The Great Western Railway route at Weymouth was converted to narrow (standard) gauge between 18 and 22 June 1874, of course affecting the Portland line also.

== Portland harbour breakwater and Admiralty line ==
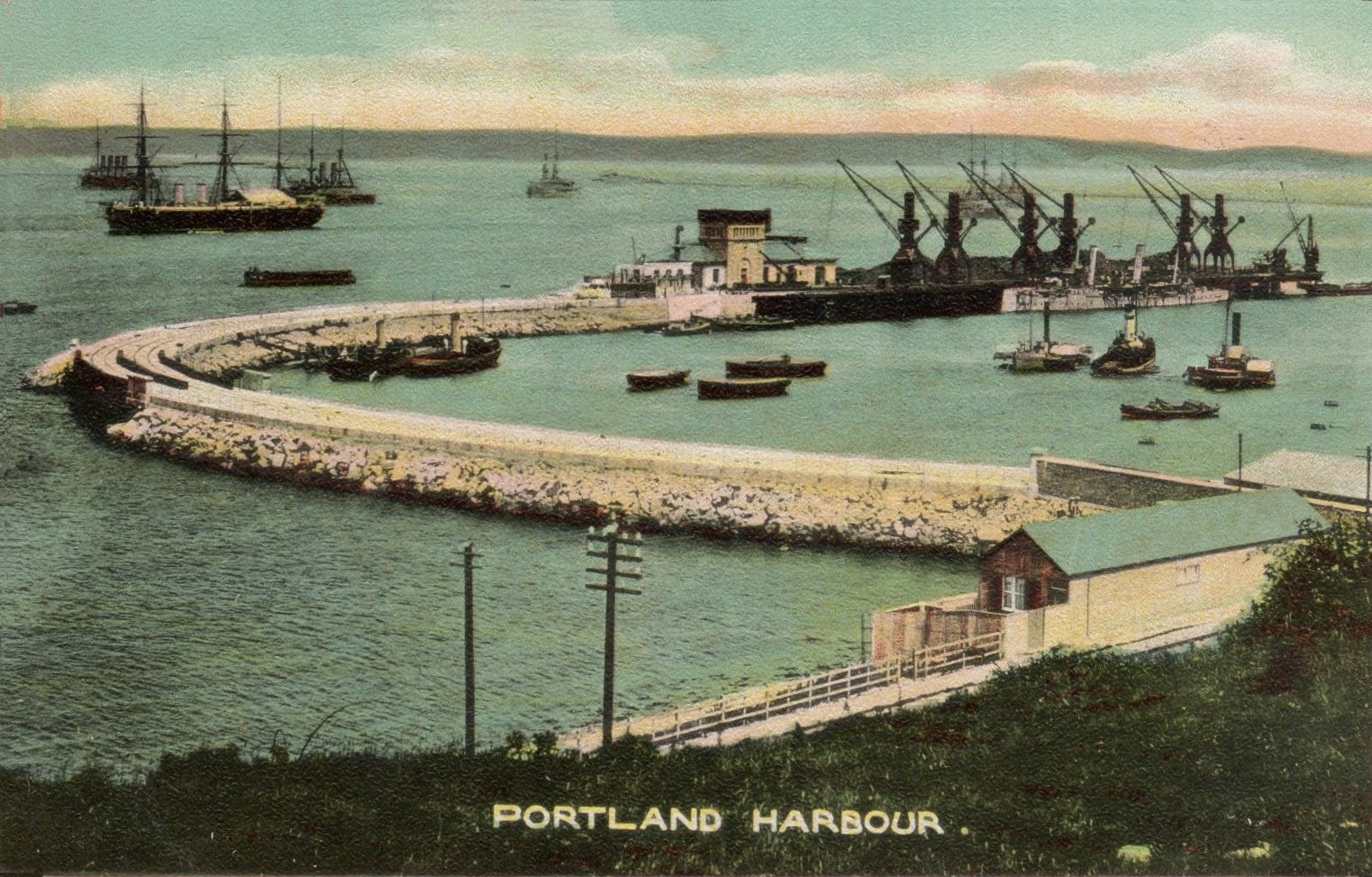
Admiralty coaling stage

In the 1840s, it was desired to provide a harbour of refuge at Portland. There was no other suitable place between Portsmouth and Plymouth. On 11 May 1847, the Portland Breakwater Act 1847 (10 & 11 Vict. c. 24) was passed; the Commissioners of Woods and Forests could acquire land necessary to build a breakwater. Construction of the breakwater was a prodigious task involving very large quantities of stone and gravel, and it was not completed until 1872. Even then, much further defensive and marine work was continuing.

During the construction of the breakwater, several temporary tramways had been laid. In 1870, it was decided that a more permanent railway connection was required, and the Great Western Railway (Additional Powers) Act 1871 (34 & 35 Vict. c. clxxxiii) and the South Western Railway Act 1875 (38 & 39 Vict. c. clxvi) of 19 July 1875 authorised the construction of a railway 1 1/2 miles (2.5km) long between the Admiralty Breakwater and the Weymouth and Portland Railway. The line was to be known as the Admiralty Line.

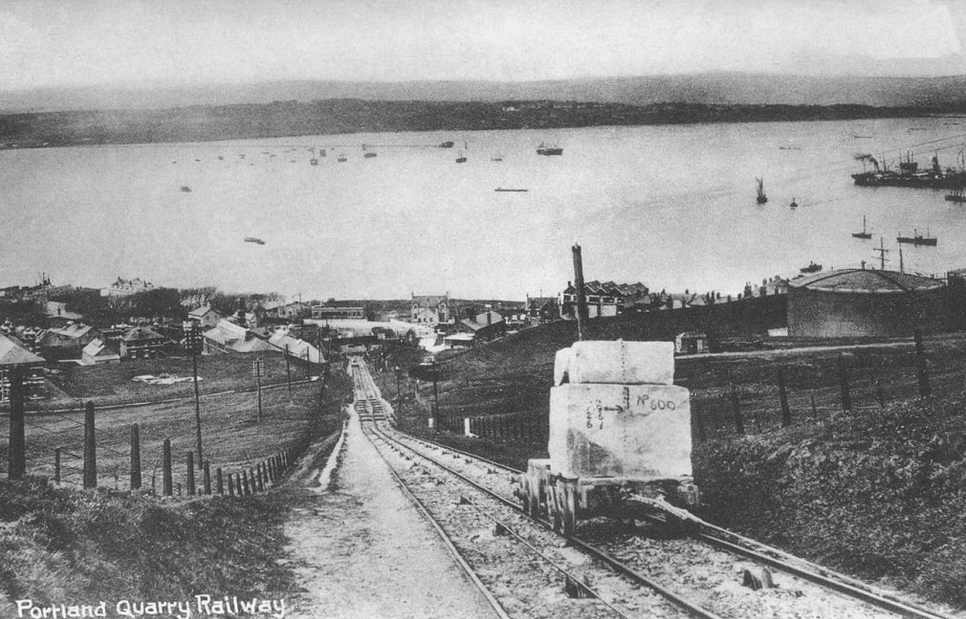
Stone descending the Merchants' Railway

The line was built at the expense of the Admiralty and the railway companies operated it for them. Although it was used principally by horse-drawn goods traffic the Board of Trade insisted on it being fully interlocked to passenger standards. As a private railway there was no general announcement of opening of the line, but the Southern Times reported that "a Great Western passed over the line on Wednesday [19 July 1876]. A few alterations must be made in laying the metals before the railway can be declared open." From 1881 bunkering of merchant ships took place from the breakwater and coal was conveyed down the new railway to reach it.

== Easton and Church Hope Railway ==
=== Early attempts ===
Easton and Church Hope Railway Act 1867
- Act of Parliament
- Parliament of the United Kingdom
- Long title: An Act for making a Railway from Easton in the Isle of Portland to Church Hope Cove, with a Pier in connexion therewith; and for other Purposes.
- Citation: 30 & 31 Vict. c. clxvii

Dates
- Royal assent: 25 July 1867

Text of statute as originally enacted

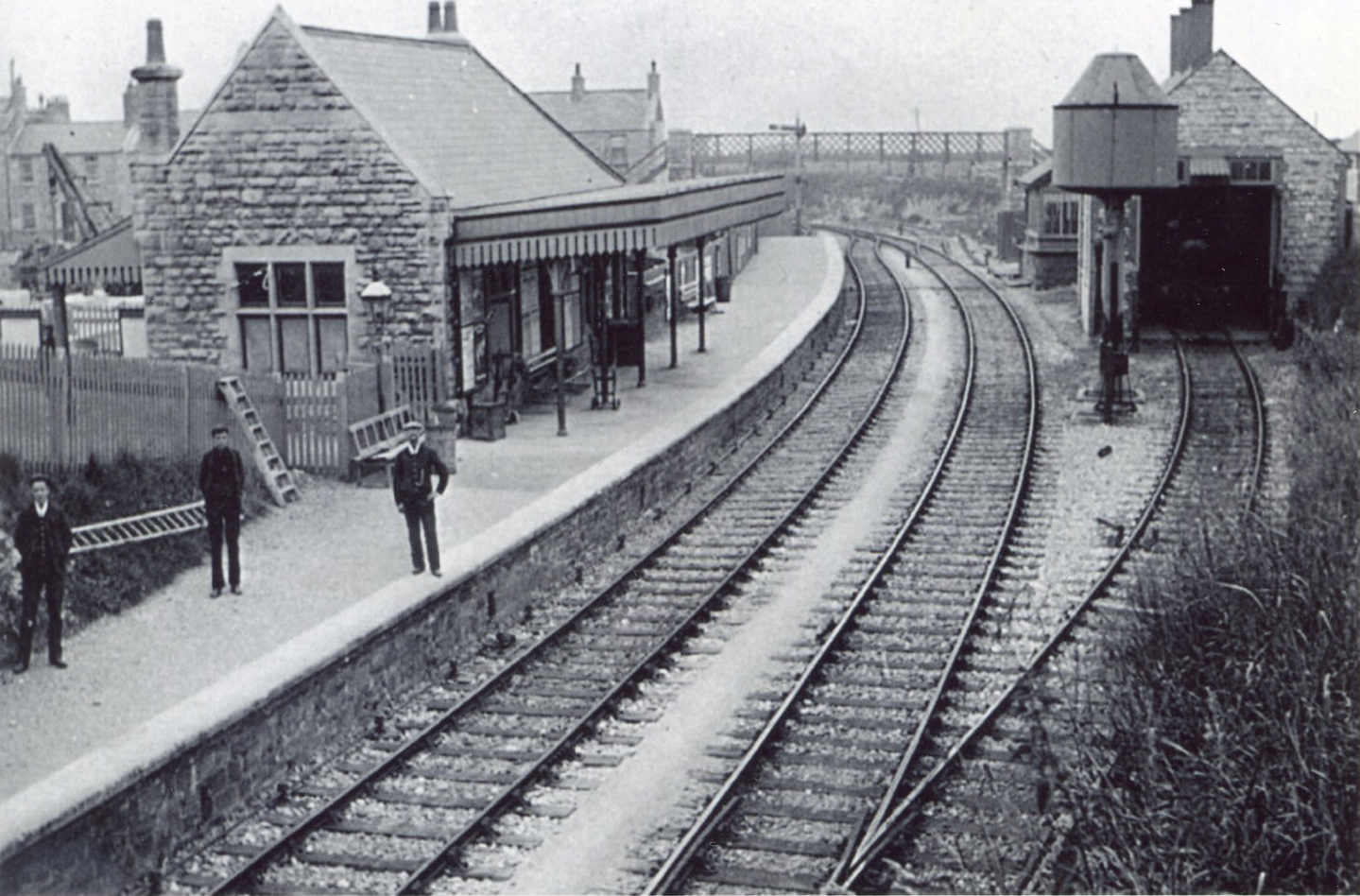
Easton station looking south

In 1866, another line was proposed on the Isle of Portland: the Easton and Church Hope Railway. It was to be on the south-east side of the island; it was intended as another line to bring quarried stone down to the water's edge where a new jetty would be constructed. The act of Parliament for the short line, the Easton and Church Hope Railway Act 1867 (30 & 31 Vict. c. clxvii), obtained royal assent on 25 July 1867, with a share capital of £25,000. It was to run from Sheepcroft, immediately north of Easton, to the top of the cliff above Church Ope Cove, where there was to be an inclined plane down to the foreshore. The line was to be made in a zigzag pattern and was to be broad gauge, with a 1-in-8 cable worked incline. After the 1867 incorporation, the company did not achieve very much until 1870, when representatives of commoners met. They had rights on some of the land to be crossed by the line and were due compensation. The sum of £850 was agreed. At the end of 1872, the powers granted by the act of Parliament expired; 1,320 yards (1,200m) of the railway had been built but not put into operation, and £20,250 had been expended.

Easton and Church Hope Railway (Portland Extension) Act 1884
- Act of Parliament
- Parliament of the United Kingdom
- Long title: An Act to authorise the Easton and Church Hope Railway Company to make branch railways in the Parish of Portland in the County of Dorset and for other purposes.
- Citation: 47 & 48 Vict. c. cclviii

Dates
- Royal assent: 14 August 1884

Text of statute as originally enacted

As the years passed with no sign of any progress towards completion, shareholders' meetings began to be ignored by the proprietors. In 1884 a new board had arranged an act of Parliament, the Easton and Church Hope Railway (Portland Extension) Act 1884 (47 & 48 Vict. c. cclviii) to authorised a fundamental change of plan by the company: it would build a new line to link up with the Portland Railway, and abandon the unfinished section to Church Ope Cove. The act of Parliament was passed on 14 August 1884; despite the decision not to reach Church Ope, the company name was unchanged. The authorised share capital was £50,000. Most importantly running powers were obtained over the Admiralty line so as to reach and connect with Weymouth and Portland Railway. Having obtained the necessary authority, the company once again failed to act to construct the line, and in 1885 further plans were made for alterations to the route. The extremely ambitious intention now was to take over the Weymouth and Portland Railway, even though that company was successfully trading, and the Easton and Church Hope Railway itself had not so far run any trains whatsoever. The takeover never happened.

Easton and Church Hope Railway Act 1887
- Act of Parliament
- Parliament of the United Kingdom
- Long title: An Act to enable the Easton and Church Hope Railway Company to alter the levels of a portion of their existing railway; to abandon a portion of their authorised railway; to construct new railways, and for other purposes.
- Citation: 50 & 51 Vict. c. cxc

Dates
- Royal assent: 23 August 1887

Text of statute as originally enacted

Easton and Church Hope Railway Act 1890
- Act of Parliament
- Parliament of the United Kingdom
- Long title: An Act to revive the Powers and extend the Periods for the compulsory Purchase of Lands and for the construction of so much of the Railways authorised by the Easton and Church Hope Railway (Portland Extension) Act 1884 as has not been abandoned under the authority of the Easton and Church Hope Railway Act 1887 and for other Purposes.
- Citation: 53 & 54 Vict. c. cxii

Dates
- Royal assent: 25 July 1890

Other legislation
- Relates to: Easton and Church Hope Railway (Portland Extension) Act 1884; Easton and Church Hope Railway Act 1887

Text of statute as originally enacted

Easton and Church Hope Railway Act 1892
- Act of Parliament
- Parliament of the United Kingdom
- Long title: An Act to authorise the Easton and Church Hope Railway Company to re-arrange their capital to extend the time for the completion of their railways and for other purposes.
- Citation: 55 & 56 Vict. c. cxlix

Dates
- Royal assent: 27 June 1892

Text of statute as originally enacted

Easton and Church Hope Railway (Extension of Time) Act 1896
- Act of Parliament
- Parliament of the United Kingdom
- Long title: An Act to extend the time for the completion of the authorised Railways of the Easton and Church Hope Railway Company and for other purposes.
- Citation: 59 & 60 Vict. c. cxciv

Dates
- Royal assent: 7 August 1896

Text of statute as originally enacted

Easton and Church Hope Railway Act 1897
- Act of Parliament
- Parliament of the United Kingdom
- Long title: An Act to authorise the Easton and Church Hope Railway Company to issue New Preference Stock in substitution for existing First and Second Preference Shares and for other purposes.
- Citation: 60 & 61 Vict. c. cxix

Dates
- Royal assent: 15 July 1897

Text of statute as originally enacted

Easton and Church Hope Railway (Extension of Time) Act 1898
- Act of Parliament
- Parliament of the United Kingdom
- Long title: An Act to extend the time for the completion of the authorised railways of the Easton and Church Hope Railway Company and for other purposes.
- Citation: 61 & 62 Vict. c. clxxxi

Dates
- Royal assent: 2 August 1898

Text of statute as originally enacted

On 23 August 1887, another act of Parliament, the Easton and Church Hope Railway Act 1887 (50 & 51 Vict. c. cxc) was passed, allowing the company £40,000 of further share capital and another extension of time. Three years passed now with no progress made on the ground, and the time limit in the act of Parliament expired. Another act of Parliament, the Easton and Church Hope Railway Act 1890 (53 & 54 Vict. c. cxii) was obtained on 25 July 1890 (53 & 54 Vict. c. cxii), now allowing further time and authorising deviations to the route. Still, more acts of Parliament were obtained for extension of time; the Easton and Church Hope Railway (Extension of Time) Act 1894 (57 & 58 Vict. c. cxlix) in July 1894 and the Easton and Church Hope Railway (Extension of Time) Act 1896 (59 & 60 Vict. c. cxciv) August 1896; by now, £80,000 had been expended on obtaining land and legal and other expenses, though the directors were still confident that a 4% dividend would be paid when the line was completed.

On 5 August 1897 the Church Hope company entered an agreement with the GWR and the LSWR for those companies to work their line jointly.

In 1901 the Admiralty decided to acquire the Admiralty line, taking it over from the GWR and the LSWR. The Easton and Church Hope Company had hoped to share the cost of upgrading the Admiralty line for passenger operation with the main line companies, but now the Admiralty made it clear that it would not assist, leaving the Easton company having to bear the entire cost of the upgrade.

The question of a joint station at Portland had arisen several times over the past two years. In January 1900 the estimated cost was considered to be £18,000. It was suggested that the Easton company should pay £2,000 as its share of the cost of the upgrade, and it quickly agreed, as it had anticipated that it might be obliged to pay the entire cost of the altered arrangements. Colonel Yorke for the Board of Trade inspected the line on 3 July 1900, and he remarked that the railway was not laid out according to the plans. He was not impressed with the bridge over the Merchants' Incline; this was an original structure of the Admiralty railway which had carried only freight traffic. Accordingly Yorke declined to give permission to open the line to passenger traffic; however goods traffic did not require his sanction and was allowed.

=== Opening, at last ===
Easton and Church Hope Railway Act 1901
- Act of Parliament
- Parliament of the United Kingdom
- Long title: An Act to confer further powers on the Easton and Church Hope Railway Company.
- Citation: 1 Edw. 7. c. ccxxxv

Dates
- Royal assent: 9 August 1901

The public goods service started on 1 October 1900. The directors were surprised to find that the stone traffic business did not pick up in the early period of operation as they had hoped. It was established that the loading depots were too far from the source of traffic, and that the goods rates were too high. In addition since the Merchants' Railway had been opened many of the quarries had established routes by which their product was taken by traction engines to a loading point on that line. The Easton and Church Hope line had arrived too late to secure this kind of traffic. The Admiralty ended its agreement for maintenance of their own line as they had no further use for it and the Easton company had to apply to Parliament for powers to carry out that work itself. The necessary act of Parliament, the Easton and Church Hope Railway Act 1901 (1 Edw. 7. c. ccxxxv) was obtained on 9 August 1901. During May 1901 it was established that the company had exhausted all of its financial resources.

Lieut Colonel Yorke visited the Admiralty section of the line on 19 March 1902, and he was dismayed to find that the train staff could be withdrawn from the ground frame lock at Castletown with the points set for the sidings, completely contrary to proper interlocking arrangements; there was no locking whatsoever on the section of line into Portland station. He once again declined to give authority for opening the line. At Portland work started on erecting a temporary wooden platform on the five chain (100m) radius curve between Portland station and Castletown road bridge. The platform was connected to the original Portland station by a footpath and was completed by 19 July. It was inspected by Colonel Yorke on 14 August 1902; he was not happy with the sharp curve but as this appeared to be only a temporary arrangement pending the building of the new station he accepted it. The Church Hope line opened on 1 September 1902. The physical connection between the two lines at Portland was not approved for passenger operation, so the branch service was worked as a separate section from the temporary Portland station to Easton.

In 1908 the Church Hope Railway line was placed in the hands of a receiver as a result of an action brought by debenture holders.

At the time of opening to Easton, the entire line between Weymouth and Easton was worked between by the Great Western and London and South Western companies together, although the railway infrastructure was still owned by their respective companies. However the LSWR took over the working of the branch on 1 January 1904.

=== Later station improvements ===
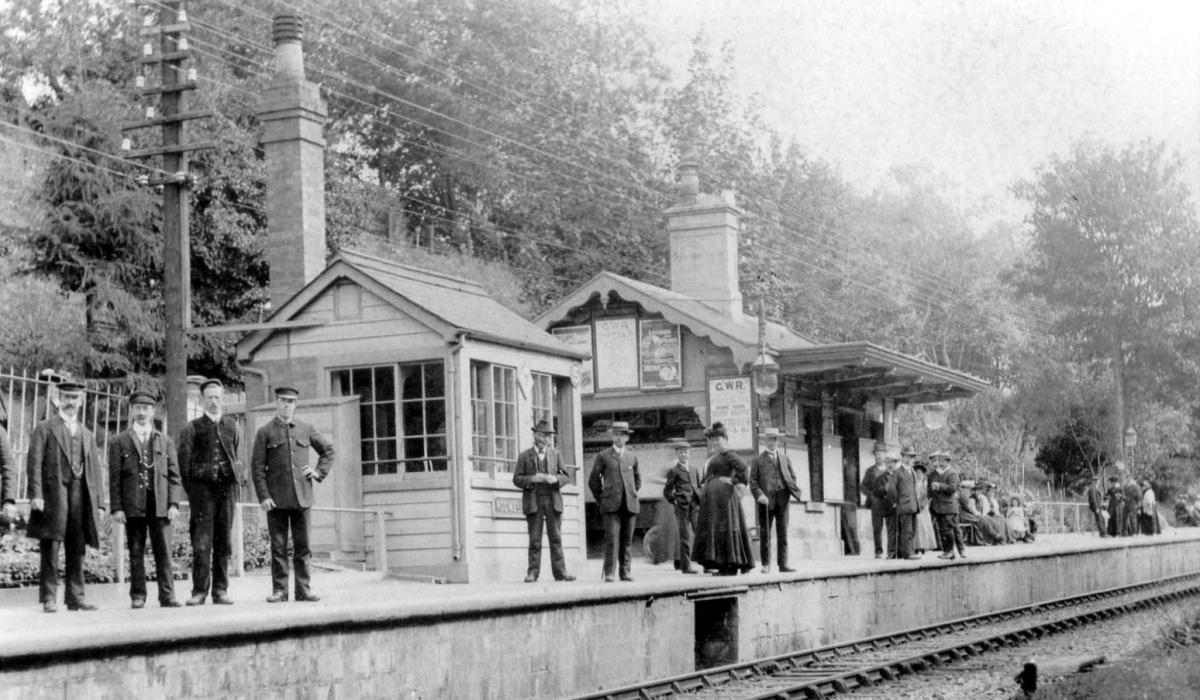
Rodwell station

Over time the development of passenger and goods traffic on the branch had now outstripped the original Portland station facilities. The platform was extended by 100 feet (30m) to a length of 276 ft (84m) in February 1891, making it capable of accommodating eleven 4-wheeled coaches.

The platform at Rodwell was extended during January 1894, for by then the Rodwell area was rapidly expanding and more passengers were travelling between Weymouth and Portland. By this date passenger traffic through to Portland was increasing considerably. The facilities at Portland station–still far from ideal–were improved early in 1896 when a wall and cover were constructed on the west side of the station to protect the platform and the waiting passengers from the elements. The platform was resurfaced at the same time.

The new integrated Portland station, serving both lines, was opened on 7 May 1905, and on March a trial run had been made to Easton with a steam railmotor. In September 1905 it was announced that an hourly train service would be operated on the branch, with rail motors alternating with conventional trains. This was an operational challenge on a single line with no passing places, and with the complication of the shunt to get into Weymouth station. In fact the rail motor service was not implemented at first.

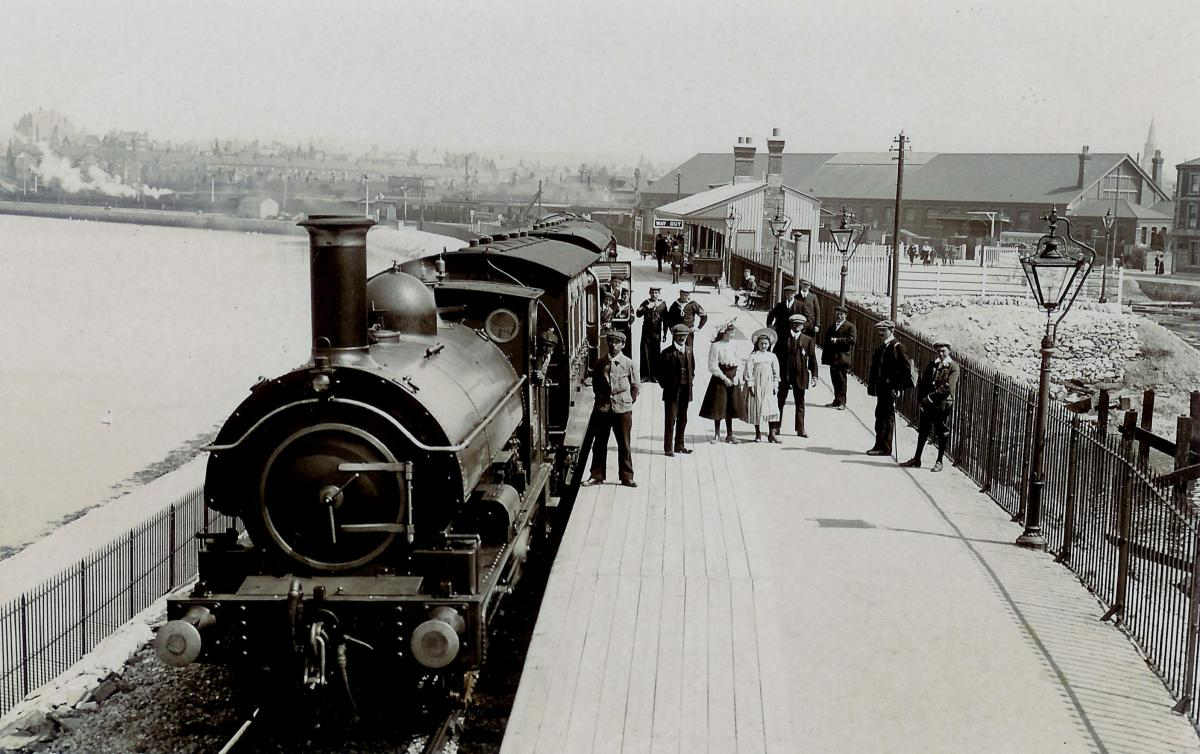
Melcombe Regis station, Weymouth

Melcombe Regis station opened in April 1909, and after that time all trains to Portland started from the new station; the punctuality of the service was greatly improved.

In June 1909 halts were built at Westham and Wyke Regis and on 1 July the long-awaited improved rail service started with 13 trains each way between Weymouth and Portland, with an additional nine rail motors. Only the rail motors were able to serve the new halts at Westham and Wyke Regis, and they did not run on Sundays so those places did not have a train service on that day.

== After the Grouping ==
The Railways Act 1921 created four new large railway companies, and the LSWR was absorbed into the new Southern Railway. The Weymouth and Portland Railway and the Easton And Church Hope companies were allowed to continue in existence.

In June 1927, there was a joint officers' conference of the Southern and Great Western companies examining the running costs of the line. Carrying the local stone out and coal in was very expensive due to the steep gradients but it was considered that the contributory value of the traffic due to long hauls on the main line compensated for that. However the passenger traffic was all very short distance, and closing the eastern section to passengers and replacement by railway-owned buses was considered, but not implemented.

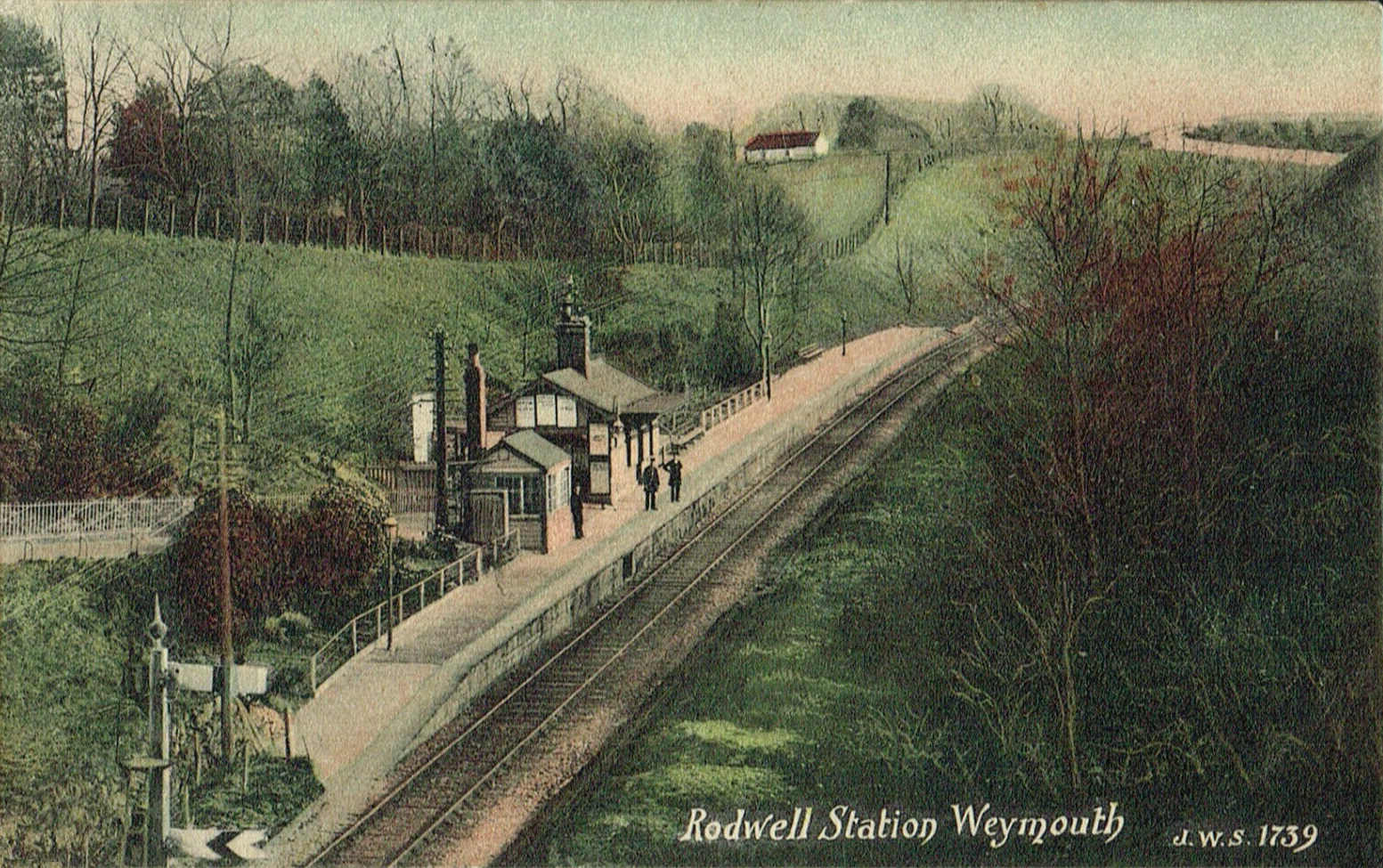
Rodwell station in 1905

The line was being operated jointly by the Southern Railway (as successor to the LSWR) and the Great Western Railway, but in 1931, the branch was brought into line with other pooling arrangements between the two companies, and the Southern Railway took over the entire operation of passenger services on the line. Owing to a combination of air raid damage and its low potential as a passenger carrying line, the Easton section from Portland was closed to passenger traffic from 11 November 1940, although the service was restored during the summer months from 1941 to 1944.

Nevertheless the decline in passenger carryings was inexorable, and it was announced that the Portland lines would be closed to passengers on 3 March 1952.

After the closure Melcombe Regis station was occasionally used for trains on the main line arriving at Weymouth, when platform availability was inadequate.

Goods traffic was not immune to the decline, and the last goods train ran on 9 April 1965, clearing last wagons, the goods service having closed on 5 April.

== Topography ==
=== Gradients ===
The Easton and Church Hope line fell steeply from Sheepcroft, at a ruling gradient of 1 in 40.

=== Locations ===
- Weymouth Junction;
- Melcombe Regis; opened 30 May 1909; closed 3 March 1952, but retained as summer Saturdays overflow for Weymouth until 12 September 1959;
- Westham Halt; opened 1 July 1909; closed 3 March 1952;
- Rodwell; opened 1 June 1870; closed 3 March 1952;
- Sandsfoot Castle Halt; opened 1 August 1932; closed 3 March 1952;
- Wyke Regis Halt; opened 1 July 1909; closed 3 March 1952;
- Portland Goods Junction;
- Portland; opened 16 October 1865; closed 7 May 1905.

- Portland Goods Junction; above;
- Portland; temporary platform provided 1 September 1902 for Easton trains; permanent station was provided in stages: down platform 2 January 1905, up 7 May 1905, for extension to Easton; closed 3 March 1952; there was use later for Royal Navy special trains;
- Hospital Halt; not in timetables; used about 1925 to 1965;
- Easton; opened 1 September 1902; summer only from 11 November 1940; fully again 1 January 1945; closed 3 March 1952.

== The line today ==
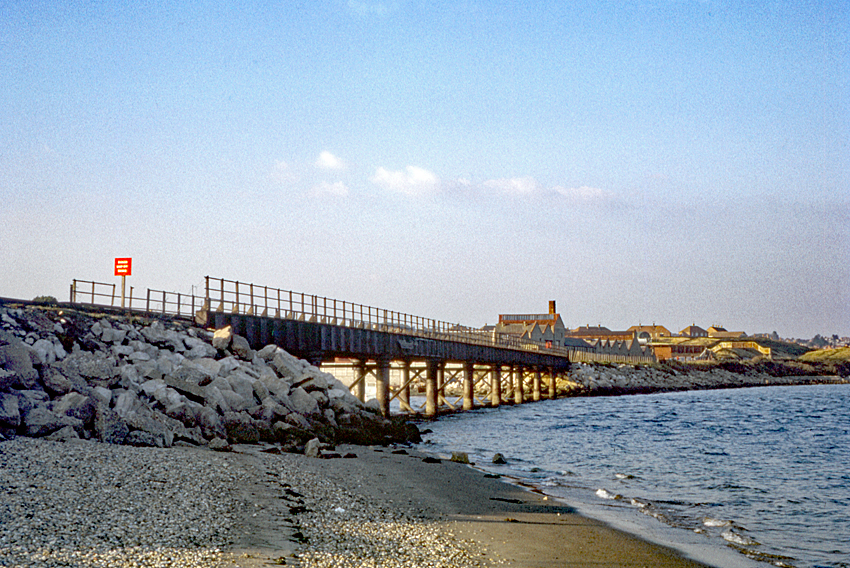
Portland branch bridge over the Fleet

Today, parts of the line can still be walked, but the course of the backwater railway viaduct has long since been replaced by Weymouth’s Swannery road bridge, which was built in virtually the same place. The former platforms at Westham and Rodwell are still to be seen and this section is a popular green trailway, the Rodwell Trail. The bridge over The Fleet at Smallmouth was demolished in 1972. The route now passes through a boatyard, then along the Portland causeway over open common land. Reaching the southwest corner of Portland Harbour, the route now lies under a landscaped earthen embankment, which marks the edge of Portland's National Sailing Academy. Here, there is little evidence of the old railway, until east of Castletown, within Portland Port, where it re-emerges to climb the steep hillside of East Weares. This section has become a fine walk and leads to the spectacular cliffside cutting above Church Ope Cove. This section made it one of the most scenic coastal branch lines in the south of England; it is now part of Dorset's World Heritage Jurassic Coast and included in the Portland Coast Path. Due to the Portland naval base, the northern end can only be accessed by a path down the cliffs from near Portland Young Offenders Institution.
