= All Saints Church, Wyke Regis =

Church in Dorset, England

All Saints Church
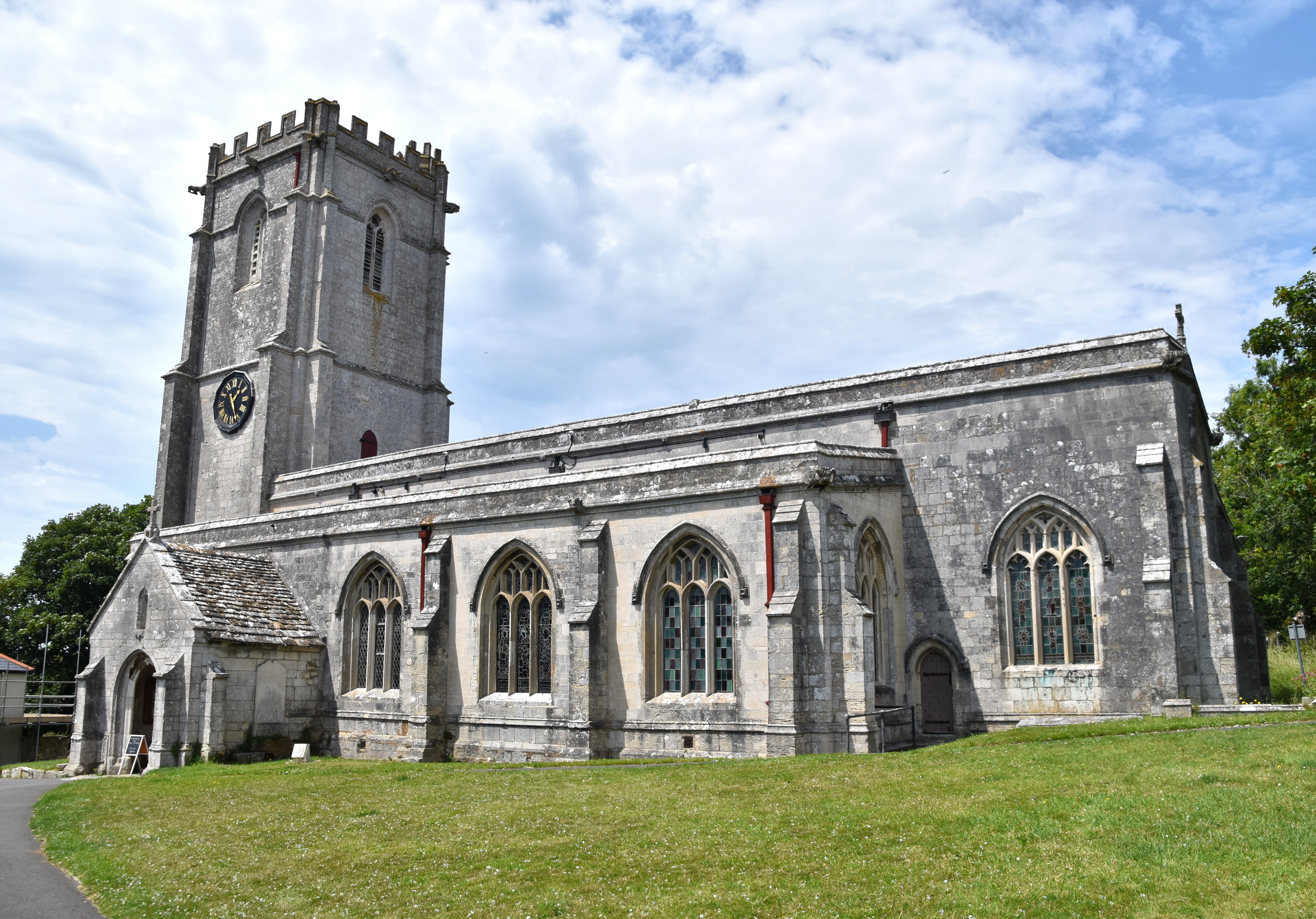

Religion
- Affiliation: Church of England
- Ecclesiastical or organizational status: Active
- Year consecrated: 1455

Location
- Location: Wyke Regis, Dorset, England
- Interactive map of All Saints Church
- Coordinates: 50.5988°N 2.4787°W

Architecture
- Type: Church

All Saints Church is a Church of England church of 15th-century origin in Wyke Regis, Weymouth, Dorset, England. Built largely of Portland stone, the Royal Commission on the Historical Monuments of England have described the church as a "remarkably consistent and unchanged 15th-century design". It has been a Grade I listed building since 1953. Facing Wyke Road from the modern cemetery opposite the church is the Wyke Regis War Memorial, erected in 1919.

== History ==
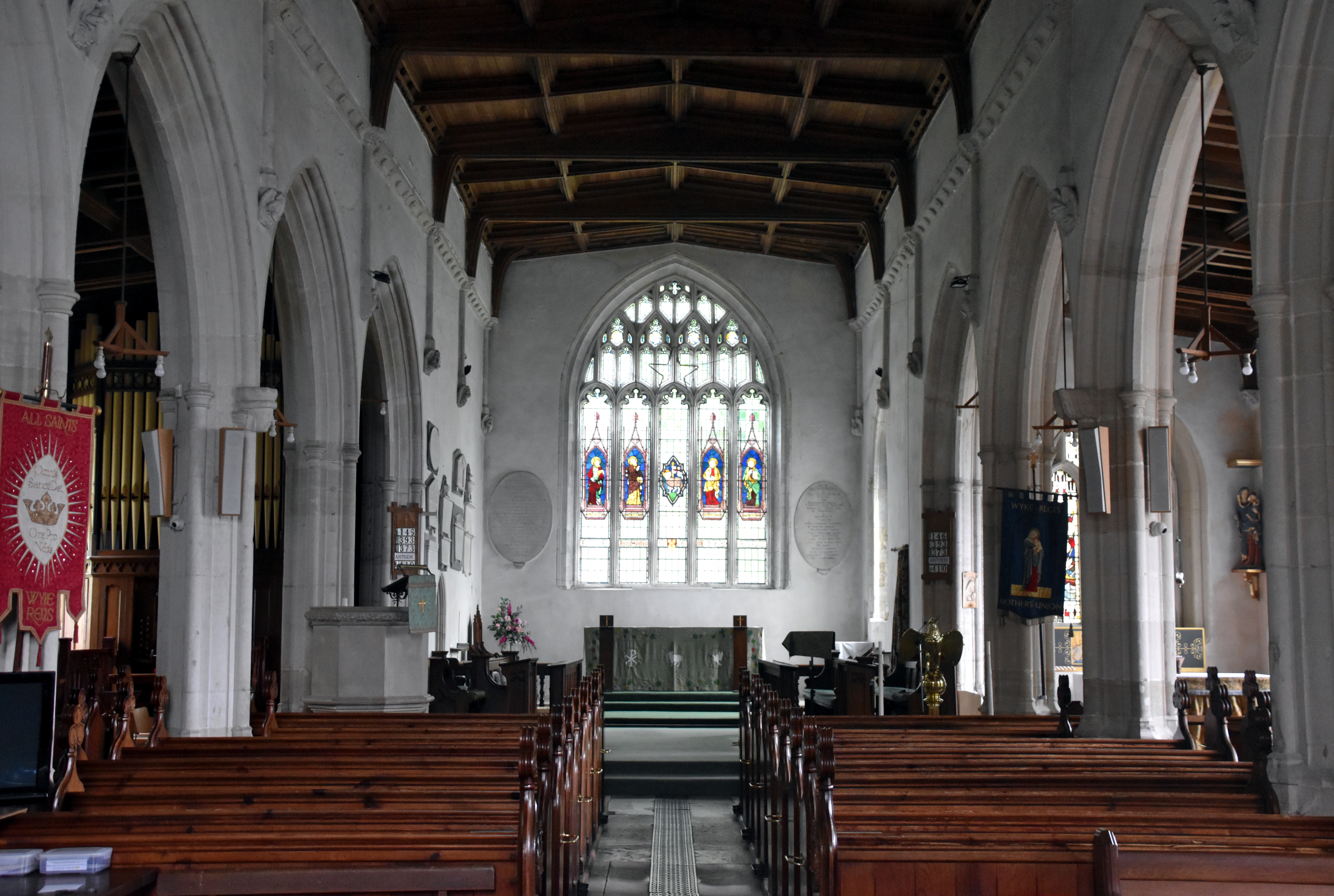
The interior of All Saints Church.

The present All Saints Church dates to the mid-15th-century, however a church has been recorded on the same site as early as 1172. The present building was completed in 1455 and re-consecrated on 19 October that year. All Saints was the original parish church of Weymouth until the 19th century, when other churches were built to meet the growing population, including Holy Trinity Church, overlooking Weymouth Town Bridge, St Paul's Church in Westham and St Edmund's Church in Lanehouse.

Overlooking the Isle of Portland and Chesil Beach, the tower of the church was a prominent landmark for vessels during the age of sail. Within the churchyard are the unmarked graves of around eighty who died on board the Earl of Abergavenny, including the captain John Wordsworth, brother of the poet William Wordsworth. The ship sank in Weymouth Bay in 1805 after striking the Shambles Sandbank off of the Isle of Portland. Bodies recovered from the merchant vessel Alexander, wrecked in 1815, are also buried in the churchyard.

The church was reseated with new pews in 1859. Other improvements included the installation of a new pulpit and reading desk, and the removal of the church's gallery, which involved moving the organ to a platform under the tower. The work cost an estimated £500, £460 of which had already been raised by March 1859, when the plans were approved by the Weymouth vestry. The church reopened on 11 December 1859, with the morning sermon being preached by the Bishop of Salisbury, the Right Rev. Walter Kerr Hamilton, and the afternoon sermon preached by the rector, Rev. H. C. Pigon. A lych gate was added to the churchyard in 1896. It was erected by the builder Mr. J. Bishop to the designs of George Fellowes Prynne.

== Bells ==
All Saints Church has the following bells:

Bell	Diameter	Weight	Note	Inscription
Treble	26 1/2 in (670 mm)	4 1/2 long hundredweight (500 lb; 230 kg)	F	John G. and Emma Rowe Thanksgiving (1891)
2	27 3/4 in (700 mm)	4 3/4 long hundredweight (530 lb; 240 kg)	E	In loving memory of Mabel Vincent of Faircross (1891)
3	29 3/8 in (750 mm)	5 1/2 long hundredweight (620 lb; 280 kg)	D	Peace be within thy walls (1891)
4	31 3/4 in (810 mm)	6 1/4 long hundredweight (700 lb; 320 kg)	C	Bless ye the Lord, praise him, and magnify him for ever (1891)
5	34 5/8 in (880 mm)	7 1/2 long hundredweight (840 lb; 380 kg)	B♭	Give thanks to God (1891)
6	36 1/2 in (930 mm)	9 long hundredweight (1,000 lb; 460 kg)	A	The women of Wyke gave me (1891)
7	40 3/8 in (1,030 mm)	11 3/4 long hundredweight (1,320 lb; 600 kg)	G	Given by the Revd Fredrick Tufnell MA. In memory of his wife, Margaret Tufnell who died 1888. Oye spirits and souls of the righteous bless ye the Lord, Praise him and magnify him for ever (1891)
Tenor	45 1/2 in (1,160 mm)	16 3/18 long hundredweight (1,810 lb; 820 kg)	F	Lord, may this bell for ever be a tuneful voice o'er land and sea, to call thy people unto thee. (1891)

== Incumbents of Wyke Regis ==
The incumbents of Wyke Regis were:

- Nicholas Lungspee – 1263
- William Harvey – 1299
- Simon de Migham – 1302
- Simon de Stopham – 1307
- William de Winterborn – 1314
- Simon de Moenes – 1316
- Uricus de Rupis – 1316
- William Archer – 1324
- Welter de Shryeborn – date unknown
- William Stanton – 1349
- Henry Chelford – 1408
- Thomas Wassayl – 1445
- Thomas Hall – 1450
- William Stoke – 1453
- William Gifford – 1467
- Edmund Hampden – 1469
- John Baker – 1476
- Henry Sutten – 1480
- Henry Sutton M.D – 1495
- Benedict Dodyn – 1497
- William Bower – 1519
- Williams Medow – 1531
- Thomas Watson – 1545
- Thomas Haywood – 1553
- John Sprint – 1574
- William Garth – 1576
- Nicholas Jeffries – 1584
- Eleazer Duncomb – 1631
- Edward Quarles – 1631
- Humphrey Henchman – 1640
- Henry Way – 1643
- Edward Buckler – 1650
- Edward Butler – 1652
- Edward Damer – date unknown
- Thomas Clendon – 1662
- Richard Drake – 1667
- Robert Wishart – 1681
- William Hunt (was also vicar of Whitchurch Canonicorum) – 1689
- William Rayner – 1720
- Abraham Davis – 1730
- Michael Festin – 1753
- John Cutting – 1765
- Samuel Payne – 1792
- Samuel Byam – 1802
- George Chamberlaine – 1809
- John Menzies – 1837
- John Thomas – 1847
- John Hill – 1851
- Henry Pigou – 1855
- Richard England – 1882
- Sidney Edmund Davies – 1899
- Edward B Thurston – 1918
- Ernest Pratt – 1942
- Philip Rigby Rounds – 1967 to 1989
- Keith Hugo – 1989 to 2006
- Deborah Smith – April 2007 to 18 September 2018
- Alasdair Kay – 25 September 2019 to 4 June 2023
- John MacKenzie – from 17 October 2023
