= Humphrey Henchman =

English clergyman

The Right Reverend and Right Honourable Humphrey Henchman
- Bishop of London
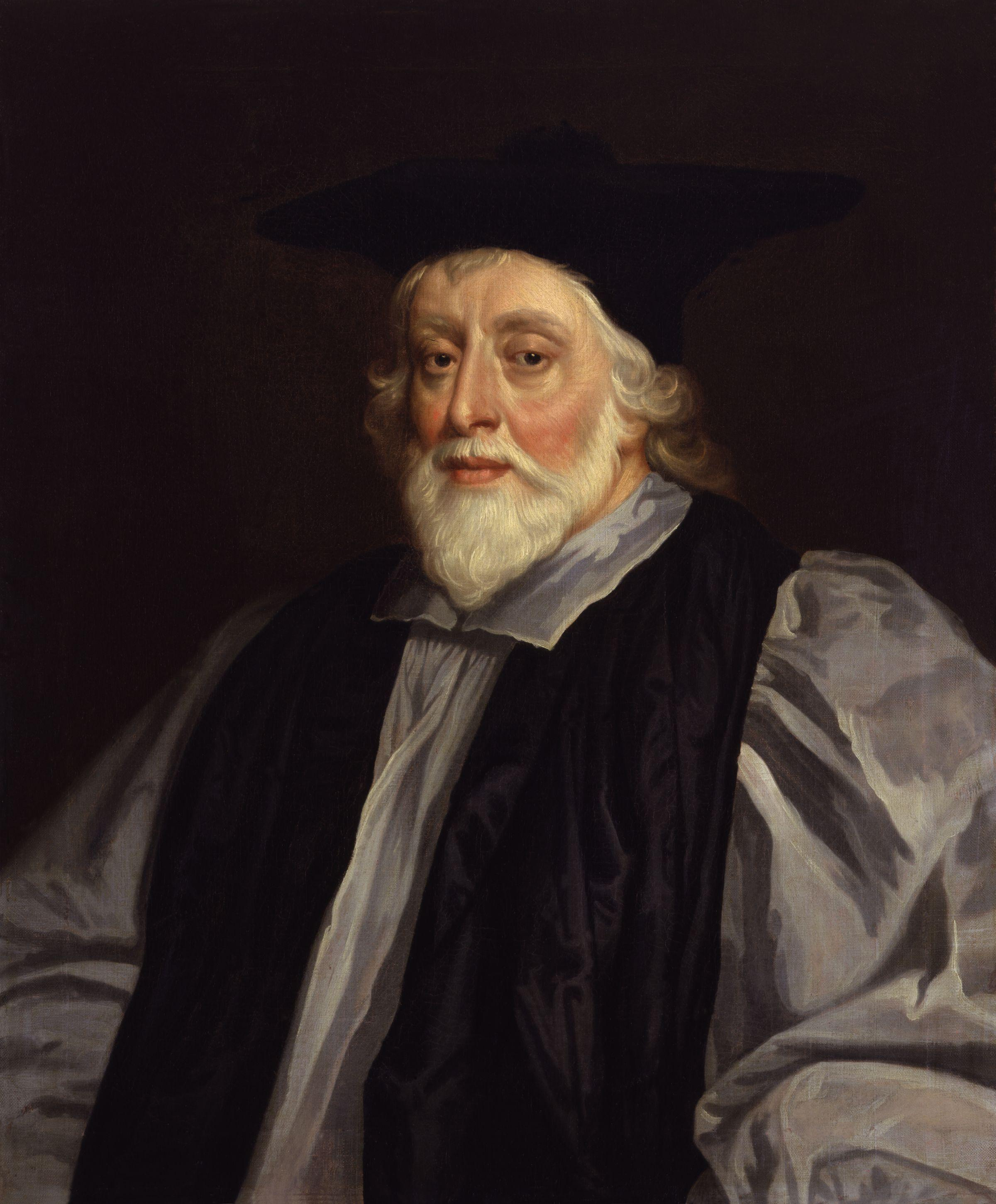
- Church: Church of England
- Diocese: Diocese of London
- Elected: 1663
- Term ended: 1675 (death)
- Predecessor: Gilbert Sheldon
- Successor: Henry Compton
- Other posts: Bishop of Salisbury; 1660–1663

Orders
- Consecration: 28 October 1660 by Brian Duppa

Personal details
- Born: 1592 Burton Latimer, Northamptonshire
- Died: 1675 (aged 82–83) Aldersgate Street, London
- Buried: All Saints Church, Fulham
- Denomination: Anglican
- Parents: Thomas Henchman
- Education: Christ's College, Cambridge

Humphrey Henchman (1592–1675) was a Church of England clergyman and bishop of London from 1663 to 1675.

== Biography ==
He was born in Burton Latimer (or possibly nearby Barton Seagrave), Northamptonshire, the son of Thomas Henchman, a skinner, and educated at Christ's College, Cambridge, where he achieved BA in 1613 and MA in 1616. He became a fellow of Clare College, Cambridge, in 1617.

In 1630, he married Ellen Lowe, niece of John Davenant, who was Bishop of Salisbury from 1621 to 1641; along with these connections, his wife brought considerable property from her first marriage, which meant he lived in some comfort. They had three sons and two daughters who survived to adulthood; his grandson, another Humphrey, was a prominent lawyer who defended Henry Sacheverell in 1710 and helped draft the 1713 Treaty of Utrecht.

== Career ==
Appointed canon of Salisbury Cathedral in 1623. Henchman was Rector of All Saints Church, Wyke Regis, Weymouth, Dorset from 1640 to 1643. His life was radically changed when the First English Civil War began in 1642 and he joined the Royalist forces. In 1643, Henry Way was appointed his successor as Rector of All Saints Church, Wyke Regis and he was ejected from his position at Wyke Regis and Salisbury and his estates were confiscated. He helped the future Charles II to escape the country after the Battle of Worcester of 1651, and participated in Penruddock's Rising in 1655. On the Restoration of 1660, he was made Bishop of Salisbury – he was elected to the See on 4 October 1660, confirmed 23 October, and consecrated a bishop on 28 October – and in 1663 translated to be Bishop of London, where he saw both the Great Plague and the Great Fire.

He was made Privy Councillor and Almoner to the King. In March 1665 he was elected a Fellow of the Royal Society.

== Sources ==
- Lay, Paul (2020). Providence Lost: The Rise and Fall of Cromwell's Protectorate. Head of Zeus. ISBN 978-1781852569.
- Spurr, John (2004). "Henchman, Humphrey". Oxford Dictionary of National Biography (online ed.). Oxford University Press. doi:10.1093/ref:odnb/12898. (Subscription, Wikipedia Library access or UK public library membership required.)

Church of England titles
Preceded by Brian Duppa	Bishop of Salisbury; 1660–1663	Succeeded by John Earle
Preceded by Gilbert Sheldon	Bishop of London; 1663–1675	Succeeded by Henry Compton
