= Wyke Regis Training Area =

Coordinates: 50.5952°N 2.4946°W

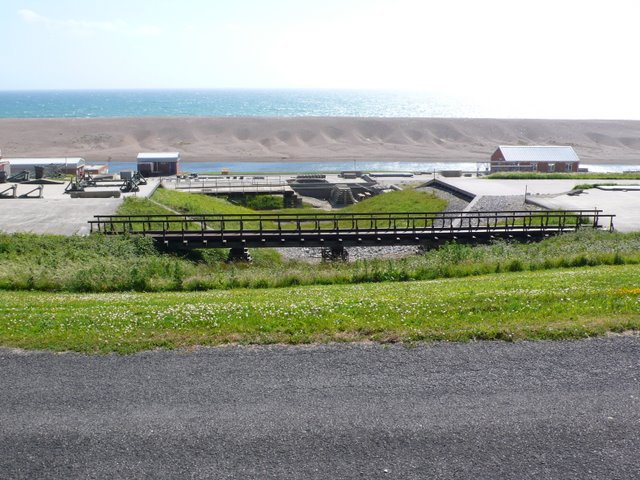
Wyke Regis Bridging Camp

Wyke Regis Training Area is an army training area primarily located in the parish and town of Chickerell, but near to the parish of Wyke Regis in neighbouring Weymouth, Dorset, England. The training area is located at three different sites. It is part of the Ministry of Defence's Defence Training Estate (DTE), which covers 240,000 hectares of land across the country, used to train armed forces. Although mainly used by the army, the training area has allowed an increasing amount of public use of both the climbing facilities and adventure training over the last few years. When the firing range is in use, signs, restriction gates and red flags are used to require walkers to divert inland around the back of the range before returning to the Coastal Path.

== Sites ==
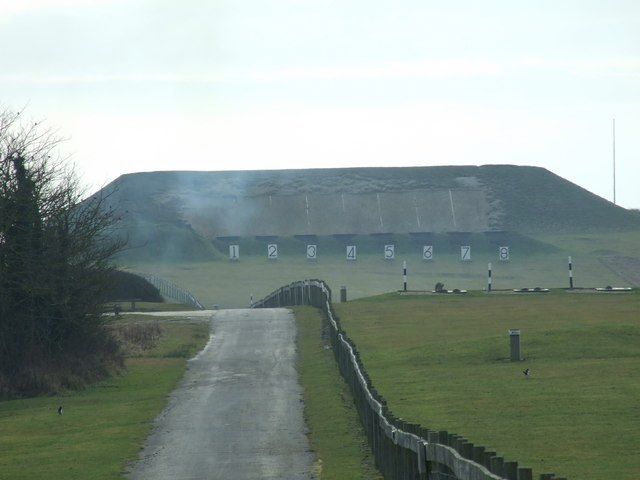
Chickerell Rifle Range

Consisting of the three sites, the main location is found to the west of the Wyke Regis village, where it lies on the north side of the Fleet tidal lagoon with Chesil Beach on the south side. This site, a bridging camp, was constructed in 1928 by Royal Engineers. Since then, the site has been in continuous use for Royal Engineers' (regular and reserve) training in the construction of both bridges and ferries, along with other types of military training. The Bridging Camp's inner training area allows Sappers to hone their skills on everything from raft building to familiarisation with modern weaponry. Due to the close proximity of the lagoon, water based training is held there.

A second site, a camp and rifle range, is located within the town and parish Chickerell which is located further up the Fleet Lagoon, and like the main bridging camp, it sites alongside the lagoon and beach. The site features an 8-lane small-arms rifle range, and is used for basic fieldcraft and patrolling exercises, along with marksmanship training. It also offers unique facilities for cadets. The range is typically used for 150 days per year and once held active sentries that were posted during live use to police the footpaths and offshore.

The third site of the Wyke Regis Training Area is located at Verne Yeates on the Isle of Portland, close to the Verne Citadel, and is used for bridging and signals training.

== History ==
The bridging camp was established at the Fleet narrows of Chesil Beach on 1 May 1928, losses of equipment through storms at annual bridging camps up to 1927 at Mudeford, near Christchurch. In the following years the camp was erected by the first unit in and struck by the last unit out. In 1938 the site was used by the Militia, and it continued as a training area during the Second World War, which included a period of use by the RAF as a base for some of their 'Dambusters' trials for the Bouncing bomb.

During 1945-49, the 9 Trg Bn Royal Engineers, who were based at the Verne Citadel on Portland, used the camp for some time before moving to the nearby Barrow Rise Camp as their headquarters after POWs redeveloped the Wyke Regis site. Territorial Army units used the site during 1947 and then each summer from 1950 onwards. After the first permanent Camp Commandant took over in 1954, Southern Command Bridging Camp Royal Engineers was one of four such units in the UK. In October 1956 the 37 Armoured Engineer Squadron used the site as part of their continued training, partaking in atomic simulation, HGB builds and a 288 ft class 30 EWBPS build, bridge demolitions and work on the Kings Ferry. One month later and the squadron deployed to Malta and then took part in the Suez operations in 1956. The camp was upgraded from 1960 to 1963, and as a result facilities were much improved with more permanent buildings.

By the mid-1960s, the camp saw more use of amphibious vehicles and less of floating bridges. Shortly after the Royal Engineers Bridging Camp of Wyke Regis was the only one left in the UK. In 1973 the Chickerell Camp and Range were taken over, and this providing extra hutted accommodation for use in both summer and winter. As a celebration of the broadening of the training facilities to include other Combat Engineer subjects besides bridging, the unit was renamed The Royal Engineers Training Camp on the camp's 50th anniversary in 1978.

In 1983, to mark the 55-year association, the Freedom of the Borough of Weymouth and Portland was granted to the Corps of Royal Engineers. The event was marked with a parade and, ten years later, in September 1993, 22 Engineer Regiment again exercised their right to march through the town with 'bayonets fixed and drums beating' to celebrate this singular honour. In 1999 Wyke Regis Training Area came under command of Army Training Estates as part of ATE SW, before command transferred to Defence in April 2006.

In August 2011, the bridging camp was opened to the public for one day as visitors were given a tour, and various presentations and demonstrations.
