= Wyke Regis Methodist Church =

Church in Wyke Regis, Dorset, England

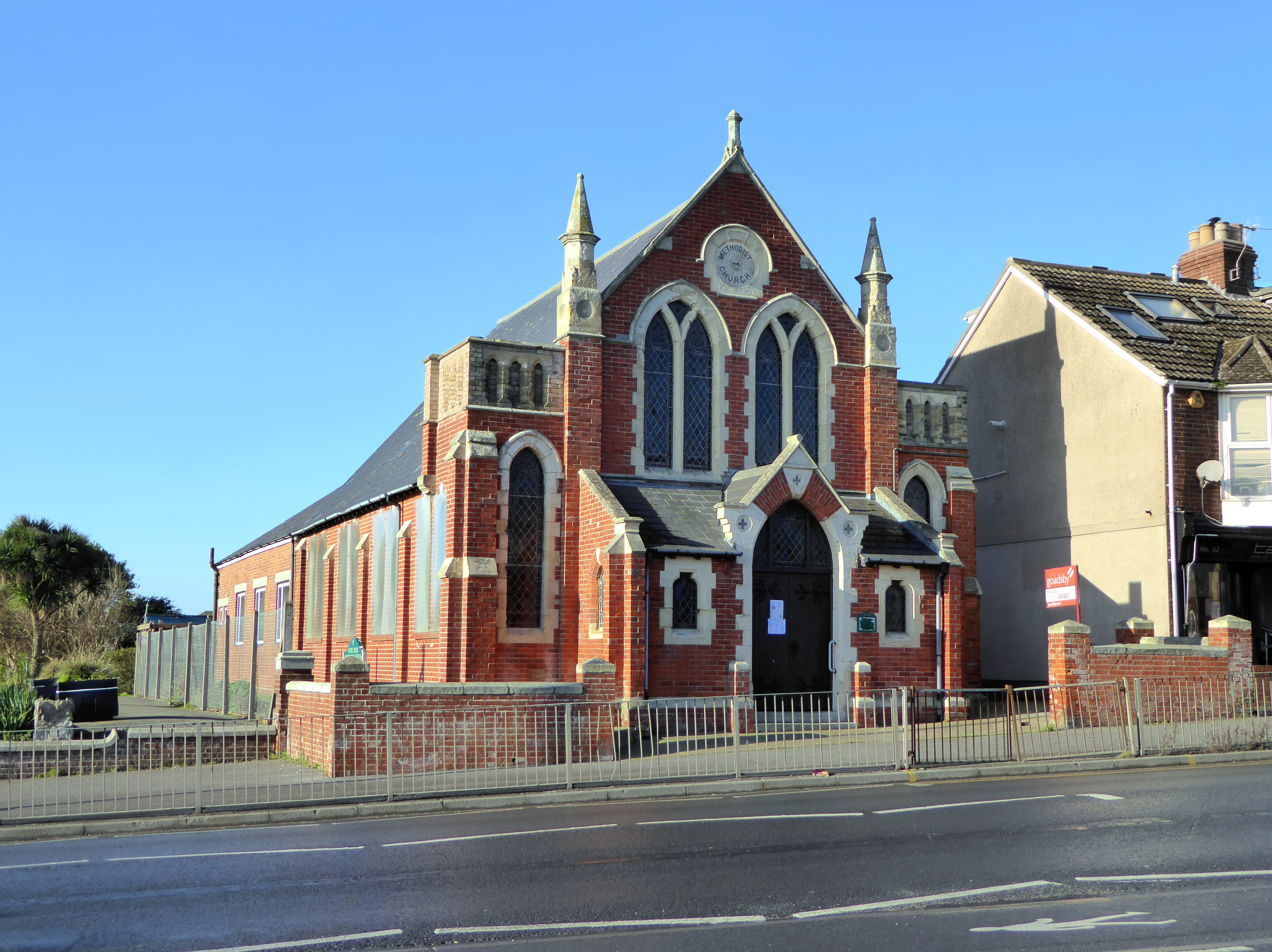

Religion
- Affiliation: Methodist
- Ecclesiastical or organizational status: Closed

Location
- Location: Wyke Regis, Dorset, England
- Interactive map of Wyke Regis Methodist Church
- Coordinates: 50.5946°N 2.4758°W

Architecture
- Architects: Ford & Slater of Burslem
- Type: Church
- Style: Gothic
- Completed: 1903

Wyke Regis Methodist Church is a former Methodist church in Wyke Regis, Dorset, England. Designed by Ford & Slater of Burslem, it was built in 1903 and remained in use until 2021.

== History ==
The first Methodist place of worship in Wyke Regis was a cottage belonging to Richard Barnes at Shrubbery Lane, which was licensed for worship in 1804. A purpose-built Wesleyan-Methodist chapel was later built in 1832 at Collins Lane. It was described as a "simple single-storey rectangular building", which was later incorporated into a bakery. The bakery, including the former chapel, was demolished in 2003 to make way for the construction of a bungalow.

In 1893, plans for a new chapel were made under the then-Superintendent of the Weymouth circuit, Rev. W. Nicholson. The 1832 chapel was considered inadequate to meet the needs of the growing population, particularly following the establishment of the Whitehead Torpedo Works in 1891, which resulted in an influx of new workers to the area. In 1891, the population of Wyke Regis was 888 and by 1903 it had reached 1,910.

Fundraising towards the building fund soon commenced and by September 1894, a plot of land was purchased on Portland Road for £120. Messrs. Ford and Slater of Burslem drew up the plans for the new chapel, with accommodation provided for 150 people. An attached schoolroom was included as part of the scheme, with accommodation for up to 150 children. The chapel and schoolroom were to be connected by folding doors, providing the chapel with space for an additional 100 people if required. The estimated cost of the scheme was £1,100.

Construction of the new chapel was carried out under Rev. Nicholson's successor, Rev. J. Perrett. A meeting was held at Weymouth's Maiden Street Chapel on 1 April 1903 to consider the scheme in detail and authorise work to begin. Owing to the limited funds available, a decision was made to build the chapel first and add the proposed schoolroom at a later date, thereby reducing the cost down to £970. By June 1903, the Building Fund had £141 remaining after the purchase of land.

Construction began on 1 June 1903 when 18 memorial stones were laid at the site, in the presence of a large crowd of Wesleyans from Wyke Regis, Weymouth and Portland. The stones generated £73 towards the building fund, with additional collections on the day providing a further £27. The chapel, which was built by Mr. H. Hounsell of Weymouth, was declared open by Mrs. John White of Rodwell on 3 November 1903. At the time of opening, approximately £450 was left to be raised towards the cost.

With the merging of the Wesleyan, Primitive and United Methodists in 1932 to form the "Methodist Church", the chapel became Wyke Regis Methodist Church. In 1935, an attached schoolroom was built and the church itself underwent renovation and re-seating. The total cost of the scheme was £1,290 and the church was reopened by Mrs. S. Lovell on 8 May 1935. The debt from the project was cleared in October 1938 when the directors of Whitehead's Torpedo Works gifted £100.

In its final years of use, Wyke Regis Methodist Church formed part of the Dorset South & West Methodist Circuit, with the former schoolroom used as a hall and community space. The church closed in 2021 and a final service was held on 22 August. The church was then put up for sale pending redevelopment. In January 2024, planning permission to convert the church into flats was rejected by Dorset Council.

== Architecture ==
The church is built of red brick with Portland stone dressings and slate roofs. The pulpit of 1903 is made from pitch pine.
