= 37 Armoured Engineer Squadron =

37 Field Squadron RE / 37 Armoured Engineer Squadron RE
- Active: 1861 – 1885 (37 Depot Company RE) 1885 – 1907 (37 Field Company RE) 1915 (37 Fortress Company RE) 1915 – 1919 (37 Army Troops Company) 1948 – 1950 (37 Field Squadron- renamed 56 Field Squadron) 1950 – 2000 (New 37 Field Squadron formed) 2000 – 2018 (37 Armoured Engineer Squadron) 2018 – present (37 Field Squadron)
- Country: United Kingdom
- Branch: British Army
- Type: Engineering
- Role: Close Support
- Garrison/HQ: Catterick, North Yorkshire

37 Field Squadron is a sub-unit of the British Army's Royal Engineers. The squadron is commanded by 32 Engineer Regiment and provides close support engineering to the 4th Infantry Brigade. It is located in Marne Barracks, Catterick and has a long history.

== History ==
37 Field Squadron can trace its history back spanning three centuries to its original formation as the 37th Depot Company RE at Chatham on 1 April 1861. In the years that lead up to the present day, Sappers and Officers of 37 have fought in almost every war that the British Army has been engaged in. They have deployed in Europe, Africa, Asia, Australia and the Middle East.

=== The Boer War ===
The 37th Depot Company RE remained so until 1885, where its name changed to ‘D’ Depot Company RE and the number 37 was filled up by a service company. A new 37th Field Company RE formed in Aldershot in 1887 and served in the Curragh 1890–92, Shorncliffe 1892–94, Aldershot 1895–97, and Shorncliffe again from 1897 to 1899.

The Boers declared war in October 1899, and in November the 37th Field Company attached to the 5th Infantry Division embarked to the Cape. They were commanded by Captain W. A. Cairns and landed in Natal on 23 December 1899. With bolstered forces, in January 1900, Sir Redvers decided to attempt to take Ladysmith, outflanking the Boers by crossing the Tugela in the vicinity of Potgieter's Drift. Two divisions were detailed for this and the 37th Field Company were attached to the second.

The 37th established a ferry at Potgieer's Drift, by means of which part of the Second Division crossed to the north side of the Tugela, ready to flank Ladysmith. The 37th then turned their skills to blasting and building a road up the south side of Zwaartkop, a high hill to the south-east of Potgieter's Drift, overlooking Skiet's Drift. It was up this road on 2 February that the 37th helped haul two naval 12-prs guns to the top and carried the ammunition up by hand. Col. Irvine of A Pontoon Troop noted that “[t]he road up the hill was a very difficult one, and for 100 or 150 yards seemed almost impossible, as it went straight up the face of the kop at an angle of about thirty degrees.”

Their next tasking was digging the ramp on the south bank of a crossing near to Munger's Drift, which would open a road across the plain to Ladysmith. The entire time the men worked, the bridge was under enemy fire, but they were unable to move into cover and instead continued to dig. There was a delay from the bridge being completed to the Brigade crossing and in this interval the intensity of the fire increased. Irvine wrote that they “had to lie down when we heard it begin, and in a second or two the bullets would cut the water just in front of us from the bank to bank with a horrible hiss.” The bridge remained intact throughout the contact, however there were four casualties from the 37th Field Company, all shot on the bank whilst continuing digging. Of these, one man dies from his wounds. This is the first documented fatality of a member of the 37th since it was formed. Unfortunately at the time detailed records were not kept of sappers killed in action and whilst his name almost certainly can be found on the South African Memorial Arch (Boer War) in Chatham which name is his is still not known.

For the rest of the campaign, the 37th Field Company continued to be deployed on tasks with the Fifth Infantry Division, mainly building ramps for pontoons, dismantling bridges to be reused, or building roads for naval guns to be moved along. By 4 July 1891 they were halted at Volksrust having crossed the Drakensberg and were employed in constructing defences, and in repairing the railway line to Standerton. The war ended with the signing of the Treaty of Vereeniging on 31 May 1902 and the larger part of the Regimental units returned to England. By January 1903, 37th Field Company was one of only a few units stationed in South Africa. It finally returned in 1905, its new home Stobs Camp, Roxburghshire in Scotland from 1905 to 1906.

In 1907 many alterations were made to the Corps of Royal Engineers to bring it into line with the new organisation of the Army for service abroad and the 37th Field Company was disbanded.

=== 1915 – 1919 ===
37th Fortress Company was raised at Queenstown, Ireland in 1915 from half of 14 Survey Company, and later that same year changed to 37th Army Troops Company at Gallipoli. There is little written on the exact role that 37 had during this time. Three sections served on the island of Imbros, an island used mainly for water supply for Helles and ANZAC and as a rest camp; there was also a small advanced workshop for the beaches. There are discrepancies between different accounts as to where the main body was deployed, however the history of the Corps of Royal Engineers states that it was in Helles, where much of the engineering assets were involved in extending the trench systems or building and repairing piers.

The unit moved to Salonika in January 1916 under the command of Capt. C.B. Ede as a Base Unit. Again, little is known of its exact role, however most engineering tasks were centred around the construction of roads through the mountainous country, involving blasting through hillsides and constructing culverts and bridges over dry gaps that would turn to mountain torrents after every rainfall.

In September 1916 it worked with the 140th Army Troop and 95th Labour companies to make a road suitable for lorries that ran through Dorjan town and the battle belt to enable the attack upon Signal Allemand. The work was completed by the 23rd, when the first lorry travelled the route. The 37th Army Troop Company ended its time in Egypt and was once again disbanded in 1919.

=== 1950s ===
In 1948 in Ripon, Yorkshire, 37 Field Squadron was formed as part of 24 field Engineer Regiment, moving to Hong Kong from 1949 to 1950. The proclamation of the Communist Chinese People's Republic made a Red Army invasion likely and 37 Squadron was deployed with 40 Infantry Division to help secure the border. The types of tasks they would have been involved in where repairing mine fields and enhancing wire obstacles, constructing gun emplacements, command posts and observation posts all along the northern border, a 12-mile water pipeline, an All-weather road linking the villages of Tsun Wan and Sek Kong, and camps were also constructed, though it is not clear if 37 field Squadron had direct involvement in all of these tasks. In 1950 the squadron was re-designated as 56 Field squadron. A new 37 Field Squadron formed, and it is from this unit that the present 37 Armoured Engineer Squadron evolved, with no further disbandments.

Major Westlake RE took command of 37 Field Squadron in November 1950 at Invictor Lines, Maidstone. Initially they were a holding unit as new troops were posted into 25 Field Engineer Regiment operating from what was later to become the RHQ in Invictor Lines, but by December 1950 the regiment was complete and the squadron moved into its permanent offices in the lines. Training around the Maidston area ensued, and in March 1951 the squadron took part in a Brigade Exercise at Thetford. Maj B.A.E Maude MBE RE took command of the squadron in August 1951. Having completed the divisional Exercise, Ex. SURPRISE PACKET on Salisbury Plain, the squadron returned with news of their imminent departure for the Suez Canal Zone. On 26 October 1951, 37 Field Squadron emplaned at RAF Lyneham for Tripoli, then onto Benghazi. A short break for Christmas was enjoyed with the 16/5 Lancers before a road move to Tobruk on 28 December 1951. Here they took to the seas on the "Empire Comfort" to rejoin their Regiment in Dhekelia, Cyprus. Initially 37 Field Squadron deployed to Libya as replacement for 22 Regiment. In April 1952 the squadron, along with the rest of 25 Regiment, moved to the Suez Canal Zone, Egypt to be stationed at Moascar. These were times when the security of the Canal was considered essential to UK interests, but when there was growing opposition from Egyptian nationalists whose paramilitary groups carried out frequent and often grewsome attacks on British military and civilian personnel.

From October 1951 to 1954 Egyptian nationalist extremists became more openly hostile, with British fatal casualties totalling 520, of which 394 were service personnel, including 30 Royal Engineers, the third largest category after the RAOC and RA. The regiment was involved in security operations: blocking routes, protecting bridges, ferries and water filtration plants against attack, and supporting internal security measures like fencing and minefields, all in addition to a comprehensive training programme.

From July 1952 to June 1954 37 Field Squadron was located at Gothic Camp, El Ballah on detachment to 32 Guards Brigade (1st Scots Gds, 3rd Coldsteam Gds and 1st Beds & Herts). This period of 'freedom' from the regiment was much enjoyed and it was during this time that the squadron was handed over to the 2iC Capt B.G. Griffiths in February 1953, who picked up his majority one month later. Under his command the squadron took part in Op RODEO FLAIL, a tank loading operation at Port Said, pontoon building, constructing several semi-permanent Bailey bridges over the Sweetwater Canal (one of which at El Firdan – a 30EWBB – was 82m/270 ft long over two piers x 17m/55 ft high), exercises TRIANGLE and LONGBOW and several long-range desert patrols in GMC armoured trucks (typically well beyond the official limits of the Canal Zone!). 2iC to Maj Griffiths in mid 1953 was 2/Lt D. Croghan, a rare appointment for a national service officer (who was also the unit's bridging officer and MTO). At this same time two other officers out of a total of 5 were n/s, as were many of the ORs, to no disadvantage of the unit that was always in the van of the brigade's operations and 'schemes'.

In January 1955 37 Field Squadron embarked on the M. V. Georgic for the UK, under the command of the 2iC Capt Grosse. It was from sometime between January and June 1955 that 37 Field Squadron gained their mascot "Noddy". This elephant figurine with a nodding head was acquired by allegedly nefarious means from the brewery company Fremlins Ltd.

That company shared the town of Maidstone with the squadron. The brewery subsequently allowed them to keep the elephant, and it toured with the squadron on all their operations for the next fifteen years or so. Noddy still sits in the Squadron Headquarters corridor to this day, with an image of an Elephant being the emblem for 37 Armoured Engineer Squadron.

In 1954 the United Nations turned down an application by Greece for the self-determination of Cyprus, and widespread rioting ensued. By April 1955 the EOKA (the National Organisation of Cypriot Combatants) had begun a campaign on the island to rid it of British Rule. A state of Emergency was declared in June 1955 and more British troops were deployed to the island. By autumn 1955 it became apparent that the troops would still be there over the winter, and so 37 Field Squadron under the command of Major B.J. Coombe RE, were deployed to help with the winterisation of the temporary camps on 1 November, arriving on 11th. There were regular attacks made on the detachments of the squadron working in the Troodos Mountains, and on 15 December the OC was ambushed by four people, and his driver, LCpl J.B. Morum was killed. Maj. Coombe managed to single-handedly take on the enemy with a sten machine carbine. When his ammunition was expended he returned from his firing position to the vehicle and retrieved his driver's Sten, moved back to his firing position and continued his attack, when this ran out he drew his pistol and covered his opponents for 30 minutes. He killed one, wounded two and when the fourth attempted to escape he stopped him at 70 yards with his last three rounds. He was awarded the George Medal for his actions, where his citation said that he "displayed courage and initiative of the very highest order".

After the winterisation was complete, the squadron turned to bridge repairs and the construction of a radar site at Pomos Point. Within this time the squadron suffered other losses, Spr R.P.Melson (Bob) was wounded when his truck was ambushed near Petra, he died in hospital of bomb wounds on 24 November 1955. Spr P.H.Percival was killed when a large boulder was rolled down an embankment into the path of his 2 Troop truck on 26 Nov 1955. 37 Field Squadron left Cyprus on the M.V.Devonshire on 26 February 1956, heading for the Invicta Lines, Maidstone.

On their return 37 continued with their training, taking part in an atomic blast simulation, HGB builds and a 288 ft class 30 EWBPS build, bridge demolitions and work on the Kings Ferry in October 1956 during the Wyke Regis Training Area Bridging Camp. One month later and the squadron deployed to Malta to participate in the Suez operations of 1956 where among other tasks they constructed Nissen huts at Salima. They returned to Maidstone in 1957 where they dismantled a bridge in Sheppy in March of that year, before taking part in the filming of ‘Dunkirk’ in April 1957. Following this, in July they replaced several small Bailey bridges in Norfolk with piled trestle bridges. Soon afterwards, in August 1957 they were deployed to Christmas Island when it became reactivated to run a continuous programme of ‘H’Bomb test's as part of the British Nuclear programme, testing kiloton and megaton devices.

The Engineer requirement for the programme was construction of a variety of laboratories, weapon assembly and tests sheds, decontamination houses and photographic processing workshops. Most had to be air-conditioned to strict tolerance limits and an elaborate piped water system was set up that could run at a variety of set temperatures. It is unclear exactly which tasks the squadron personal undertook, but as one of the major RE units posted to the island it is likely that they had a large input into the construction of the 50,000 ft scientific facilities constructed in the nine months the programme ran for. During this deployment in 1957 Spr Jerkins died of drowning, and was buried at sea. The squadron's parting gift to the islanders was the construction of a children's playground in London Village before leaving in February 1958.

On 15 August 1958, Sgt K. Bamforth of 1 Troop, 37 field Squadron, was presented the British Empire Medal by Lt. Gen. Sir Edwin L. Morris KCB, OBE, MC. for meritorious military service worthy of recognition by the Crown. In 1958, the squadron moved to Osnabruck, Germany, as part of the British Army of the Rhine (BAOR).

=== 1960s – 1980s ===
In contrast with the previous decades, 37 Field Squadron was able to slow down somewhat as it entered the 1960s. It would be another twelve years before the squadron deployed on an operation, and instead the years were filled with numerous training exercises and sports.

37 Field Squadron enjoyed its centenary in 1961, with a parade held on 16 May with Brigadier P.H. Man inspecting the Troops. Here there is a jump in the history to the 1970s where 37 Field Squadron served in Northern Ireland with 39 Infantry Brigade on an Operation BANNER tour in the Infantry role in Belfast from March to July 1972. They returned again to Northern Ireland from November 1973 to March 1974 carrying out an independent operation DESCANT tour, this time in the engineer role supporting 8 Infantry Brigade in the Derry area.

In 1976 the squadron came under the command of 35 Engineer Regiment, as it remains to this day. As part of this restructure it moved from Osnabruck to Gordon Barracks in Hameln. On 1 December 1977 the whole regiment was re-designated 4 Armoured Division Engineer Regiment, and as part of that they resumed the Infantry role once again in the Armagh this time, on Op BANNER from December 1977 to 1978 with 3 Infantry Brigade. They returned to Germany until called back for an Op DESCANT tour in Ballykelly with 8 Infantry Brigade in June 1980.

=== 1990s ===
In December 1990, 37 Field Squadron deployed to the Gulf on Operation GRANBY as part of the 32 Armoured Engineer Brigade, 1 Division. They had as part of their assets an NBC reconnaissance unit equipped with Fuchs vehicles. During an advance of nearly 350 km in 97 hours of virtually non-stop fighting and driving, the division has destroyed the Iraqi 46 Mechanised Brigade elements of at least three Iraqi Infantry divisions.

In November 1992, 37 Field Squadron deployed from Hameln to Tomislavsgrad (TSG) in Bosnia on Op GRAPPLE, as part of the United Nations protection Force (UNPROFOR). The squadron's principal role during this operation was to open a Main Supply Route called Route Triangle that crossed the mountains to Gorni Vakuf and Vitez.

37 Field Squadron returned from Bosnia, rejoining the regiment for a short time before being deployed for its last time to Northern Ireland on an Operation DESCANT tour in September 1994. 4 and 5 troop did search based in Antrim and 6 troop were construction based at the maze, the Artillery were responsible for guarding the prison . 6 troop and support troop worked, building the new guard towers at the maze, and various security bases round the province.

35 Engineer Regiment, including 37, deployed during 1995 to Ploce on the Op GRAPPLE surge. The regiment as a whole built a camp for 24 Air Mobile Brigade, for which the Commanding Officer Lt Col NMH Fairclough RE got his OBE. In March 1998 the squadron, along with the rest of the regiment, deployed to the Former Republic of Yugoslavia on Operation LODESTAR/PALETINE, as part of the NATO led stabilisation force (SFOR). They returned again in October 1999 with an armoured troop from 77 Armoured Engineer Squadron attached for a six-month tour.

=== 2000s ===
In January 2000 as part of a strategic Defence Review, 35 Engineer Regiment moved to Barker Barracks in Paderborn. In April of the same year 37 Field Squadron re-rolled to its present formation as 37 Armoured Engineer Squadron. In September of the same year, the squadron deployed on Exercise ULAN EAGLE in Poland with 20 Armoured Brigade. In January 2001, the squadron deployed to Kenya on Ex OAK APPLE, a construction exercise in Naivasha. They performed Troop tasks, constructing buildings and latrines for a camp. After an Adventurous Training break, they continued construction work, this time building a school, and dog kennels and shower and latrine blocks for the local Army units, whilst Support Troop dug waterholes for the wildlife.

In September of the same year a troop deployed to Oman on Ex SAIF SAREEA as the Royal Engineers Neutral Organisation (RENO) troop. They returned in time to deploy at short notice with the remainder of the squadron once again to Kenya on another construction tour this time in Meru National Park on Ex OAK APPLE 2, in January 2002. This time around Support Troop worked on the building of Kanjoo School. Armoured Troop built a Non-Equipment Bridge for easier access to the school. After some Adventure Training, the squadron held a fun run, charity auction and other fund raising events to enable the school to buy new desks and books.

32 personnel from the squadron deployed on Op TELIC 1 with 28 and 32 Engineer Regiments whilst the rest of the squadron took to the Green Goddesses deploying on Op FRESCO to cover the fireman's strike in the Birmingham area. Elements went to Canada for Ex WARPAINT and Ex MEDMAN 1, with the full Squadron joining them for Ex MEDMAN 2 in June 2003.

Following this busy period the squadron, commanded by Major A.Hilton, were again warned for operations in Iraq and deployed two months earlier than planned in November 2003 on Op TELIC 3. They were initially divisional troops but then reverted to OPCOM 35 Engineer Regiment. Based in the AL Basra and Maysan area, the squadron were responsible for overseeing the reconstruction of the 400Kva and 132Kva electrical transmission lines, force protection and construction tasks as well as solid waste removal and upgrading the recently destroyed sewage system in the city of Basra.

A search troop and RESAT group were also detached to 77 Armoured Engineer Squadron and the US Army in BAGHDAD respectively. In January 2004, 86 personnel from both 73 and 75 Engineer Regiment (V) respectively were mobilised to deploy to Iraq and became fully integrated with 37 Armoured Engineer Squadron on 9 January 2004.

The tour did not go without loss for 37 Armoured Engineer Squadron. On 31 January 2004, 22-year-old Spr Rab Thompson was killed in an accident in Basra when an excavation he was working and collapsed. His memory is maintained by the ‘Rab Thompson Cup’ – An annual inter-troop games competition.

37 returned to Paderborn, though during the beginning of 2005 elements deployed to Cyprus as part of Op TOSCA. In October 2006 the squadron undertook training with the 1 PWRR Battle Groups in Poland on exercise ULAN EAGLE.

In April 2006 the squadron again deployed to Iraq on Operation TELIC 8, this time stationed in Shaibah Logistics Base (SLB) and Basra Air Station (BAS). Later in the tour the squadron deployed into Basra City, working from Basra Palace, as part of Op SINBAD, which involved the repair of schools, hospitals and other public amenities. The squadron, along with the help of the RAF, pioneered a new way of replacing damaged or looted pylons that were having a drastic impact on the quality of life for the Iraqis. A Chinook helicopter lifted the 4.5 tonnes pylons from BAS and flew them to location where sappers from 37 and Iraqi Engineers were on the ground ready to fix them down. They erected a total of 30 pylons using this method.

During the Tour 37 decided to honour British soldiers who had lost their lives on Op TELIC. They built the BASRA Memorial wall outside the front of the Headquarters of the Multi-National Division (south-East). The sappers Worked often in their own time, into the night after a day on task, to complete the wall before the end of their tour, and they fixed onto it plaques bearing the name of every fallen soldier. In March 2008 the squadron, commanded by Major A. Devey RE, deployed to Gibraltar on Ex 29th SHOT, where they completed the difficult and dangerous demolition of a Second World War observation post (OP) 300 ft up the Rock of Gibraltar. During the 8 weeks construction tour they deconstructed the OP by hand whilst being roped on. Other tasks completed during the exercise were the upgrading of the historical Garrison Library Kitchen, and the stair access inside St Michael's Cave was repaired. They erected a church bell in St Bernard's Church that had been donated by the RAF, and were able to participate in the Freedom of Gibraltar. On return from Gibraltar it was time for the squadron to once again prepare itself for a deployment, this time on Op TELIC 13 under the command of Maj. A.A Garrow RE. 37 arrived in Iraq at the end of November 2008 with two distinct roles to fulfil. The first was to act as a Boat Troop, operating out of FOB OXFORD and enabling 1PWRR to patrol and influence the March areas at the back of the Contingency Operating Base (COB). These patrols were vital in clearing the area of insurgents, as its location had previously been used on numerous occasions for launching indirect fire into the COB. The only access to the area was via the waterways, and so Boat Troop worked tirelessly to maintain and man the boats for the daily patrols.

The other two troops' main role was construction. It was announced during the tour that Op TELIC 13 would be the last deployment of British troops to Iraq, and therefore the Engineers had to ensure that it was left in a state to allow easy handover to both the Americans and the Iraqis. The early task involved the two troops moving out independently into the city of Basra to upgrade existing FOB's and to give force protection to Iraqi police stations. The troops worked with Iraqi civilian contractors to build HESCO bastion walls and sangars, and to upgrade amenities.

Attention was then turned inside of the COB, with the majority of the squadron tasked with the sensitive demolition of the divisional internment facility, when this was complete, 37 then raised an ammunition handling area for the US Army in its place, and de-constructed the old ammunition compound. Smaller tasks were also completed, with helicopter landing pads constructed a radar pad built, and outside of the COB sections deploying to strip out FOB's ready for the imminent departure.

In the last weeks of the tour 37 were kept particularly busy. They went out on three bridging operations in a little over a week, one of which was a two night operation repairing the main bridge over the Shat Al Arab waterway. Those not bridging had the high-profile task of taking down Basra Memorial Wall. It was decided by the prime minister that the bricks and plaques would be removed to the UK, where it would be resurrected as a permanent memorial to those who lost their lives during Operation TELIC. It was fitting that it was the same squadron who had built the wall that had the task of taking it down again, even more so that some of the squadron members were involved in both.

With the wall taken down, the Basra Air Base handed over to the US Army, 37 Armoured Engineer Squadron returned to Germany in May 2009. There was a short break for some leave and adventurous training. After the section and recce competitions, the sub-unit deployed to Salisbury Plain on Ex DRUIDS DANCE to support 1RGR, where, over the three-week period, the squadron built 21 bridges including a double story MGB.

=== 2010s ===
From October 2011 to May 2012 the sub-unit was deployed on Operation HERRICK 15 in Afghanistan. Since then, the sub-unit has completed a construction tour in Kenya in early 2015 and Ex PRAIRIE STORM in Canada in Jul 2016. In 2017, the sub-unit then moved into the forefront of NATO high readiness as part of the VJTF(L), conducting exercises in Canada, Germany and Denmark, as well as supporting smaller exercises in Latvia, Romania, USA and UK. In addition to this core commitment, the sub-unit has also supported Op SHADER with Mobility Support Training Teams working to develop the capability of the Iraqi Security Forces. In June 2018 the squadron exercised the Freedom of Paderborn with 20th Armoured Infantry Brigade.

In the summer of 2018, 35 Engineer Regiment re-roled to EOD&S, the sub-unit moved from Barker Barracks in Paderborn, Germany, to Marne Barracks in Catterick, North Yorkshire. 37 Armoured Engineer Squadron became 37 Field Squadron and became part of 32 Engineer Regiment. The sub-unit was deployed to the Falkland Islands as part of Project ANEMOI from Feb-Oct 2019.
