= Weymouth Bay Methodist Church =

Church in Weymouth, Dorset, England

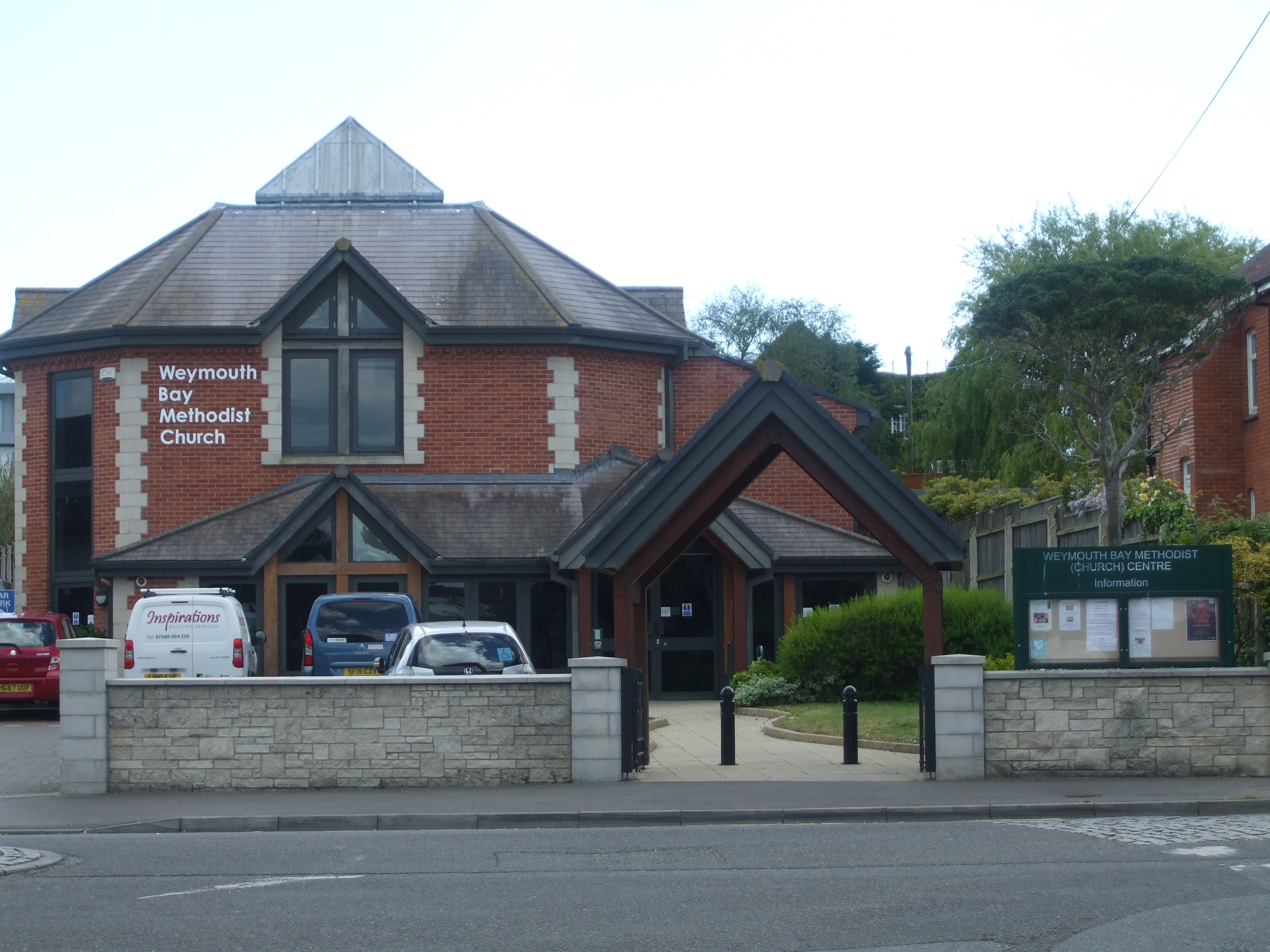

Religion
- Affiliation: Methodist
- Ecclesiastical or organizational status: Active

Location
- Location: Weymouth, Dorset, England
- Interactive map of Weymouth Bay Methodist Church
- Coordinates: 50.6228°N 2.4481°W

Architecture
- Architect: Saunders Architects of Southampton
- Type: Church
- Completed: 2009

Weymouth Bay Methodist Church is a Methodist church in Weymouth, Dorset, England. It was built in 2008–09 to replace the Maiden Street Methodist Church of 1866–1870 which was gutted by fire in 2002.

== History ==
Weymouth's Methodist circuit originally occupied a church at Maiden Street, which was built in 1866–1870. The church underwent a £160,000 restoration in 1999, but was gutted by fire in January 2002. Owing to the high costs of restoring the building, the congregation supported the construction of a new church. A site at Melcombe Avenue was purchased in 2005, occupied by a former Christian Science Church, and the Maiden Street church was sold for development in 2006.

Plans for the new church, able to accommodate 240 people, were drawn up by Saunders Architects of Southampton. It was designed as a multi-use building, functioning also as a meeting space for community groups and a venue for performance and exhibitions. The congregation used St Nicholas' Church in Buxton Road and then Westham Methodist Church until the new church was built.

The original planning application for the church was rejected by Weymouth & Portland Borough Council in February 2006 over concerns of the building's "overbearing impact" on neighbouring properties and its potential to "adversely affect the character of the area". Revised plans were then approved in April 2006, which included the removal of the intended third storey and a reduction of the height of the church.

Construction of the church began in October 2007 by Acheson Construction of Dorchester. The foundation stone was laid by Rev. David Plume on 1 March 2008. The £2.5 million Weymouth Bay Methodist Church was opened on 25 March 2009 by Rev. Stephen Poxon, the President of the Methodist Conference. The opening of the church saw the uniting of the congregations of the Maiden Street and Westham Churches.

== Architecture ==
The church is built of red brick, with quoins and dressings of Portland stone and Welsh slate on the roofs. The two-storey church has an octagonal roof and pyramid roof light, with a hipped roof over the rear section and a single-storey front porch. The ground floor contains the sanctuary, side chapel, foyer, vestry, Sunday school room, meeting room, kitchen and toilets. The first floor has a gallery overlooking the sanctuary and a hall. The church received the 2009 Weymouth Civic Society award, who praised the "thoughtful design", "impressive interior" and "excellent community facilities".
