= All Saints Church of England Academy, Wyke Regis =

All Saints Church of England Academy

Location
- Sunnyside Road; Wyke Regis; Weymouth, Dorset, DT4 9BJ; England
- Coordinates: 50.59665°N 2.47386°W

Information
- Type: Academy
- Religious affiliation: Church of England
- Local authority: Dorset Council
- Trust: Ambitions Academy Trust
- Department for Education URN: 147214 Tables
- Ofsted: Reports
- Principal: Helen Cullen
- Gender: Coeducational
- Age: 11 to 16
- Enrolment: 830
- Houses: Endeavour, Discovery, Challenger, Enterprise
- Colours: Red, Black & Gold
- Website: http://www.allsaints.dorset.sch.uk/

All Saints Church of England Academy (formerly All Saints Church of England School) is a coeducational secondary school located in Wyke Regis in the English county of Dorset.

It is a Church of England school within the Diocese of Salisbury. Previously a voluntary aided school administered by Dorset Council, in June 2019 All Saints Church of England School converted to academy status and was renamed All Saints Church of England Academy. The school is now sponsored by the Ambitions Academy Trust.

All Saints Church of England Academy offers GCSEs and BTECs as programmes of study for pupils. The school also offers a range of extra-curricular activities including the Duke of Edinburgh's Award.
