= Wyke Regis War Memorial =

War memorial in Weymouth, Dorset, England

Coordinates: 50.5996°N 2.4787°W

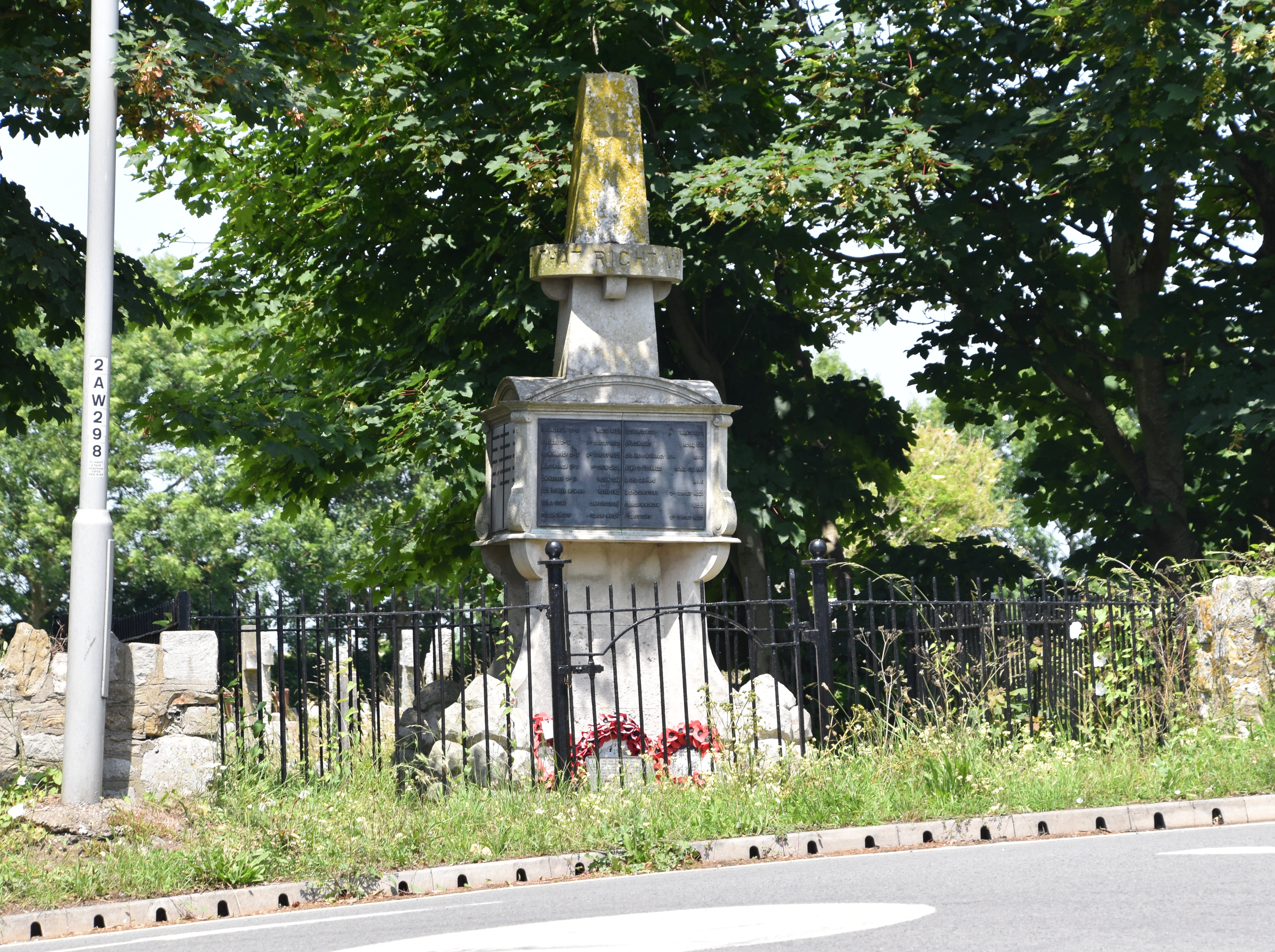
Wyke Regis War Memorial, seen facing Wyke Road.

The Wyke Regis War Memorial is a World War I war memorial located in Wyke Regis, Weymouth, Dorset, England. Facing Wyke Road from the edge of Wyke Regis Cemetery, the memorial has been Grade II listed since December 2016.

The memorial was unveiled on 30 November 1919 and had cost just over £200, which was raised by public subscription. Built of Portland stone, it is described as having a Neo-Baroque style by Historic England. The memorial is a stone obelisk, set on a stone base, with a large pedestal containing four brass panels, commemorating the lives of 52 local men. Above the pedestal is an inscribed stone ring. The brass panels were created by employees of the village's Whitehead Torpedo Factory.
