= Stobs Military Camp =

Coordinates: 55.377°N 2.793°W

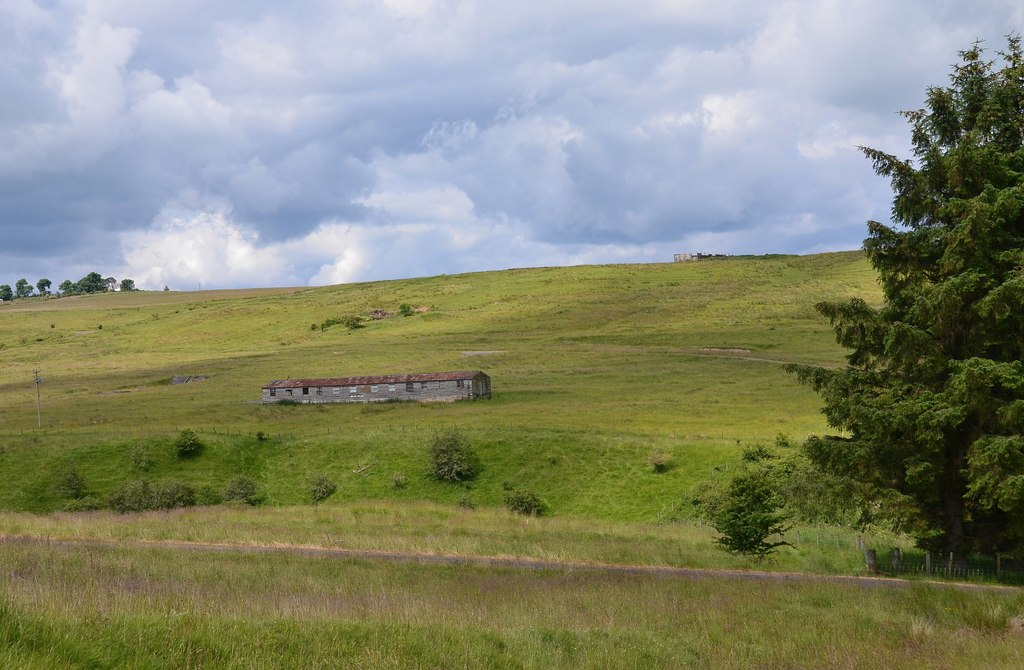
Hut at Stobs Camp near Hawick

Stobs Camp is a military and internment camp located just outside Hawick in the Scottish Borders. It is an internationally important site due to its level of preservation, being the best preserved World War 1 camp in Britain.

== Geography ==
Stobs estate, surrounded by hills, was an ideal location for an internment camp as "there were few easy ways out of it for any potential escapees." There were several escapes recorded in the local papers but most escapees were recaptured within a few days. Several postcards from an earlier date when it was a training camp mention it as "very hilly country" and "all Hills for miles". The farms comprising the estate were listed as Barns, Newton, Dodburn & Whitewellbrae, Acreknowe & Turn, Winningtonrig, Newmill & Horsley, North and South Berryfell, the Home Farm of Stobs, and the castle and policies [gardens, etc.]

== History ==
=== Prewar ===
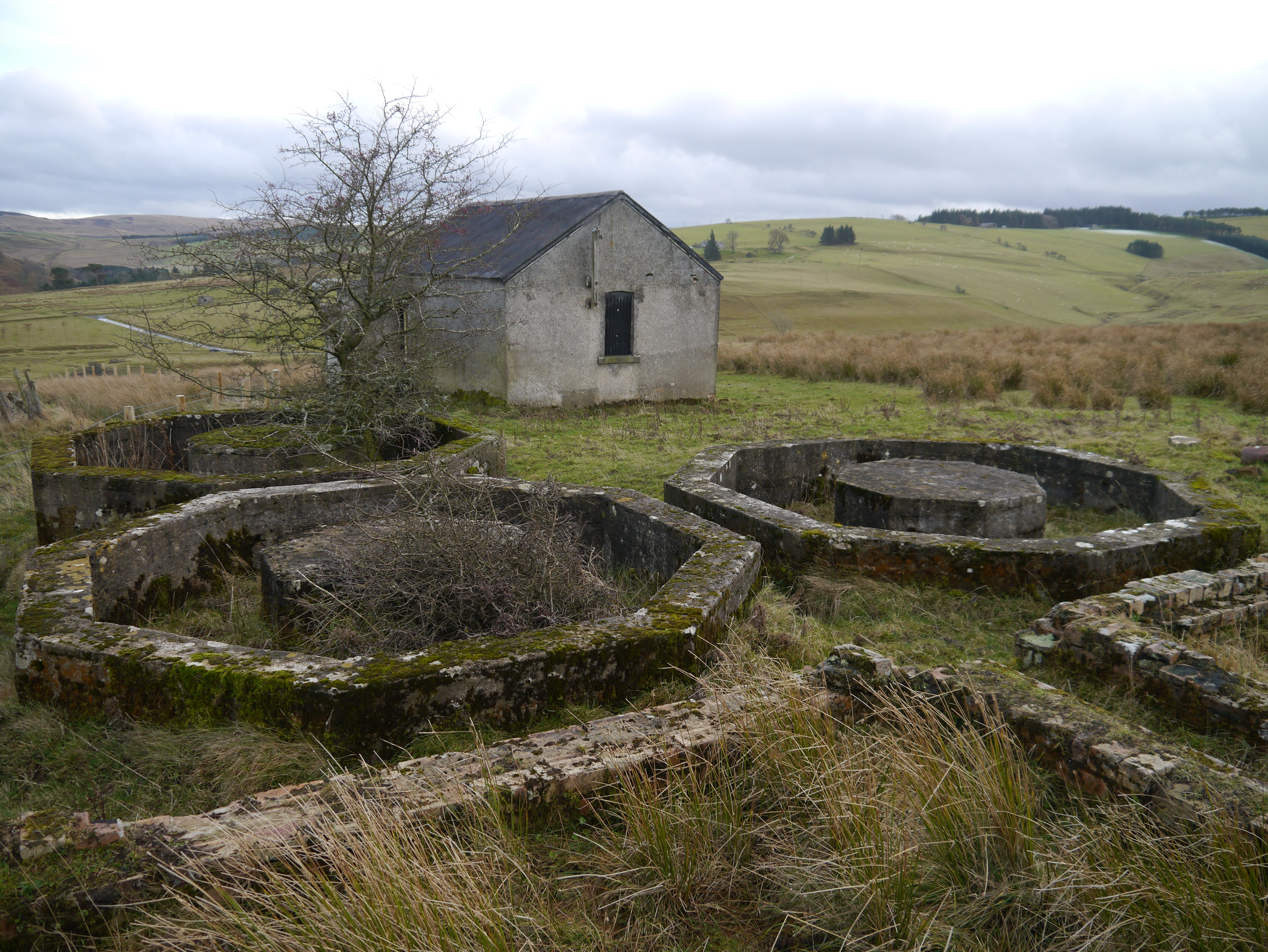
Octagonal tanks at Stobs Camp

The Stobs estate was sold by Robert Purdon, a solicitor in Hawick, on 21 November 1902. The sale of the 3615 acres of Stobs Estate is recorded in several newspapers and the Southern Reporter of 11 October 1902 announces “The British Government has purchased the ancient Border home of the Elliotts at Stobs Castle.” It goes on to add in the edition of 27 November 1902 that “The War Office is understood have decided to erect barracks on part of Stobs estate, and to maintain a permanent garrison there.”

In its early years men stationed at Stobs Camp were under canvas, with the Officers' quarters being near Stobs Castle. There are many postcards which portray the camp with lines of bell tents. Other than the railway structure and a YMCA hut, there were few permanent structures.

The influx of so many troops raised concern amongst locals over how the infrastructure would cope with this addition of so many men and the impact it might have on the town's traditions. In the Hawick Burgh Minutes of 27 October 1902, a special council was held to discuss the protection of the town's water supply "from pollution through any operation connected with the proposed military Camp at Stobs". Locals thought it would lower the tone of the community. In a Hawick Callant's Club meeting it is noted that "the abiding sense of generation linked to generation – these things might be seriously impaired and old established customs in which they were embodied and by which they were symbolised might be neglected, overlaid, and finally lost". There was discussion over calling the camp Hawick Military Camp but the conclusion was reached that this would cause confusion, so Stobs Camp was born.

The first regular troops at Stobs Camp are recorded as being there in June 1903; they were the First Battalion Queen's Own Cameron Highlanders. Postcards from July 1903 refer to the size of the camp: "a very small part of the camp's 30,000 men" and "a very small bit of the camps 20,000 men here." Many of the men arrived by train, and correspondence from the North British Railway Company refers to the development of sidings, signals and platforms at Stobs.

Though many battalions came and trained at Stobs Camp there were times when it was little used, for example in 1908: Army returns that year show that there was only one full-size regular infantry battalion stationed there. In 1909 complaints were received in regard to the disuse of Stobs. The Scotsman of 22 September 1913 noted "for the first time there have been no Territorials there". In 1912 the Highland Light Infantry and Royal Scots trained there, and in 1914 it was used for Officers Training Camps. Despite the fluctuating use of Stobs Camp there was a permanent staff base there from June 1903 until October 1912. At the outbreak of war all troops were ordered back to their headquarters.

==== Prewar life at Camp ====
We get a glimpse into the soldiers' lives from the many postcards that survive. These have images of dancing, YMCAs, Guild tents, church services, the camp, and soldiers doing various tasks. They write home mentioning sports days and the occasional concert. One writes "in Hawick last night on Pass". A majority talk of having a very good time. This feeling was not shared by all, as other postcards talk of being homesick and having a rough time.

Camp life was also hard work. Postcards depict engineers building fortifications, troop marches, and soldiers washing dishes. One soldier writes home describing a 10-mile march and how they "are feeling our feet very much". Exercises included sham fights, bayonet training, and much more. Another writes home "We were out all night last week we walked about 22 miles then had a sham fight". These were all in attempt to get the soldiers ready for battle but as Jessie Crawford expressed in her diary "little did they think that the next war would be fought in trenches".

=== World War 1 ===
During the beginning of 1914 Stobs became important once again as a training camp. After hosting a series of Officers' Training Corps it became an internment camp for "aliens" and then a prisoner of war camp, developing into "the HQ camp for all POW camps in Scotland". The Scotsman reported on 2 November 1914 that "Arrangements are being completed for interning a large number of German prisoners". Finally, civilian prisoners were transferred to Knockaloe on the Isle of Man and from July 1916 until the end of the war Stobs was purely a military prisoner of war camp.

Internees were transferred from all over the UK; some volunteered for internment, and others were interned for their own safety. Many Germans and Austrians were interned for their own safety though "the official line was that the measures had been undertaken to safeguard the nation against internal spies". A civilian camp until Spring 1915, it then became a mixed with the addition of military until July 1916.

==== WW1 life at Camp ====
It was announced in The Scotsman of 2 November 1914 that the intention was to build 100 huts for prisoners of war. Each of these huts was to be a double hut providing accommodation for “a total of 6000.” The camp was built with four compounds comprising 80 huts which could accommodate 4,500 men. Buildings included a hospital, operating block, mortuary, bakery, post offices, cook houses, bath houses, workshops, and a canteen. There was only one small hiccup in the construction of the camp when a joiners strike was held in April 1915; the government responded quickly and the next day a detachment of Royal Engineers arrived at the camp to continue construction as reported by the Southern Reporter.

A prisoner wrote in the Stobsiade, the camp newspaper, “anyone who has gazed longingly through the barbed wire fence into the distant blue sky in summer, knows how important a lecture, a concert, a play, a competition is for our mental and physical well-being.” They set up a school which had 3,500 pupils pass through it, held lectures on various subjects, had a gymnastics team, and held various other activities. These activities helped them to no longer feel like prisoners as Ketchum remarks “one cannot be consciously a prisoner while playing centre forward on a football team or translating Goethe in class.“

The Stobsiade amongst other things had a puzzle corner and advertisements for services within the camp. This was a censored paper but the proceeds went to buy tools for the workshops, books for the camp library and other projects around the camp. The prisoners manufactured their own artwork which they were allowed to sell in Hawick. Some of the soldiers at the camp kept gardens Private Valentine writes to the Scotsman of 29 January 1916 saying “I have a primrose plant in my garden here….27th of December last, and is still blossoming merrily.” Overall it seems that the prisoners were fairly cheerful despite being interned.

Inevitably some of the prisoners died, from wounds, disease or by their own hand, and the authorities allowed them to construct their own cemetery on land outside the camp. In total 46 prisoners and civilians were buried at Stobs, and the first prisoner of war who died at Stobs is buried in Wilton Cemetery.

Though prisoners enjoyed many freedoms their letters were all censored. It was the responsibility of the Interpreters to check all mail coming in and going out including parcels. A majority of the letters were to or from home but on one occasion there is a postcard sent from brother to brother within the camp. A prisoner remarked “sometimes a letter comes flying over the barbed wire. From Germany or from the English home. It does not say what we actually want to know. Of course not.”

The poet Marion Angus worked at Stobs during the war. Her poem "Penchrise", first published in her collection The Tinker's Road and Other Verses (1924), was inspired by the moorland landscape around the camp.

After the prisoners left in late 1919 after the First World War it was locals who tended to the graveyard. Mrs Borthwick, a local, remembers a man coming to visit his son's grave every year until his own death. In the 1960s the German War Grave Commission had the bodies removed to the German Cemetery at Cannock Chase, Staffordshire.

=== Interwar ===
After World War One, except for occasional busy years like 1924, Stobs camp started to diminish as a training camp. In 1921 a list of summer training camps was published and none were to be held at Stobs. Later in 1921 and in 1922 buildings were sold off or removed. In 1926 and 1928 the railway began to reduce the size of the siding that was there. A fire in one of the Royal Engineer stores in May 1936 practically destroyed the building. In 1937 it was decided to use the camp in a different way as a camp for boys from poorer families, this must have been unsuccessful because it was never used in this way again. The year 1934 saw the Black Watch regiment training there. In March 1938 it hosted the Ayrshire Yeomanry, and in July 1939 it was used as a temporary training centre for Militiamen. After these brief spurts of activity, it continued to decline.

=== Second World War ===
Unlike World War One, World War Two seems to be “cloaked in a veil of secrecy.” There are few images depicting the camp and information is sparse. It became a training camp at the outbreak of the War and regiments included the Cameronians, Royal Scots Fusiliers, King's Own Yorkshire Light Infantry, Royal Artillery, Pioneer Corps, Royal Norfolk Regiment, Suffolk Regiment, Yorks & Lancs, and others. Searchlight training and D-day training both took place at the camp and it is possible that tank training also took place near Shankend a little to the east of the camp. A few new buildings were also constructed on site including many Nissen huts.

=== Postwar [1945–1962] ===
After the Second World War, usage of the camp changed again in response to the Polish Resettlement Act of 27 March 1947. It became a resettlement camp for Polish troops. The Polish groups that were there were 2nd Corps, Heavy Artillery (9th and 10th), and it was also host to the Corps Artillery Headquarters. There is evidence of Polish troops being there until 1950.

After the 1950s, Stobs was expanded. Further land was bought in 15162 acres. There was a lot of Territorial activity there during the 1950s especially during the Korean War. The last military activity that is recorded was in 1955, although it was not until 1957 that it was announced Stobs was to close. The Hawick News stated on 19 June 1959 "the War Department have informed the County Council that dismantling at Stobs is nearly complete".

=== Scheduled monument ===
In April 2023, Historic Environment Scotland announced that the camp had been designated a scheduled monument. This followed a public consultation which received 90 responses "overwhelmingly in support" of the designation.
