= Maiden Street Methodist Church =

Church in Dorset, England

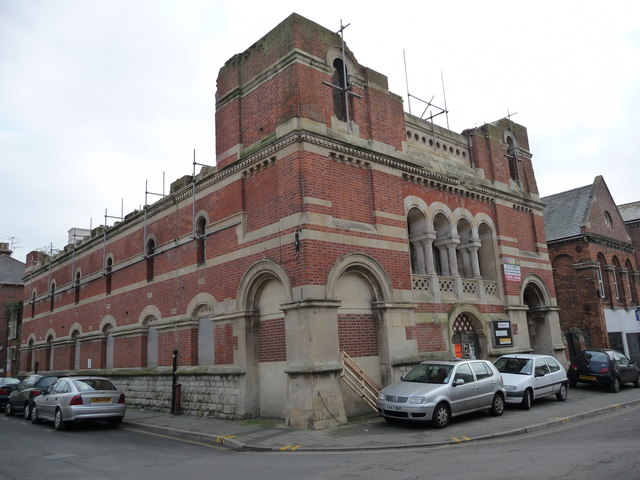
- The ruined church in 2008.

Religion
- Affiliation: Methodist

Location
- Location: Weymouth, Dorset, England
- Interactive map of Maiden Street Methodist Church
- Coordinates: 50.6076°N 2.4536°W

Architecture
- Architects: Foster and Wood
- Type: Church
- Style: Lombard
- Completed: 1867

Maiden Street Methodist Church is a former Methodist church in Weymouth, Dorset, England. It was built in 1866–67 to the designs of Foster and Wood of Bristol. The church was the victim of fire in 2002 and was subsequently replaced by the Weymouth Bay Methodist Church which opened in 2009. The church, which is a Grade II* listed building, remains a ruin and awaits redevelopment.

== History ==
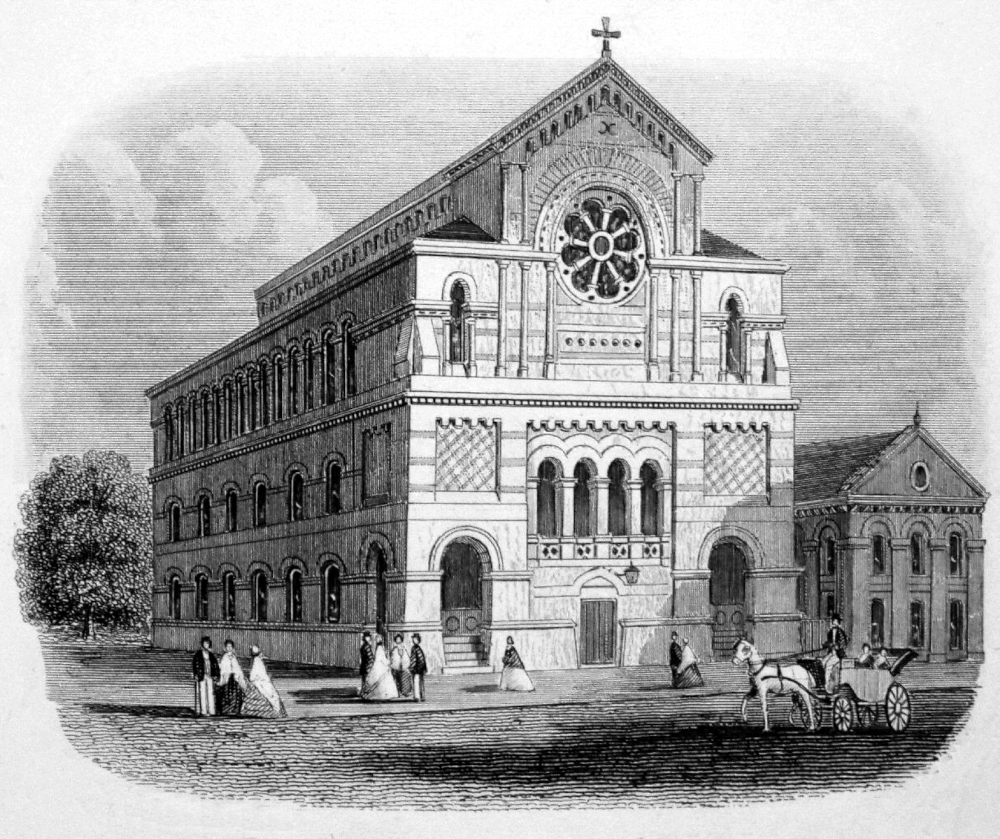
Illustration of Maiden Street Methodist Church from circa 1870.

The church on Maiden Street was constructed in 1866–67 as a Wesleyan-Methodist Church on a site that was once home to the King's Head Inn. The foundation stone was laid by William Dingley of Sherborne on 28 June 1866. It was built by Stephen Brown of Weymouth to the designs of Messrs. Foster and Wood of Bristol for a cost of £3,700. The church opened for Divine worship on 12 December 1867, with seated accommodation for 1,000 people. The church underwent internal alterations in 1955 and a £160,000 restoration was carried out in 1998-99.

=== 2002 fire and redevelopment proposals ===
In January 2002, the church was a victim of fire, which left it as a roofless shell. The cause of the fire was not determined, but due to the high costs of restoring the building, the local Methodist circuit opted to build a new church and the Weymouth Bay Methodist Church was completed in 2009. After the fire, the remains of the interior were cleared, as Weymouth & Portland Borough Council, English Heritage and structural engineers worked together to ensure the ruin was made safe. The interior was replaced with scaffolding to support the shell.

The church was added to English Heritage's Heritage at Risk Register in 2004, and was put up for sale in 2006. It was sold to the development company Project 20 who, in 2007, obtained planning permission to restore part of the church and build a new building within its shell. A restaurant was planned for the ground floor, with fifteen residential units located within the levels above. However, no work started and despite an extension of the original planning permission being granted in 2010, the site remained undeveloped.

The building was sold again in 2016 to Cranbourne (Weymouth) Ltd. Planning permission was granted in 2019 for a new scheme whereby the facade would be rebuilt, the rest of the church's ruins preserved and a new building built within to hold 25 one-bedroom apartments. The former minister's house was also to be retained and restored as a three-bedroom house. Work did not start on the scheme and the church was put up for sale in 2020.

== Architecture ==
The church is built of red brick, with dressings in Portland stone. Ornamental details included a large rose window added to each gable. It was intended to embellish the north-west corner of the building with a turret and spire, but this was never built. The building was designed with two levels; the main church space and a basement. The church's main entrance has an arcaded portico with columns of Portland and Bath stone. The entrance led to a lobby with stair access to the gallery space on each side and doors to the main body of the church. The nave contained a central aisle, side aisles and a clerestory. Flanking both sides of the altar space were the minister and choir vestries. The west end of the gallery contained the organ and narrower sections spanned above the side aisles. The original pulpit and communion fittings were of stained oak and deal, while the font was made from Portland stone, with columns of polished Bardilla stone. The church's basement level was built to include four classrooms and a Sunday school room, the latter of which was also used for meetings and other events.
