= Wyke Regis =

Village in Dorset, England

Coordinates: 50.592°N 2.475°W

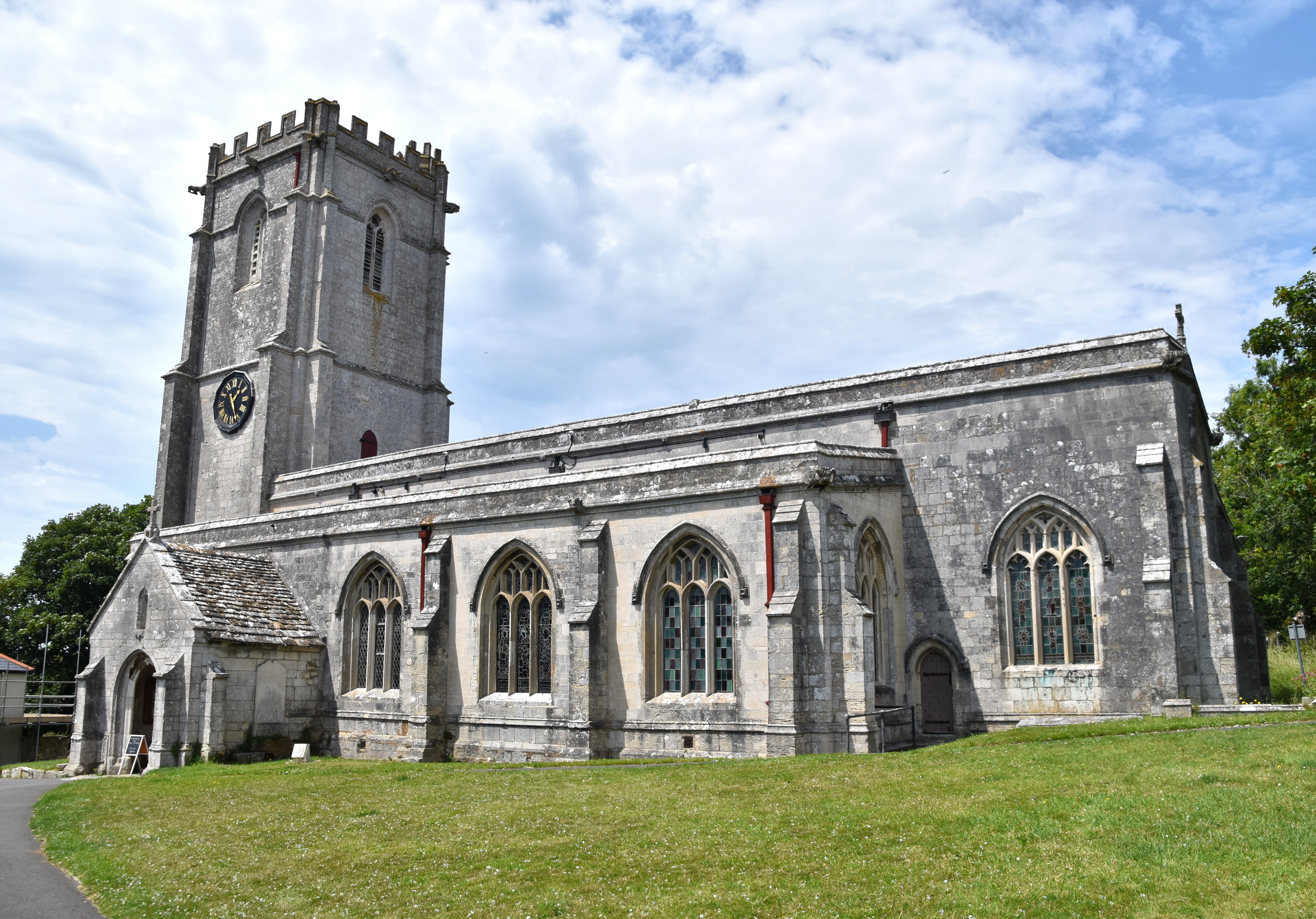
- All Saints Church, Wyke Regis

- Location within Dorset
- Population: 5,458
- OS grid reference: SY663770
- Civil parish: Weymouth
- Unitary authority: Dorset
- Ceremonial county: Dorset
- Region: South West
- Country: England
- Sovereign state: United Kingdom
- Post town: WEYMOUTH
- Postcode district: DT4 9
- Dialling code: 01305
- Police: Dorset
- Fire: Dorset and Wiltshire
- Ambulance: South Western
- UK Parliament: South Dorset

Wyke Regis /ˌwaɪk ˈriːdʒɪs/ is a village in the civil parish of Weymouth, in south Dorset, England. The village is part of the south western suburbs of Weymouth, on the northern shore of Portland Harbour and the south-eastern end of Chesil Beach. Wyke is 15 kilometres (9 mi) south of the county town, Dorchester. The village has a population of around 5,500.

== History ==
All Saints' Church in the village is known to have been frequented by King George III during his summer visits to Weymouth between 1790 and 1805. The church was the main place of worship for Weymouth citizens until the first sizeable church was built in the main part of the town in the 19th century. The victims of the wrecks of the East Indiaman ship Earl of Abergavenny, including its captain John Wordsworth, brother of poet William Wordsworth, are buried in the churchyard, as are bodies recovered from Alexander. Construction of the church started around 1451; it took four years to build and was dedicated on 19 October 1455. The church is constructed of local stone brought from quarries on Portland and at Upwey.

Thanks to treacherous local currents and the long sweep of Chesil Beach on which many ships ran aground, the village, as well as the neighbouring Isle of Portland gained a reputation for both smuggling and the looting of wrecks. This reputation is reflected today in the name of a local public house, the Wyke Smugglers previously known as the Wyke Hotel.

Located close to the Fleet Lagoon of Chesil Beach is the Wyke Regis Training Area.

In 1931 the civil parish had a population of 4378. On 1 April 1933 the parish was abolished and merged with Weymouth and Chickerell.

== Industry ==
The major industry in the area was Whitehead Torpedo Works, which has now closed. As the major employer in the village, Whitehead's funded the building of two schools, which opened in 1897. Whitehead's expertise also led to the Royal Naval establishment at Portland becoming a major anti-submarine and torpedo warfare centre in both the First and Second World Wars. The Whitehead site is now a housing estate. It later became Vickers Armstrong, Wellworthys and finally AE Piston Products.

In 2018 London based theatre company The Pensive Federation, inspired by artistic director Neil J. Byden's family and upbringing in Wyke and his parents connections to the factory, set their annual new writing festival in the fictional factory of Reseal9. Significant Other Inc. was performed at The Vault Theatre in Waterloo.

== Schools ==
Wyke Regis Infant school is situated along Portland Road, while Wyke Regis Junior school is on the High Street. There is a Nursery school within the grounds of the Infant school. All Saints Church of England Academy is a secondary school situated on the Portland Road. The school is a Church of England school.

== Politics ==
Wyke Regis is part of South Dorset constituency for elections to the House of Commons of the United Kingdom.

Wyke Regis is part of the Rodwell and Wyke ward for elections to Dorset Council.

== Climate ==
Climate data for Weymouth, Wyke Regis (1991-2020 averages)
| Month | Jan | Feb | Mar | Apr | May | Jun | Jul | Aug | Sep | Oct | Nov | Dec | Year |
|---|---|---|---|---|---|---|---|---|---|---|---|---|---|
| Record high °C (°F) | 13.6 (56.5) | 14.1 (57.4) | 20.7 (69.3) | 22.4 (72.3) | 25.3 (77.5) | 27.5 (81.5) | 28.0 (82.4) | 31.9 (89.4) | 26.7 (80.1) | 23.2 (73.8) | 17.1 (62.8) | 14.4 (57.9) | 31.9 (89.4) |
| Mean daily maximum °C (°F) | 9.0 (48.2) | 8.9 (48.0) | 10.6 (51.1) | 12.9 (55.2) | 15.7 (60.3) | 18.1 (64.6) | 20.0 (68.0) | 20.3 (68.5) | 18.7 (65.7) | 15.5 (59.9) | 12.2 (54.0) | 9.7 (49.5) | 14.3 (57.7) |
| Daily mean °C (°F) | 6.7 (44.1) | 6.5 (43.7) | 7.9 (46.2) | 9.8 (49.6) | 12.5 (54.5) | 15.1 (59.2) | 17.0 (62.6) | 17.4 (63.3) | 15.7 (60.3) | 13.0 (55.4) | 9.9 (49.8) | 7.4 (45.3) | 11.6 (52.9) |
| Mean daily minimum °C (°F) | 4.5 (40.1) | 4.1 (39.4) | 5.2 (41.4) | 6.6 (43.9) | 9.3 (48.7) | 12.0 (53.6) | 14.0 (57.2) | 14.4 (57.9) | 12.7 (54.9) | 10.4 (50.7) | 7.4 (45.3) | 5.1 (41.2) | 8.8 (47.8) |
| Record low °C (°F) | −5.6 (21.9) | −4.0 (24.8) | −2.6 (27.3) | −2.1 (28.2) | 2.6 (36.7) | 6.3 (43.3) | 9.1 (48.4) | 8.2 (46.8) | 5.0 (41.0) | −0.1 (31.8) | −3.2 (26.2) | −4.9 (23.2) | −5.6 (21.9) |
| Average precipitation mm (inches) | 84.3 (3.32) | 60.5 (2.38) | 58.1 (2.29) | 52.4 (2.06) | 44.6 (1.76) | 45.9 (1.81) | 40.7 (1.60) | 55.4 (2.18) | 54.9 (2.16) | 82.7 (3.26) | 98.7 (3.89) | 92.2 (3.63) | 770.4 (30.33) |
| Average precipitation days (≥ 1.0 mm) | 12.9 | 10.8 | 9.0 | 8.5 | 8.2 | 7.2 | 6.7 | 8.3 | 8.0 | 11.9 | 13.2 | 13.1 | 117.5 |
| Mean monthly sunshine hours | 69.1 | 95.5 | 141.5 | 202.1 | 235.4 | 234.8 | 245.6 | 225.7 | 178.1 | 127.5 | 84.6 | 64.5 | 1,904.4 |
Source 1: Met Office
Source 2: Starlings Roost Weather

== Location ==
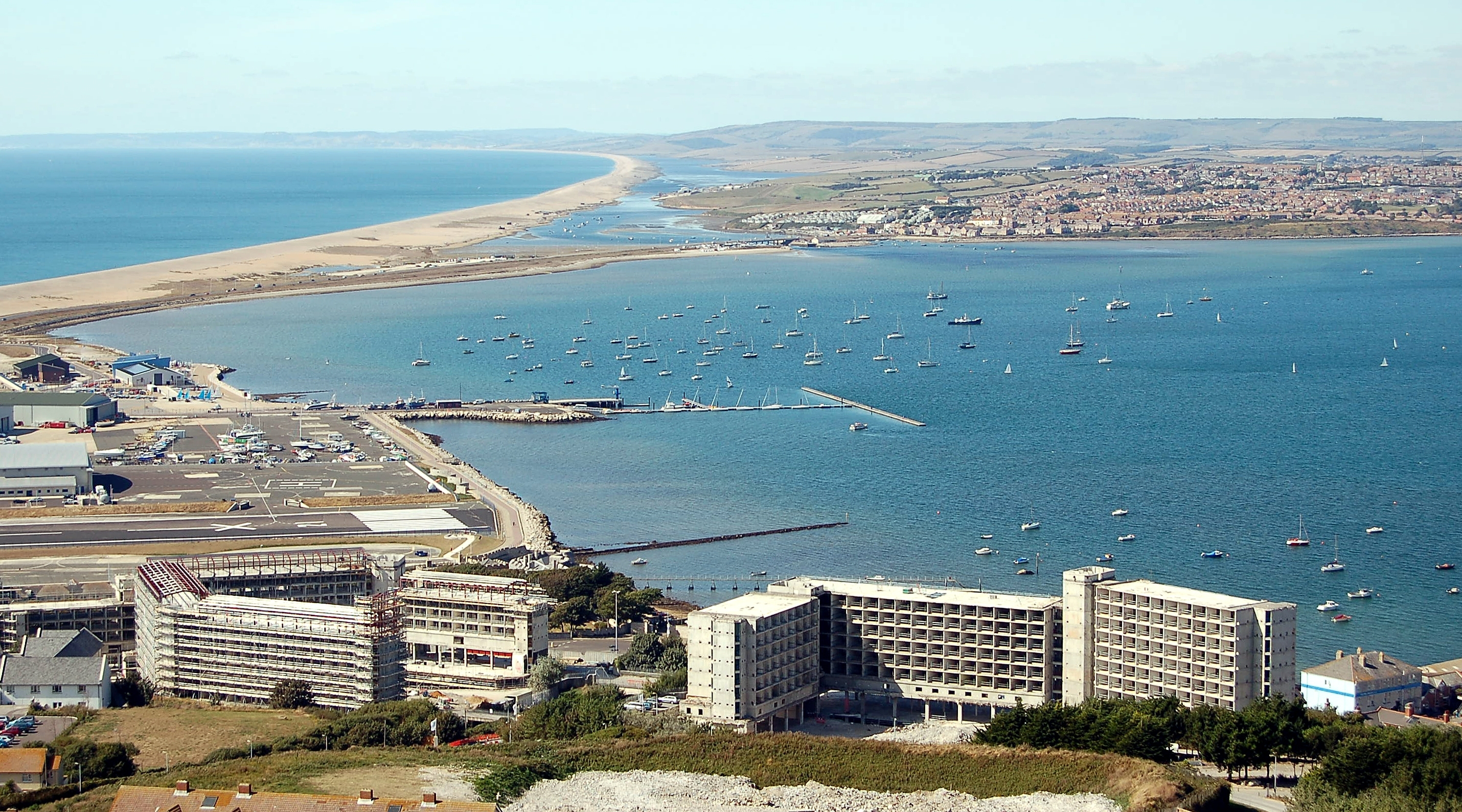
Wyke Regis and its surroundings, from the Isle of Portland

Wyke Regis looks over Chesil Beach and the Fleet lagoon to the west, the Isle of Portland to the south and Portland Harbour to the south and east. The South West Coast Path passes around the coast of the village, which is also around halfway along the Jurassic Coast World Heritage Site.

== Landmarks ==
- On Westhill Road is a folly known as Wyke Castle, dating from the nineteenth century and now divided into three dwellings.
- Wyke Regis Methodist Church was built in 1903 and forms part of the Dorset South & West Methodist Circuit.
- Wyke Regis War Memorial, erected in 1919 in remembrance of local men who lost their lives in World War I.
- In January 2019, a concrete BMX and Skate pump track was built on the Wyke Regis Playing Fields, said to be the first of its kind in the UK.

== See also ==
- Rodwell Trail
- Regis (Place)
- List of place names with royal patronage in the United Kingdom
