= Alexander (1803 ship Bombay) =

Coordinates: 50.584°N 2.470°W

History

United Kingdom
- Name: Alexander
- Owner: Charles Forbes & Co.
- Builder: Bombay
- Launched: 1803
- Fate: Wrecked 27 March 1815

General characteristics
- Tons burthen: 600, or 746 (bm)
- Propulsion: Sail
- Sail plan: Full-rigged ship
- Complement: 140 or 150

Alexander was a merchant vessel launched at Bombay in 1803. She was shipwrecked in 1815 while on passage from Bombay to London two miles (3 km) from the Isle of Portland on the Dorset coast in the English Channel. Only five of the ship's 140 (or 150) crew and passengers survived the disaster.

== Career notes ==
Alexander was one of the transport vessels supporting the British Invasion of Java (1811)

== Loss ==
The wreck occurred on March 27, 1815, when Alexander entered the Channel after a lengthy voyage, and was caught by a very strong gale from the South-Southwest that pushed the ship onto the beach in front of the village of Wyke, Dorset, during the night. None of the ship's officers survived the wreck, and the incident was not observed by any witnesses on the shoreline, so the circumstances of the disaster remain somewhat unclear.

Early in the morning of the 27th, the local population discovered a large quantity of wreckage scattered along the shore for several miles in both directions. Amongst this wreckage was found the bodies of 39 lascar seamen and seven of the ship's European officers and passengers, whilst five others were found alive, all lascars, although their nationalities and genders are disputed by sources. (Note: One source gives the origins of the five survivors as four Malays and one Persian.)

Local people clothed and fed the survivors, and collected the bodies on the beach for burial. The lascars were buried in a mass grave in the churchyard, as their names were lost with the ship's papers, but the Europeans were identified soon afterwards and buried under a memorial erected nearby that stated:

To record the melancholy wreck of

THE SHIP ALEXANDER

This monument is erected by C Forbes Esq., MP London and the owners of said ship, which, on her voyage from Bombay to London was totally lost in the West Bay, on the night of 26 March 1815, when all the crew and passengers, consisting of more than 140 souls, unhappily perished, with the exception of five lascars.

Alexander's captain was Lewis Auldjo, who was a son of George Auldjo of Aberdeen, and Susan Beauvais, of Jermyn Street, St James's, London. Lewis Auldjo had married Elizabeth Cooke, the eldest daughter of Captain John Cooke of Calcutta, and it is understood from the Monumental Inscription recorded from the South Park Street Burial Ground Monument in Calcutta, that their child was also aboard on that unhappy day. In his last Will and Testament, Captain Lewis Auldjo appointed Charles Forbes, his friend, as his sole Executor.

== See also ==
- Arniston, another East Indiaman wrecked in the same year

== Citations ==
- Grocott, Terence (1997). Shipwrecks of the Revolutionary & Napoleonic Eras. London: Chatham. ISBN 1861760302.
- Phipps, John (1840). A Collection of Papers Relative to Ship Building in India ...: Also a Register Comprehending All the Ships ... Built in India to the Present Time ... Scott.
