= Ashley Heath Halt railway station =

Disused railway station in Ashley Heath, Dorset

Ashley Heath Halt
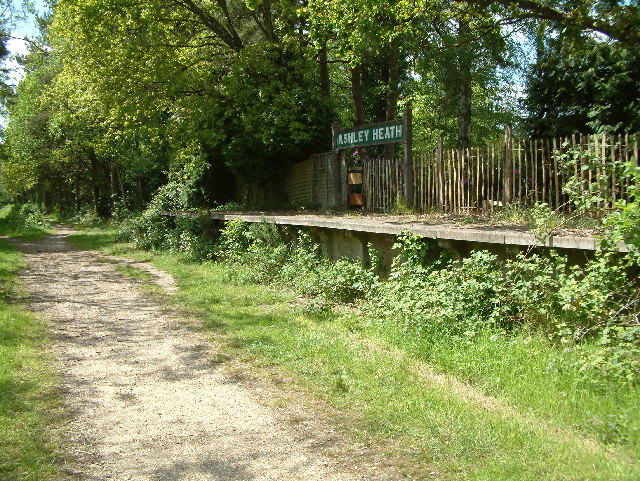
- Remains of the London-bound platform on the Castleman Trailway

General information
- Location: Ashley Heath, Dorset; England
- Coordinates: 50.8417°N 1.8409°W
- Grid reference: SU113047
- Platforms: 2

Other information
- Status: Disused

History
- Original company: Southern Railway

Key dates
- 1 April 1927: Opened
- 4 May 1964: Closed to passengers
Location

Ashley Heath Halt was a railway station in England on the Southampton and Dorchester Railway formerly in the county of Hampshire (now part of Dorset). Opened in 1927, it served the areas of St Leonards and St Ives as well as the village of Ashley Heath itself. This was an emerging residential area, the northern part of what is now the South East Dorset conurbation. The halt consisted of two concrete platforms each with a shelter. There was also a public siding for goods traffic behind the down (south) side platform. The halt was closed during the Beeching Axe, losing its passenger trains in 1964.

== History ==
The Southampton and Dorchester Railway (sponsored by the London and South Western Railway) opened the line here in 1847; it crossed Horton Road at a level crossing, named Woolsbridge Crossing after a hamlet 1 mile (1.6 km) to the west. At the time, this area was sparsely populated heathland on the fringe of Ringwood Forest and there was no need for a station.

Spurred by the nearby residential developments of St Leonards, St Ives and Ashley Heath, the Southern Railway (successor to the LSWR) opened an unstaffed two-platform halt adjacent to the crossing on 1 April 1927. The halt passed to the Southern Region of British Railways on nationalisation in 1948, and the line and station were then closed to passengers by the British Railways Board on 4 May 1964. Track lifting was completed by 1968.

== The station today ==
The site is now on the Castleman Trailway, off Horton Road, the road from the Ashley Heath interchange to Three Legged Cross. The former line crosses the road next to a shop (formerly the crossing-keeper's house). Short sections of platform including the concrete nameboards remain.

Preceding station	Disused railways	Following station
Ringwood; Line and station closed	British Rail; Southern Region; Southampton and Dorchester Railway	West Moors; Line and station closed
