= St Leonards and St Ives (ward) =

Electoral ward in Dorset, England

- ward Dorset Council
- Population: 9,528
- Major settlements: Ashley Heath, St Ives and St Leonards

Current ward
- Created: 2019
- Councillor: Margaret Goringe (Conservative)
- Councillor: Ray Bryan (Conservative)
- Number of councillors: 2

St Leonards and St Ives is an electoral ward in Dorset. Since 2019, the ward has elected 2 councillors to Dorset Council.

== Geography ==
The St Leonards and St Ives ward covers the settlements of Ashley Heath, St Ives and St Leonards.

== Councillors ==
Election	Councillors	
2019	Barry Peter Goringe (Conservative)	Ray Bryan (Conservative)
2024	Barry Peter Goringe (Conservative)	Ray Bryan (Conservative)
2026	Margaret Goringe (Conservative)	Ray Bryan (Conservative)

== Election ==
=== 2019 Dorset Council election ===
2019 Dorset Council election: St Leonards and St Ives (2 seats)
Party	Candidate	Votes	%	±%
Conservative	Barry Peter Goringe	1,406	55.6	
Conservative	Ray Bryan	1,363	53.9	
UKIP	Robin Frances Grey	604	23.9	
Liberal Democrats	Ulrike Lucas	590	23.3	
UKIP	Allan Stephen Tallett	482	19.1	
Labour	Steve Hards	286	11.3	
Majority				
Turnout		2,529	40.70	
Conservative win (new seat)				
Conservative win (new seat)				

=== 2024 Dorset Council election ===
St Leonards and St Ives
Party	Candidate	Votes	%	±%
Conservative	Ray Bryan*	1,236	62.5	+8.6
Conservative	Barry Peter Goringe*	1,160	58.6	+3.0
Liberal Democrats	Nicola Joanne Buskell	730	36.9	+13.6
Liberal Democrats	Andrew Paul Barham	626	31.6	New
Turnout		1,979	30.52	
Conservative hold		Swing		
Conservative hold		Swing		

=== 2026 by-election ===
On the 2nd of July 2026, a by-election was held following the death of Barry Goringe:

St Leonards and St Ives by-election
Party	Candidate	Votes	%	±%
Conservative	Margaret Goringe	928	37.9	−25.0
Reform	Philip Leach	823	33.6	New
Liberal Democrats	Andrew Barham	629	25.6	−11.4
Green	Mark Keith	68	2.8	New
Turnout		2452	37.45	+6.93
Conservative hold		Swing		

== See also ==
- List of electoral wards in Dorset
