= St Leonards and St Ives =

Civil parish in Dorset, England

Coordinates: 50.83197°N 1.84113°W

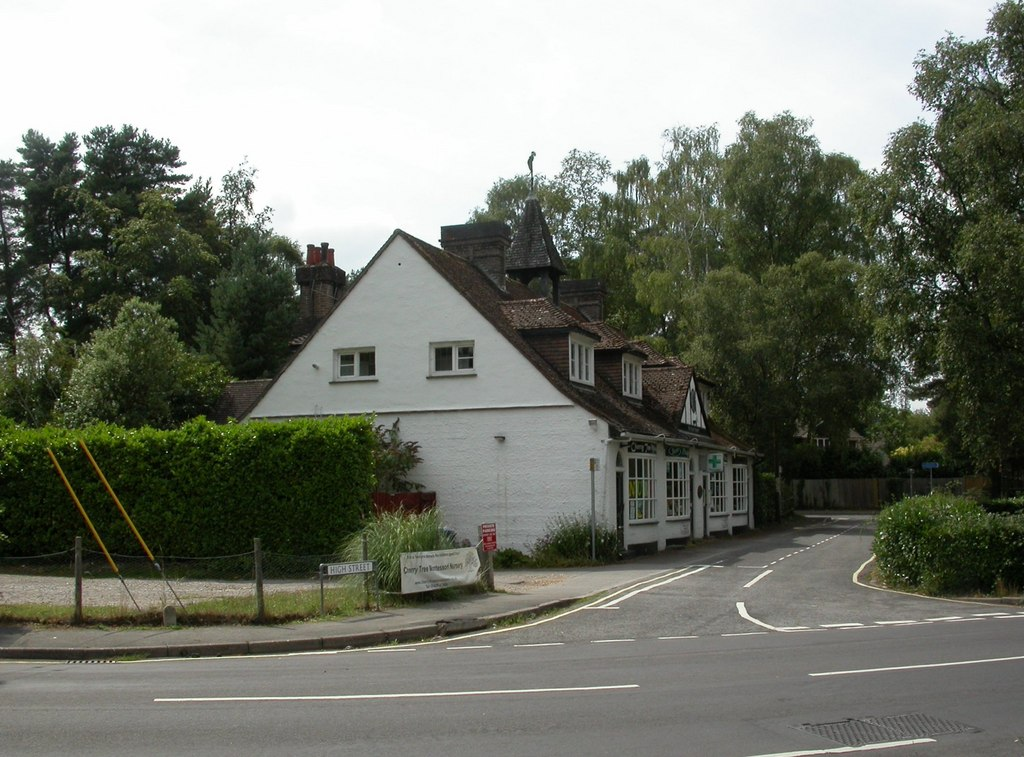
- Ashley Heath, one of the main settlements in the parish

- Location within Dorset
- Population: 7,905 (Parish, 2021)
- Civil parish: St Leonards and St Ives
- Unitary authority: Dorset
- Ceremonial county: Dorset
- Region: South West
- Country: England
- Sovereign state: United Kingdom
- Post town: Ringwood
- Postcode district: BH24
- Dialling code: 01425
- Police: Dorset
- Fire: Dorset and Wiltshire
- Ambulance: South Western
- UK Parliament: Christchurch

St Leonards and St Ives is a civil parish in Dorset, England. The parish contains the settlements of Ashley, Ashley Heath, St Ives and St Leonards, which have merged to form a single urban area.

== History ==
The parish was created on 1 April 1932, mostly from the part of the ancient parish of Ringwood which lay west of the River Avon, but also gaining a smaller part from the parish of Hurn (which had been created in 1894 from part of Christchurch).

The parish was named after two small hamlets of St Ives and St Leonards, which were both gradually being developed in an area that had been largely undeveloped heath and woodland until the early twentieth century. Much of the heath had been called Ashley Heath, and Ashley Heath Halt railway station was opened in 1927 by the Southern Railway to serve the area. The station subsequently closed in 1964.

The parish was transferred from Hampshire to Dorset in 1974 under the Local Government Act 1972.

== Geography ==
The three formerly separate settlements of Ashley Heath, St Ives and St Leonards have now coalesced into a single built-up area, which the Office for National Statistics calls Ashley Heath. The built-up area had a population at the 2021 census of 7,150, being the significant majority of the overall parish's population of 7,905.

Although administratively separate from Ringwood since 1932 and in a different county to it since 1974, the area continues to have Ringwood as its post town.

== Governance ==
There are two tiers of local government covering St Leonards and St Ives, at parish and unitary authority level: St Leonards and St Ives Parish Council and the St Leonards and St Ives ward for Dorset Council. The parish council meets at the village hall on Braeside Road in St Leonards.
