= Holes Bay Nature Park =

Protected area in Dorset, England

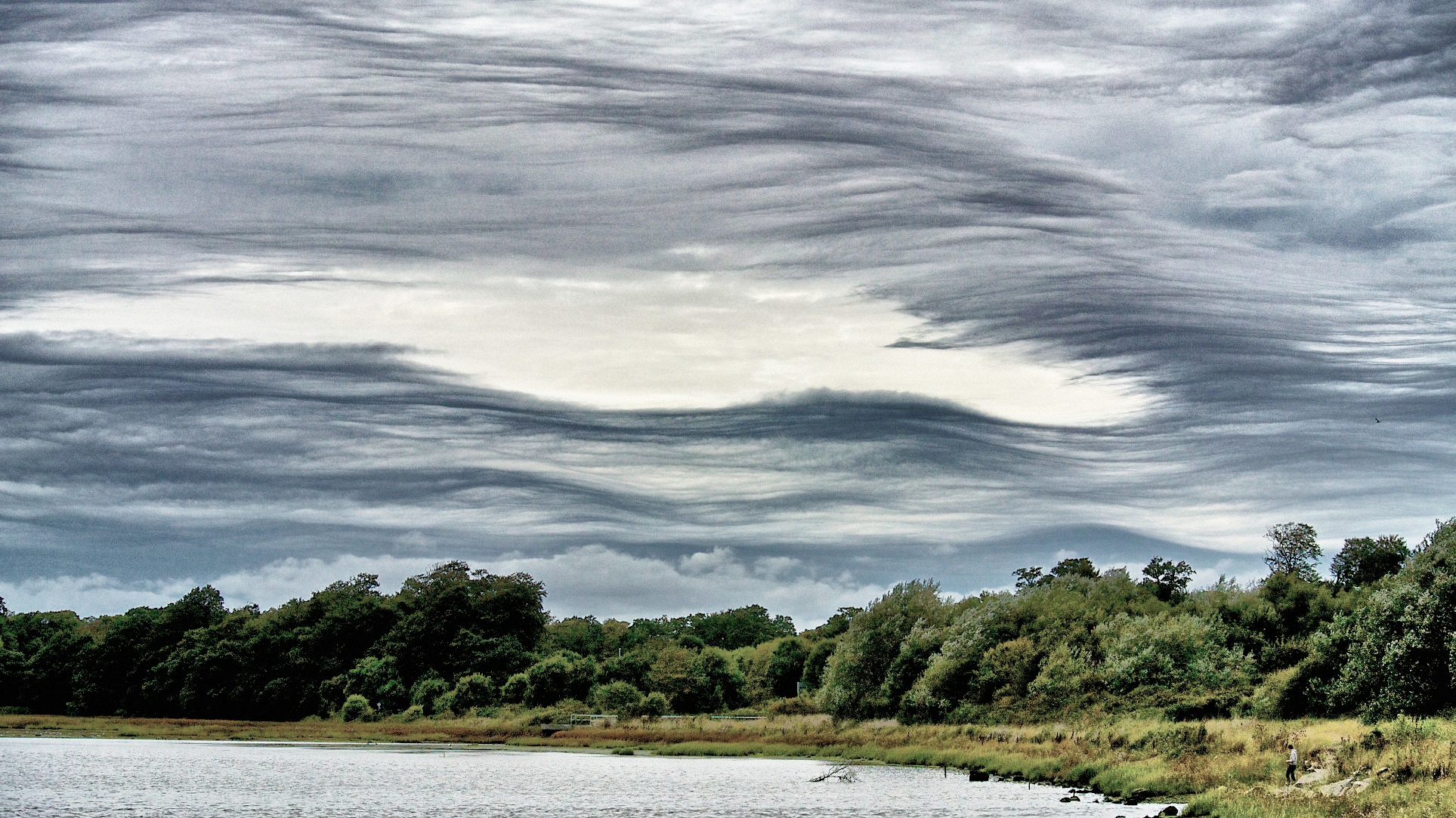
- Shoreline of Holes Bay
- Interactive map of Holes Bay Nature Park
- Nearest city: Poole
- Coordinates: 50°44′13″N 2°00′41″W
- Area: 286 ha (710 acres)
- Established: March 2015

Holes Bay Nature Park is a protected area, 286 hectares in size, on and around Holes Bay, an embayment of Poole Harbour within the Borough of Poole that is important for wildlife, especially wetland birds. It was designated a nature park in March 2015.

== Purpose ==
The nature park is intended to bring landowners, local communities and local businesses closer to nature and ensure the habitat is managed for the benefit of the great variety of wildlife found within it.

== Description ==
The nature park is "one of the best places to see the wildlife of Poole Harbour" and "a fabulous wildlife area at the commercial heart of Poole." Its salt marshes and mudflats attract a wide variety of wetland birds. The bay is divided into northern and southern areas by the South West Main Line from London to Weymouth which crosses it on an embankment. The northern area is particularly sensitive due to the number of birds that use it to feed and roost.

The nature park includes Upton Country Park, with Upton House and Pergins Island, as well as trails that run around the bay. These include the Castleman Trailway, Walk No. 6 of the Poole Harbour Trails and the Poole Heritage Cycle Route. South of the marina in the southwest corner of the bay is the Hamworthy Creeks Nature Reserve.

== Habitats ==
Salt marsh, intertidal mudflats, parkland and heathland.

== Species ==
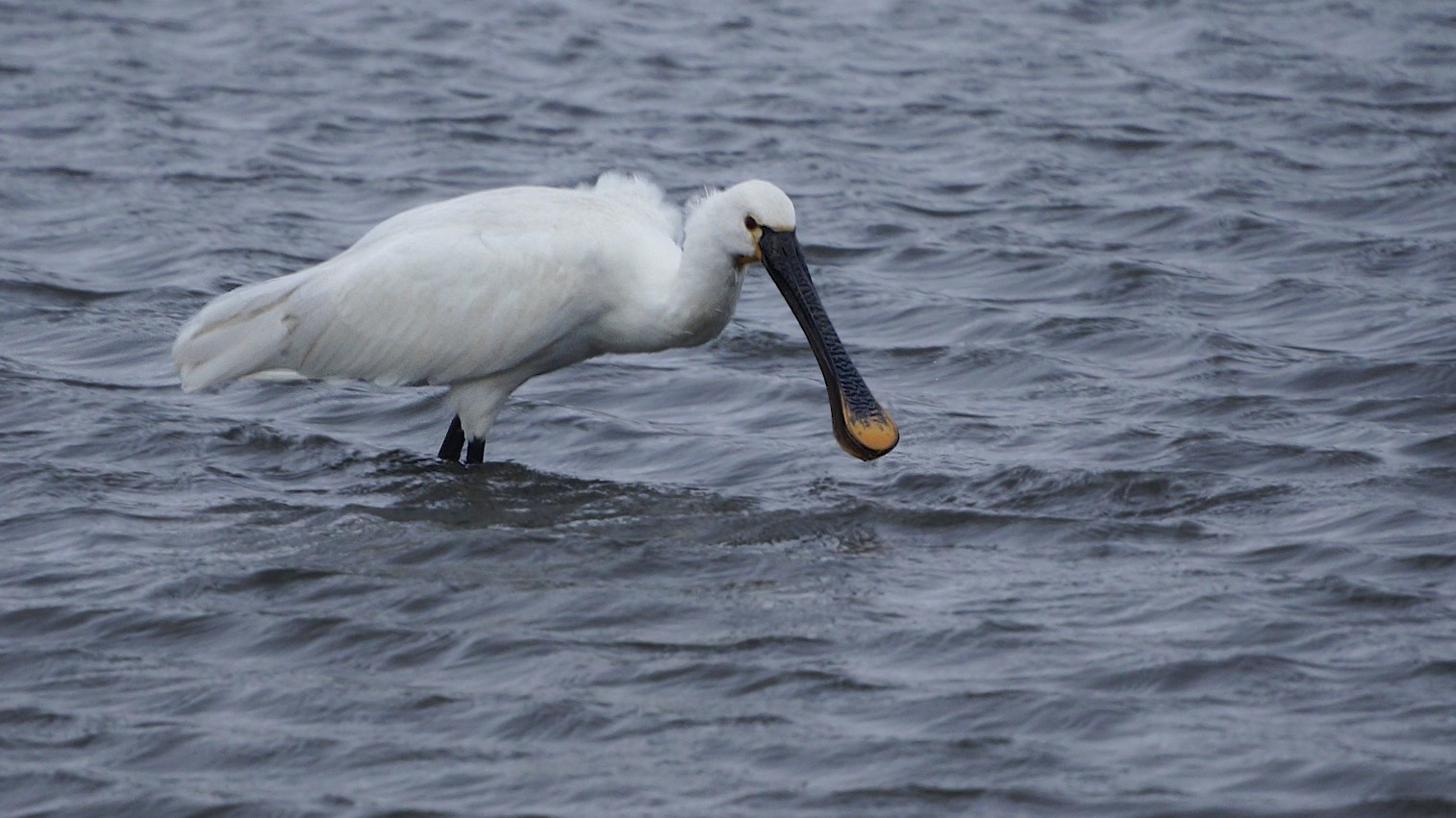
Spoonbill in Holes Bay

The nature park is home to numerous species of bird including: avocet, black-tailed godwit, curlew, kingfisher, little egret, oystercatcher, red-breasted merganser, redshank, spoonbill, teal and widgeon.

The bay is used for fishing and sealife includes: bass, mullet, flounder, corkwing wrasse, gobies, marine invertebrates such as king ragworm, clams and cockles.

Its vegetation includes woodland wild flowers, saltmarsh plants and grassland species including orchids.

== See also ==
- Corfe Barrows Nature Park
