= Corfe Barrows Nature Park =

Nature park in Dorset, England

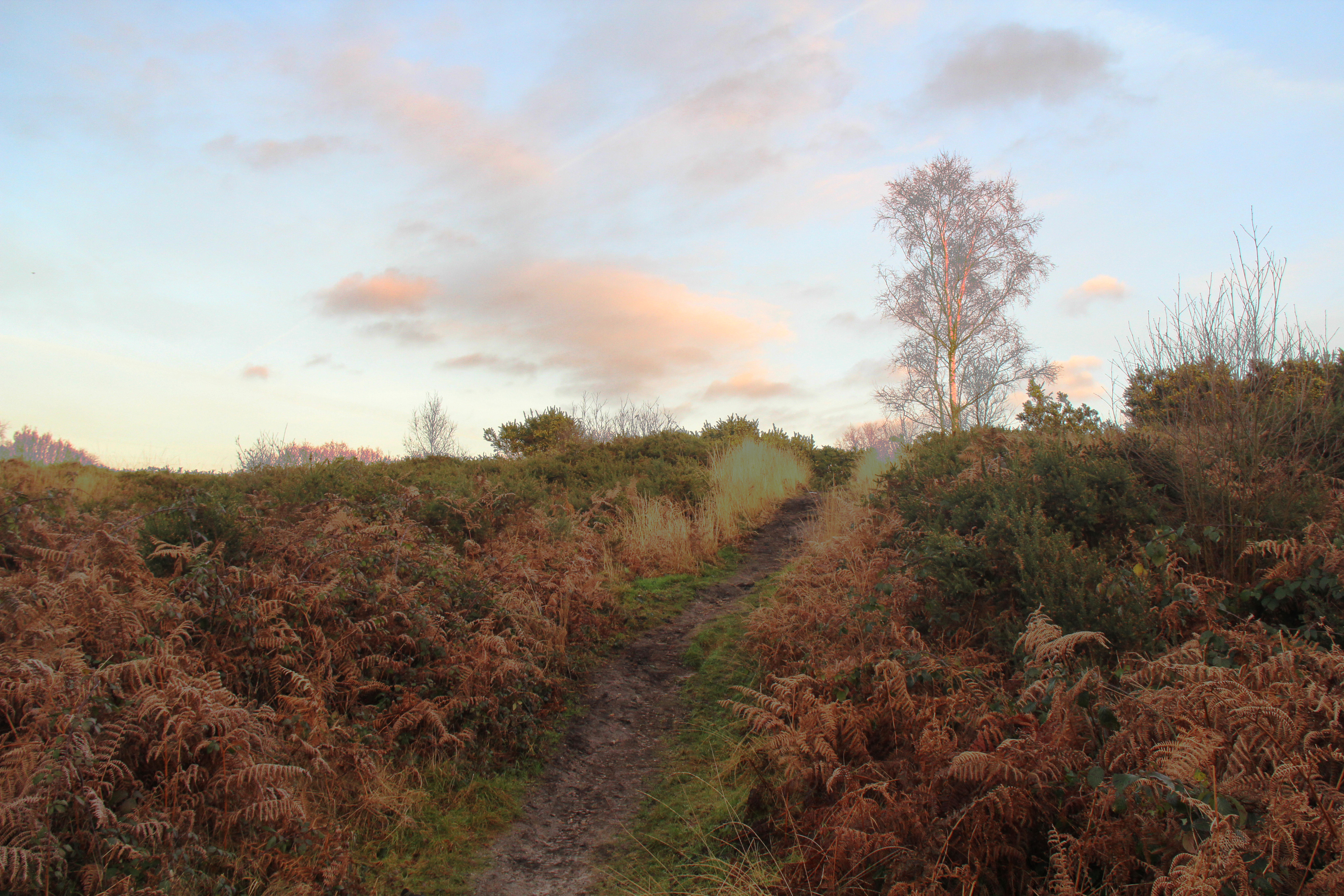
- Heathland in the centre of Corfe Hills West
- Interactive map of Corfe Barrows Nature Park
- Nearest city: Poole, Corfe Mullen
- Coordinates: 50°46′49″N 2°00′06″W
- Area: 90 ha (220 acres)
- Established: June 2016

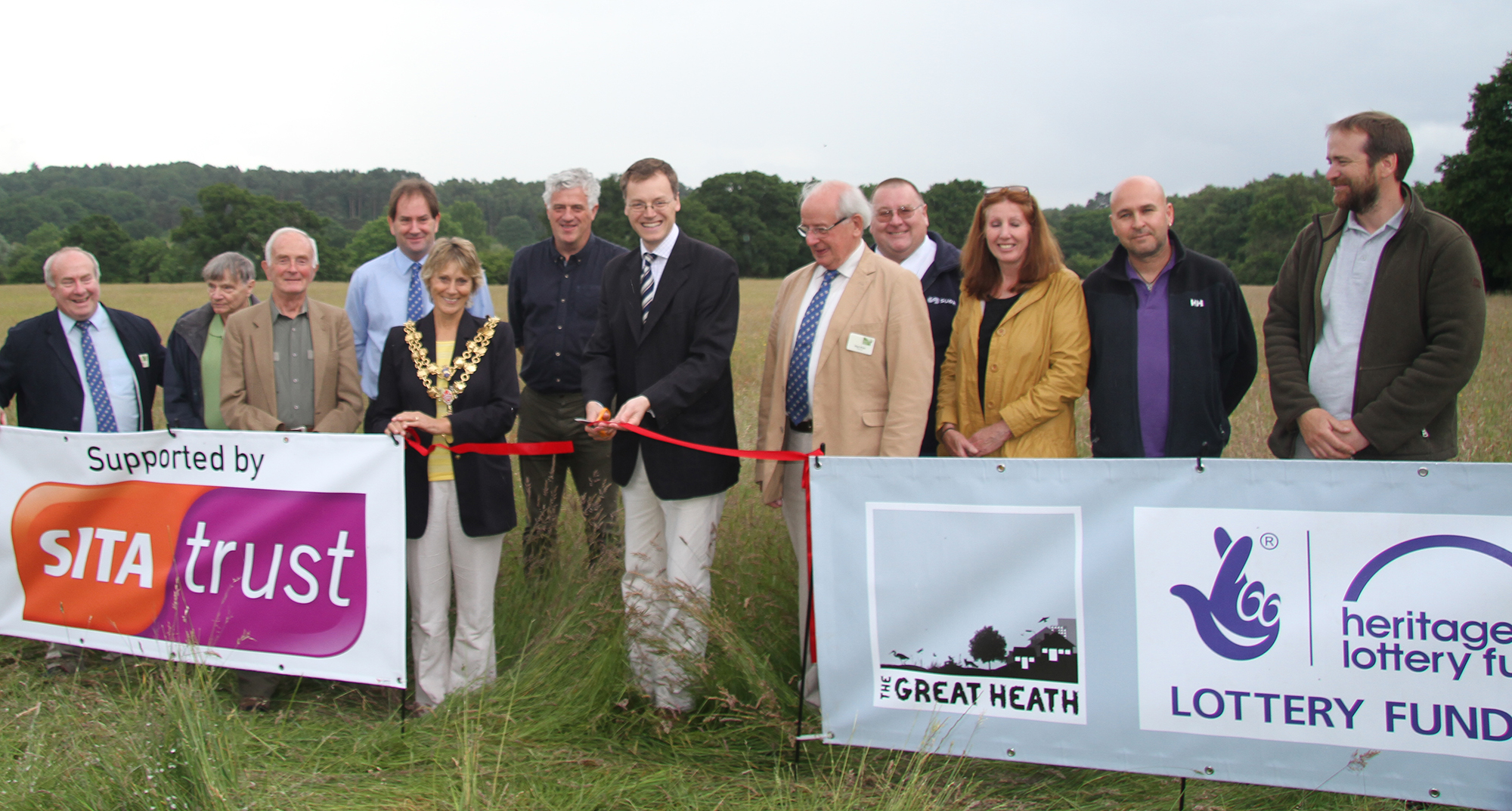
Michael Tomlinson MP opening the nature park in June 2016

Corfe Barrows Nature Park comprises around nine natural areas, covering an area of 90 hectares, within the Borough of Poole that are being managed for the benefit of wildlife and people. It was designated as a nature park in June 2016.

== Description ==
The nature park includes areas of woodland, heath, meadows and pastures that are linked by footpaths and guided trails. It is home to some of the rarest wildlife in Britain as well as Bronze Age barrows, evidence of its long history of settlement. The eight sites, which are open to the public, are:

- Happy Bottom - Nature Reserve and part SNCI
- Ashington Meadow and Cutting
- Barrow Hill
- Cogdean Elms - local nature reserve
- Rushcombe Bottom - SSSI and local nature reserve
- Diprose Dale
- Corfe Hills West - SSSI
- Corfe Hills Middle and South.

The various sites are owned by the Dorset Wildlife Trust, Erica Trust, Borough of Poole, Amphibian and Reptile Conservation, Christchurch District Council and East Dorset District Council.

== Habitats ==
Wet grassland, dry grassland, mature hedges, wet woodland and heathland.

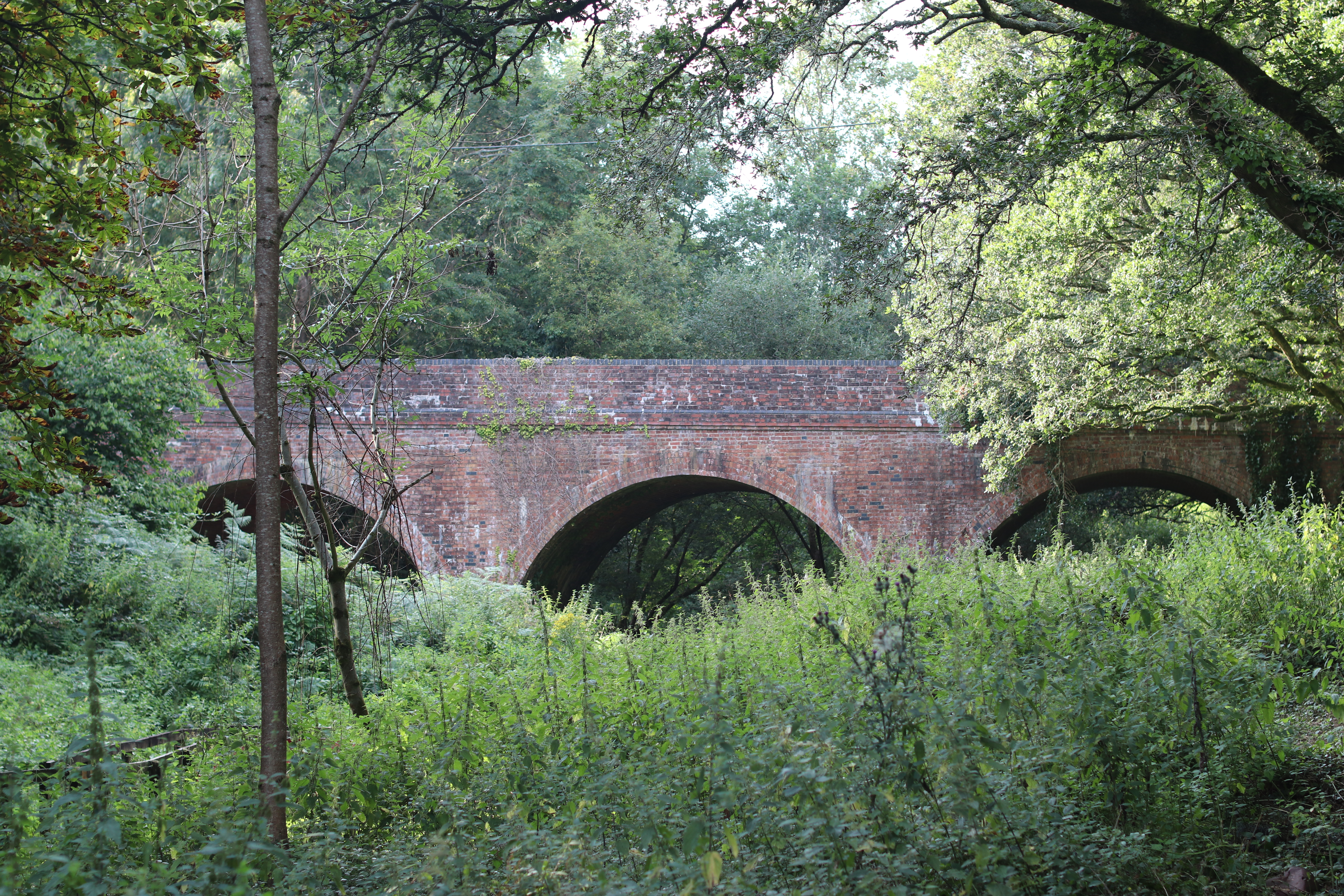
Ashington Bridge along the Ashington Cutting trail

== Species ==
The nature park is home to various species of bird including: buzzard, great spotted woodpecker, stonechat, nightjar and the rare Dartford warbler. Other animals include roe deer, sand lizard and various species of bat.

Wild flowers include: ragged robin, knapweed, ox-eye daisy, bird's foot trefoil and various heathers.

== Walking and cycling ==
There are small parking areas on Merley Park Road, Ashington but the area is best approached on foot by bus or by bicycle.

The terrain is rated as moderately difficult and there is a variety of public rights of way, permissive paths and board walks, most of which are waymarked. Information boards have also been set up at the entry points to the sites. There are cycleways along the Roman Road bridleway and Castleman Trail and the Stour Valley Way passes about 500 metres away to the north of the Happy Bottom Nature Reserve.

== See also ==
- Holes Bay Nature Park
