= St Ives, Dorset =

Village in Dorset, England

Coordinates: 50.835°N 1.825°W

St Ives
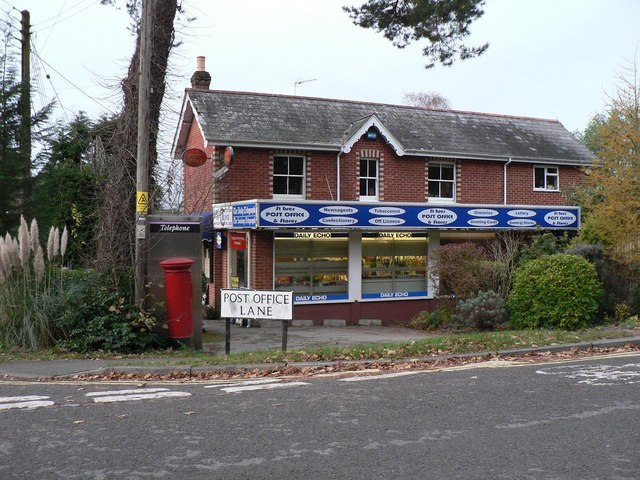
- St Ives, post office

- Location within Dorset
- OS grid reference: SU123040
- Civil parish: St Leonards and St Ives
- Unitary authority: Dorset
- Ceremonial county: Dorset
- Region: South West
- Country: England
- Sovereign state: United Kingdom
- Post town: RINGWOOD
- Postcode district: BH24
- Dialling code: 01425
- Police: Dorset
- Fire: Dorset and Wiltshire
- Ambulance: South Western
- UK Parliament: Christchurch

St Ives /sənt ˈaɪvz/ is a village in the county of Dorset in the south of England. It lies close to the border between Dorset and Hampshire, near Ringwood, Verwood and Ferndown. The village is adjacent to St Leonards and Ashley Heath. The parish of St Leonards and St Ives has a population of 6,672 (2001); 41.6% are retired. The joint population including two electoral wards (east & west) had risen to 6,859 at the 2011 Census.

The village has a shop and post office, a doctor's surgery, an ex-services club and two public houses. A youth club is situated in Braeside Park, St Leonards, next to the scout hut and the village hall.

St Ives First School has 128 students between the ages of 4–9 years old. In 2008 Ofsted described the school as "outstanding". The school contains a swimming pool which is open to the public during the summer months, and holds several community events such as the strawberry fair and Easter fair.

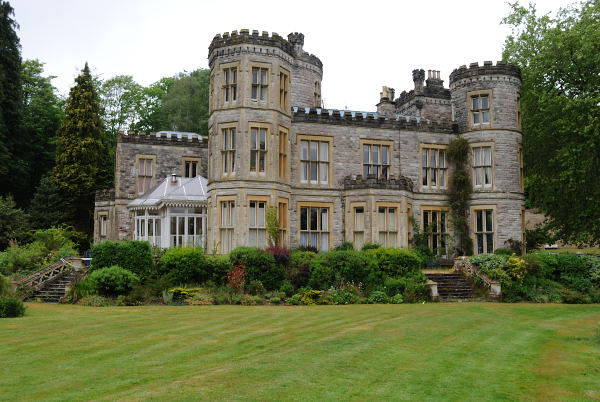
Avon Castle

To the north is Moors Valley Country Park which has many attractions such as train rides, cycle tracks, a fishing lake and a café. To the south is Avon Heath Country Park which has a large visitor centre, play park and picnic area. To the east of the park, by the river Avon, is Avon Castle, a country house built about 1872 and now divided into apartments.
