= Dorset Wildlife Trust =

Wildlife and natural habitat charity

Dorset Wildlife Trust (DWT) is a wildlife trust covering the county of Dorset, United Kingdom. The trust was founded in 1961 as Dorset Naturalists' Trust, to protect and conserve the wildlife and natural habitats of the county.

DWT is one of 46 local independent Wildlife Trusts that make up The Wildlife Trusts. DWT is headquartered at Brooklands Farm, just north of Dorchester. DWT is led by a Council of Trustees, has 27,000 members, 65 staff and over 850 active volunteers. The current chair of DWT is Mark Kibblewhite. Mark is one of Europe's leading soil scientists and an Emeritus Professor at Cranfield University. Former Chair Jo Davies, a trustee of over 20 years serves as vice-chair alongside Jim White, leading Dorset naturalist and former team leader for Natural England in Dorset. Notable former chairs include Prof. Nigel Webb, one of the UK's leading experts on heathlands and author of Collins New Naturalist No. 72 Heathlands, and Tony Bates, who was awarded an MBE in the Queen's Birthday Honours 2015 for his outstanding contribution to nature conservation in Dorset. The Chief Executive of Dorset Wildlife Trust is Brian Bleese who was appointed on 1 April 2020 after a short period as acting CE. Bleese has been with Dorset Wildlife Trust since 1998 and has held various roles with the Trust most recently that of Director of Operations and Development.

Best known for its suite of high quality nature reserves, the conservation, education, and community partnership work of the Dorset Wildlife Trust extends well beyond the designated nature reserves. DWT also runs a series of special projects led by conservation staff working with groups of volunteer members and supporter groups throughout the county. They are involved in monitoring and improving habitats for wildlife not only in the open countryside, rivers and coastal waters but also in urban and suburban environments, churchyards, and roadside verges.

A core aim of the trust, in conjunction with wildlife trusts throughout Britain, is to establish and promote living landscapes and living seas, wildlife corridors, nectar-rich links, etc. Living Landscapes are large areas in which both people and wildlife can prosper.

DWT has also taken a lead role in drawing together partnerships to establish Nature Parks, large areas managed for the benefit of people and wildlife. One such example of this is Holes Bay Nature Park on the edge of Poole. Holes Bay Nature Park is a partnership involving DWT, Borough of Poole and Poole Harbour Commissioners.

== History ==
=== Origins ===
In the 1950s and 1960s considerable heathland, downland and other habitats were lost, nationally and in Dorset. The county's heaths in the mid-eighteenth century extended to over 40,000 hectares, and had been reduced to about 10,000 hectares by 1960. The losses of chalk downland were even more drastic with vast areas converted to arable farming and cereal growing.

These losses led to increasing concerns that natural habitats of scientifically interesting plants and animals were fast disappearing. It was in response to this rising tide of habitat loss that the Dorset Naturalists' Trust was formed. The inaugural meeting of the new trust was held on Tuesday 28 March 1961 and chaired by leading Dorset naturalist and historian Prof. Ronald Good. The Trust's key founder and supporter from its beginnings in 1961 was Helen Brotherton, who would serve Dorset Wildlife Trust for the rest of her life as Honorary Secretary, Chairman and President.

=== Dorset Wildlife Trust and Brownsea Island ===
Mary Bonham-Christie owned Brownsea Island in Poole Harbour, Dorset, and being a recluse she had forbidden access to the Island for many years. In effect, the island had been abandoned to nature. In April 1961, Bonham-Christie died. This was the trigger that set in motion moves to "rescue" Brownsea Island, and preserve it "for the Nation" as a wildlife reserve. At the same time the Dorset Wildlife Trust was being formed with an inaugural meeting in March 1961. The island was handed over to HM Treasury in lieu of death duties, and HM Treasury then came to dispose of this asset. The Dorset Wildlife Trust (then The Dorset Naturalists Trust) was in no position to pay the £100,000 asking price. However, led by Helen Brotherton, an arrangement was made between the National Trust, the Dorset Wildlife Trust, the Boy Scouts Association and the John Lewis Partnership whereby each would provide £25,000 to the National Trust, who would then buy the island, with the other three parties as "partners", each taking care of their own interests. This partnership has stood the test of time.

== Nature reserves and visitor facilities ==
The trust runs 45 nature reserves totalling over 12 square kilometres, which include 25 Sites of Special Scientific Interest. Most of the reserves are owned by the trust, but some are also leased under agreements with landowners. The reserves represent 1,300 hectares of prime habitat managed for the benefit of wildlife and supporting local and regional biodiversity. The trust's diverse collection of reserves reflect the natural diversity of the geologically and habitat rich southern English county of Dorset. The wide variety of landscapes includes chalk grasslands, ancient meadows, prime woodland, internationally important rare heathland, valuable wetlands, and a section of the World Heritage listed Jurassic Coast. According to the trust, more than 200,000 people visit their reserves each year.

The trust also has seven wildlife education and outreach centres in the county:-

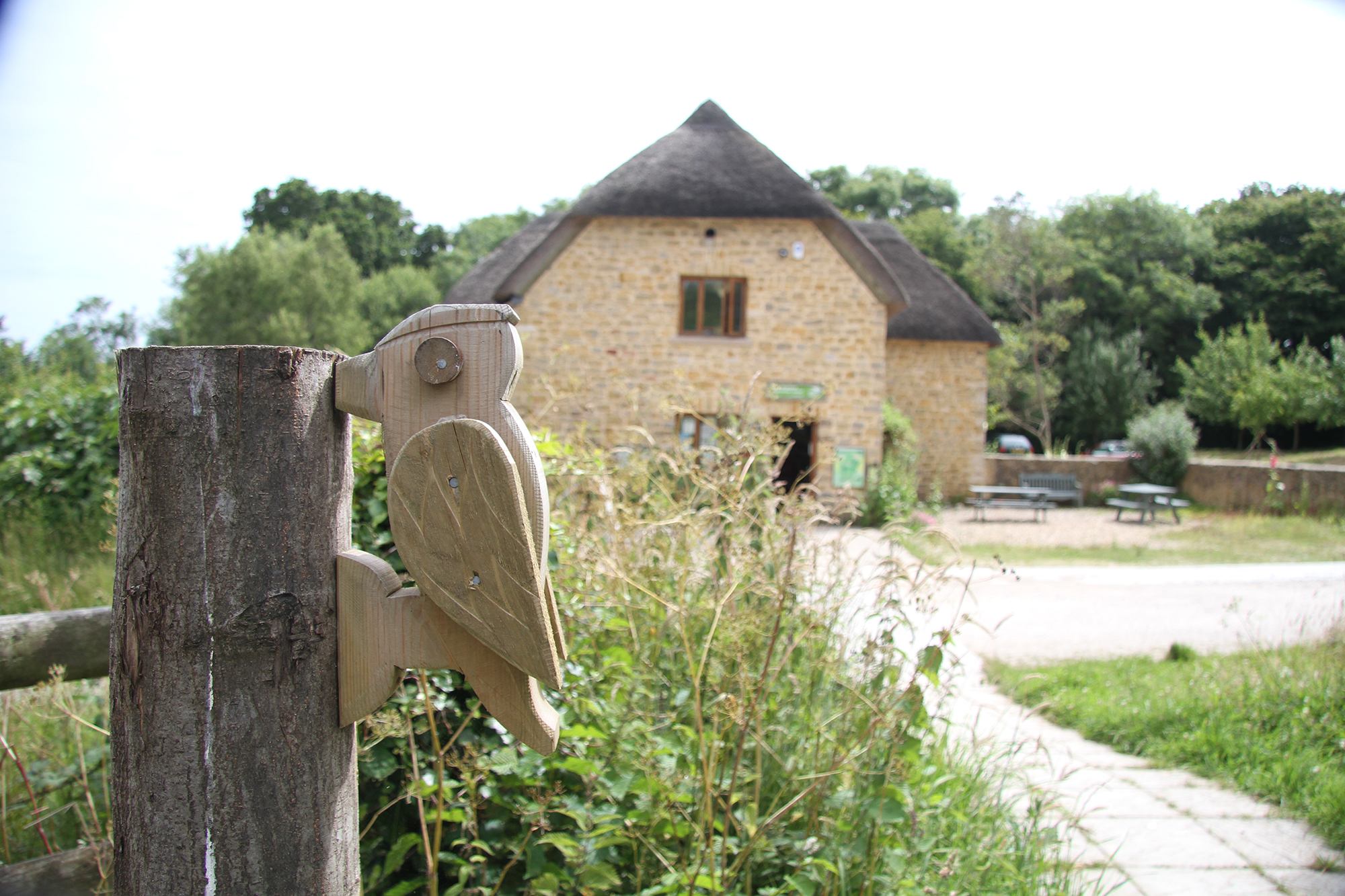
Lorton Meadows Conservation Centre, Weymouth

- Fine Foundation Wild Seas Centre, Kimmeridge,
- The Kingcombe Centre, Lower Kingcombe, Toller Porcorum
- Lorton Meadows Wildlife Centre, Weymouth,
- The Villa Wildlife Centre, Brownsea Island
- Urban Wildlife Centre, Corfe Mullen, Poole
- Fine Foundation Wild Chesil Centre, Portland and
- Brooklands Farm itself, DWT's HQ.

== Rewilding ==
In 2021 the trust acquired 170 hectares of the land of Court Farm, near Bere Regis, Dorset, for £3.8 million, utilising a grant of £3.12m from Dorset Council and Bournemouth, Christchurch and Poole Council with Dorset Wildlife Trust providing the balance of the required funding. The grant from the councils was to mitigate the flow of nitrates into the Poole Harbour catchment and a condition of the grant was the removal of the land from intensive, environmentally damaging agriculture. Utilising natural regeneration methods the trust started the process of rewilding the land. The initiative has received significant support from local community volunteers and Bere Regis Parish Council.

The Trust was supported in the purchase by philanthropist Julia Davies of 'We have the Power'. Following consultation with Dorset Wildlife Trust members and the local community the site was renamed 'Wild Woodbury' to reflect the area's history and future aspirations.

== The Great Heath ==
In 2013 DWT led the development of the Great Heath Living Landscape project, a partnership involving Borough of Poole, The Erica Trust, Amphibian and Reptile Conservation (ARC), Poole Harbour Commissioners and Dorset County Council. The project was initiated to enable the purchase of almost 1500 acres of heathland and other habitats from Canford Estate. During its development phase the project expanded to include a three-year access and engagement programme and a suite of sites owned and managed by partners. The project was funded by a grant of £2.7m from the Heritage Lottery Fund and a further £2.1m from partners, other funding bodies and through community fundraising.

== Nature parks ==
A key initiative of Dorset Wildlife Trust is the establishment of Nature Parks. DWT describes Nature Parks as a partnership of landowners and stakeholders that have come together to manage an area for its special features and its value to both people and wildlife.

The first Nature Park to be launched was Holes Bay Nature Park located in Poole Harbour is a partnership of DWT, Poole Harbour Commissioners and Borough of Poole together with a range of stakeholders including local businesses and community groups. Holes Bay Nature Park was launched in 2015.

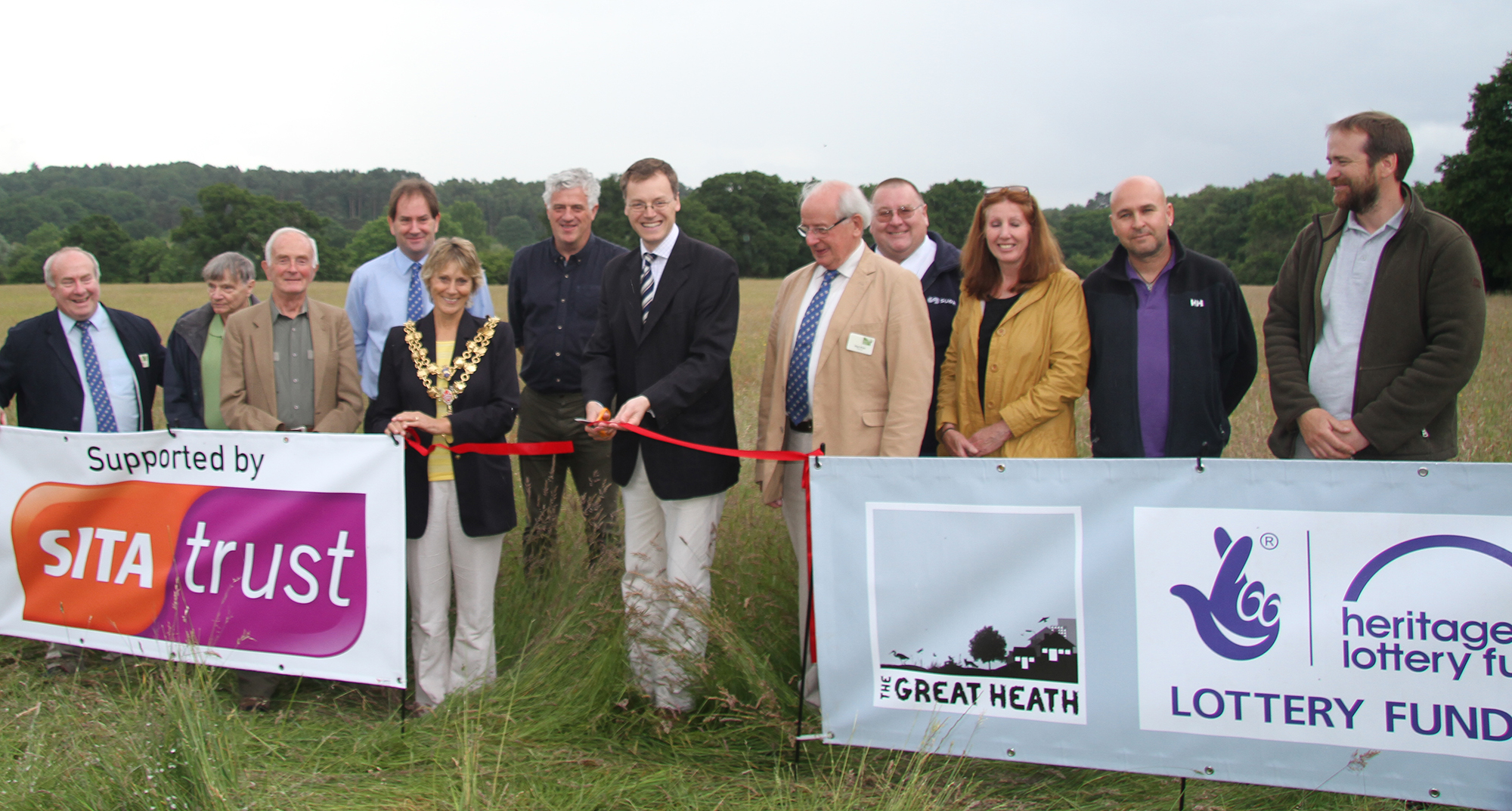
Michael Tomlinson MP opens Corfe Barrows Nature Park attended by Mayor of Poole Xena Dion and project partners.

Corfe Barrows Nature Park, which opened in June 2016 is a partnership of landowners including Dorset Wildlife Trust, Borough of Poole, Christchurch and East Dorset Councils, Amphibian and Reptile Conservation and the Erica Trust. Access improvements, signage and information panels were funded by the Heritage Lottery Fund and SITA Trust (Landfill Communities Fund).
