= Tucktonia =

Defunct amusement park in Dorset, England

- Interactive map of Tucktonia
- Location: Christchurch, Dorset, England
- Coordinates: 50.732°N 1.790°W
- Opened: 23 May 1976
- Closed: 1986
- Area: 4 acres (1.6 ha)

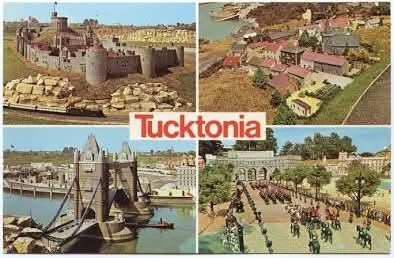
Tourist Holiday Postcard

Tucktonia was a late 1970s theme park located on Stour Road, Christchurch, Dorset, England. It was officially opened on 23 May 1976 by Arthur Askey. It originally occupied 4 acres (1.6 ha) of the 21-acre (8.5 ha) Tuckton Park Leisure Complex. The park was closed down in 1986. The site has since been redeveloped for residential use.

== General information ==
The park was best known for its large model village layout, which included a representation of London.

The 7.25-inch (184 mm) narrow gauge ride-on steam train and some additional fixtures and fittings, were moved to the Moors Valley Railway in the Moors Valley Country Park near Ringwood, Hampshire.

It is rumoured that just prior to the closure of the park, the owners wanted to build a roller coaster at the rear of the site, but were refused permission by the local council. Following the refusal, the park closed shortly afterwards.

Bekonscot Model Village in Buckinghamshire provided much inspiration for the designers, one of whom had his office near Bekonscot and was a frequent visitor. The bulk of the models were built by KLF Ltd, who later went on to design similar models at Britannia Park in Derbyshire (known as "The American Adventure" theme park by the time of its demise in 2006). Tucktonia was the brainchild of former double British Formula 3 champion Harry Stiller who was still living in the area in 2006, before his death in 2018.

Some sources claim that the miniature London landmarks were destroyed during the making of the 1985 alien invasion movie Lifeforce, and that the entire model village was destroyed when the park closed. However, other sources claim that, while the model village was used as the miniature set for the filming of Lifeforce, the visual effects crew actually used their own destructible miniatures in the Tucktonia streets. The model of Buckingham Palace survives; this was acquired, restored and put on display at the Wimborne Model Town, Wimborne Minster in 2002, and moved to Merrivale Model Village, Great Yarmouth in 2006.

There are numerous unsubstantiated rumours that the models were not destroyed after the closure of the park – the main one being that they were instead placed into storage within a barn where they remained until 2001, when the building burned down.

BBC Television's Multi-Coloured Swap Shop show broadcast live from the park on one occasion.

The park's model London was used extensively in the obscure 1976 King Kong spoof Queen Kong.

== Places and buildings featured in the model village ==
- Christchurch Priory
- Prospect of Whitby (London pub)
- High Street, Great Britain – a re-creation of a "typical" British High Street
- London's Tower Bridge, The Victoria Embankment, The Houses of Parliament, Westminster Bridge, Cleopatra's Needle, HMS "Discovery", The National Westminster Tower, Piccadilly Circus

== Rides and attractions present whilst the park was operating ==
- Various small-scale fairground rides
- A range of standard kiddie rides, including 20p-a-go mini bumper three-wheeled motorcycles
- Magic castle-themed giant six-lane Fun Slide (May 1986)
- Boating lake with motorised bumper boats
- Amusement Arcade
- Ride on small-scale Land Rover cars
- Crazy Golf/nine-hole golf course
- 7 1/4-inch miniature narrow gauge scale ride on Steam Train – Later moved/sold to Moors Valley Railway (1980–1985)
- Model village
- 2 1/2-inch gauge electric model railway, featuring half a mile of track, and 75 items of rolling stock
- Cafeteria
- Golfers Arms restaurant
- Roy of the Rovers bar for children
- Go-kart track
- Mini-Cinema, showing cartoons
- Souvenir shops

== After closure ==
After the park closed in 1986, the buildings and fixtures were cleared and the land used at first for a public house called "The Old Colonial", then, at a later date, "Bar Max". These were housed in the original buildings built by Harry Stiller and operated by him and known as the Golfer's Arms. This was a highly popular venue for both locals and tourists alike and featured the Raceway bar, where one of Harry Stiller's original race cars was a centrepiece on one of the walls in the main bar.

Bar Max eventually closed and the buildings demolished in 2003 to make way for a number of retirement flats and private dwellings.
