= Oakley, Dorset =

Village in Dorset, England

Coordinates: 50.78°N 01.98°W

Oakley
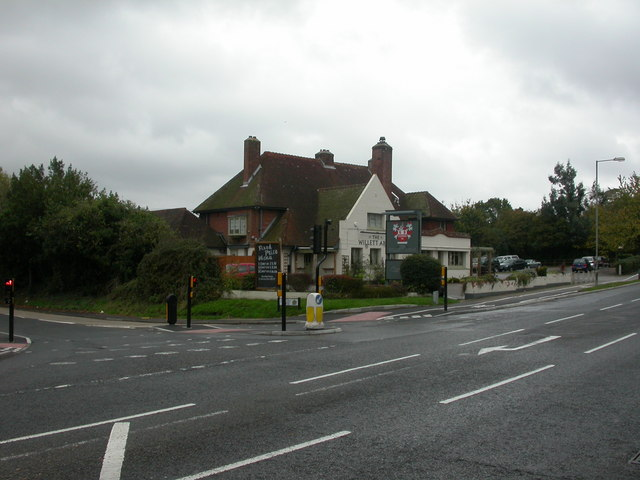
- The Willett Arms at Oakley

- Location within Dorset
- Population: 2,400
- OS grid reference: SZ0198
- Unitary authority: Bournemouth, Christchurch and Poole
- Ceremonial county: Dorset
- Region: South West
- Country: England
- Sovereign state: United Kingdom
- Post town: Wimborne
- Postcode district: BH21
- Dialling code: 01202
- Police: Dorset
- Fire: Dorset and Wiltshire
- Ambulance: South Western
- UK Parliament: Mid Dorset and North Poole

Oakley is a village community in Dorset, England. Sitting just south of the River Stour it borders the suburb of Merley and the village of Canford Magna to the East and South and the Town of Wimborne 2 km to the North. The B3073, which links Wimborne and Poole, runs through the community.

Oakley has four major roads; Oakley Hill, Oakley Lane, Oakley Road and Merley Ways and approximately 800 individual dwellings. Smaller roads include Ullswater Road, Silverwood Close and Harrier Drive.

== Buildings and architecture ==
A conservation area covers Oakley and its attractive Lady Wimborne Cottages. Oakley Hill, Oakley Lane and Cruxton Farm are all listed as containing Buildings of Local Importance by the Borough of Poole. The Cottages date back to the late 19th Century when they were built by Lord Wimborne to house specialist workers from his Estate. The cottages were beautifully designed and so were given the title 'Lady Wimborne' cottages. Nowadays many of them have been extended, though keeping to the original style and building materials. The project was started by his mother, Charlotte Guest, and continued by his wife Cornelia Guest.

Most of the houses in Merley Ways and Oakley Hill were added in the 1930s and 1940s. They range from large, detached, villa-style houses, to more modest bungalow residences for the more elderly residents. The houses at the bottom of Merley Ways have access to the River Stour and many families own rowing boats and canoes. Most houses have large gardens, private garages and some have swimming pools.

Silverwood Close, Cruxton Farm and Harrier Drive are the newest roads in the community. The houses are large, detached and modern with those at the bottom of Silverwood Close looking out onto farming fields and the River Stour at the bottom of the hill.

=== The Willett Arms pub ===
The largest landmark in Oakley, The Willett Arms is situated on the top of Oakley Hill. Originally a private Public House, the Willett as it is referred to by locals, served travellers on the Wimborne to Poole road, as well as the Southampton and Dorchester Railway. Once the Railway line was closed the pub became less popular until the community in Merley was built and Oakley and Canford Magna began to grow. The railway line was converted into the Castleman Trailway and the Pub now serves the community, tourists, cyclists and walkers.

=== The Merley Community Centre ===
The centre serves the residents of Oakley, Merley and Canford Magna. Built in the 1960s It has two main halls and a large community lounge. The small hall is home to the Footlight Dance Academy, and the Oakley Art Club. The Val Jones Memorial Hall is home to the Merley Karate Academy, part of the Dorset Goju Ryu Karate Association and led by Sensei Penny Hughes. The community lounge is home to the Merley Social Club and tends to serve the residents of Merley. Many Oakley residents are members of Canford Magna Golf Club instead.

=== The old Post Office ===
There used to be a post office/newsagents and a small supermarket at the cross roads between Merley Lane and the A341. These closed down in the late 1970s after the shopping centre on the new Merley housing estate was opened. The old supermarket was a restaurant for many years, but is now a solicitors office.

=== Merley House ===
Merley House is an ancient manor house which belonged to Canford estate and housed Merley Bird Gardens, a collection of exotic birds in a picturesque walled garden, on its estate. It is now a holiday caravan park.

=== Oakley House ===
A small, mental health hospital for older people, Oakley House sits surrounded by fields used by a local dairy herd. The hospital was constructed in the 1850s and is staffed by the Wimborne & Purbeck Mental Health Team. It also provides support for carers. The hospital has a large garden of its own and a small wood in the grounds.

== Demographics and education ==
The community is home to mainly middle- and upper-middle-class families with a proportion of the adults being employed by Cobham plc in the field of Defence, Avionics and Surveillance Systems, and in occupations such as teaching. Many of the other adults work in Bournemouth and Poole, with some commuting to London.

The Independent Canford School is situated nearby and serves the community alongside Poole Grammar School for boys, Parkstone Grammar School for girls and the mixed Corfe Hills School.

Merley First School sits on the border between Merley and Oakley and many of the community's children are in attendance.

== Relationship with Merley ==
Merley, a large suburb and housing estate was built alongside Oakley and Canford Magna in the 1970s. Originally the developers wanted to call it Oakley Garden Village but this met with protests from the residents of Oakley, and the name Merley was chosen.

There is no defined border between Oakley, Merley and Canford Magna and only the last is signposted. Furthering the confusion, the Oakley Shopping Centre is in Merley, whilst the Merley Community Centre is technically in Oakley.

A simple way of dividing the communities is to take the bottom of Oakley Straight, pronouncing everything south and east of Harrier Drive, Merley, and everything north and west, Oakley. The residents of Oakley frequently use the amenities in Merley, which include a butcher's shop, a post office, a doctor's surgery, a pharmacy, a Chinese takeaway and a convenience store.
