= Upton House, Dorset =

Grade II* listed building in Dorset, England

Coordinates: 50°44′12″N 2°00′40″W

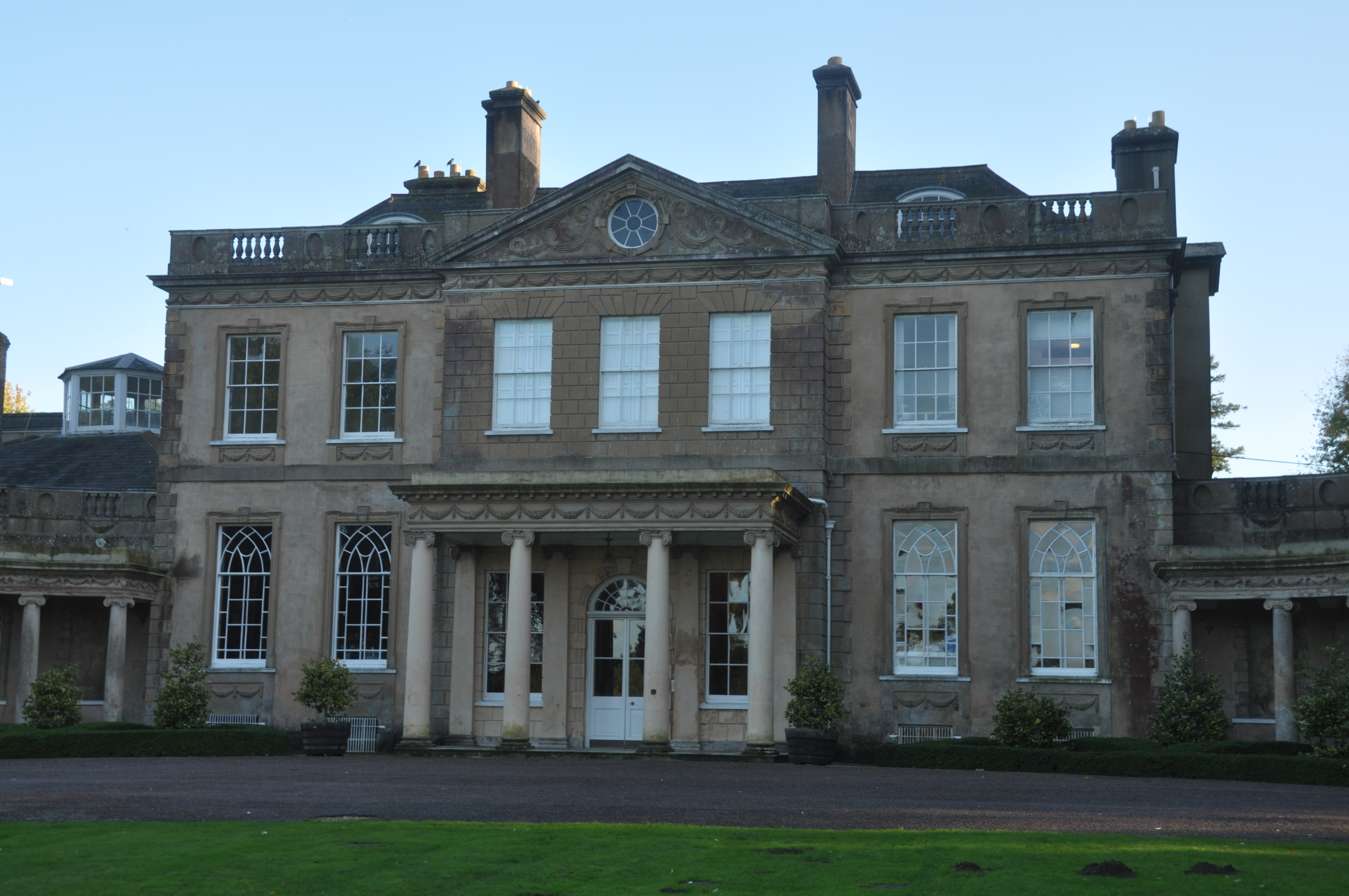
Upton House

Upton House is a country house in the grounds of Upton Country Park on the northwestern shoreline of Holes Bay in the county of Dorset on the south coast of England. It is owned by BCP Council.

== History ==
The land on which Upton House stands was acquired by William Spurrier, four times Mayor of Poole. The house itself was built by his son, Christopher Spurrier, between 1816 and 1818 and its west wing was added in 1825.

The Spurriers had built their wealth on the Newfoundland trade, but this went into decline and this, coupled with Christopher Spurrier's gambling and extravagance, force him to sell the property in 1828 to Sir Edward Doughty, a member of the Tichborne family. Upton House remained with the barons of Tichborne until 1901 when, as a result of massive debts, they sold it on to the Llewellins who held it until 1957, when William Llewellin bequeathed the estate to Poole Corporation (now BCP Council). The council looked at various options to fund its upkeep including plans for a zoo (in collaboration with Gerald Durrell), hospital or golf course. For several years it was rented to Prince Carol of Romania. In 1976 it was decided that, based on public opinion, the estate would be opened that year as a country park and leisure facility for the people of Poole. Following restoration, the house was also opened to the public in 1981.

In 2015, Upton Country Park became part of the newly established Holes Bay Nature Park.

== House ==
Upton House is a Georgian mansion and Grade II* listed building.

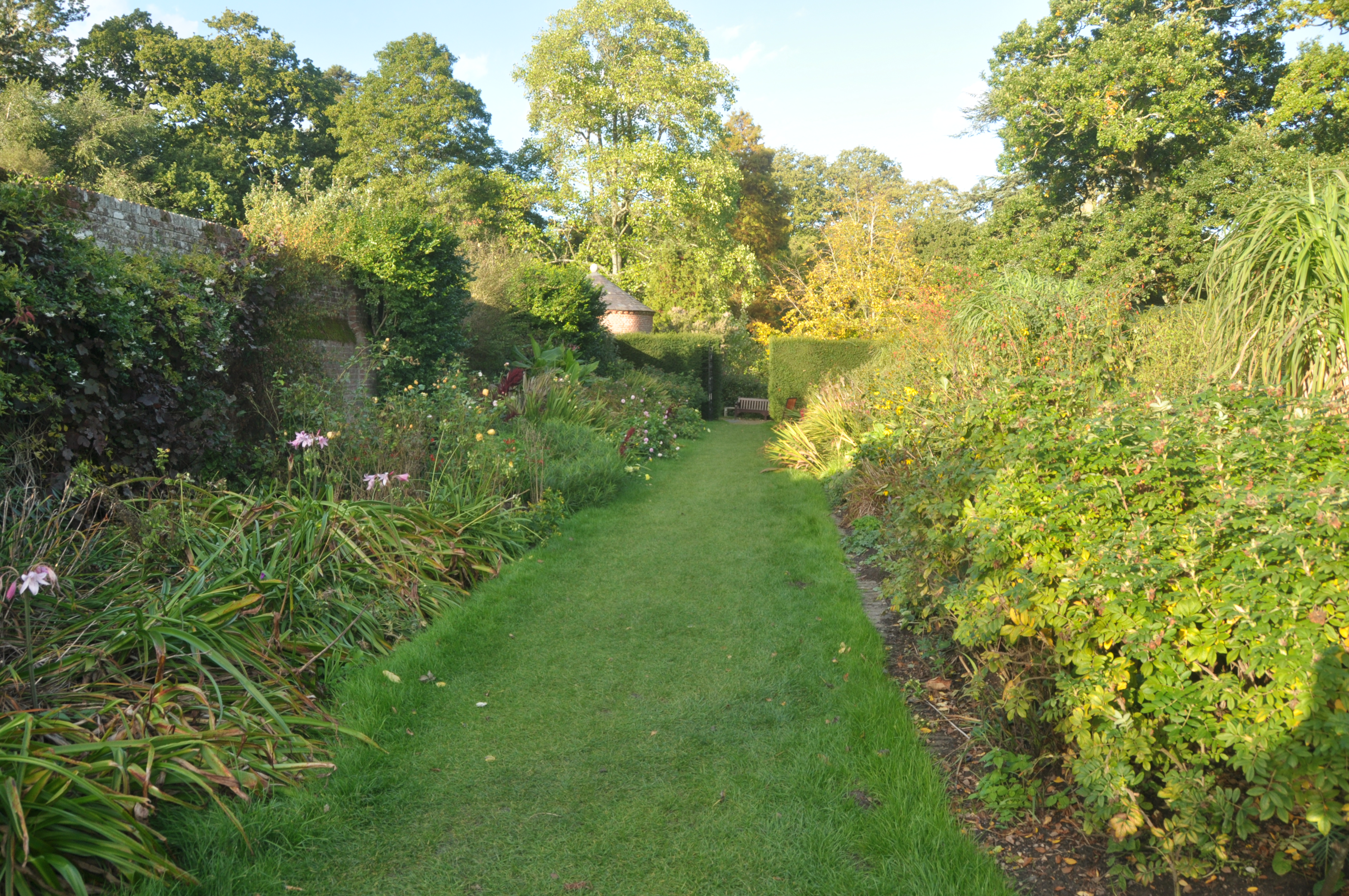
Upton House gardens

== Park ==
The country park comprises over 130 acres of parkland, shoreline and formal gardens. Admission is free and the park is open daily from 8 am until 6 pm.

The park is a trailhead for the Poole Heritage Cycle Route.

Every Saturday morning at 9am Upton House hosts parkrun, a free, five kilometre, timed event, around the grounds of Upton House. Assembly is at 8:50am outside the tea rooms.

== Pergins Island ==
The estate also includes Pergins Island in Holes Bay.

== Owners and residents ==
Christopher Spurrier (1783-1876) built Upton House between 1816 and 1818. He was from a wealthy family of Poole Newfoundland merchants and in 1809 had inherited the family business when his father William Spurrier died. In 1814 he married Amy Garland (1795-1840) the daughter of George Garland who was also a prominent merchant involved in Newfoundland trade. She brought Spurrier a very substantial dowry which two years later contributed to the building of Upton House.

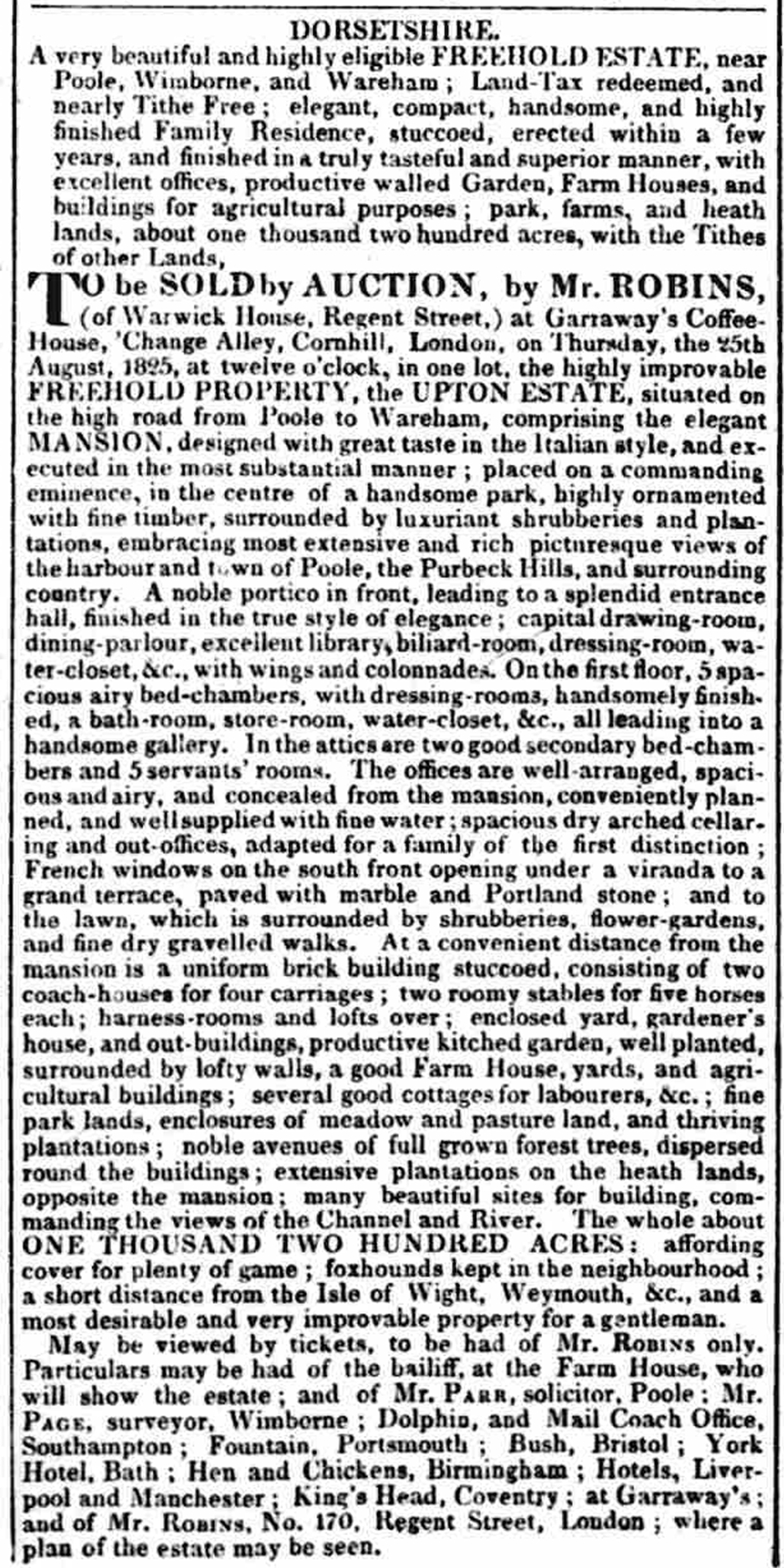
Advertisement for the sale of Upton House in 1825.

Spurrier was a gambler and a spendthrift, with little interest in supervising the family business. However he passionately wanted to become a Member of Parliament and in 1820 he mortgaged his newly built Upton House and sold a family estate to finance his election campaign. He succeeded in becoming the Member for Bridport but after only six months he was unseated on his opponent’s petition alleging bribery. Because of his continued irresponsible spending he was forced to sell Upton House. An advertisement for the sale of the estate is shown. In 1828 it became the property of Sir Edward Doughty.

Sir Edward Doughty, 9th Baronet (1782-1853) was a member of the famous Tichbourne family. He was born Edward Tichbourne but changed his name to Doughty in 1826 when he inherited property from a relative. In 1827 he married Catherine Arundell (1795-1872) who was the daughter of Lord Arundell of Wardour. The couple had one daughter Katherine Mary Elizabeth Doughty (1835-1906) who was later to play a part in the famous Tichbourne case. Roger Tichbourne frequently came to Upton House to visit his relatives. He became romantically involved with Katherine and wished to marry her.

When Sir Edward Doughty died in 1853 his younger brother James Tichborne (1784-1862) inherited the property. James had in 1827 married Henriette Felicite Seymour (1788-1868). These were the parents of Roger Tichbourne and it was Henriette who later became a very important character in the Tichbourne case.

When James died in 1862 his youngest son Alfred Joseph Doughty-Tichborne (1839-1866) became 11th Baronet Tichborne because it was assumed that his eldest son Roger Tichborne had drowned when his ship was wrecked. He inherited the Tichbourne property including Upton House. From 1866 until 1874 the imposter Roger Tichborne who was the subject of the Tichbourne case claimed the house as his property. However his claim was rejected by the courts in 1874 and the property reverted to the Tichborne family.

In 1901 the Tichborne family sold the house to William Llewellin (1856-1927). He was a barrister. In 1889 he married Francis Mary Wigan (1859-1907) and the couple had two sons and one daughter. Unfortunately Francis died in a car accident in 1907 and William remarried in 1908. His new wife was Ada Elizabeth Gaskell who was the daughter of Henry Wigan of Eversley, Winchmore Hill and the widow of Francis Gaskell of Portland Place.

William’s second son was John Jestyn Llewellin (1893-1957) who was a prominent public figure. He was a British army officer, Conservative Party politician and minister in Winston Churchill's war government. He later became 1st Baron Llewellen of Upton. His biography written in 1961 mentions his affinity for Upton House and his attachment to his siblings William Wigan Llewellin (1889-1961) who he called Bill and Margaret Mary Llewellin (1897-1983) whom he called Mary.

In 1957 William Wigan Llewellin gifted the House to the Poole Corporation (now Bournemouth, Christchurch and Poole Council).
