= Moors Valley Railway =

Passenger railway in Dorset, England

Coordinates: 50.85303°N 1.85283°W

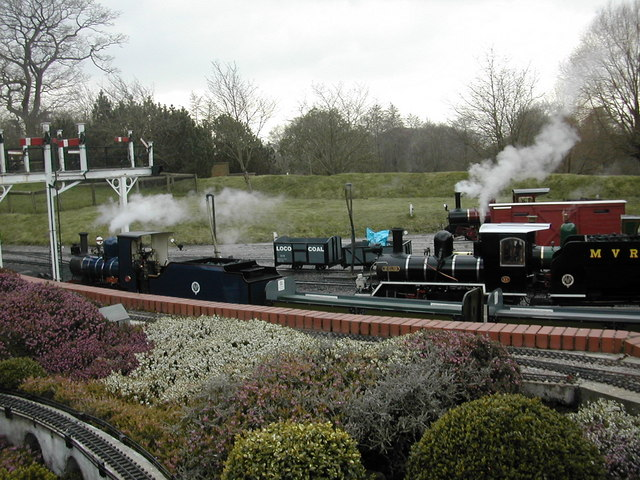
- Locale: Ashley Heath, Dorset, England
- Terminus: Kingsmere

Commercial operations
- Built by: Jim Haylock

Preserved operations
- Stations: 2
- Length: 1 mile
- Preserved gauge: 7 1/4 in (184 mm)
- 1986: opened

The Moors Valley Railway is a 7 1/4 in (184 mm) narrow gauge passenger railway, in the Moors Valley Country Park at Ashley Heath, Dorset, England near Ringwood in Hampshire. There are 21 steam locomotives, 2 diesel locomotives and 1 steam locomotive under construction. The railway is fully signalled, with two signal boxes, one in a Great Western Railway style and one in a British Rail Southern Region style. The latter box made use of a 28 lever Stevens lever frame from Becton Gas Works, as well as containing a 12-lever mini-frame and push-button panel, for the control of the Lakeside area. The railway was constructed at its present location in 1985/86 and opened to the public on the 26 July 1986, after the closure in 1985 of its predecessor at Tucktonia in nearby Christchurch, which had run since 1980. Lakeside Station initially opened in 1989, but was rebuilt in 1995 which included a platform for the mainline. a whole loop of the railway is now roughly one mile, however including sidings totals around 1 1/2 miles

Moors Valley uses a narrow gauge prototype to produce locomotives in which one may sit, allowing running during inclement conditions, as such the railway runs year round. A further benefit of the style of locomotives built to this prototype is that, unlike models, and standard gauge 7 1/4 inch locomotives, the locomotives used on the Moors Valley Railway are considerably more powerful due to the increased boiler size that can be achieved through almost freelance prototypes.

Roger Marsh was a pioneer of this principle and built Tinkerbell; shortly after being shown to the public another engine Talos, was ordered and so started the Tinkerbell-class of locomotives. Coincidentally, when Tinkerbell was seen for sale, it was purchased by the then Tucktonia Railway, becoming its second locomotive. Several more were built at Tucktonia, the last of which being Aelfred, several far more powerful than previous locomotives, before everything was moved to Moors Valley Railway. where more locomotives were constructed along similar lines, with the first being Jason in 1989.

Moors Valley Railway owns approximately 12 locomotives and a further 7 are privately owned. some are owned by the railway itself includes Offa, almost certainly the most powerful 7 1/4 inch gauge locomotive in existence until recently. and Jason, which is a stalwart of the winter season, when the weather is more inclement. as well as other locomotives that are owned by private individuals such as Thor, which presently is the largest locomotive on the railway. as well as Julianna which is the most recent addition to the fleet to date.

The carriages at Moors Valley have no roof, but have a bench in the centre to sit on. Each carriage is approximately eight feet long. There are four rakes of eight carriages, in green, brown, olive, and red liveries, with a rake of four grey carriages often seen on shuttle services on galas.

== Locomotives of the Moors Valley Railway ==
#	Name	Type	Colour	Built	Notes	Image	Status
2	Horace	0-4-2 PH	Black	1999	Small petrol shunter, frequently used to perform morning shunting duties and track checks. It was fitted with a Lombardini Six and a half H.P. single cylinder diesel engine with hydrostatic drive. Rebuilt in 2015 with a Honda 5hp petrol engine. Also known as "Horace The Horrible", a name originating from the cab conditions of their original form.	Horace	Active
3	Talos	0-4-2T	Lined maroon livery	1978	One of the original batch of 5 Tinkerbell Class locomotives built by Roger Marsh in 1978. Overhauled in 2014. Most commonly used for Footplate Experience courses.		Active
4	Tinkerbell	0-4-2T	Stroudley's LBSCR Improved Engine Green	1968	The original Tinkerbell which gave its name to a popular class of locomotive, bought in 1978 by owner of the railway; Jim Haylock. Fitted with a marine boiler. Re-entered service in 2018 following a major overhaul in time for its 50th birthday gala.		Active
5	Sapper	4-6-0	Lined Brunswick green	1982	Rebuilt in 1993. Currently awaiting overhaul. Unique on the MVR for having inside frames and spoked wheels. Based upon the War Dept Hunslet 4-6-0T's.		Awaiting Overhaul
6	Medea	2-6-2T+T	LBSCR Lined Umber Brown	1981	Originally an 0-6-2T. Re-boilered and enlarged in 1985 and is essentially a larger Tinkerbell Class design. She has a water bowser for additional water-carrying capabilities.		Awaiting Overhaul
7	Aelfred	2-6-4T	S.E.C.R. Lined green livery	1985	Design is loosely based on the Vale of Rheidol narrow gauge locomotives.		Awaiting Overhaul
9	Jason	2-4-4T	Maunsell lined green	1989	The first locomotive built at the MVR workshops. Was the mainstay of winter service until Hartfield was purchased in 2007. Overhaul completed in 2018, including new livery and extended chassis.		Active
10	Offa	2-6-2	Furness Railway Red	1991	Sister to Zeus. One of the most powerful 7 1/4 inch locomotives. She has pulled a 25-coach train with 198 passengers and three guards. Re-entered service in early 2019 following boiler work and some work on the motion.		Active
11	Zeus	2-6-2	Black	1991	Sister to Offa. Styled in South African Railways guise with Vanderbilt tender. Re-entered service in 2024 following overhaul.		Active
12	Pioneer	4-6-2	Lined dark Blue	1992	This Pacific is based on Sapper, with several improvements including outside frames and rear pony truck. Now features Walschaerts valve gear.		Active
14	Horton	2-4-0	Lined Red	1991	It is a development of the Tinkerbell class locomotives but has the comfort of a tender. Occasionally used on 'Driver Experience' days.		Awaiting Overhaul
15	William Rufus	2-4-0+0-4-2T,	Lined Red	1997	This Garratt type locomotive utilizes two Horton chassis with a fixed centrally mounted boiler providing a unique driving experience.		Undergoing Overhaul
17	Hartfield	2-4-4T	Midland Railway Red	1999	Originally privately owned and built before being sold to MVR in 2007. It possesses a slightly higher boiler pressure than Jason but is mechanically similar.		Active
None	Ivor	0-4-2T,	G.E.R. Lined blue	1997	Privately owned, built by Tony Crowhurst. Ivor is a development of and is a Tinkerbell class locomotive. Built to 10 1/4 inch dimensions.		Awaiting Overhaul
18	Thor	4-6-2	Black	2005	Privately owned and built. One of the largest, most powerful 7 1/4 inch locomotives built.		Active
19	Athelstan	2-8-0	E.A.R. Lined Red	2005	Privately owned. The design resembles an East African Railways class 24.		Active
20	Emmet	0-4-0T,	Lined Red	2005	The railway's 2 ft (610 mm) gauge locomotive. She has visited several 2 ft (610 mm) gauge railways, Currently at the Old Kiln Light Railway, having previously spent time at the Hayling Seaside Railway, Amerton Railway, and the Purbeck Mining Museum, Norden.		Active
23	Vixen	0-4-0+0-4-0 DH	Maroon	2006	Originally built as a larger diesel locomotive for some pre-season work. Fitted with a 3-cylinder Kubota diesel engine		Undergoing Overhaul
24	Perseus	2-4-2T,	LMS Coronation Blue	2006	Privately owned. Expansion on the Tinkerbell design with Walschaerts valve gear and bigger cylinders. Originally built as an 0-4-2T.		Active
None	Guinevere	2-4-0	Dark Blue Lined	2015	Privately owned. An improved, more powerful version of Horton based on a shortenend Hartfield chassis.		Active
None	Hestia	0-4-2T	LMS Crimson	2015	Privately owned. A classic Tinkerbell design.		Active
None	Aurora	0-4-4T	FR Lined Maroon	2019	Privately owned. Based upon the Single Fairlie "Taliesin" at the Ffestiniog Railway.		Active
None	Julianna	2-4-4T	Lined Dark Blue	2024	Privately Owned.		Active
N/A	AlCo	2-6-2T	N/A	N/A	Being built based on "Mountaineer" at Ffestiniog Railway.		Under Construction

== Special events ==
The MVR holds a number of special events throughout the year, showcasing their own, and visiting locomotives. These events include;

=== Tinkerbell Weekend ===
The MVR often hosts a Tinkerbell Weekend, with several visiting locomotives. The premise of the Tinkerbell Weekend is to gather as many examples of the Tinkerbell-style locomotives as possible at the railway, as it is the home of the "first" Tinkerbell class locomotive. In 2018 Tinkerbell was 50 years old, and the event was held in place of the Autumn gala, in late September to celebrate the locomotive's anniversary.

=== Grand Summer Gala ===
The Grand Summer Gala is the railway's largest event. It features the entire home fleet of locomotives in operation. Alongside the standard passenger trains, demonstration freight trains are run, featuring the railway's large fleet of freight and permanent way stock. The gala also sees the usage of a number of heritage coaches from the Tucktonia railway, albeit not on passenger duties. All of the locomotives in steam take part and follow each other around the track in a parade lap on the Sunday morning.

Other features of the gala include parades of full-size and miniature steam traction engines, a display of classic cars and a model railway exhibition in our carriage sheds.

=== Autumn Gala ===
Every year in September, the railway holds an Autumn Gala - smaller than the summer gala - but still with an intensive and varied service. In 2016, the autumn gala was themed to celebrate the railways 30th anniversary.
