= Avon Heath Country Park =

Park in St Leonards, Dorset, England

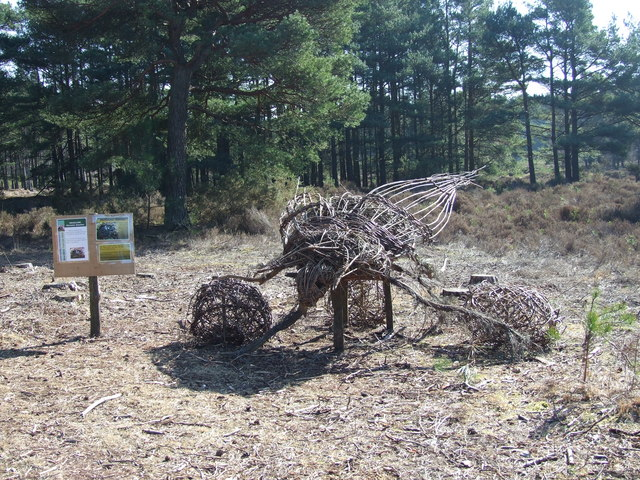
- Woodland sculpture in Avon Heath Country Park
- Interactive map of Avon Heath Country Park
- Location: St Leonards, Dorset UK
- Nearest city: Bournemouth
- Coordinates: 50°49′55″N 1°49′10″W
- Operator: Dorset County Council
- Open: 8 am - 6:30 pm or dusk daily
- Awards: Green Flag

Avon Heath Country Park is a Green Flag–awarded park located in St Leonards, Dorset, approx 10 miles north of Bournemouth.

The park is dominated by acres of lowland and wetland heath, grassland and heather, while pine and birch woodlands make up much of the rest of the scenery. The park contains internationally important wildlife, including rare species such as sand lizards, smooth snakes, Dartford warblers, woodlarks and the silver-studded blue butterfly.

Facilities including a discovery centre, a café that is open daily, picnic areas, a children's adventure playground, and barbecues to hire.
