= Poole Heritage Cycle Route =

The Poole Heritage Cycle Route is a circular cycleway and walk, 7.5 miles long, that takes in the historic points of interest in the town of Poole, Dorset, on the south coast of England.

The heritage cycle route is 7¼ miles long and visits historic sights in Poole town centre, Poole Quay and Upton Country Park. It runs along the shoreline of Poole Harbour and Holes Bay and has "beautiful views of the harbour."
