= PH294 (wreck) =

Abandoned vessel in Holes Bay, Dorset

History

United Kingdom
- Name: PH294, "The Lifeboat"
- Owner: Unknown
- Builder: Unknown (Reportedly American)
- Out of service: 1980s
- Identification: PH294
- Fate: Abandoned in Holes Bay, Poole Harbour; 50°43′34″N 1°59′19″W

General characteristics
- Type: Lifeboat
- Decks: 1
- Propulsion: Single screw

PH294, also known locally as The Lifeboat, is a derelict lifeboat and commercial fishing vessel located on the mudflats of Holes Bay in Poole Harbour, Dorset. Originally an American-built lifeboat, she was later converted for commercial fishing and registered at the Port of Plymouth. She was eventually abandoned in Poole Harbour and her wreck has remained for the last 35 years.

== History ==
The vessel was originally constructed as a lifeboat in the United States. It was then converted for commercial use and registered as a fishing vessel at the Port of Plymouth. The ship has been derelict for over 35 years, situated on the western mudflats of Holes Bay. The hull has gradually deteriorated but the wreck can still float at high tide

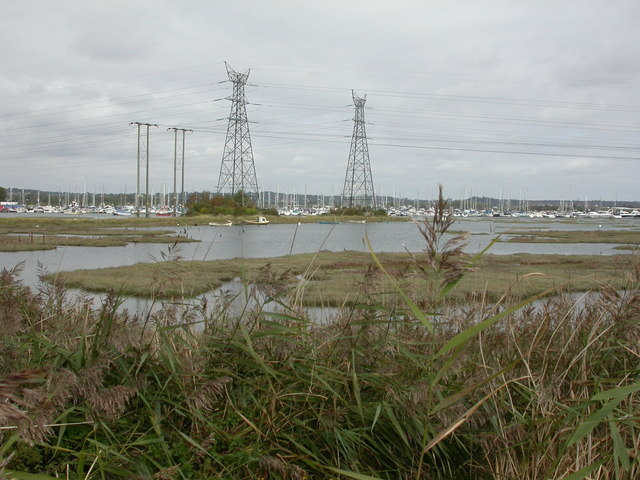
The mudflats of Holes Bay with Cobbs Quay Marina in the background, where the wreck is located.

In the 2010s scrap metal breakers intended to dismantle and remove the remains which sparked a significant public anger from residents and photographers. As a result of this community pressure, the breakers abandoned the removal project, leaving the wreck.

In April 2023 high tide caused the wreck to appear as though it were a vessel in distress leading to a full emergency launch by the Poole RNLI. When crews arrived they confirmed it was the stationary PH294 wreck.

== See also ==
- Holes Bay
- Poole Harbour
