= Sterte =

Area of Poole, Dorset, England

Coordinates: 50.724°N 1.984°W

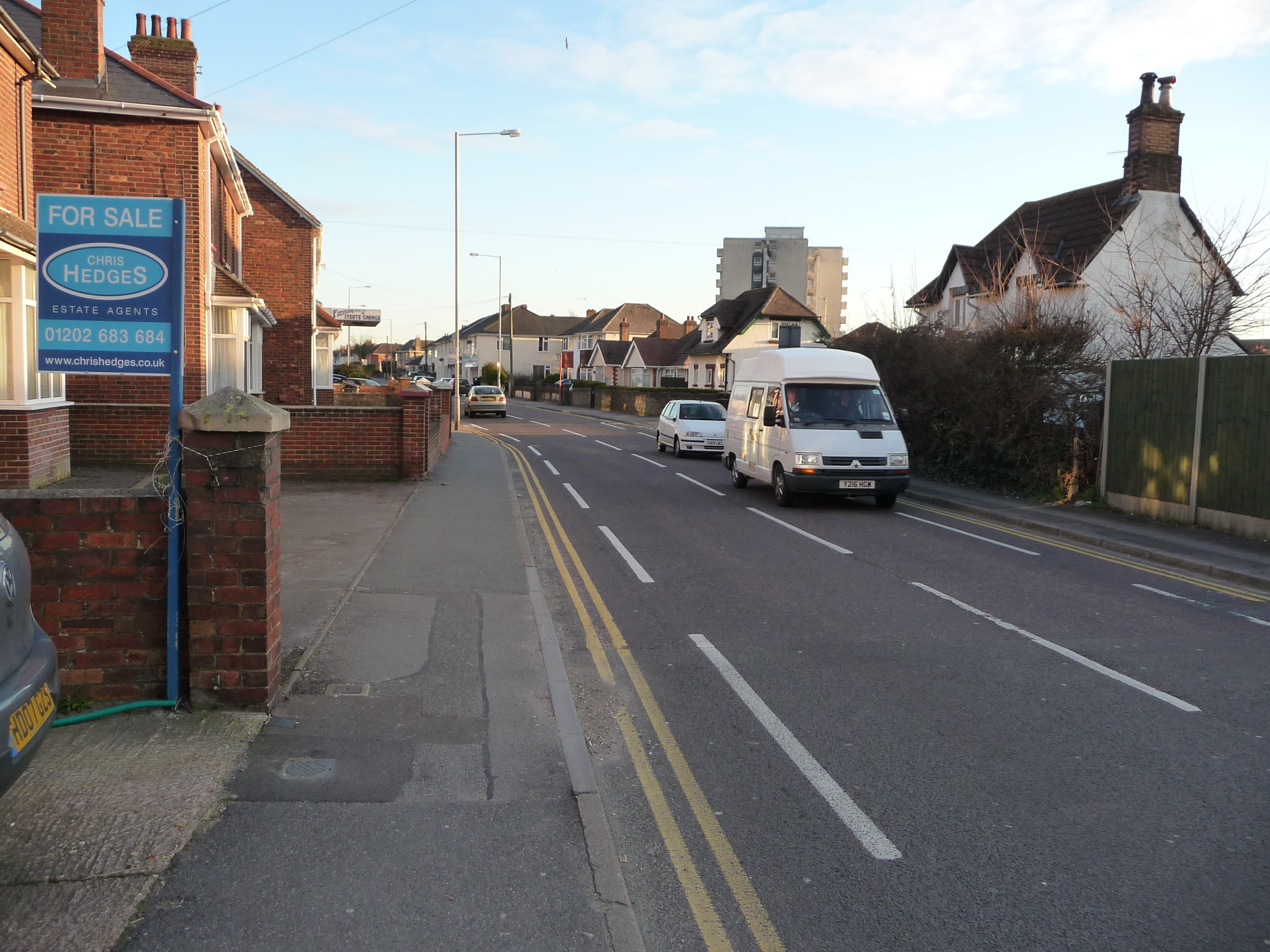
Sterte Road

Sterte is a part of Poole in Dorset, England. It is directly next to Poole Stadium and Holes Bay. It is near to the areas of Oakdale, Upton and Hamworthy.
