= Pergins Island =

Island in Dorset, England

Coordinates: 50°43′58″N 2°0′5″W

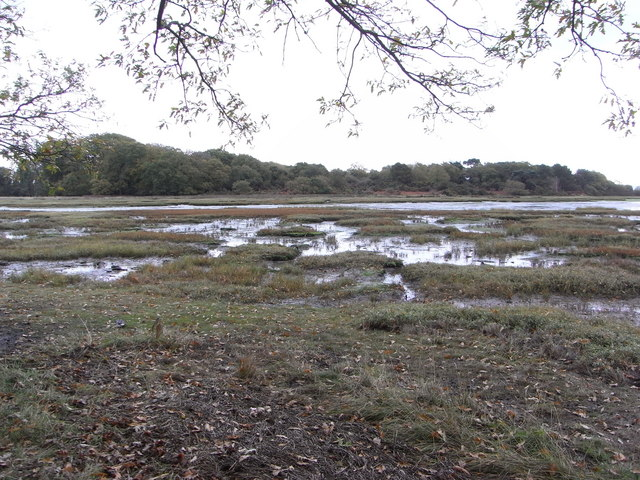
Pergins Island seen across the marshes of Holes Bay

Pergins Island is a small, uninhabited island in Holes Bay, an embayment off Poole Harbour in Dorset on the south coast of England. It is not accessible to the public.

== Geography ==
Pergins Island is located in the north of Holes Bay, north of the railway embankment of the South West Main Line which crosses the bay from east to west. It is roughly oval in shape, has an area of 6.2061 hectares, and is densely covered with broadleaved, mixed and yew woodland.

== History ==
Pergins Island was known for generations as 'Doughty's Island' (pronounced "Dowdy's") after Sir Edward Doughty who bought the nearby Upton House in 1828 along with its estate, which included the island. According to local hearsay, Doughty, a devout Catholic, had given permission for the poor people of Poole and Hamworthy to use the island for camping to escape the squalor of their homes. The Old Town in Poole used to contain slums which became very unhealthy during the warmer summer months and so mothers would take their children to camp on the island while the fathers continued to work, visiting their families when they could.

The island, like the rest of the Upton Estate, belongs to the Poole Borough Council.
