= Woolsbridge =

Coordinates: 50.84°N 01.87°W

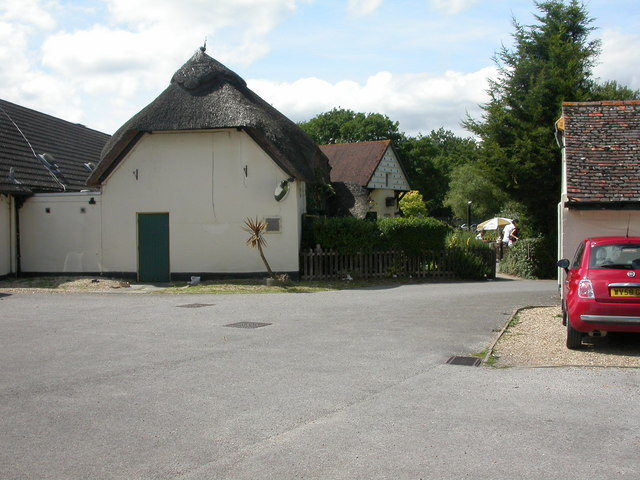
- Woolsbridge, Old Barn Farm

- Location within Dorset
- OS grid reference: SU0905
- Unitary authority: Dorset
- Ceremonial county: Dorset
- Region: South West
- Country: England
- Sovereign state: United Kingdom
- Police: Dorset
- Fire: Dorset and Wiltshire
- Ambulance: South Western

Woolsbridge is a village in Dorset, England. Woolsbridge was formerly under the control of the Earl of Normanton and is a part of the civil parish of Cranbourne. It is located near the New Forest.

== History ==
Woolsbridge was previously the terminus point of the A31 road which was widened in 1762 by an Act of the Parliament of Great Britain. Since the A31 was extended in later years, the terminus is now a roundabout.

Woolsbridge is located near the village of Three Legged Cross. The village is within a green belt. It has an industrial estate near it which serves both Woolsbridge and Three Legged Cross. In 2017, it had a new road built through it to facilitate access. In 2019, there was a further application to East Dorset District Council to build nineteen new units based on spare farmland that had previously been purchased for the construction of the road. The council removed thirteen hectares of land from the green belt registration to permit this. Dorset County Council also considered Woolsbridge as the location for an incinerator despite objections from the local residents. There is also a campsite within it located on a working farm.

The village has its own football team called Magpies and Woolsbridge United F.C. that played in the Dorset Football League.
