= Corfe Hills School =

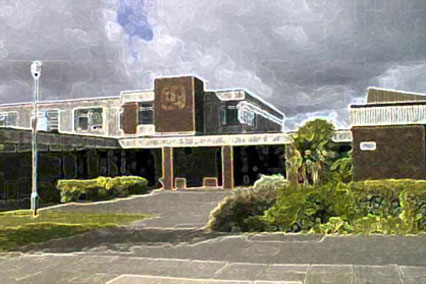

Location
- Higher Blandford Road; Broadstone, Dorset, BH18 9BG; England; 50°46′11″N 2°00′22″W

Information
- Type: Academy
- Motto: High Expectations, Exceptional Individuals
- Established: 1976
- Local authority: Bournemouth, Christchurch and Poole
- Department for Education URN: 136574 Tables
- Ofsted: Reports
- Headteacher: Sara Jones
- Gender: Co-educational
- Age: 13 to 18
- Enrolment: 882
- Houses: Kimmeridge, Lulworth, Sandbanks
- Website: http://www.corfehills.net/

Corfe Hills School is a co-educational upper school in Broadstone, Poole, Dorset, England, in the urban fringe between Poole and Wimborne. The school became an academy in 2011. The school serves Corfe Mullen, Broadstone, Wimborne, Merley and Sturminster Marshall. The current headteacher is Sara Jones.

== History ==
The school was established in 1976. By 2000, the school had 1,600 pupils.

In 2012, the school was reported to be using a £9,000 yurt as a space to encourage reading.

A former chemistry teacher of the school (teaching between 2001 and 2011) was convicted in 2014 and jailed for owning and distributing indecent images and movies of children.

The school was a site of an audio experiment in 2016 with Bournemouth University in which 11 teenage students participated in the listening of radio drama shows.

In 2018, the school had 1,040 pupils. In 2019, the school spent £1.2 million on a renovation of the school heating system.

In 2020, the school had 869 students (less than half the number of students compared with 20 years ago).

In 2022, the school had 882 students.

== Productions ==
For over 30 years the school has produced a musical for a week at the Poole Lighthouse theatre, a regional arts centre. Further music and drama productions take place in the spring and summer terms and a Christmas carol service is held at Wimborne Minster. The school also enters a team into the annual Rock Challenge Dance competition, being placed in several years allowing entry to the regional premier competition. Productions include Guys and Dolls, Hot Mikado, In to the Woods, Calamity Jane, "Anything Goes", Seven Brides for Seven Brothers, Fiddler on the Roof, Oliver Twist, Sweet Charity and many more.

== Sports and Clubs ==
The school has international links, of which its rugby, hockey and Netball tours are the best known. In recent years the teams have travelled to Dubai, South Africa, New Zealand and Fiji. The school sporting facilities include an indoor sports hall and outside area, including football and rugby pitches, a cricket strip, a 400m running track and four tennis courts.

In September 2021, the school launched a cadet unit with Dorset Police.

== County top ==
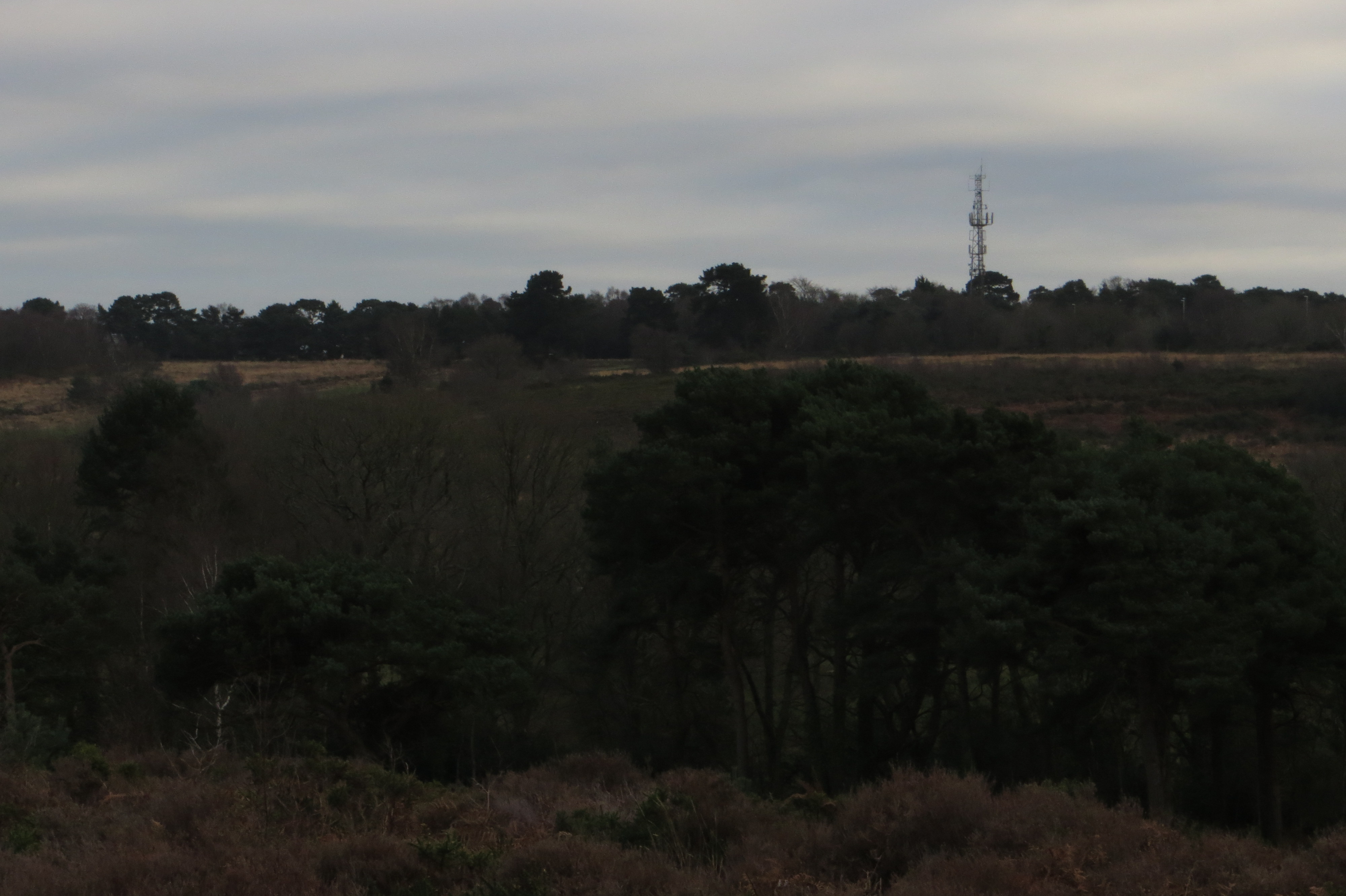
Corfe Hills seen from Barrow Hill. The highest point is near the foot of the transmission mast.

The school is located on the county top for Poole unitary authority, called Corfe Hills, hence the name. The actual summit of the hill is on the Higher Blandford Road near the mobile phone tower by the school entrance. At 78 metres, Corfe Hills is the highest point in Poole.

== Notable former pupils ==
James McVey, the lead guitarist with The Vamps was a former pupil of the school.

== Headteachers ==
- Sara Jones (2026-Present)
- James Sankey (2020–2025)
- Phil Keen (2016-2020)
- Gary Clark (2012-2016)
- Alan Hinchliffe (2003-2012)
- Andrew Williams (c.1990-2003)
- Dr Brian Harper (1976-c.1990)
