= Moors Valley Country Park =

Country park in Dorset, England

Coordinates: 50°51′3″N 1°51′1″W

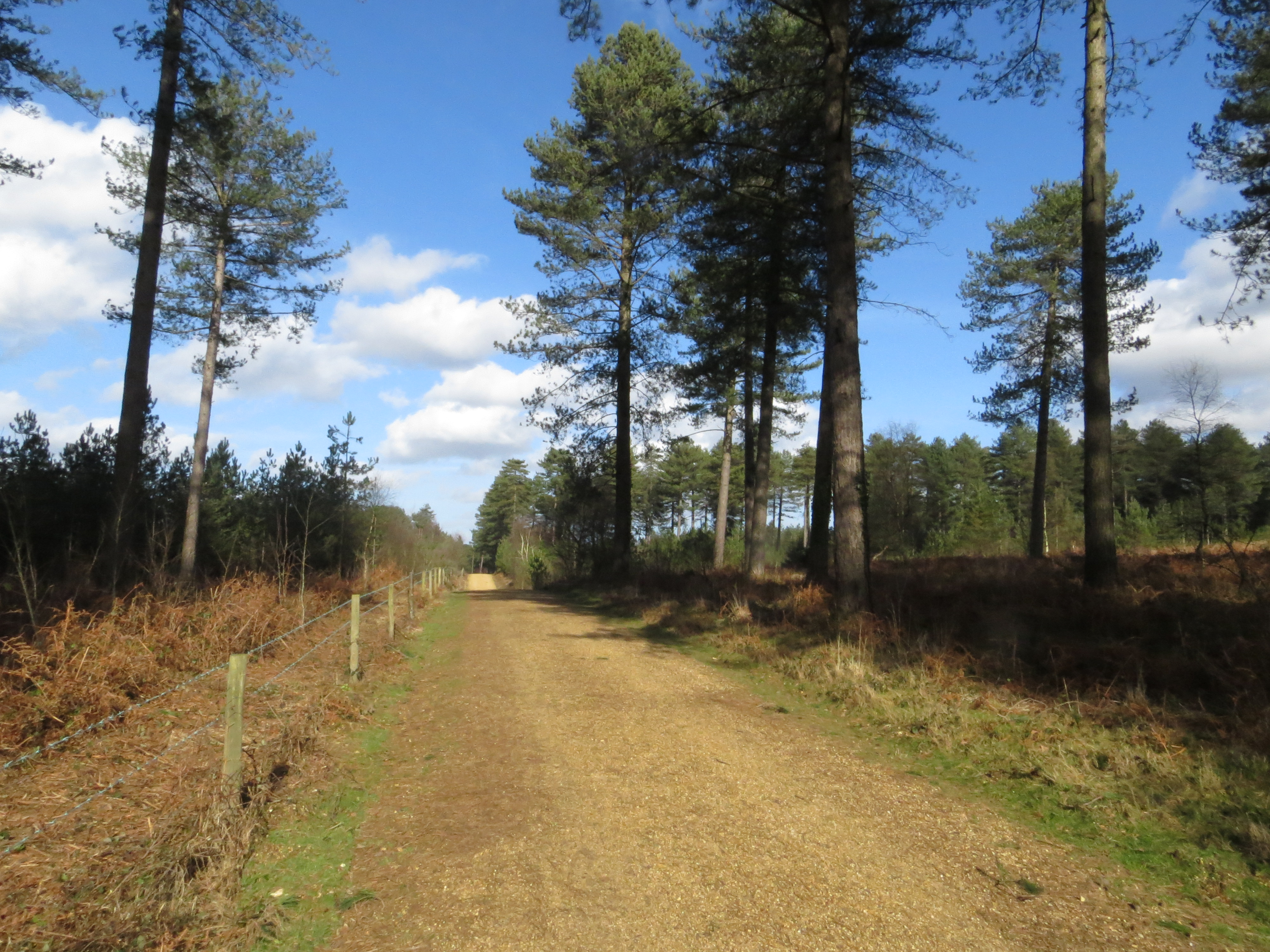
One of the waymarked trails at Moors Valley Country Park

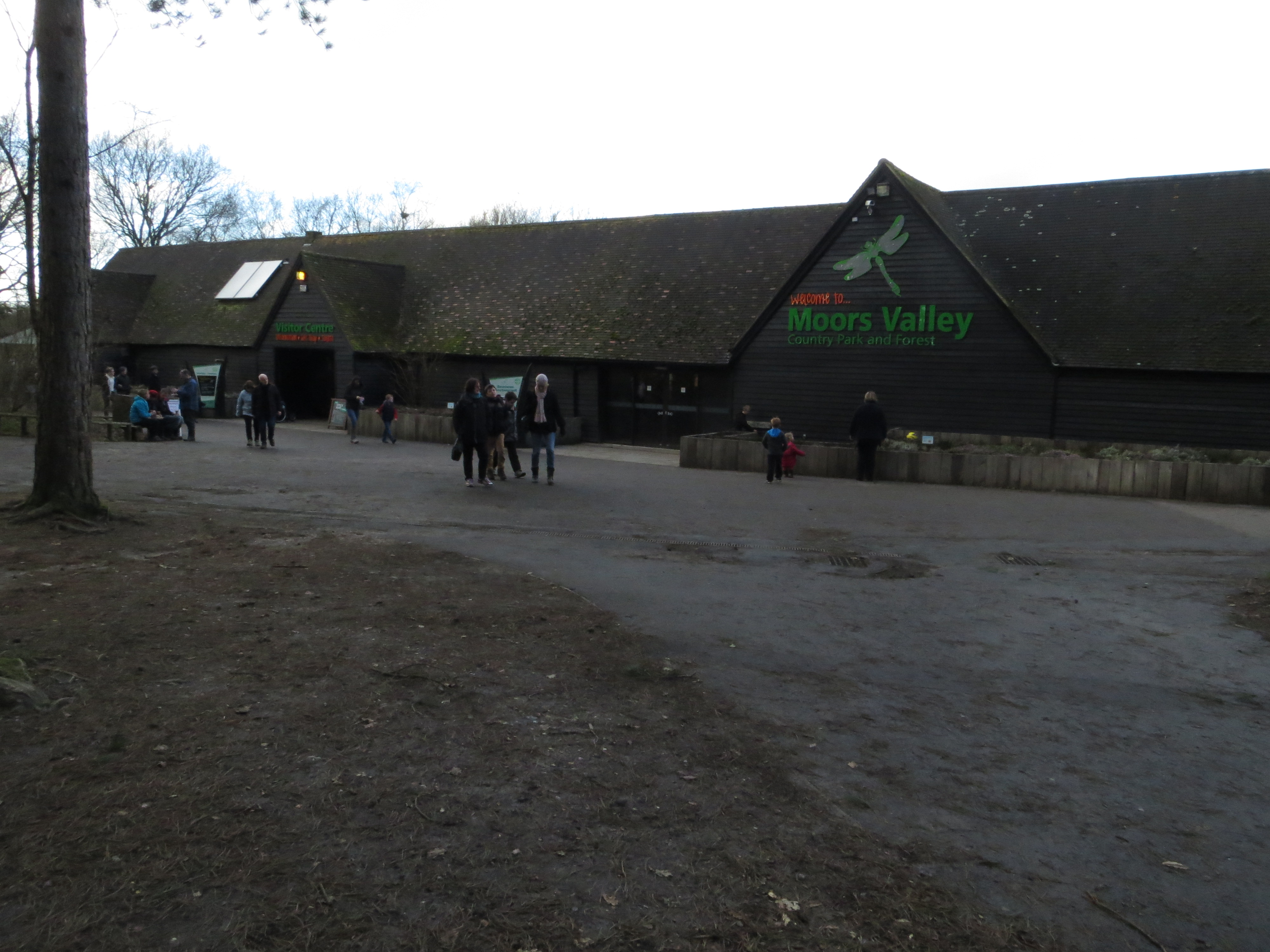
The visitors' centre

Moors Valley Country Park, officially Moors Valley Country Park and Forest, is a Country Park jointly managed by Dorset Council and Forestry England. It is situated in Ashley Heath, Dorset on the border with Hampshire, in the south of England.

The park has adventure play equipment, a tree top walkway, a 'Go Ape!' high ropes course, a visitor centre and restaurant. There is also a narrow gauge steam railway (the Moors Valley Railway), a golf course, lakes, cycle hire, waymarked walks and cycle routes. A ranger service provides a wide range of events and an educational programme. A parkrun event takes place every Saturday morning at 9 am on the park. On 12 May 2026, it was reported that the Tree Top Trail would close after 35 years.

== See also ==
- List of the most-visited attractions in the United Kingdom
