= Holes Bay =

Bay in Dorset, England

Coordinates: 50°44′N 2°00′W

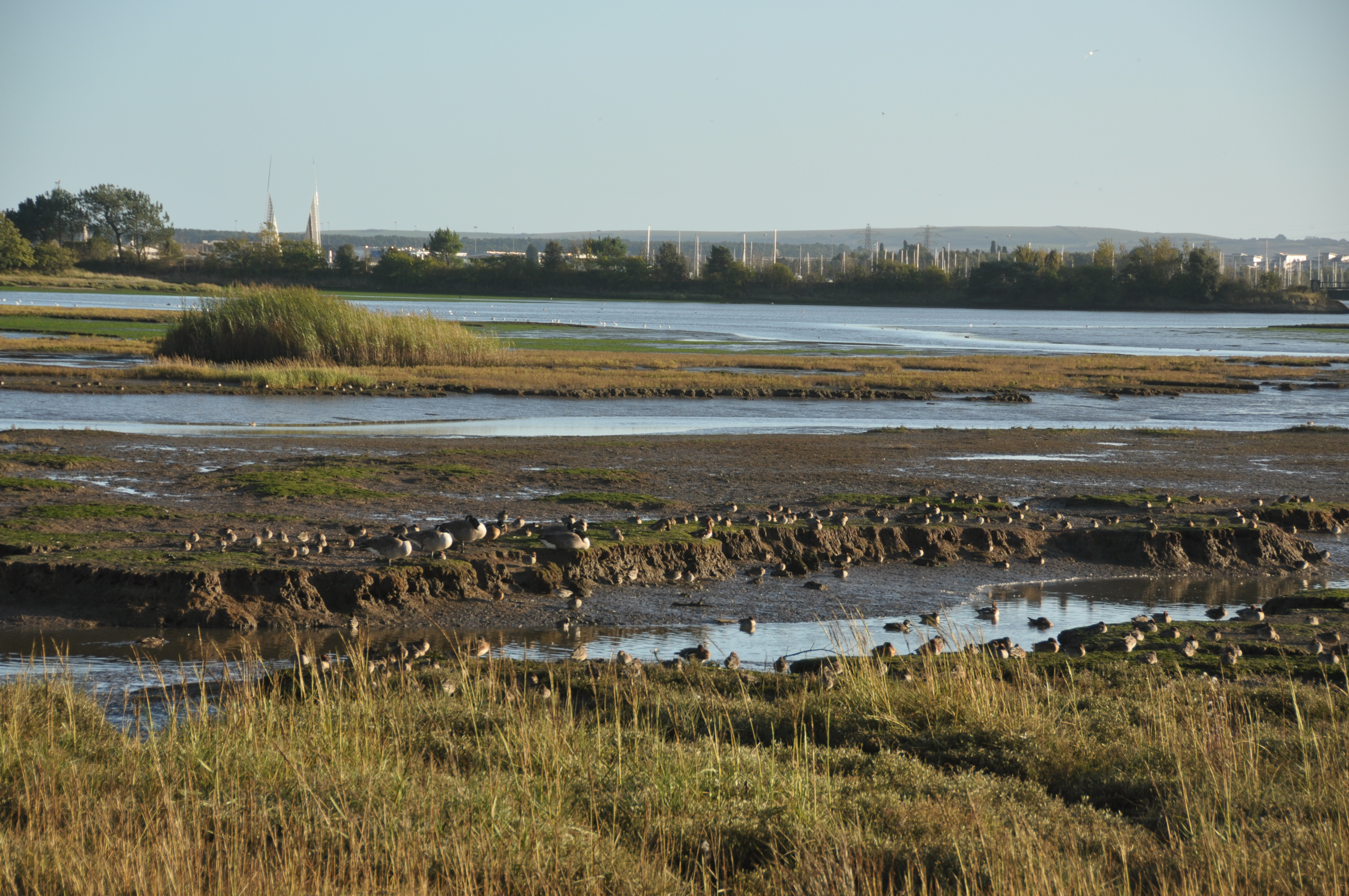
Holes Bay marshes with the Purbecks in the distance

Holes Bay is an intertidal embayment off Poole Harbour in the county of Dorset on the south coast of England. It lies mostly within the Borough of Poole and is close to Poole town centre. It is an important wetland bird haven.

== Location ==
Holes Bay lies on the south coast of England within the Borough of Poole, apart from its northwestern shore which is part of Upton. The bay drains the heathlands around Creekmoor and is bounded in the east by Sterte and Stanley Green, in the north by Creekmoor, in the northwest by Upton, in the west and southwest by Hamworthy and in the southeast by the Old Town area of Poole.

== Description ==
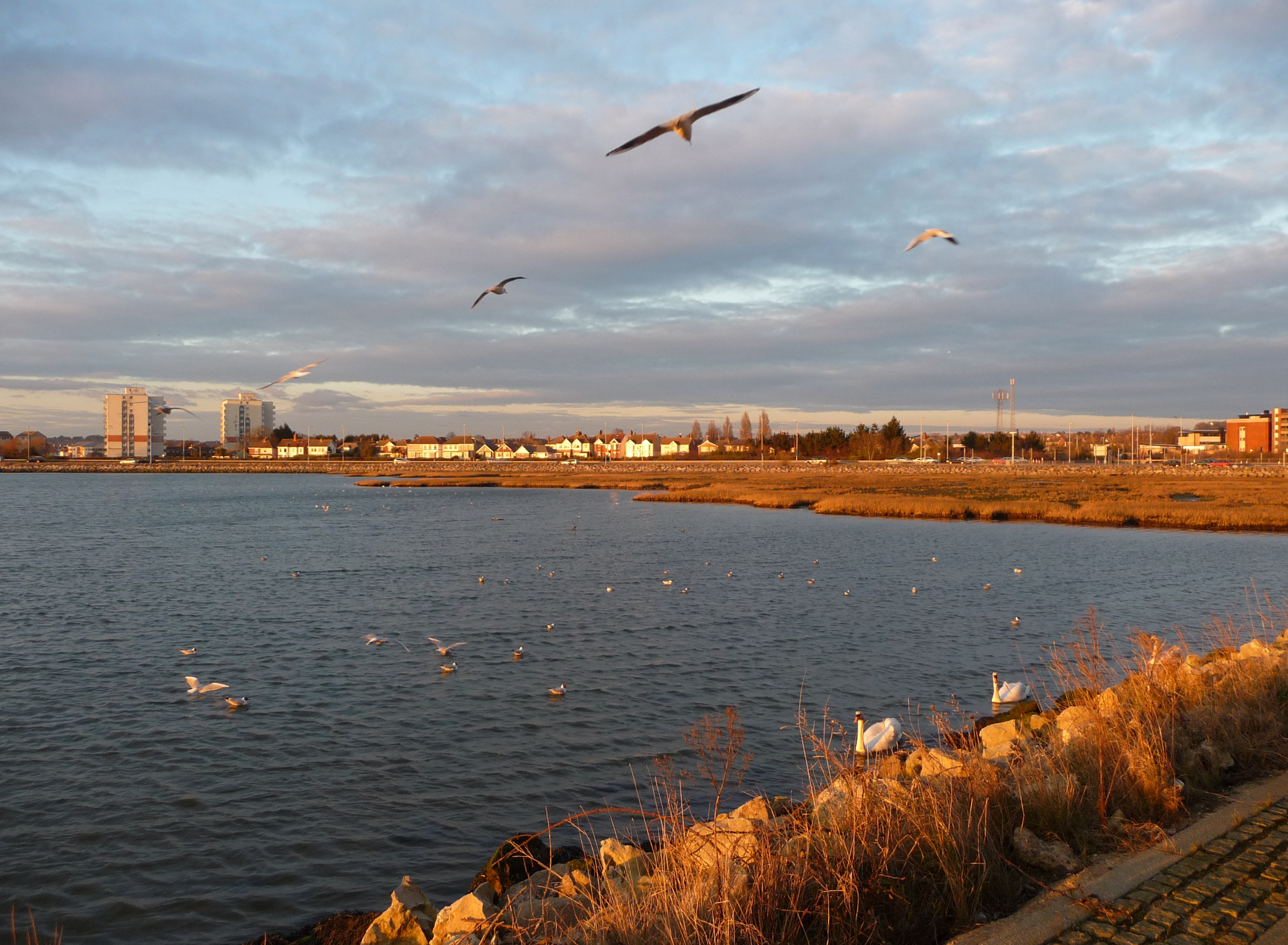
Birds at the southeast corner of Holes Bay

Holes Bay is a tidal inland lake which lies to the north of Poole Harbour. It is a designated harbour quiet area. The exit to the bay is a narrow gat between Lower Hamworthy and Poole Old Town, and runs past the RNLI lifeboat station and part of Poole Quay before entering Poole Harbour itself. Spanning the inlet are two bridges: Poole Bridge and the newer Twin Sails Bridge, opened in 2012. Access to Holes Bay for vessels with a draft greater than 2 metres (6.6 ft) is only possible when the bridges are lifted, which occurs at several fixed times daily and sometimes on request. The new bridge is intended to help reduce traffic jams by ensuring at least one bridge is open to vehicular traffic at any one time.

The northern part of the bay is crossed from west to east by the South West Main Line from London to Weymouth, and Poole railway station is less than one hundred metres from the southeastern corner of the bay. The A350 hugs the eastern shore and the A35 swings past its northern shore. In the northwest is Upton Country Park and Upton House, a public facility owned by the Borough of Poole. There is a marina on the western shore, south of the railway line.

There is a wooded islet, Pergins Island in the north of the bay which is not open to the public.

Holes Bay is the location of the Royal National Lifeboat Institution (RNLI) training school, attached to their Poole headquarters. Uses of the bay include fishing, kayaking and small leisure craft. A large marina known as Cobbs Quay is on the west side of the bay.

There are a number of wrecks in Holes Bay. The wreck of an old tug boat named Southampton is in Holes Bay that broke its moorings and beached there, only to be left to rot away. Situated on the western shore of Holes Bay in Poole there is the wreck of a vessel registered as PH294. It is a former commercial fishing boat and converted lifeboat, likely of American origin, that has been derelict for over 35 years.

== Climate ==
The bay has a small tidal range of 0.6 m (2 ft) at neap tides and 1.8 m (6 ft) at spring tides, and a double high water. Maximum monthly temperatures range from an average of 8 °C (46 °F) in January to 27 °C (81 °F) in August; minimums range from 3 °C (37 °F) to 16 °C (61 °F). Ground temperatures on the mudflats can fall below freezing in winter. The prevailing winds are from the west or southwest, but sea breezes can also blow in from the south and southeast.

== Wildlife ==
=== Fauna ===
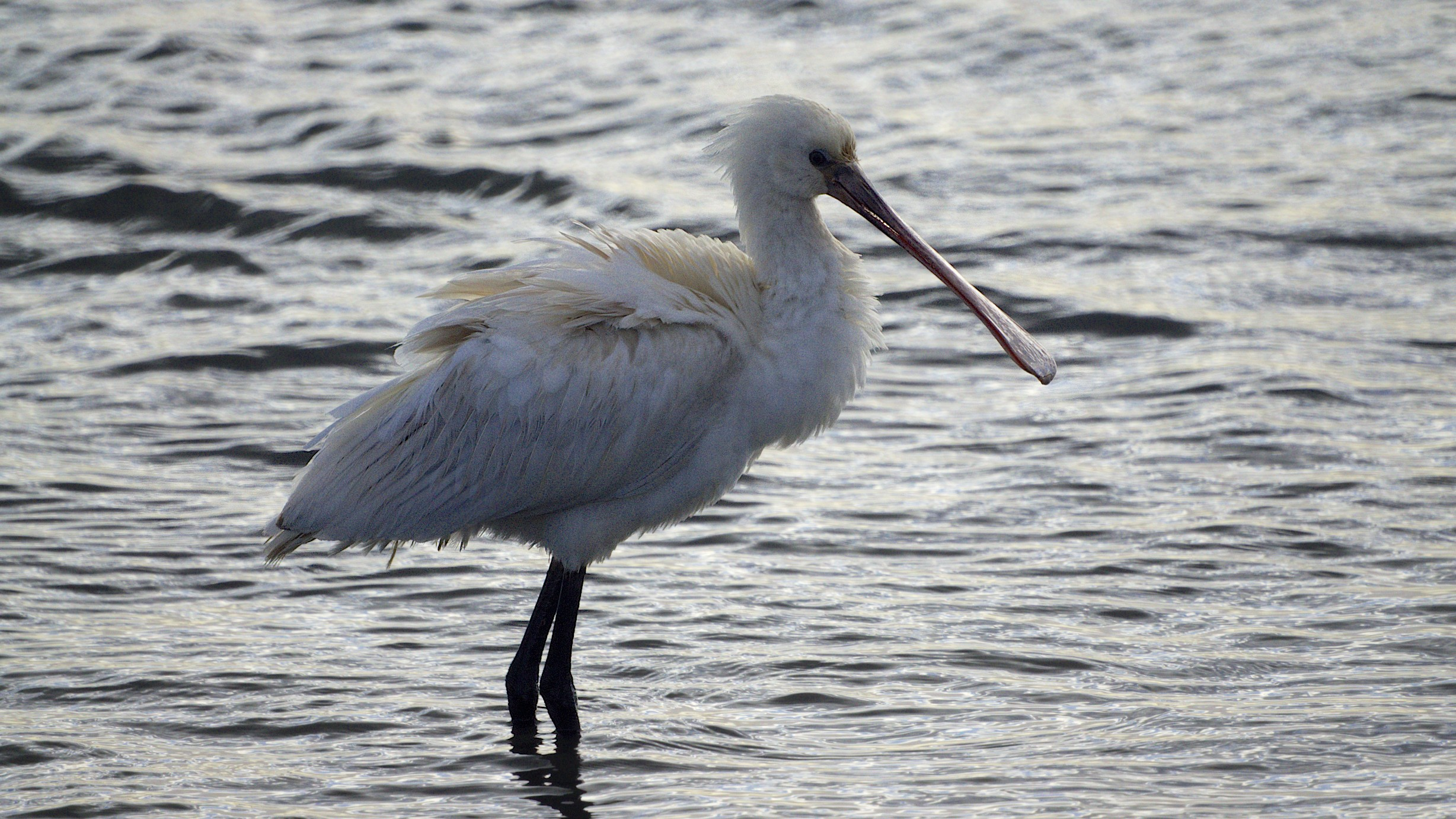
Spoonbill in Holes Bay

Holes Bay is home to numerous wetland bird species including avocet, black-tailed godwit, curlew, kingfisher, little egret, oystercatcher, red-breasted merganser, redshank, spoonbill, teal and widgeon.

The bay is used for fishing. Species that occur here include bass, mullet, flounder, corkwing wrasse and gobies. Marine invertebrates such as king ragworm, clams and cockles are also numerous.

=== Flora ===
The mudflats of Holes Bay were rapidly colonized by cordgrass during the 20th century, covering 63% of the intertidal zone between 1901 and 1924, before receding again between 1924 and 1980 due to erosion and die-back.

Its vegetation includes woodland wild flowers, saltmarsh plants and grassland species including orchids.

== Nature park ==
In 2015, Poole Borough Council, the Dorset Wildlife Trust and other interested parties established the Holes Bay Nature Park to bring local people closer to nature and to ensure the habitat is managed for the benefit of the great variety of wildlife found within it.
