= Ashley Heath =

Village in Dorset, England

Coordinates: 50.8411°N 1.8403°W

- Village
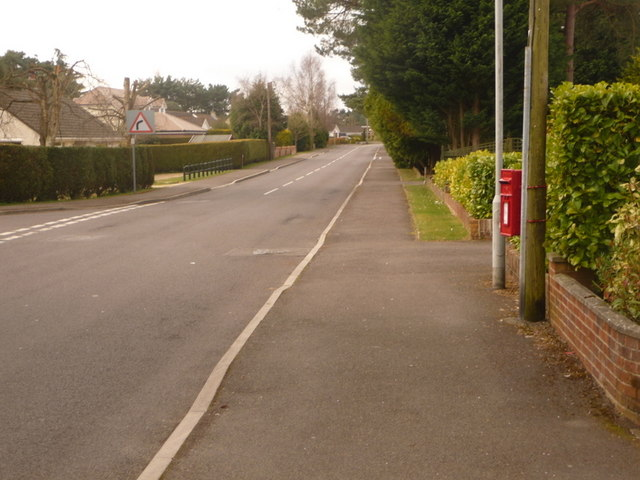
- Lions Lane, Ashley Heath

- Location within Dorset
- OS grid reference: SU113046
- Civil parish: St Leonards and St Ives
- Unitary authority: Dorset
- Ceremonial county: Dorset
- Region: South West
- Country: England
- Sovereign state: United Kingdom
- Post town: RINGWOOD
- Postcode district: BH24
- Dialling code: 01425
- Police: Dorset
- Fire: Dorset and Wiltshire
- Ambulance: South Western
- UK Parliament: Christchurch

Ashley Heath is a village in Dorset, England, adjacent to the villages of St Leonards and St Ives, with which it forms the civil parish of St Leonards and St Ives. Ashley Heath is located 8 miles (13 km) north-east of Bournemouth on the edge of the Moors Valley Country Park.

It was once served by Ashley Heath Halt railway station on the Southampton and Dorchester Railway the route of which is now known as the Castleman Trailway. Unusually part of one platform, including a station name board, remain.
