= Castleman Trailway =

Footpath in Southern England

Coordinates: 50.850°N 1.787°W

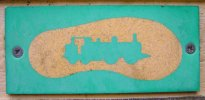
- Waymark on the Castleman Trailway
- Length: 16 mi (26 km)
- Location: Southern England
- Designation: UK National Trail
- Trailheads: Ringwood, Hampshire; Poole, Dorset.
- Use: Hiking

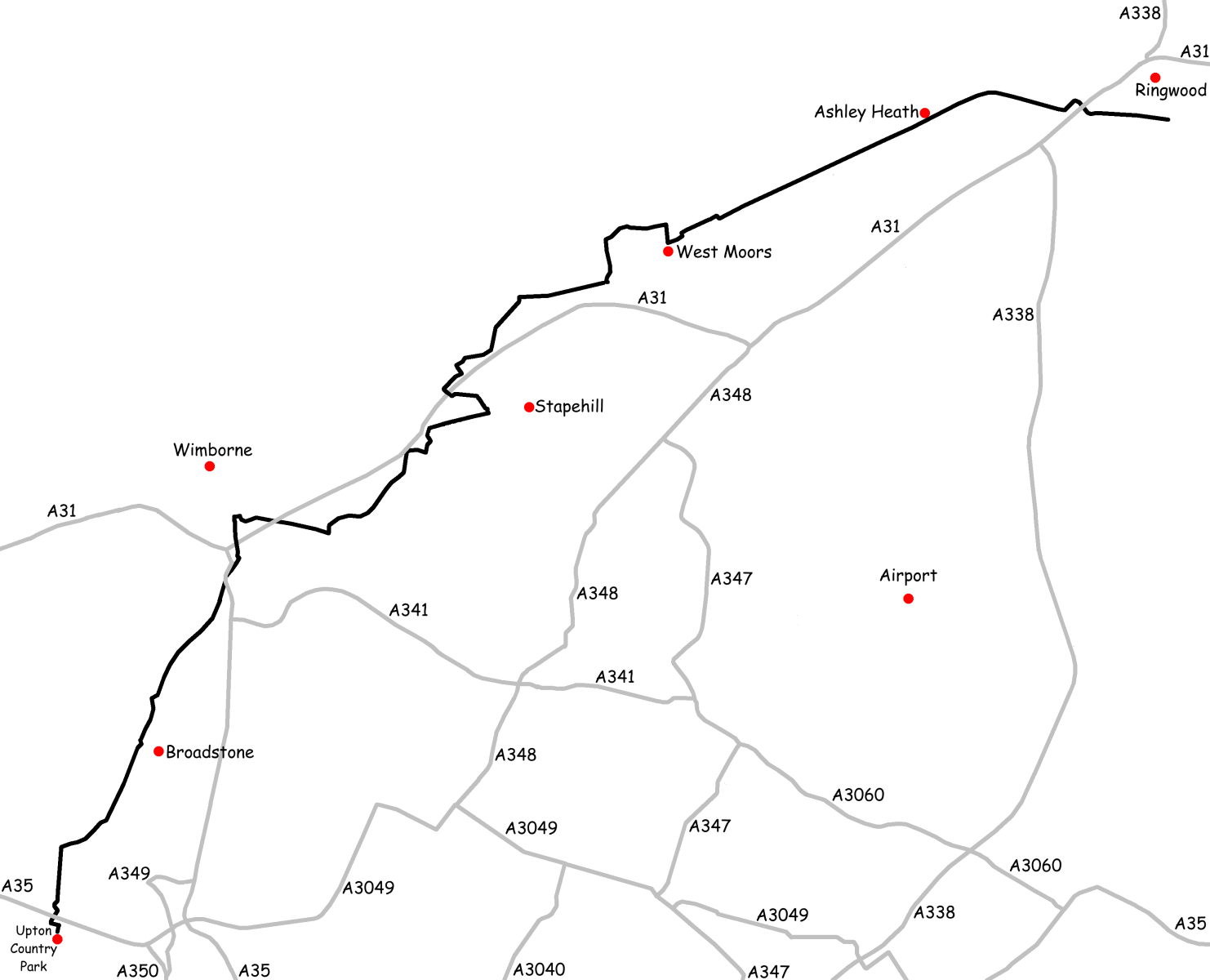
Map showing major roads and the route taken by the trailway

The Castleman Trailway is a footpath in Southern England. Portions of the trailway are also used as a cyclepath but the middle section from East Wimborne (close to The Old Thatch public house) to the River Allen bridge (just south of Wimborne) is not cyclable.

One trailhead is on Barrack Lane in Ringwood and the other trailhead is the car park at Upton Country Park. (From here, a cycle path runs along the sea front, all the way to Poole railway station). The entire Castleman Trailway path is waymarked.

The path passes through the villages of Ashley Heath, West Moors, Oakley, Broadstone and Upton, as well as Upton Heath and Upton Country Park.

The trailway is part of the former Southampton and Dorchester Railway line which ran from Brockenhurst to Hamworthy Junction via Ringwood. It was known as "The Old Road". This circuitous route was promoted in the 19th century by the Wimborne solicitor Charles Castleman, and was chosen because of the need to run through populated areas at a time when Bournemouth was a small village. Many people called it "The Castleman Corkscrew" owing to the number of curves.

== Cycle Route ==
The Castleman Trailway makes up part of the National Cycle Network forming route 25 from Upton Country Park to Wimborne and Route 256 from Wimborne to Ringwood. Cyclists at Wimborne are advised to use the newly built cycle track along Leigh Road between Canford Bottom Roundabout and the Willett Arms Pub at Merley. This is because cyclists are forbidden by local landowners at Canford from using the "official" trailway footpath despite the fact that the railway through Wimborne cannot be walked or cycled because it has either been built upon or is private land.

The Trailway pauses at Ringwood Bickerley Road then again at Barrack Lane, however it can be picked up again at Burbush south of Burley. To get from Barrack Lane to Burbush cyclists have to follow Crowe Hill, Ringwood Rd and then Pound Lane, this route is difficult to walk owing to the fact there is no pavement. Between Burbush & Brockenhurst makes up National Cycle Network route 2 and is completely off-road with the exception of the 1 mile stretch at Holmsley where cyclists have to share the road with cars going 40mph.

== Traffic-free Segments ==
Upton Country Park, Upton - Oakley Hill, Merley 5.1 miles

Oakley Hill, Merley - Uddens Drive, Wimborne (Not the route of the Castleman Railway) 3 miles

Uddens Drive, Wimborne - Station Road, West Moors (Not the route of the Castleman Railway) 3 miles

Station Road, West Moors - Bickerley Road, Ringwood (Involves crossing Horton Road Level Crossing but there are traffic lights to cross safely) 4.9 miles

Embankment Way, Ringwood - Barrack Lane, Ringwood (involves crossing the road multiple times where the railway level crossings would have been) 1 mile

Ringwood Road, Sandford - Pound Lane, Burley (Not the route of the Castleman Railway) 4 miles

Pound Lane, Burley - Station Road, Holmsley 2 miles

Burley Road, Holmsley - Sway Road, Brockenhurst 2.2 miles

== Public transport ==
Using public transport for at least part of their journey means that walkers can plan walks which start and finish at different places, rather than have to circle back to their start point to collect their cars.

=== Railway ===
The Trail may be reached from either Hamworthy Train Station or Brockenhurst at either end, using the line that replaced the Castleman route.

=== Bus services ===
Morebus services X3, X6, 38 all serve Ringwood; X6 serves West Moors; 38 serves the site of Ashley Heath Halt and Trailway. Service 13 serves Wimborne, Canford Bottom, Uddens and Stapehill. Morebus service C16 (limited service: only one journey each direction during college period) travels between the towns of Ringwood, Burley and Brockenhurst and C18 operates from Brockenhurst College to West Moors via Holmsley, Burley, Ringwood, Verwood and Three Legged Cross. Morebus service 125 travels between Ringwood and Burley. Routes 3 and 4 travel between Broadstone and Wimborne; 8 and 9 serve Upton and Country Park and they stop near to Hamworthy Station.

The New Forest Tour runs a seasonal bus along multiple routes. The red route travels between Ringwood, Burley and Holmsley. The blue route travels from Burley through Holmsley and Brockenhurst.

== See also ==
- Long-distance footpaths in the UK
- List of rail trails
