= St Leonards, Dorset =

Village in south east Dorset, England

Coordinates: 50.830°N 1.838°W

St Leonards
- Village
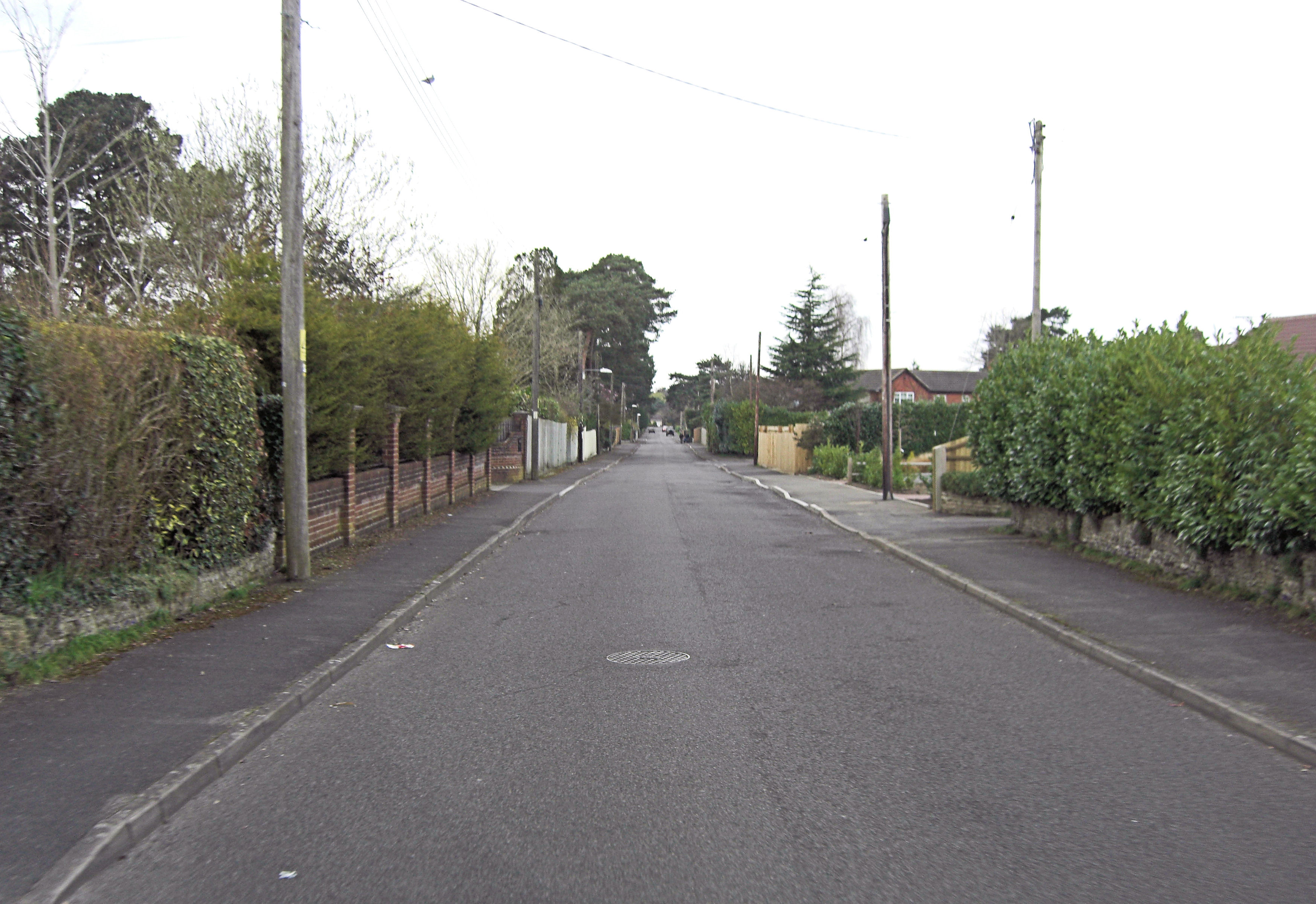
- Braeside Road

- Location within Dorset
- Area: 9.58 sq mi (24.8 km^{2})
- Population: 6,859 (2011)
  - Density: 716/sq mi (276/km^{2})
- OS grid reference: SU115034
- Civil parish: St Leonards and St Ives
- Unitary authority: Dorset
- Ceremonial county: Dorset
- Region: South West
- Country: England
- Sovereign state: United Kingdom
- Post town: RINGWOOD
- Postcode district: BH24
- Dialling code: 01425
- Police: Dorset
- Fire: Dorset and Wiltshire
- Ambulance: South Western
- UK Parliament: Christchurch

St Leonards is a village in south east Dorset, England, situated on the A31 road approximately 2.5 miles (4.0 km) south-west of Ringwood, Hampshire, 8 miles (13 km) north of Bournemouth and 3 miles (4.8 km) north-east of Ferndown. With adjacent St Ives and Ashley Heath, it forms the civil parish of St Leonards and St Ives, which had a population of 6,859 in 2011. The village is part of the historic county of Hampshire (it was transferred to Dorset for administrative purposes following the Local Government Act 1972).

The village has a youth club for ages 10–18 on a Monday and Wednesday, situated in Braeside Park near the village hall and by the scout hut.

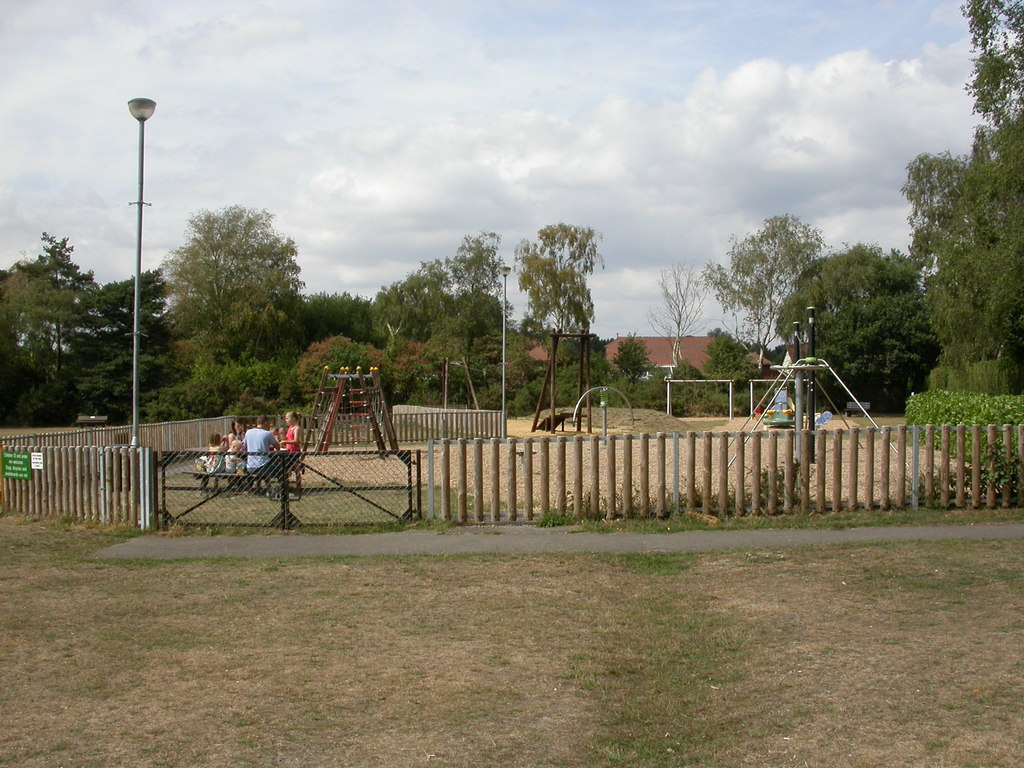
Children's playground on the park

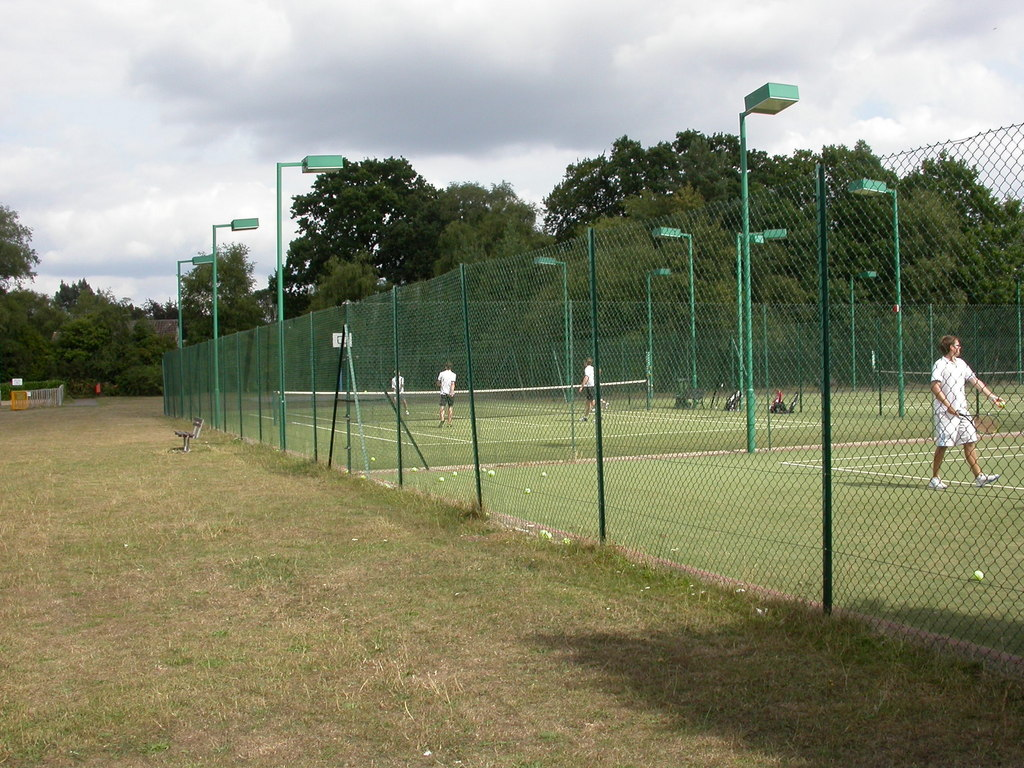
Tennis club
