= Grade II* listed buildings in Poole (borough) =

Poole shown in Dorset

There are over 20,000 Grade II* listed buildings in England. This page is a list of these buildings in the borough of Poole in Dorset.

== Poole ==
| Name | Location | Type | Completed (Note: The date given is the date used by Historic England as significant for the initial building or that of an important part in the structure's description.) | Date designated | Grid ref. (Note: Sometimes known as OSGB36, the grid reference is based on the British national grid reference system used by the Ordnance Survey.) Geo-coordinates | Entry number (Note: The "List Entry Number" is a unique number assigned to each listed building and scheduled monument by Historic England.) | Image |
|---|---|---|---|---|---|---|---|
| Beech Hurst and Attached Rear Area Railings | Poole | House | 1798 | 14 June 1954 | SZ0133190801; 50°43′01″N 1°58′57″W | 1223864 | Beech Hurst and Attached Rear Area Railings More images |
| Church of St James | Poole | Parish church | 1819–21 | 14 June 1954 | SZ0084190438; 50°42′49″N 1°59′22″W | 1217470 | Church of St James More images |
| Church of St Dunstan | Parkstone | Church | 1927 | 30 June 1980 | SZ0443191647; 50°43′28″N 1°56′19″W | 1273602 | Church of St Dunstan More images |
| Church of St Peter | Parkstone | Church | 1900–01 | 14 June 1954 | SZ0340491675; 50°43′29″N 1°57′11″W | 1224865 | Church of St Peter More images |
| Custom House | Poole | Custom house | 1781 | 14 June 1954 | SZ0087290296; 50°42′44″N 1°59′20″W | 1275358 | Custom House More images |
| Hotel Du Vin and Attached Front Area Wall and Railings | Poole | House | Second half of 18th century | 14 June 1954 | SZ0079790366; 50°42′47″N 1°59′24″W | 1225272 | Hotel Du Vin and Attached Front Area Wall and Railings More images |
| Kinges Halle | Poole | Warehouse | 15th century | 14 June 1954 | SZ0084090308; 50°42′45″N 1°59′22″W | 1275357 | Kinges Halle More images |
| Landfall and attached screen walls and terrace | Poole | House | 1938 | 16 January 1981 | SZ0426789454; 50°42′21″N 1°56′25″W | 1267436 | Upload Photo |
| Church of St Aldhelm | Poole | Parish church | 1911 | 14 June 1954 | SZ0584691800; 50°43′33″N 1°55′07″W | 1266563 | Church of St Aldhelm More images |
| St Anne's Hospital | Canford Cliffs | Hospital | 1909–12 | 5 October 1988 | SZ0524288784; 50°41′55″N 1°55′38″W | 1267416 | St Anne's Hospital More images |
| The Guildhall | Poole | Guildhall | 1761 | 14 June 1954 | SZ0100090562; 50°42′53″N 1°59′14″W | 1266739 | The Guildhall More images |
| The Old Rectory | Hamworthy | Manor house | c. 1650 | 14 June 1954 | SY9983290586; 50°42′54″N 2°00′13″W | 1275403 | Upload Photo |
| United Reformed Church and Attached Wall and Railings to North East | Poole | Church | c. 1777 | 14 June 1954 | SZ0124790444; 50°42′49″N 1°59′01″W | 1275356 | United Reformed Church and Attached Wall and Railings to North East More images |
| Upton House | Upton | Country house | Early 19th century | 8 August 1972 | SY9931092991; 50°44′12″N 2°00′40″W | 1225477 | Upton House More images |
| West End House and Attached Front Garden Railings and Gate | Poole | Merchant's house | Mid 18th century | 14 June 1954 | SZ0077490438; 50°42′49″N 1°59′25″W | 1217517 | West End House and Attached Front Garden Railings and Gate More images |
| 73 High Street | Poole | House | Early 16th century | 30 June 1980 | SZ0111390522; 50°42′52″N 1°59′08″W | 1217483 | 73 High Street More images |
| 12 and 14 High Street | Poole | House | Late 16th to early 17th century | 28 March 1974 | SZ0094090389; 50°42′47″N 1°59′17″W | 1275413 | 12 and 14 High Street |
| 20 Market Street | Poole | Town house | Mid 18th century | 14 June 1954 | SZ0095790531; 50°42′52″N 1°59′16″W | 1275386 | 20 Market Street More images |

== See also ==
- Grade I listed buildings in Dorset
