= Eyre Coote (East India Company officer) =

British army officer and politician (1726–1783)

Lieutenant-General Sir Eyre Coote KB
- Portrait attributed to Henry Morland, c. 1763

Member of Parliament; for Poole
- In office 1774–1780
- Preceded by: Joshua Mauger; Thomas Calcraft
- Succeeded by: Joseph Gulston; William Morton Pitt

Personal details
- Born: c. 1726 Kilmallock, County Limerick
- Died: 28 April 1783 (aged 56–57) Madras, Madras Presidency
- Resting place: St Andrew's Church, Rockbourne
- Awards: Order of the Bath
- Nickname: Coote the Brave

Military service
- Allegiance: Great Britain; East India Company
- Branch/service: British Army; Bengal Army
- Years of service: 1745–1783
- Rank: Lieutenant-general
- Commands: 84th Regiment of Foot
- Battles/wars: Jacobite rising of 1745; Second Carnatic War; Seven Years' War; Battle of Plassey; Battle of Wandiwash; Second Anglo-Mysore War

Lieutenant-General Sir Eyre Coote, KB (c. 1726 – 28 April 1783) was a British army officer and politician who represented Leicester and Poole in the House of Commons of Great Britain from 1768 to 1780. He is best known for his many years of service with the Bengal Army in India, where his victory at the Battle of Wandiwash was considered a turning point in the struggle for control over the region between Britain and France. Coote was known by his sepoy troops as Coote Bahadur (Coote the Brave).

== Early life ==
A member of the Coote family headed by the Earl of Mountrath, he was born in Kilmallock, near Limerick, Ireland, the son of the Reverend Chidley Coote and Jane Evans, daughter of George Evans, and sister of George Evans, 1st Baron Carbery. He entered the 27th Regiment of Foot. He first saw active service in the Jacobite rising of 1745. Carrying the regimental colours into the Battle of Falkirk Muir, after the unit was routed several officers of the regiement, including Coote, were court-martialed. He accordingly was suspended from service. Afterwards he served in Roth's Dragoons and the 37th Foot, becoming a Captain in 1752. In July 1755 the obtained a captaincy in the 39th Foot, the first regular British regiment to serve in India.

== Career in India ==
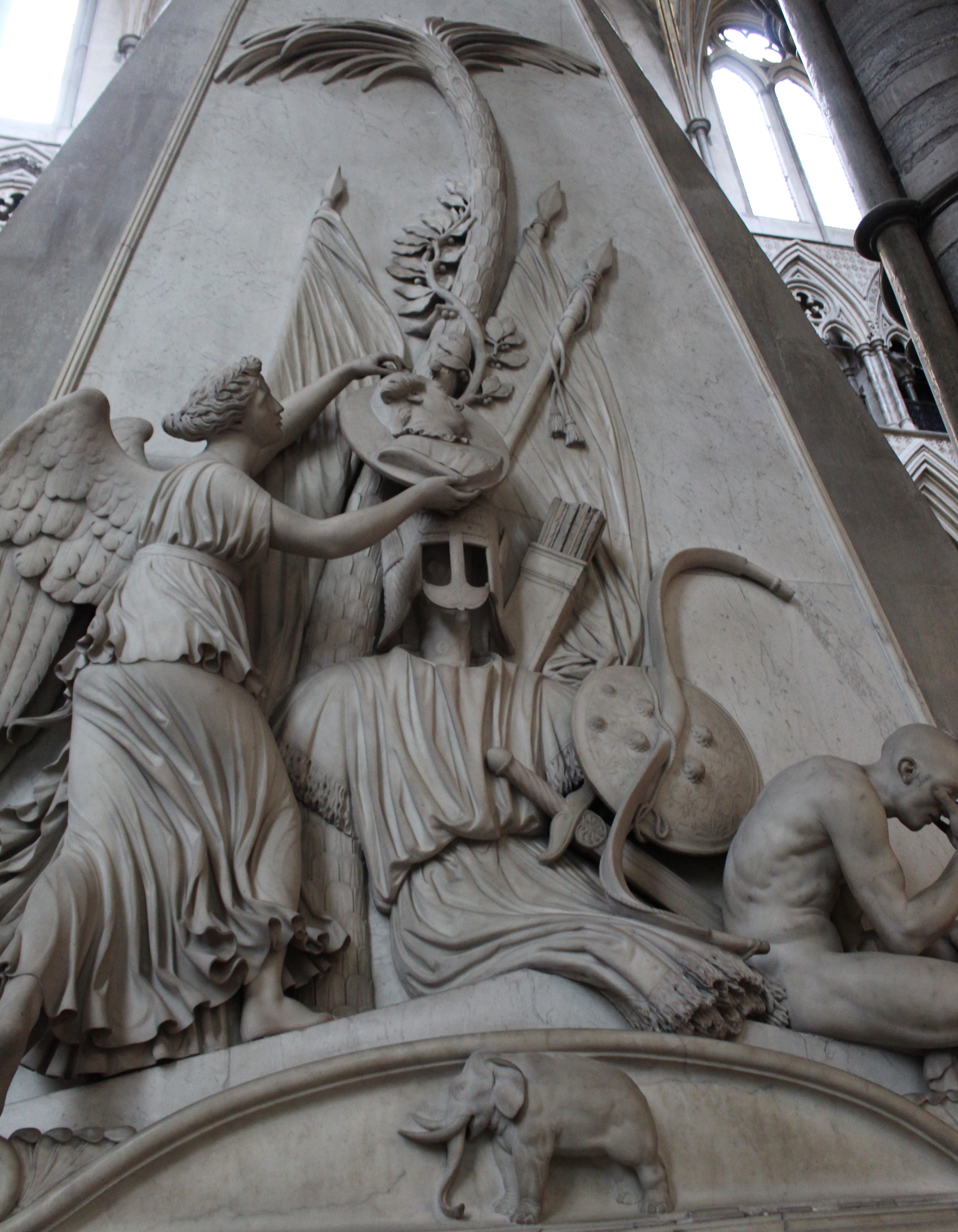
Memorial at Westminster Abbey by Thomas Banks

=== Recapture of Calcutta ===
In 1756 a part of the regiment, then quartered at Madras, was sent forward to join Robert Clive in his operations against Calcutta which had recently been captured by the forces of the Nawab of Bengal, which had been followed by the Black Hole of Calcutta. The city was reoccupied without difficulty in January 1757. However, Coote and Clive argued so violently over who should reoccupy Fort William that they almost fired at each other, which began a lifelong rivalry and hatred between the two men.

=== Plassey ===
Coote was soon given the local rank of major for his good conduct in surprising the camp of the Nawab of Bengal. Soon afterwards came the Battle of Plassey, which would probably never have taken place but for Coote's advice at the council of war; after the defeat of the Nawab he led a detachment in pursuit of the French for 400 miles under extraordinary difficulties. His conduct won him the rank of lieutenant colonel and the command of the 84th Regiment of Foot, newly raised in Britain for Indian service, but his exertions had seriously damaged his health.

=== Wandiwash ===
In October 1759 Coote's regiment arrived to take part in the decisive struggle between French and British in the Carnatic. He took command of the forces at Madras, where a French siege had recently been defeated, and on 22 January 1760 led them in the decisive victory of Wandiwash.

After a time the remnants of Lally's forces were besieged in Pondicherry. For some reason Coote was not entrusted with the siege operations, but loyally supported William Monson, who brought the siege to a successful end on 15 January 1761. In the latter year he sat for Maryborough in the Irish House of Commons.

Soon afterwards Coote was given the command of the British East India Company's forces in Bengal, and settled a serious dispute between the Nawab Mir Qasim and a powerful subordinate.

== Member of Parliament ==
In 1762, he returned to Britain, receiving a jewelled sword of honour from the company and other rewards for his great services. In 1771 he was made a Knight of the Order of the Bath. In 1768, he was elected M.P. for the borough of Leicester in the Parliament of Great Britain, before transferring to Poole, nearer his Hampshire estates, in 1774. He relinquished the seat in 1780 after his last return to India.

== Return to India ==
In 1779 he sailed on Stafford to India to assume the role of commander in chief of the company forces in India. He allied himself to Warren Hastings, the Governor-General who generally deferred to him and gave him a free hand over military matters, in opposition to Hasting's opponents on the ruling Council Edward Wheler and Philip Francis. He spent much of his time visiting outlying garrisons and chose to attend meetings of the Calcutta Council only when it was necessary to pass some important measure. Without Coote's support, Hastings was likely to be outvoted on the council. This situation only ended when Francis returned home where he began to stir up criticism of Hastings' conduct which ultimately led to his failed impeachment.

=== Second Anglo-Mysore War ===
Following Hyder Ali's opening of the Second Anglo-Mysore War in southern India, Coote returned to active service. It was not until 1 June 1781 that Coote struck the first heavy blow against Hyder in the decisive Battle of Porto Novo. The battle was won by Coote against odds of five to one. It was followed up by another hard-fought battle at Pollilur (the scene of an earlier triumph of Hyder over a British force) on 27 August, in which the British won another success, and by the rout of the Mysore troops at Sholinghur a month later. His last service was the arduous campaign of 1782, which finally shattered a constitution already gravely impaired by hardship and exertions.

== Death ==
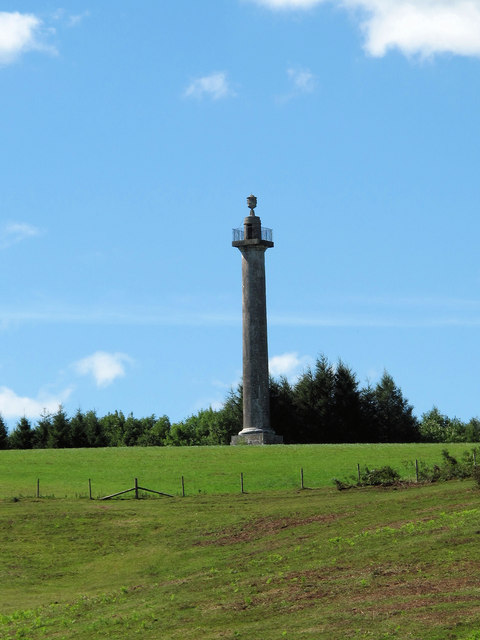
Monument to Eyre Coote in West Park

In 1782, Coote relinquished his command, and moved to Calcutta. However amid increasing French harassment, and ruptures between the governor and new commander in chief, Hastings persuaded Coote to return to his command. He died of a stroke soon after returning to Madras on 28 April 1783. His body was brought back to England and buried in the parish church of Rockbourne in Hampshire, the location of his estate.

=== Legacy ===
Coote is generally remembered for his victory at Wandiwash and capture of Pondicherry which were decisive moments in the struggle between Britain and France for dominance in India. Although he often quarrelled with other British officers and officials, Coote was adored by the sepoy troops under his command. Following his death a monument was erected to him in Westminster Abbey and another, in the form of a tall column, within his estate at West Park, Rockbourne, Hampshire. His nephew was Eyre Coote who served as Governor of Jamaica.

He had married Susannah Hutchinson in 1769, a daughter of Charles Hutchinson, Governor of St. Helena. They had no children, and his property, worth over £200,000, was left to his brother, Doctor Charles Coote, Dean of Kilfenora, in County Clare, Ireland. In his autobiography the American General and Secretary of State Colin Powell claims direct descent from Coote's identically named nephew Eyre Coote while the latter was serving as Governor of Jamaica, which has led to Powell sometimes being incorrectly referred to as a direct descendant of the elder General Coote.

== Bibliography ==
- Harvey, Robert. Clive: The life and Death of a British Emperor. Hodder and Stoughton, 1998.
- Sheppard E. W. Coote Bahadur: A Life of Lieutenant-General Sir Eyre Coote, KB Werner Laurie 1956
- Turnbull, Patrick. Warren Hastings. New English Library, 1975.

Parliament of Ireland
Preceded by Warner Westenra; Bartholomew William Gilbert	Member of Parliament for Maryborough; 1761; With: William Gilbert	Succeeded by William Gilbert; John Parnell
Parliament of Great Britain
Preceded by John Darker; Anthony James Keck	Member of Parliament for Leicester; 1768–1774; With: Booth Grey	Succeeded by Booth Grey; John Darker
Preceded by Thomas Calcraft; Joshua Mauger	Member of Parliament for Poole; 1774–1780; With: Joshua Mauger	Succeeded by Joseph Gulston; William Morton Pitt
Military offices
Preceded by John Carnac	Commander-in-Chief, India; 1761–1763	Succeeded by Thomas Adams
Preceded by Hugh Warburton	Colonel of the 27th Regiment of Foot; 1771–1773	Succeeded by The Lord Clarina
Preceded by Sir George Gray	Colonel of the 37th Regiment of Foot; 1773–1783	Succeeded by Sir John Dalling
Preceded by Giles Stibbert	Commander-in-Chief, India; 1779–1783	Succeeded by Giles Stibbert
