= List of churches in Poole =

The following is a list of churches in Poole and Upton.

== List of current churches ==
- All Saints Church, Branksome
- Bible Baptist Church, Poole
- Broadstone Baptist Church
- Broadstone Methodist Church Centre
- Broadstone United Reformed Church
- Buckland Road Baptist Church
- Calvary Pentecostal Church
- Christ Church Creekmoor
- Church Of Scientology Mission Of Dorset
- Church of the Good Shepherd, Rossmore
- Dementia Friendly Church, Poole
- First Church of Christ, Scientist, Poole
- Gateway Church, Alder Road
- Gateway Church, Ashley Road
- Gateway Church, Ringwood Road
- Grace Church Waterloo, Poole
- Harbour Church Poole, Poole
- Kingdom Seekers Church Poole
- Kings Church Poole
- Life Church, Poole
- Longfleet Baptist Church
- Our Lady of Fatima Church
- Parkstone Church
- Parkstone Baptist Church
- Parkstone Christadelphian Church
- Parkstone United Reformed Church
- Poole Christian Fellowship
- Poole Christian Spiritualist Church
- Poole Methodist Church
- Poole United Reformed Church, Skinner Street
- Poole Vineyard Church
- Quakers Religious Society of Friends, Poole
- Redeemed Christian Church of God Parkstone, Poole, 16 Commercial Rd, Poole BH14 0JW
- Rossmore Gospel Church
- Salvation Army Church, Poole
- Sandbanks St. Nicholas' Church
- St Aldhelm's Church, Poole
- St Anthony of Padua Roman Catholic Church, Broadstone
- St. Clement's Church, Parkstone
- Saint Dunstan's Church, Upton
- St Dunstan of Canterbury Orthodox Church
- St. Gabriels Church, Hamworthy Church
- St George's Church, Oakdale
- St James' Church, Poole
- St John's Church, Broadstone
- St. John's Church, Heatherlands Parkstone
- St. Joseph's and St. Walburga's Catholic Church
- St. Luke's Church, Parkstone
- St Mary's Church, Longfleet
- St Mary's Roman Catholic Church Poole
- St. Paul's Church, Canford Heath
- St. Peter's Church, Parkstone
- Sunnyhill Church
- The Beacon Church United Reformed, Canford Heath
- The Church of Jesus Christ of Latter-Day Saints
- The Church of the Holy Angels, Lilliput
- The Church Of The Transfiguration, Canford Cliffs and Sandbanks
- Upton Methodist Church
- Waters Edge Elim Church

== Former churches ==
- Longfleet United Reformed Church (closed December 2021)
- Salterns Road Methodist Church (closed 2005)

== Mausolea ==
- Packe family mausoleum
