= Joshua Mauger =

British Member of Parliament (1725–1788)

Joshua Mauger Esq.
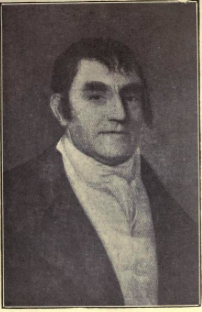
- Born: Joshua Mauger; 25 April 1725; St John, Jersey, Kingdom of Great Britain
- Died: 18 October 1788 (aged 63); Warborne, England, Kingdom of Great Britain
- Occupations: Merchant; Politician
- Parents: José Mauger (father); Sarah Le Couteur (mother)

Joshua Mauger (April 1725 – 18 October 1788) was a prominent merchant and slave trader in Halifax, Nova Scotia (1749–60) and then went to England and became Nova Scotia's colonial agent (1762). He has been referred to as "the first great merchant and shipowner" in Halifax. He was a member of St. Matthew's United Church (Halifax). Along with prominent merchant Captain Ephraim Cook (mariner), Mauger pushed Governor Lawrence for an elected assembly (1757).

== Life ==
Joshua Mauger, born in the early 18th century in Jersey, had his baptism on 25 April 1725. He was the son of José Mauger and Sarah Le Couteur. He went to sea with his uncle, Matthew Mauger, whose daughter he'd marry and have a daughter with.

He eventually became master of his own ship. Initially, Joshua Mauger conducted business in Louisburg, Nova Scotia, but after the French regained control in 1749, he shifted his operations to Halifax. In Halifax, he was active as a merchant, trading fish and lumber to the West Indies in exchange for rum, molasses, and sugar. By 1751, he served as an agent victualler to the British navy at Halifax. On 15 May 1752, an advertisement appeared in the Halifax Gazette stating, "Just imported, and to be sold by Joshua Mauger, at Major Lockman's store in Halifax, several Negro slaves, as follows: A women aged thirty-five, two boys aged twelve and thirteen respectively, two of eighteen and a man aged thirty."

In 1754, Mauger established shops at Pisiguit, Windsor, New Minas, Horton, and other places where he traded goods and spirits to the French and Native peoples. The merchant and shipowner, along with John Fillis, constructed the earliest rum distilleries in Nova Scotia. In Halifax, he ran a distillery that manufactured rum, which was then distributed to the army and navy. His distillery was located between the Royal Naval Dockyard and the grounds of the Halifax Naval Hospital. Mauger encountered some difficulties with Governor Edward Cornwallis regarding illicit dealing. Mauger, the agent victualler, was accused by the government of secretly turning Halifax into a storage point for Louisburg goods while illicitly trading. The Governor ordered a search of Mauger's stores for contraband from Louisburg.

Around 1761, after returning to England, the merchant served as the Nova Scotia Assembly's agent in London, only to resign the following year when he secured a parliamentary seat in Britain.

In 1764, Captain Francis Peabody set up the township known as Maugerville in Sunbury County, Nova Scotia, after 1784 the Province of New Brunswick, where he established a community of about 400 English settlers, mostly colonists from Massachusetts. Through the efforts of Joshua Mauger, who had influence and great interest in the new county formed on the banks of the Saint John River, the area was secured for the earlier settlers. He was the first name listed among the land grantees.

Mauger served as a Member of parliament and was twice elected for Poole in 1768 and 1774. In 1769, he was appointed as a Director of the French Hospital.

== Death ==
Joshua Mauger died on 18 October 1788.

== Legacy ==
Maugerville, New Brunswick (q.v.) is named for him. He is the namesake of Mauger Beach (later known as "Hangman's Beach") on McNabs Island. The beach on McNab's Island was initially owned by Mauger, as he owned large amounts of land.

== See also ==
- List of MPs elected in the British general election, 1768

Parliament of Great Britain
Preceded by Joseph Gulston; Thomas Calcraft	Member of Parliament for 1768–1780; With: Thomas Calcraft; Sir Eyre Coote	Succeeded by Joseph Gulston; William Morton Pitt
