= Gulston =

Gulston is a surname. Notable people with the surname include:

- Francis Gulston (1845-1917), English rower
- Joseph Gulston (disambiguation), three persons of that name
- Theodore Goulston or Gulston (1572–1632), English physician and scholar
- William Gulston (1636-1684), Bishop of Bristol
