= 84th Regiment of Foot (disambiguation) =

84th Regiment of Foot refers to one of three infantry regiments that served in the British Empire:

- 84th Regiment of Foot (1759) (1759–1765), served entirely in India, no successors
- 84th Regiment of Foot (Royal Highland Emigrants) (1775–1784), served in the American Revolution
- 84th (York and Lancaster) Regiment of Foot (1793–1881), served in the Napoleonic Wars and in India, incorporated into York and Lancaster Regiment
