= Joseph Gulston =

Joseph Gulston may refer to:

- Joseph Gulston (chaplain) (1603–1669), chaplain and almoner to Charles I of England. Also precentor and Dean of Chichester (1663-1669)
- Joseph Gulston (politician) (1674–1766), first cousin of the above, merchant and Member of Parliament for Poole
- Joseph Gulston (collector) (1745–1786), son of the above, collector and connoisseur and MP for Poole
