= Poole Town =

Poole Town may refer to:

- Poole Town Ward, an electoral ward within the Borough of Poole
- Poole Town F.C., a seventh-tier English football team
- Poole Town Centre
- Poole Town Hall
