= Ealing Grove =

Coordinates: 51°30′43″N 0°18′12″W

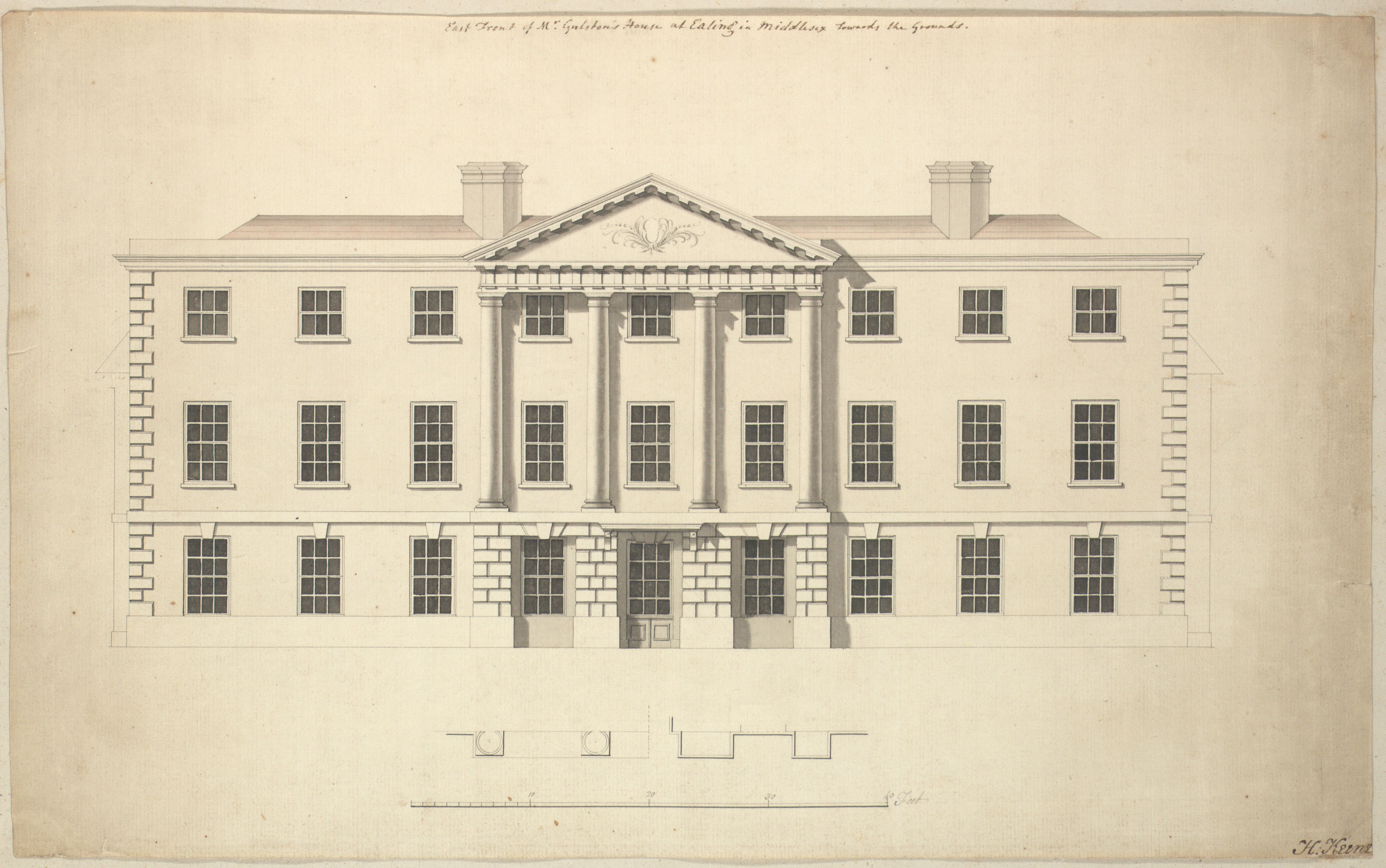
Architectural drawing for Ealing Grove, Henry Keene, third quarter of the 18th century

Ealing Grove was a mansion and estate in Ealing, Middlesex, west London, England. It was adjacent to the Ealing House estate, but distinct from it, and stood amongst trees.

The house was converted into an Italianate villa by the younger Joseph Gulston in the 1770s. It was demolished circa 1850.

== Owners and tenants ==
- From 1608, Sir William Fleetwood as tenant
- John Maynard as tenant
- 1657 Joseph and Sarah Wadlowe acquired it from Sir Thomas Soame and his son Stephen
- 1675 acquired by Robert Welstead
- Richard Savage, 4th Earl Rivers to 1712
- Bessy, wife of Frederick Nassau de Zuylestein, 3rd Earl of Rochford, owner in 1722
- Richard Savage Nassau, who sold it in 1746
- 1750 Mary Swift and Amy Peters
- 1754 Capt Edward Hughes
- 1755–1766 Joseph Gulston, snr, M.P. for Poole (bought and occupied)
- 1766–1775 Joseph Gulston, jnr, M.P. for Poole (inherited and occupied)
- 1775 George Spencer, 4th Duke of Marlborough (bought for £12,000)
- John Campbell, 5th Duke of Argyll
- 1791 James Baillie (died 1793).
- Colina Baillie, his wife
- Alexander Baillie, their son.
- 1799–1802 Edward Harley, 5th Earl of Oxford as tenant
- 1805 Charles Wyatt (to at least 1845).
- c.1850 House demolished
