= Poole Guildhall =

Municipal building in Poole, Dorset, England

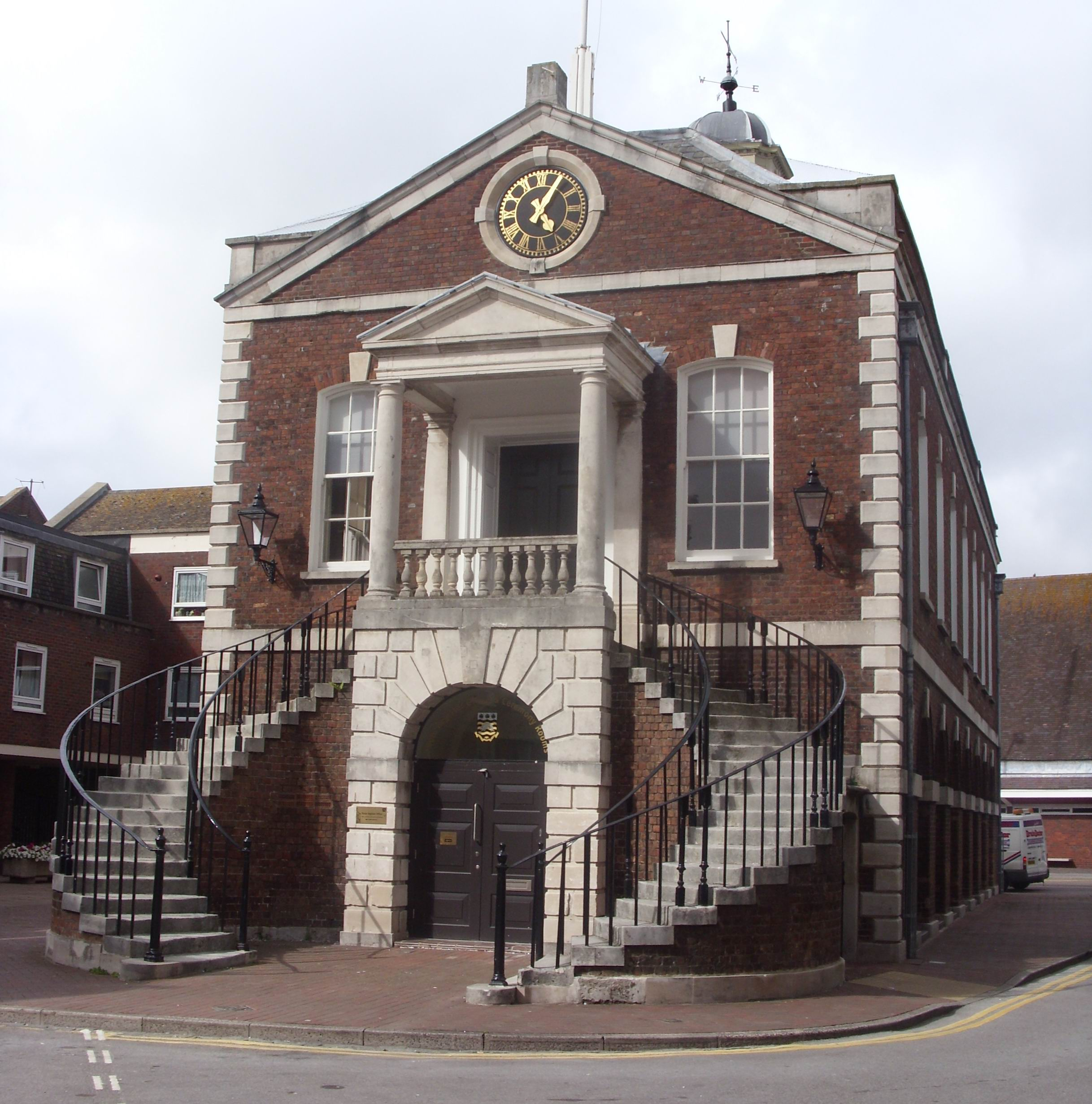
- Poole Guildhall

- Shown in Dorset
- 50.7147°N 1.9872°W
- Location: Market Street, Poole

History
- Built: 1761

Site notes
- Architectural style: Georgian style

Listed Building – Grade II*
- Official name: The Guildhall
- Designated: 14 June 1954
- Reference no.: 1266739

Poole Guildhall is a municipal building in Market Street, Poole, Dorset, England. The guildhall, which is used as a register office and a venue for weddings and civil partnership ceremonies, is a Grade II* listed building.

== History ==
The guildhall was commissioned at a time when Poole prospered from the cross-Atlantic and Mediterranean trade routes. Ships would sail from Poole to Newfoundland loaded with salt and provisions; they then transported fish from Newfoundland to Spain, Portugal and Italy and returned to Poole laden with wine, olive oil, dried fruits, and salt. The building was funded by public subscription with much of the funding donated by two local members of parliament, Joseph Gulston and Thomas Calcraft. The building was designed in the Georgian style, built in red brick with stone dressings at a cost of £2,250 and was completed in 1761.

The design involved a symmetrical main frontage with three bays facing southwest down Market Street; the central bay, featured a projecting two storey structure consisting of a rusticated base which supported a portico with Tuscan order columns and a pediment accessed by fine curved staircases on either side. The outer bays were fenestrated by segmental sash windows with keystones on the first floor and the whole elevation was surmounted by a pediment with a clock in the tympanum and a sundial at the apex of the pediment. The side elevations were arcaded so that meat markets could be held with seven openings on the ground floor and the same number of segmental sash windows with keystones on the first floor. At roof level, there was a central cupola and weather vane. Internally, the principal room was the council chamber on the first floor.

The guildhall was consecrated and used as the local parish church while the old St. James Church was being rebuilt in the Georgian style between 1819 and 1821. It became the meeting place of the municipal borough of Poole when it was formed in 1836 and continued to serve as a court of record, magistrates' court, Court of Admiralty and a venue for Quarter Sessions for much of the 19th century. It was outside the guildhall that, in 1886, a local man, John King, murdered a councillor, Horatio Hamilton, who had advised him that, unless he found the funds to purchase a boat, his licence as a harbour pilot would be withdrawn.

The building continued to serve as the headquarters of the borough council until the council moved to Poole Civic Centre at the junction between Parkstone Road and Sandbanks Road in May 1932. During the Second World War, the guildhall was used as a canteen and meeting room for American troops preparing to take part in the invasion of France. The showers and washing facilities installed at that time were later converted into public baths which were used until the 1960s.

Poole Museum, which had previously been based in Lagland Street, relocated to the guildhall in 1971 and remained on the first floor of the building until moving to new premises in the Lower High Street area in 1989. After some 16 years of disuse and increasing dilapidation, an extensive programme of refurbishment works was carried out to a design by HGP Conservation in the early 21st century. The works, which cost of £800,000, involved the conversion of the building for use as a register office and a venue for weddings and civil partnership ceremonies. It was officially re-opened by the Princess Royal in October 2007.

== See also ==
- Grade II* listed buildings in Poole (borough)
