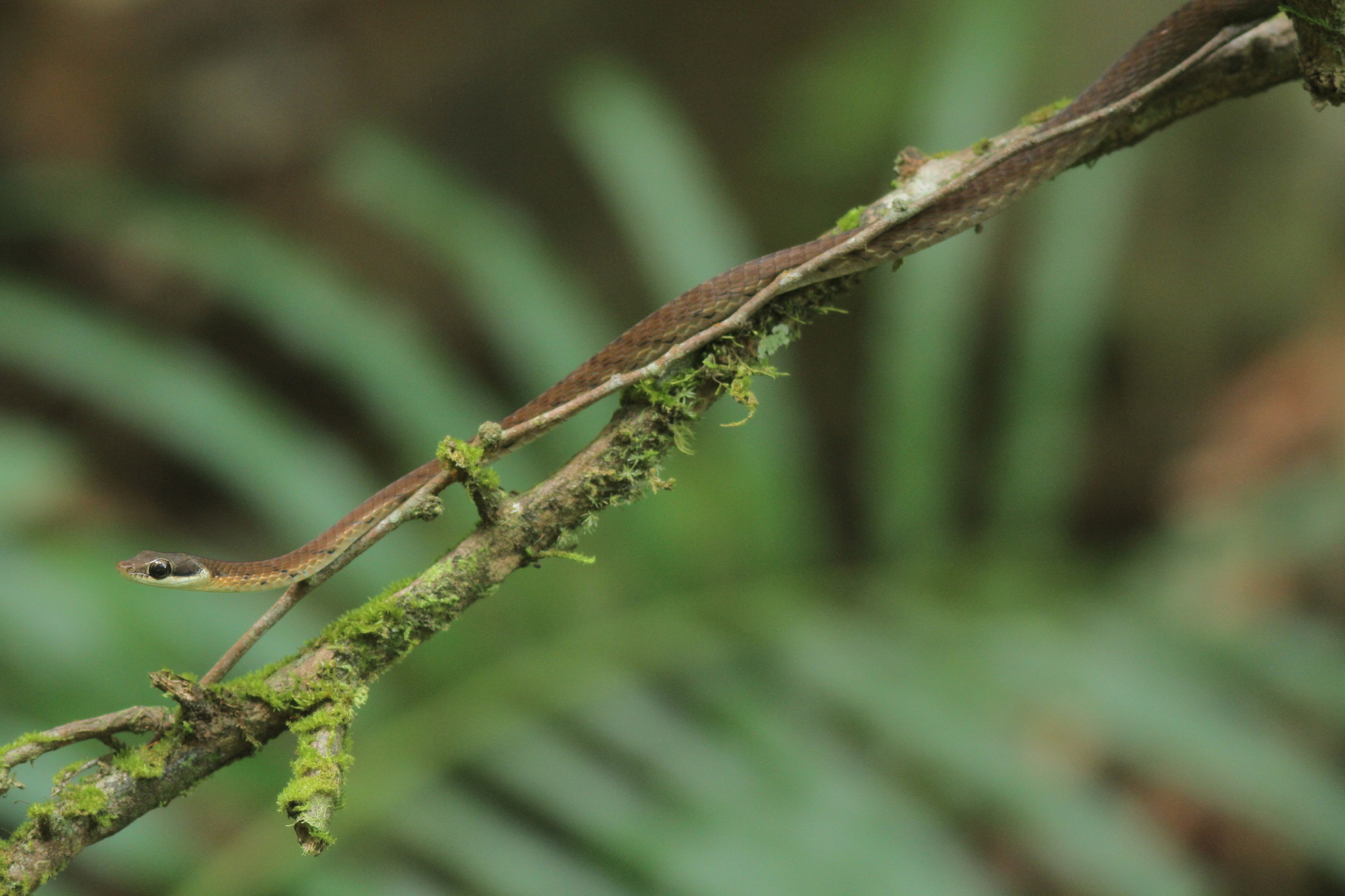

Conservation status
- Vulnerable (IUCN 3.1)

Scientific classification
- Kingdom: Animalia
- Phylum: Chordata
- Class: Reptilia
- Order: Squamata
- Suborder: Serpentes
- Family: Colubridae
- Subfamily: Ahaetuliinae
- Genus: Dendrelaphis
- Species: D. caudolineolatus

Binomial name
- Dendrelaphis caudolineolatus (Günther, 1869)

Synonyms
- Dendrophis caudolineolatus Günther, 1869; Dendrophis gregorii Haly, 1888

= Dendrelaphis caudolineolatus =

Species of snake

Dendrelaphis caudolineolatus, commonly known as Gunther's bronzeback tree snake, is a species of snake of the family Colubridae.

It was described and named, as Dendrophis caudolineolata, by Albert Günther of the British Museum in 1869.

== Geographic range ==
The snake is found in Sri Lanka, where the type specimen, now in the Natural History Museum, London, was collected by Richard Hawksworth Barnes.
