= John Darker =

British merchant and politician

John Darker (c. 1722 – 8 February 1784) was a British merchant and politician who sat in the House of Commons between 1776 and 1784.

Darker was the son of John Darker and was born at Stoughton, Leicestershire. His father was in business as a hop-merchant in Clerkenwell by 1749. Darker himself joined the firm shortly afterwards and succeeded his father in 1759. He remained in business until about 1773 and built up a fortune, acquiring property in Gayton, Northamptonshire and Leicestershire. In 1760 he was appointed Treasurer of St Bartholomew's Hospital. He married Mary Parker, daughter of John Parker of Retford, Nottinghamshire.

In 1766 Darker was elected Member of Parliament for Leicester on the corporation interest at a contested by-election. In the 1768 general election he stood again at Leicester as a corporation candidate, but was defeated in a fierce contest.

He became a Fellow of the Royal Society on 5 May 1768. having become a Fellow of the Society of Antiquaries of London in 1766.

In the 1774 general election he was returned unopposed for Leicester on a compromise between the corporation and the independent interest. He was unopposed again in 1780. Although he is only recorded as having spoken only once in the House, he was very active in all parliamentary committees relating to trade and commerce.

Darker died on 8 February 1784 and was buried in the church of St Bartholomew-the-Less. He left two daughters, Sarah Johanna who married Sir George Shuckburgh, Bt MP and Elizabeth who married firstly Joseph Nash of London, and secondly Edward Loveden Loveden MP.

Parliament of Great Britain
Preceded by George Wrighte; Anthony James Keck	Member of Parliament for Leicester; 1766–1768; With: Anthony James Keck	Succeeded by Booth Grey; Eyre Coote
Preceded by Booth Grey; Eyre Coote	Member of Parliament for Leicester; 1774–1784; With: Booth Grey	Succeeded by Booth Grey; Shukburgh Ashby
