= Kinges Halle =

Historic building in Poole, Dorset

Coordinates: 50°42′45″N 1°59′22″W

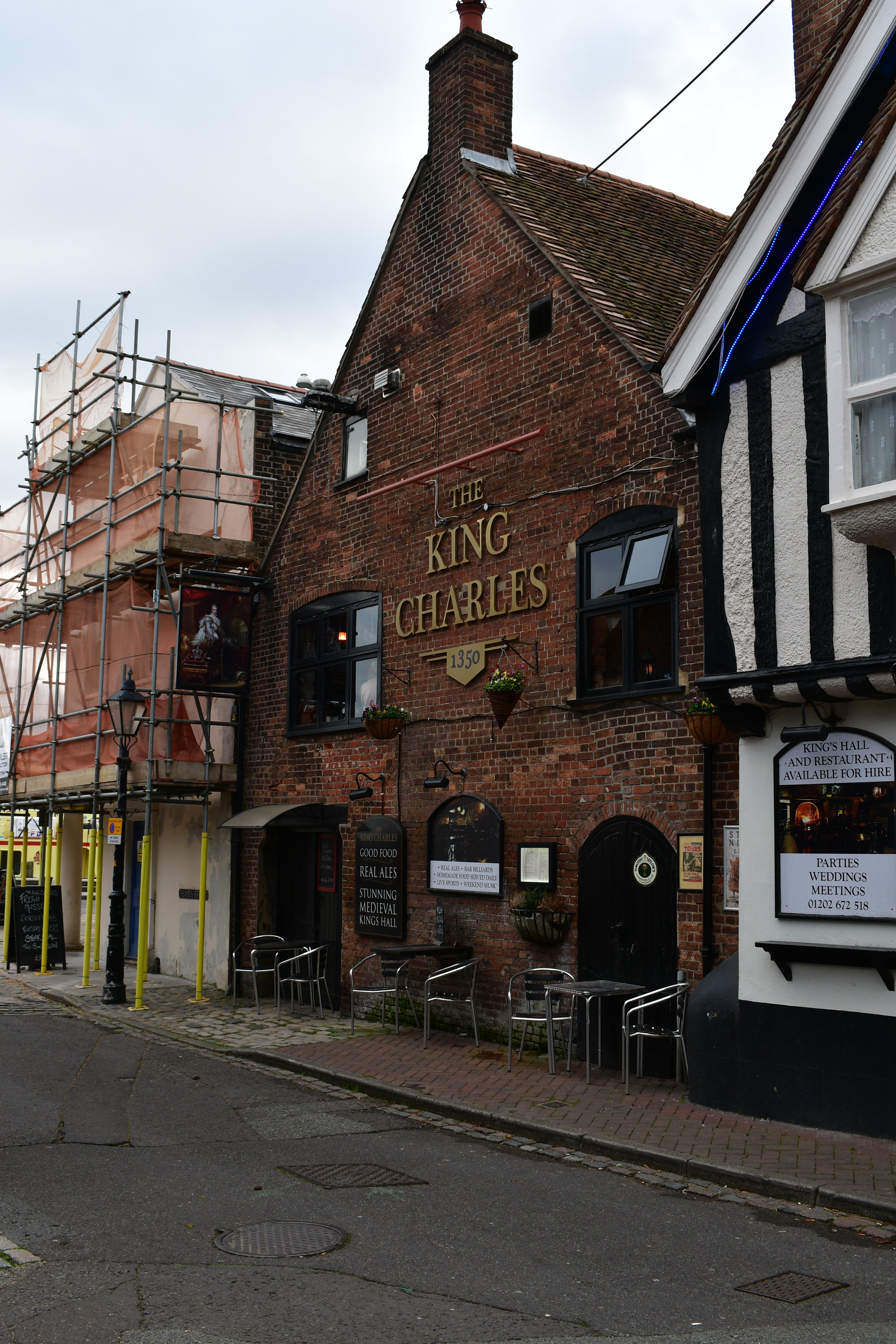
The building in 2021.

Kinges Halle is a historic building in Poole, Dorset.

== History ==
Formerly known as Wool House, Kinges Halle dates to the 15th century. It was once attached to Poole Museum. It was used as a warehouse and later as dwellings. It is now the King Charles Public House. It was renamed after Charles X of France in 1830 when he landed at Poole Quay while fleeing after the Second French Revolution.

On 14 June 1954 it was made a Grade II* listed building.

== Gallery ==
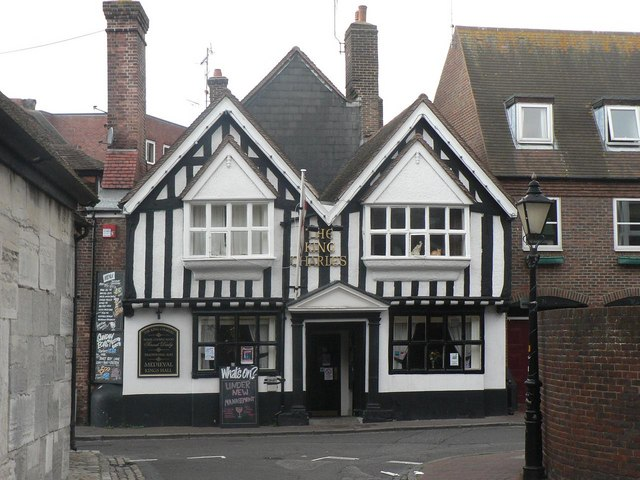
Front view

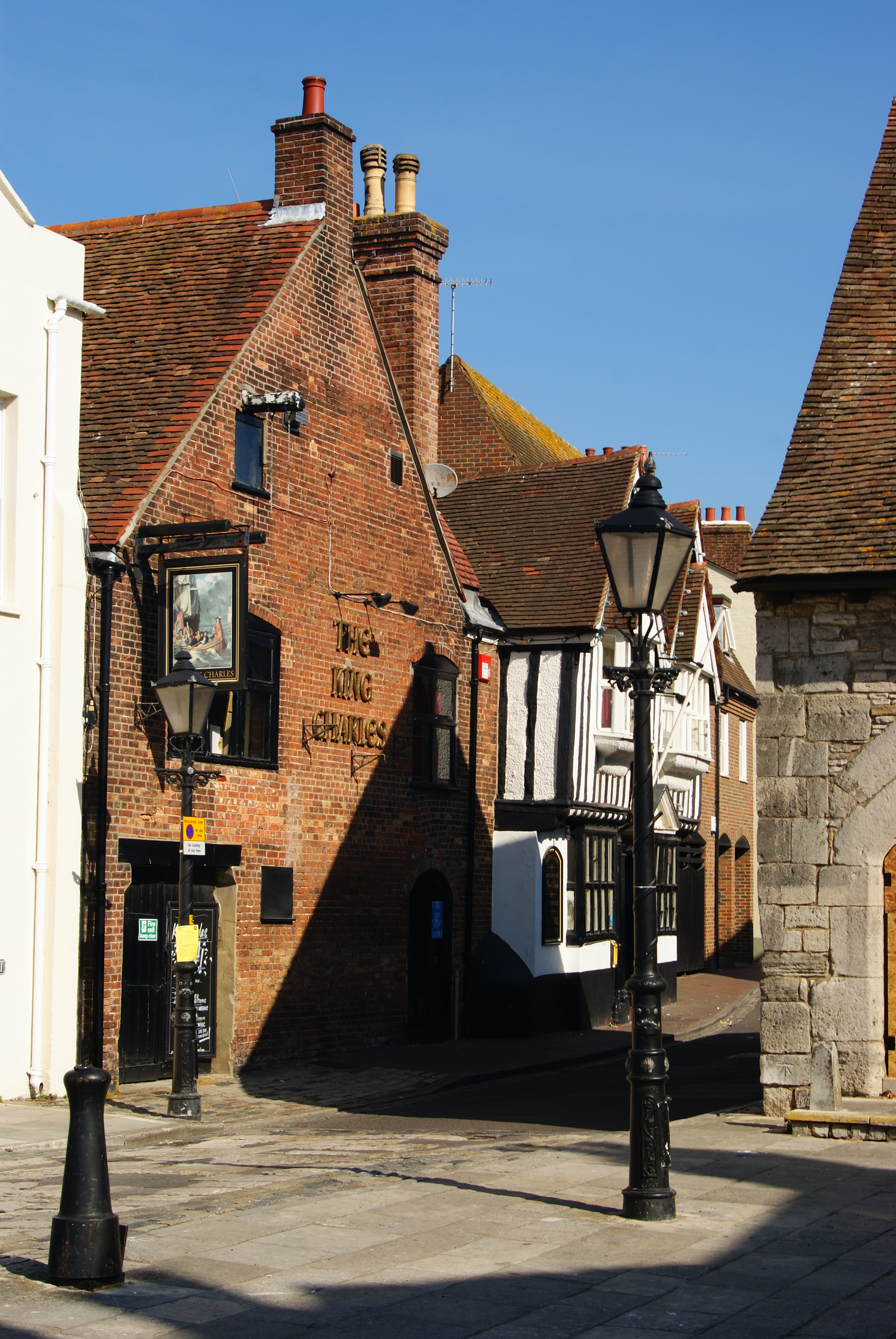
Side view

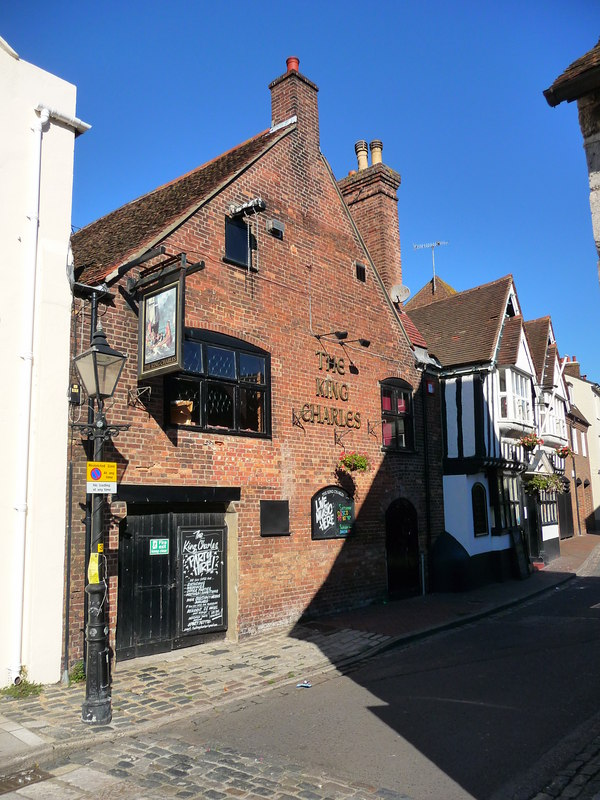
Side view

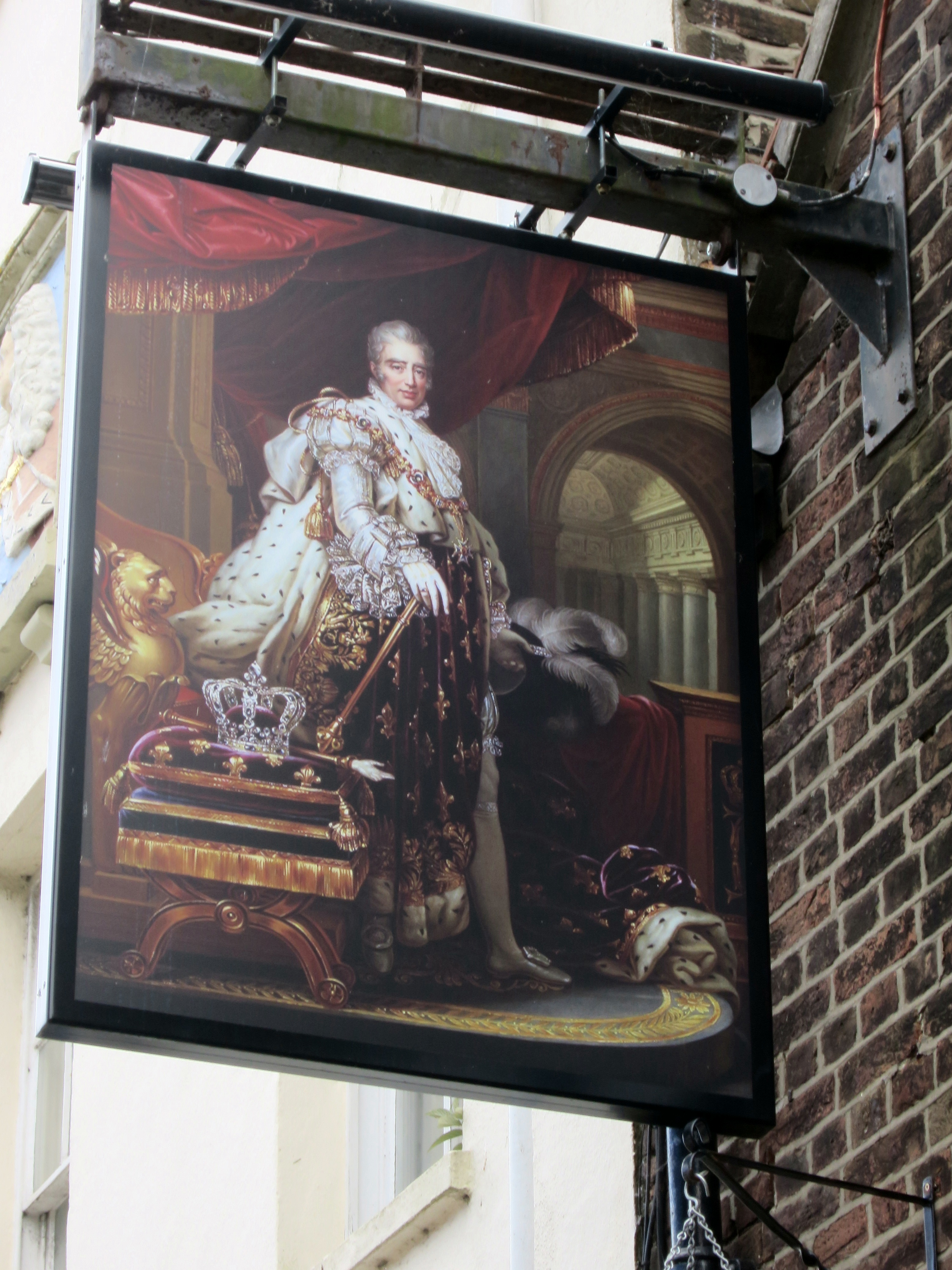
Pub sign

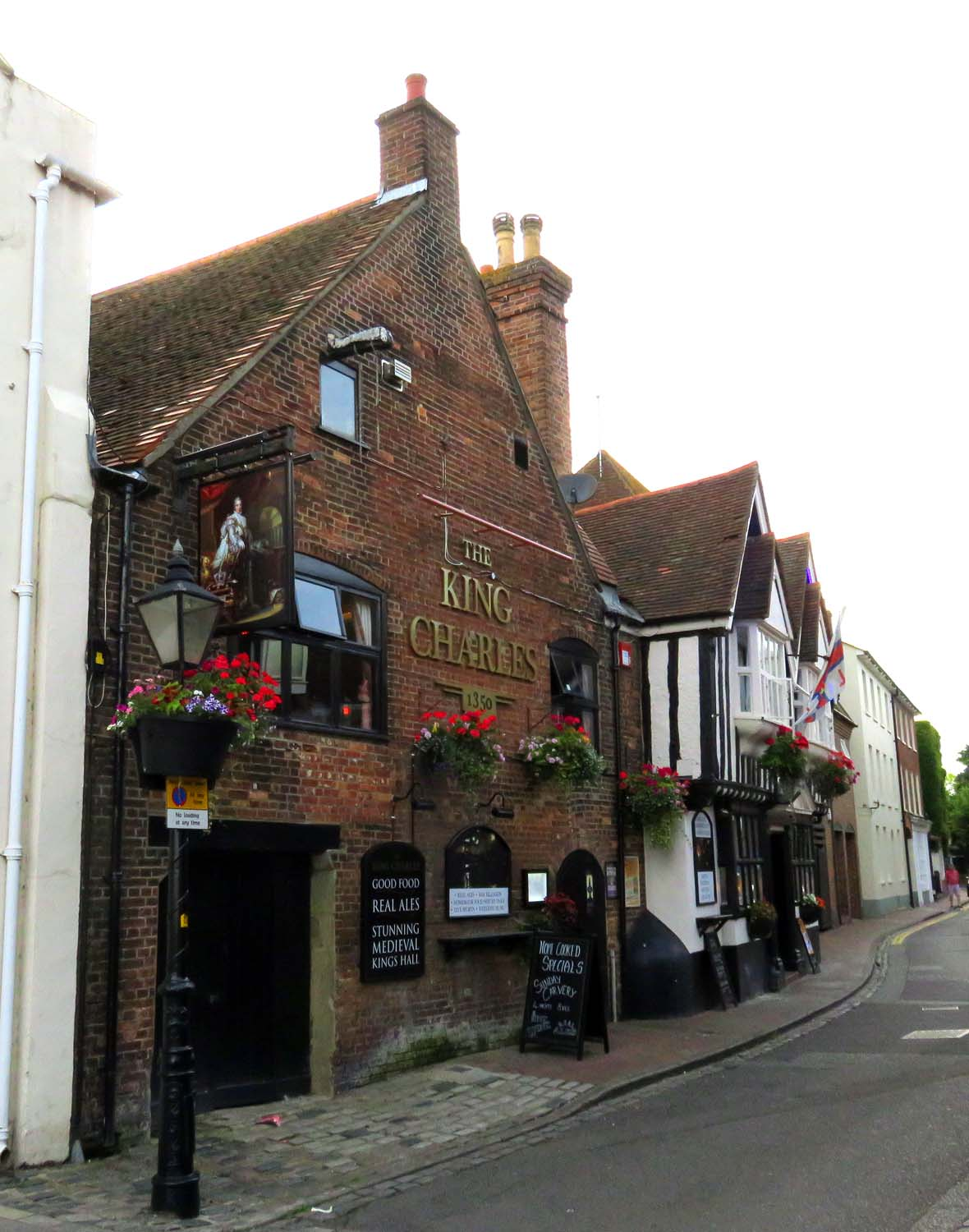
From quay

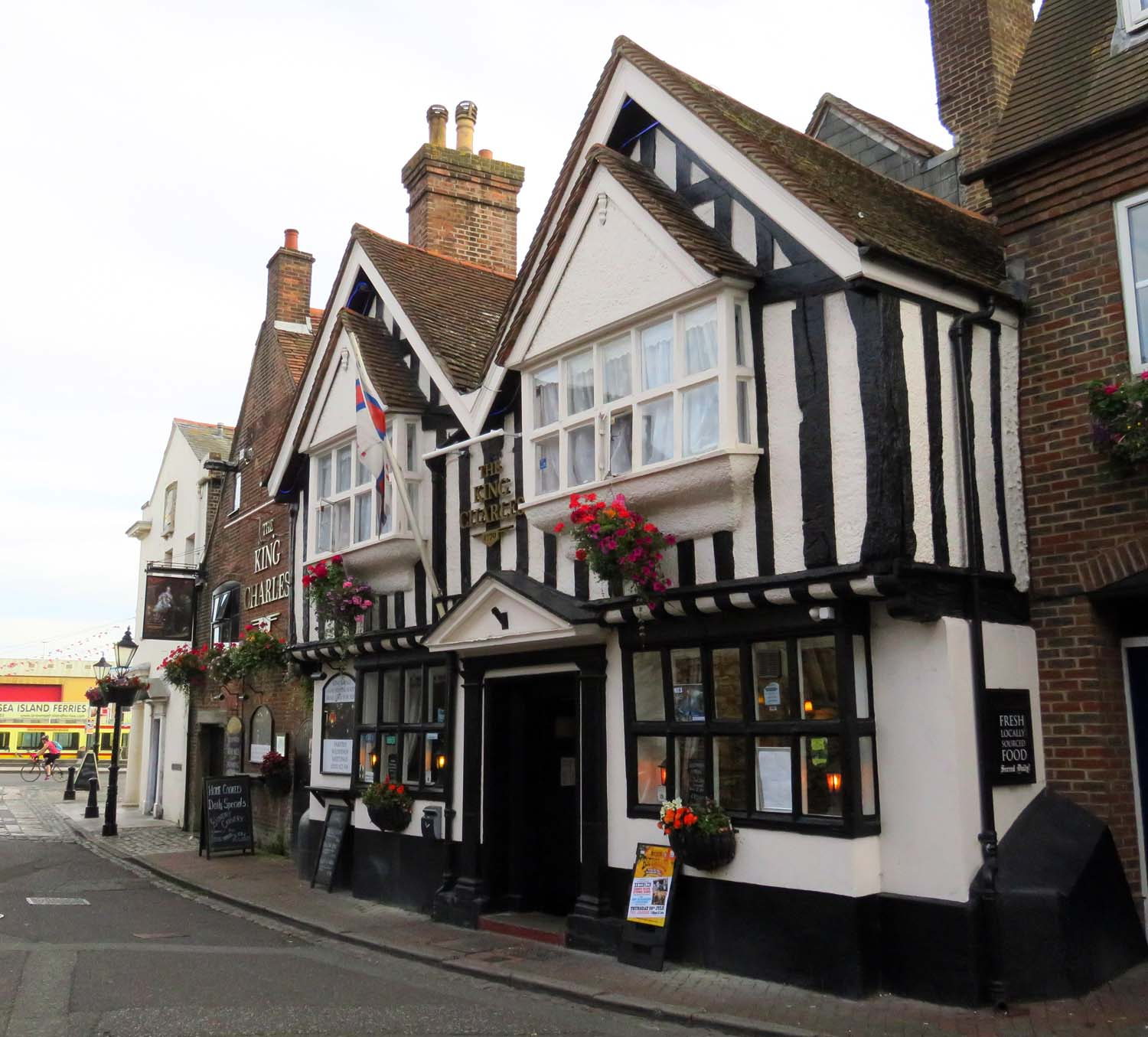
From Thames Street

== See also ==
- Grade II* listed buildings in Poole (borough)
