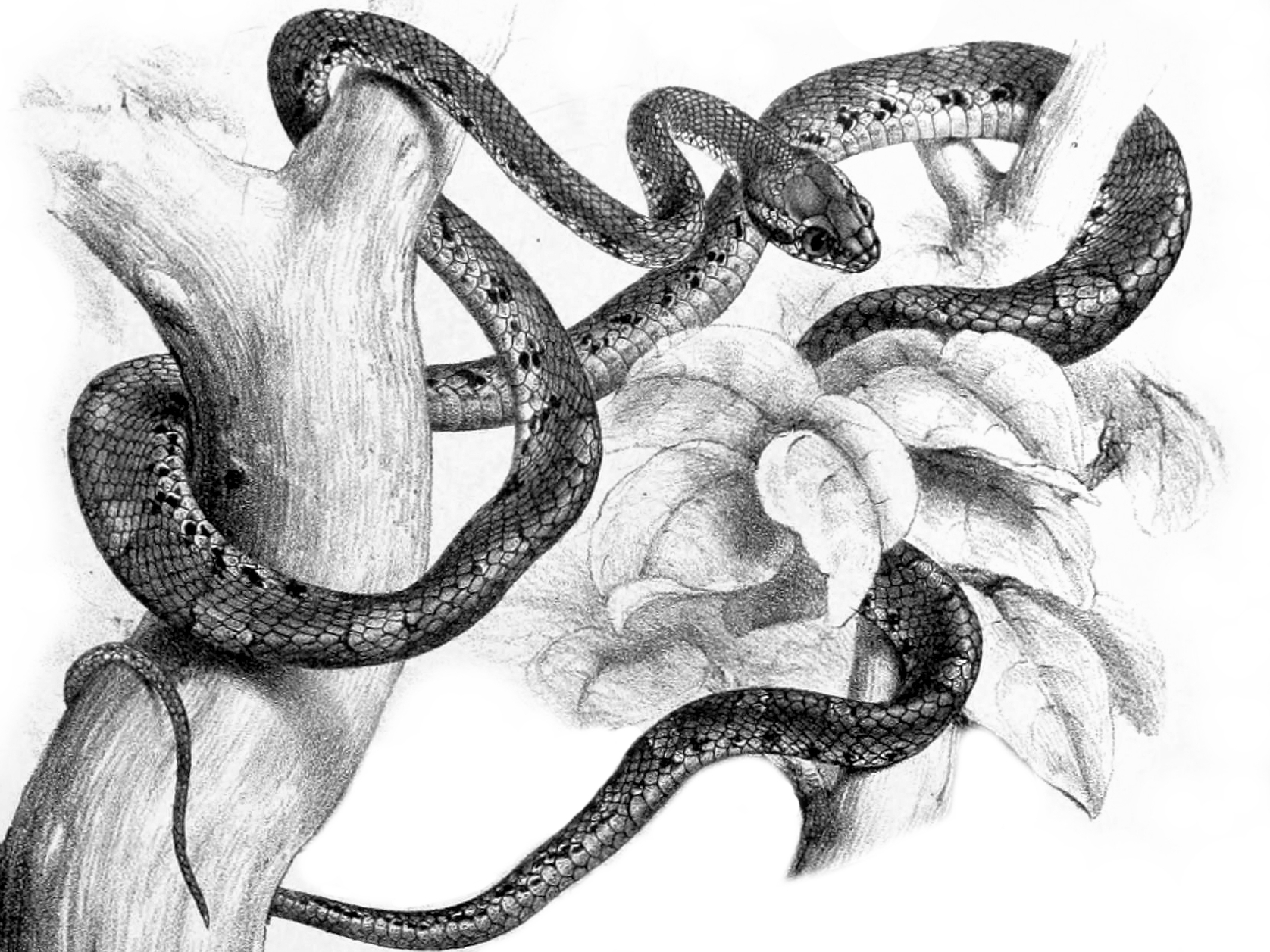

Conservation status
- Vulnerable (IUCN 3.1)

Scientific classification
- Kingdom: Animalia
- Phylum: Chordata
- Class: Reptilia
- Order: Squamata
- Suborder: Serpentes
- Family: Colubridae
- Genus: Boiga
- Species: B. barnesii

Binomial name
- Boiga barnesii (Günther, 1869)

Synonyms
- Dipsas barnesii Günther, 1869; Dipsadomorphus barnesii — Boulenger, 1896; Boiga barnesii — M.A. Smith, 1943

= Boiga barnesii =

Species of snake

Boiga barnesii is a species of cat snake endemic to Sri Lanka. It is known as Barnes' cat snake in English and panduru mapila-පදුරු මාපිලා in Sinhala. It is a member of the snake family Colubridae. It is distributed in the lowlands and midlands up to approximately 600 m (2,000 ft) above sea level, with known localities include Matale, Kandy, Gannoruwa, Gampola, Ambagamuwa, Balangoda, Labugama and Sinharaja Rain Forest. Barnes' cat snake is mainly a forest-dwelling species but may occasionally be found in human habitats. It is the smallest cat snake in Sri Lanka and grows up to a maximum of about 600 mm (24 in) in snout-vent length. Being a nocturnal and an arboreal hunter, it mainly feeds on agamid lizards and geckos. The day time is usually spent inside a tree hole or a crevice. It's a very timid and a mildly venomous snake and rarely attempts to bite.

== Etymology ==
The specific name, barnesii, is in honour of Richard Hawksworth Barnes (1831-1904), who collected specimens in Ceylon (now Sri Lanka) for the British Museum (Natural History), including the type specimen of this species.

== Scalation ==
B. barnesii has 19 scale rows at midbody. It has 2–3 preoculars. The ventrals number 208–271, and the subcaudals number 98–120.

== Description ==
The dorsum of B. barnesii is reddish-brown, with a purplish brown vertebral series of blotches running from nape to the mid-tail region. A lateral series of the same color also can be seen. The head is purplish black, with a light gray post-ocular stripe. The ventral surface is creamy, with gray or brown spots.

The maximum length recorded is 522 mm (20.6 in).

== Toxicity ==
Although panduru mapila is only mildly venomous, and bites on humans produce only local symptoms, there is a common misconception in Sri Lanka that all mapilas-මාපිලා (cat snakes) are highly venomous and could kill a human with its venom. This misconception may be because the name mapila refers to different species in different parts of the island. Due to differences in local knowledge and nomenclature, the krait species found in Sri Lanka (common krait or thel karawala-තෙල් කරවලා, Ceylon krait or mudu karawala-මුදු කරවලා) are also referred to or misidentified as mapila. Both krait species mentioned (Bungarus caeruleus and Bungarus ceylonicus) are highly venomous.

== See also ==
- Boiga ceylonensis (Sri Lanka Cat Snake)
