= Salterns Road Methodist Church =

Church in Poole, Dorset, England

- Eagle School of English
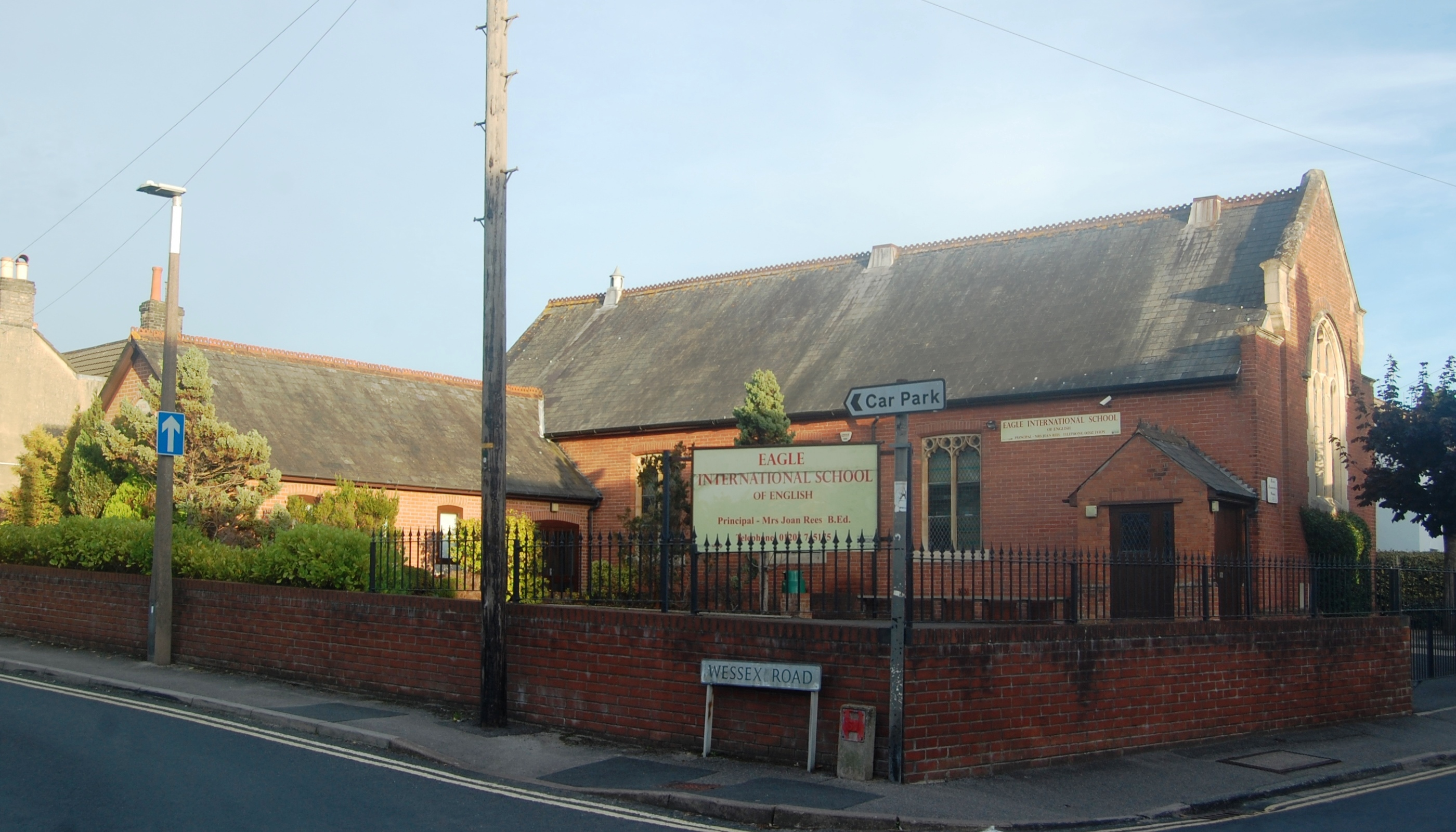
- Salterns Road Methodist Church in 2022

Religion
- Affiliation: Methodism
- Ecclesiastical or organizational status: defunct

Location
- Location: Salterns Road, Parkstone, Poole, Dorset, England
- Interactive map of Salterns Road Methodist Church
- Coordinates: 50.72253°N 1.9537°W

Architecture
- Type: Church
- Style: Victorian
- Completed: 1865

The Salterns Road Methodist Church is a historic building in the Parkstone area of Poole, Dorset, England.

== History ==
The former Wesleyan Methodist chapel was first named on a map in the 19th century. A foundation stone is dated 1865. The church closed in 2005. The building is now used by the Eagle School of English.

== See also ==
- List of churches in Poole
