= Booth Grey =

English politician

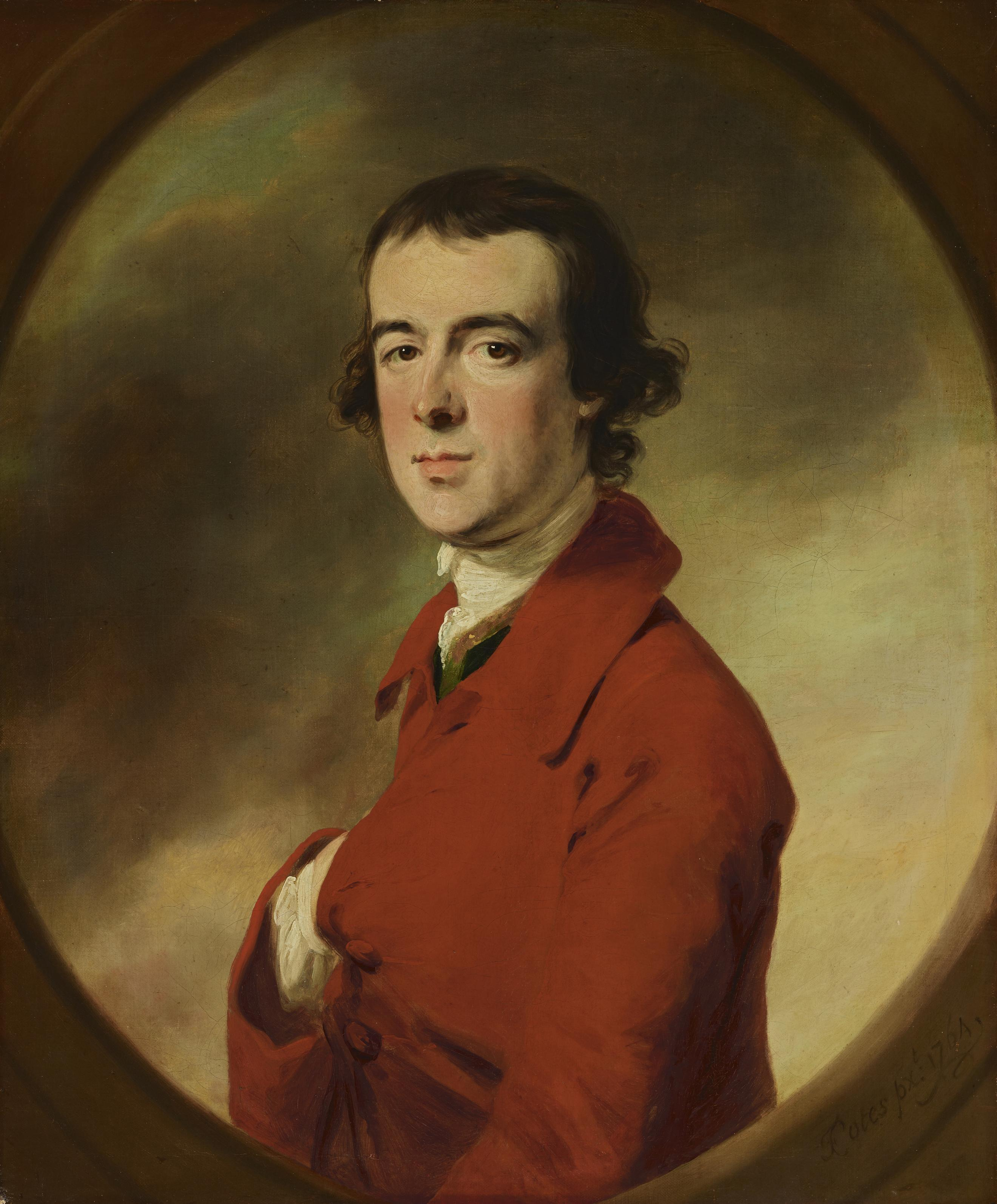
The Hon. Booth Grey, Francis Cotes, 1764

Booth Grey (15 August 1740 – 4 March 1802) was an English politician who served in the House of Commons from 1768 to 1784.

Grey was the son of Harry Grey, 4th Earl of Stamford, and his wife Lady Mary Booth daughter of George Booth, 2nd Earl of Warrington. He matriculated at Queens' College, Cambridge in 1756 and was awarded MA in 1761. He was one of the founders of the Tarporley Hunt Club in 1762. He was elected Member of Parliament for Leicester in the 1768 general election on a joint interest with his friend Eyre Coote. He was returned without contest in 1774 and 1780. In 1784 Grey canvassed the borough, but withdrew when faced with the prospect of an expensive contest and never stood for Parliament again.

Grey married Elizabeth Manwaring, daughter of Charles Manwaring of Brombrough, Cheshire and had a son also Booth and a daughter Elizabeth. He died on 4 March 1802.

Parliament of Great Britain
Preceded by John Darker; Anthony James Keck	Member of Parliament for Leicester; 1768–1784; With: Eyre Coote 1768-1774; John Darker 1774-1784; Shukburgh Ashby 1784	Succeeded by John Macnamara; Charles Loraine-Smith
