= Richard Hawksworth Barnes =

British zoological collector (1831–1904)

- Born: 1831; Colombo
- Died: 27 February 1904 (aged 72–73); Parkstone
- Resting place: St Peter's Church
- Alma mater: Eton College; University of Cambridge
- Occupation: Zoological collector, meteorologist, coffee grower, scientific collector
- Spouse(s): Cecilia Freckleton
- Parent(s): Edward Barnes
- Awards: Fellow of the Linnean Society of London

Richard Hawksworth Barnes FLS (1831–1904) was a British meteorologist and naturalist, who spent time working as a coffee grower in Ceylon (now Sri Lanka), where he collected specimens for the British Museum.

The snake species Boiga barnesii is named in his honour.

== Early life ==
Barnes was born in 1831 in Colombo, Ceylon, the youngest son of Maria, née Fawkes, daughter of Walter Fawkes, (Note: Walter Fawkes surname at birth was Hawksworth) and her husband, the then Governor of Ceylon, Edward Barnes. He spent many of his early years at the Fawkes' family seat, Farnley Hall, near Otley, Yorkshire. He was subsequently educated at Eton College and studied mathematics at Trinity College, Cambridge, taking the Mathematical Tripos and becoming 38th Wrangler (i.e. obtaining first class honours) in 1853.

== Career ==
In 1852, Barnes obtained a position as a "coffee planter" in Ceylon, where West-Indian style coffee cultivation had been introduced by his father in 1824. While there, he carried out the study of meteorology, botany and herpetology.

He was elected a Fellow of the Linnean Society of London in April 1863.

The Times noted:

In 1865 he was able to warn the Madras observatory by telegram that a severe cyclone would reach their coasts in three days, by which means all vessels there were enabled to reach safe waters, and many lives were saved.

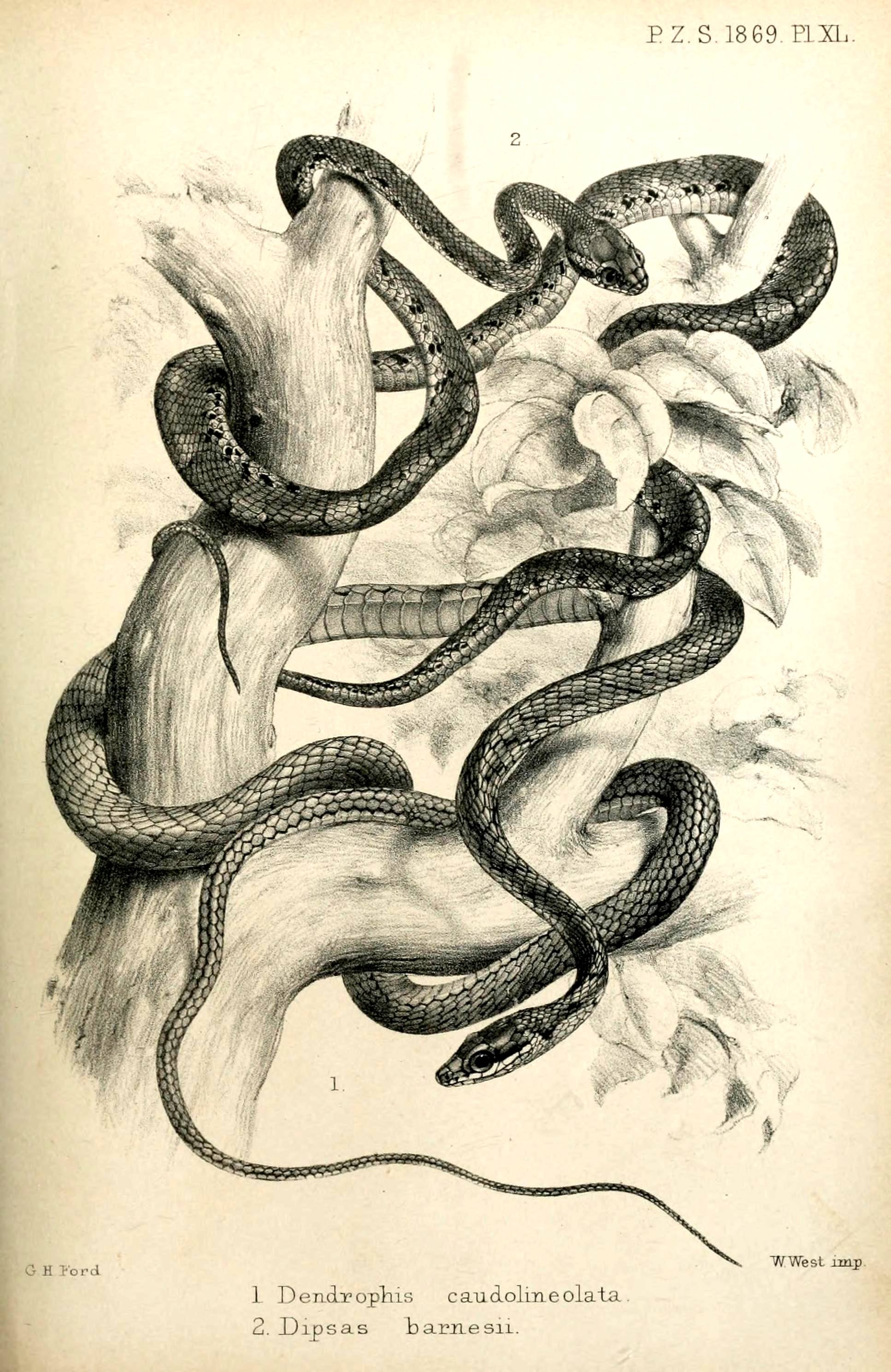
Plate from Günther's paper describing Dendrophis caudolineolata and Dipsas barnesii, illustrated by George Henry Ford from type specimens supplied by Barnes

He collected specimens for the British Museum (these are now in the Natural History Museum, London).

Among the specimens he collected were the types of two species of snake, Dendrelaphis caudolineolatus (originally Dendrophis caudolineolata) and Boiga barnesii (also known as Barnes' cat snake). They were described, and the latter named (as Dipsas barnesii) in Barnes' honour, by Albert Günther in 1869.

== Personal life and death ==
On 29 November 1866 Barnes married Cecilia Freckleton (née Waring), a widow, becoming step-father to her daughter Alice Marie Freckleton. At that time his address was given as "Gannoruwa estate, Peradeniya". He returned to England in 1867 when his address was given as "40 Kensington Park Gardens, London W.". He later lived at Parkstone, Dorset, from where he contributed regular meteorological readings to his local newspaper, the Parkstone Reminder.

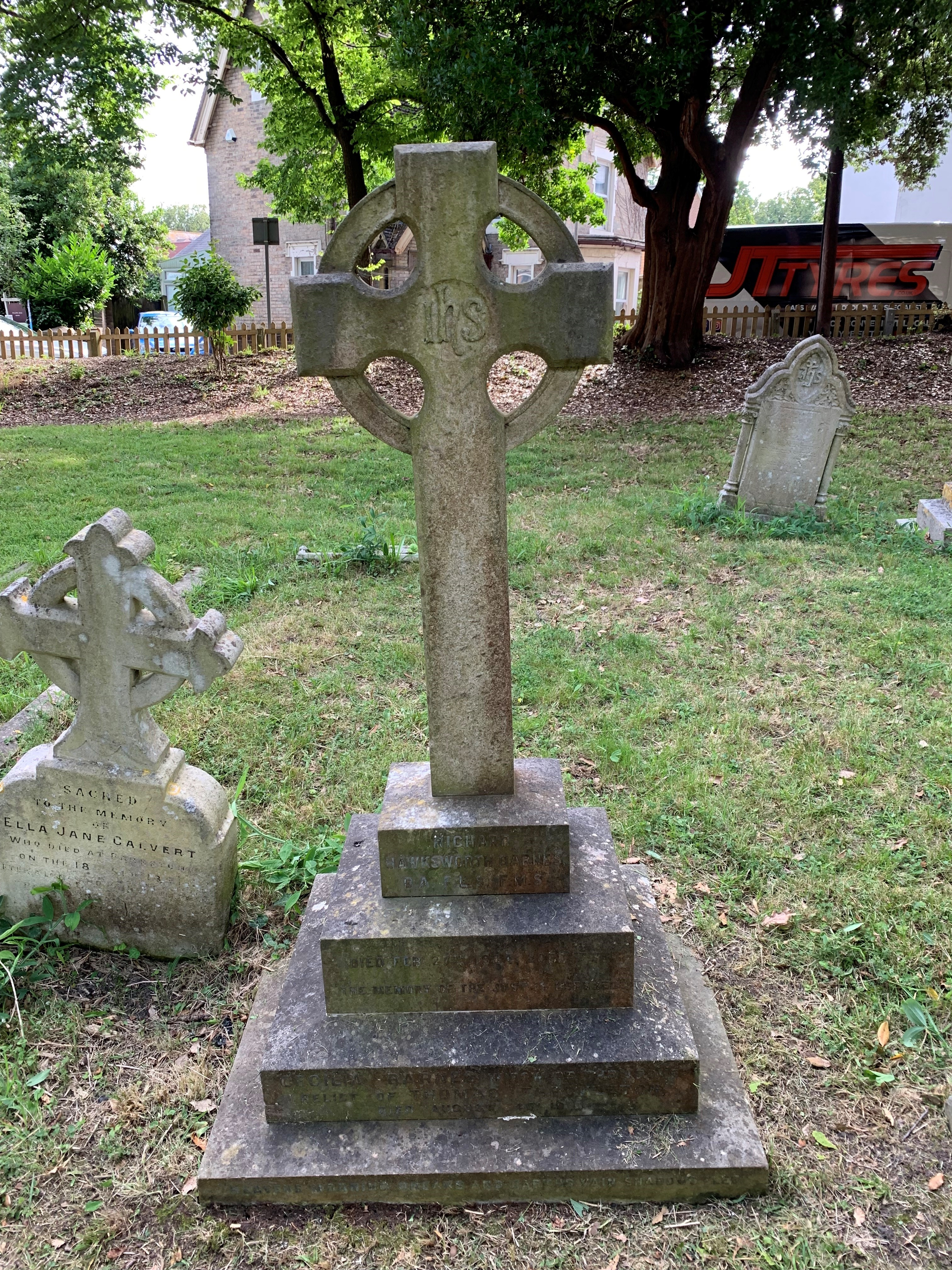
Barnes' gravestone at St Peter's, Parkstone

Barnes died at his home, Heatherland House, in Parkstone, on 27 February 1904, aged 73. Obituaries were published in The Times, Tropical Agriculturist, the Parkstone Reminder, and a number of other regional newspapers. He was buried at St Petert Peter's Church, the parish church of Parkstone. He was survived by Cecilia.
