= 84th Regiment of Foot (1758) =

British army regiment

- Active: 1758–1765
- Country: Kingdom of Great Britain
- Branch: British Army
- Type: Line Infantry
- Engagements: Second Carnatic War; Bengal War

Commanders
- Notable commanders: Sir Eyre Coote

The 84th Regiment of Foot was a British regiment raised for service in India with the British East India Company.

== History ==
Raised in England in 1758 during the Seven Years' War, the regiment was shipped to Madras, India in 1759. The regiment was among the first British regiments to serve in India. The regiment was soon in action in the Battle of Wandiwash in January 1760. This battle was followed in September by the Siege of Pondicherry and the Siege of Arcot during the Second Carnatic War. Sir Eyre Coote was a commanding officer of the regiment at that time. The regiment went on to fight at the Battle of Buxar in October 1764 during the Bengal War. In 1765 the regiment sailed back to Britain and were disbanded.
