= Poole Civic Centre =

Municipal building in Poole, Dorset, England

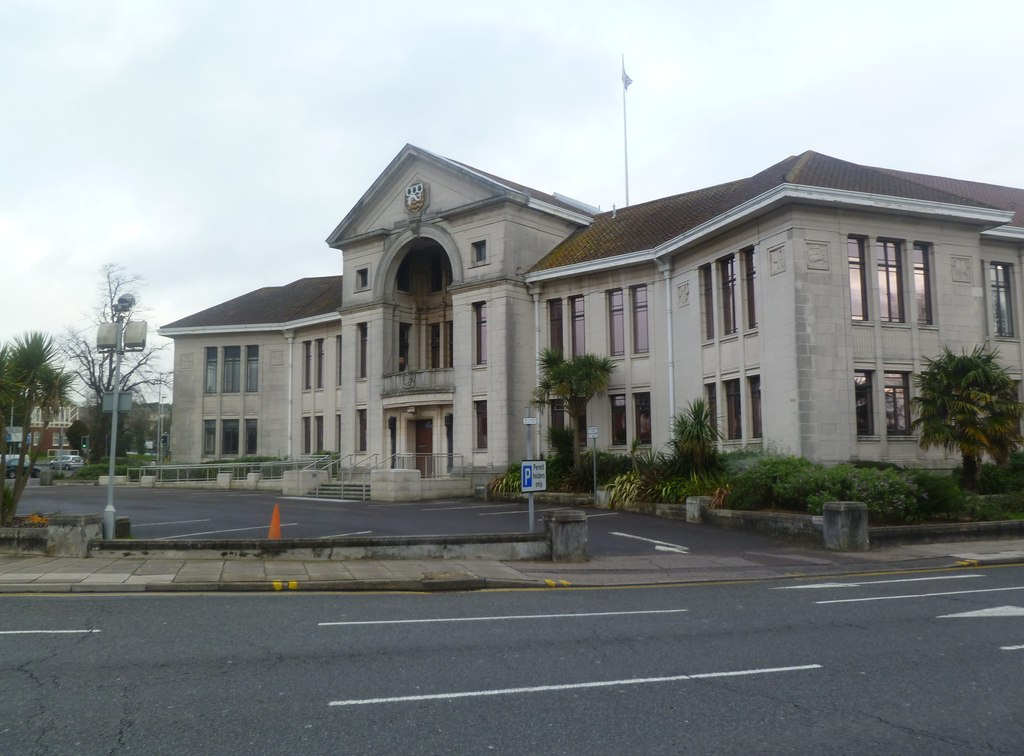
- Poole Civic Centre in 2011

- Shown in Dorset
- 50.7228°N 1.9624°W
- Location: Poole

History
- Built: 1932

Site notes
- Architect: L. Magnus Austin
- Architectural style: Art Deco style

Listed Building – Grade II
- Designated: 7 October 2019
- Reference no.: 1465200

Poole Civic Centre is an Art Deco municipal building in Poole, Dorset. Since 7 October 2019 the building has been a Grade II listed building. Also sometimes known as Poole Town Hall, the civic centre was the headquarters of Poole Borough Council until 2019.

== History ==
The first town hall in Poole was a structure in Market Street, now known as the Poole Guildhall, which was completed in 1761. After deciding that the guildhall was too cramped, civic leaders decided to procure a new civic centre: the site they selected was open land facing the junction between Parkstone Road and Sandbanks Road.

Foundation stones for the new building were laid by the Lord Mayor of London, Sir William Neal, and the mayor of Poole, Alderman John Arthur Rogers on 16 May 1931. It was designed in the Art Deco style by L. Magnus Austin, built by Whitelock and Co. of Branksome and was officially opened by the Earl of Shaftesbury on 28 May 1932. The design involved a symmetrical main frontage with nine bays with the end bays canted forwards; the central section of three bays featured a full-height archway with a doorway on the ground floor and a recess on the first and second floors containing a balcony on the first floor and windows on the first and second floors; there was an open pediment containing the borough coat of arms above the archway. Internally, the principal rooms were the council chamber, the mayor's parlour and the courtroom.

An extension to the rear, creating an enclosed courtyard, was added in the 1980s. The building remained the borough council's headquarters after Poole became a unitary authority in April 1997.

In 2016 proposals were considered which involved demolition of the building and redevelopment of the site for housing, but the plans were rejected. Instead civic leaders decided to improve the building and some £250,000 was spent on refurbishment, including disabled access, baby changing facilities and areas for customer interviews, later that year. The building ceased to be the local seat of government when Bournemouth, Christchurch and Poole Council, an enlarged unitary authority, was created in April 2019. It was reported in August 2020 that the new council intended to sell the building for redevelopment.

In 2023 it was reported the council intend to convert the building into a "150-room boutique hotel" with 360 new homes built on the rest of the site. In 2024, the Bournemouth, Christchurch and Poole Council cabinet voted in favour of the sale of the building. The new Member of Parliament for Poole Neil Duncan-Jordan called the proposal "public vandalism".

In July 2025, Bournemouth, Christchurch and Poole Council approved the sale of the site. In March 2026, it was reported that the buyers were a Manchester-based real estate investment and development company.

== Park and ride ==
The car park adjacent to the building was used as a mobile testing centre during the COVID-19 pandemic and, in 2021, it became a park and ride facility.
