= Bull's Head Inn, Poole =

Former pub in Poole, Dorset, England

Coordinates: 50.7143°N 1.9856°W

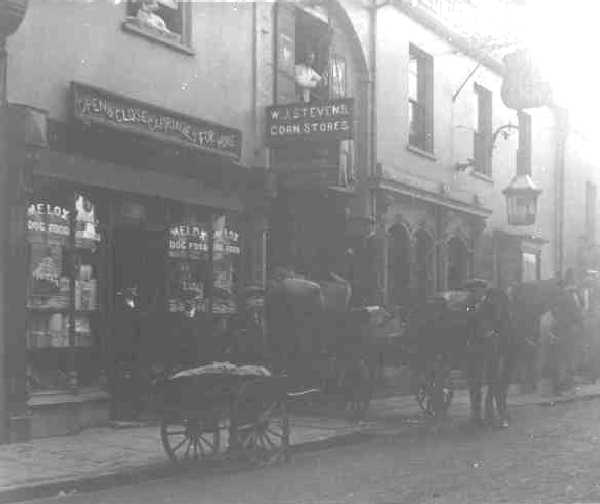
The Bull's Head Inn, which was located at 73–75 High Street

The Bull's Head Inn was a pub located at 73–75 High Street in Poole, Dorset, England. The building, now used by a recruitment agency, is the oldest building on central Poole High Street, and is a Grade II* listed building.

== History ==
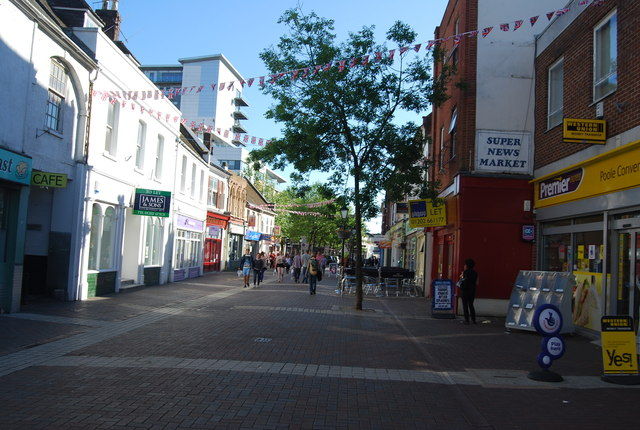
The present building is on the right (pictured in 2013)

73 High Street was built in the sixteenth century, and is the oldest building on central Poole High Street. It opened as the Bull's Head Inn. In the nineteenth century, the inn was used for accounts and returns of corn, as required by the Corn Laws. In 1864, the ownership of the pub was transferred from a deceased Mr George Wickham to his widow. The licence was later given to a Mr Beckingham in 1866.

The front of the building was remodelled in the nineteenth century, and a shop front added in the 1970s. In 1980, the building became a Grade II* listed building. The building was used by sandwich chain Subway until 2010, and 71–73 High Street is now used by a recruitment agency.
