= St Peter's Church, Parkstone =

Church in Poole, Dorset, England

St Peter's Church
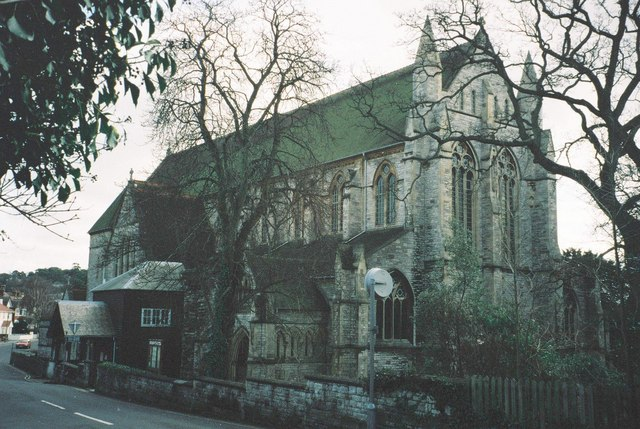
- St Peter's Church in 1999

Religion
- Affiliation: Church of England

Location
- Location: Parkstone, Poole, Dorset, England
- Interactive map of St Peter's Church
- Coordinates: 50.7246°N 1.9531°W

Architecture
- Architects: Frederick Rogers; John Loughborough Pearson
- Type: Church
- Style: Victorian
- Completed: 1881

St. Peter's Church is a historic Anglican church in the Parkstone area of Poole, Dorset, England.

== History ==
The church was commenced in 1876 and completed in 1881 to a design by Frederick Rogers. John Loughborough Pearson made alterations, including adding vestries and an organ chamber, followed by the nave in 1891–92. It was completed by his son, Frank. On 30 October 1912, Robert Baden-Powell and Olave Baden-Powell married at the church in a private ceremony. In 1954, the church was made a Grade II* listed building. On 4 June 2022, amid the Platinum Jubilee of Elizabeth II, the church was struck by lightning destroying the stone cross on the roof. In 2022, an application for the demolition of the church hall for the redevelopment into housing was made. The planning permission was refused by Bournemouth, Christchurch and Poole Council but in 2023 another application was made.

== Burials ==
- Richard Hawksworth Barnes (1831–1904), meteorologist and naturalist.

== See also ==
- List of churches in Poole
- List of ecclesiastical restorations and alterations by J. L. Pearson
