= St Aldhelm's Church, Poole =

Church in Poole, UK

St Aldhelm's Church
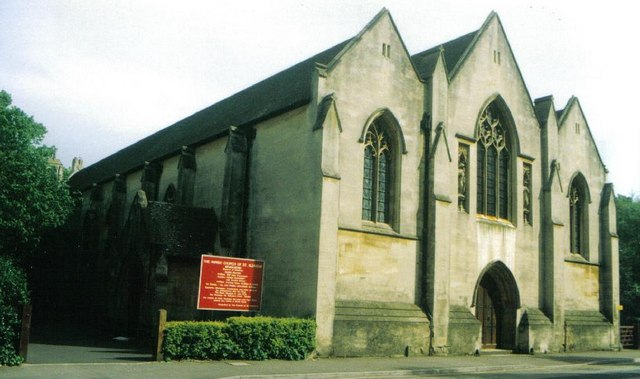
- St Aldhelm's Church in 2001

Religion
- Affiliation: Anglicanism
- Ecclesiastical or organisational status: active

Location
- Location: Bournemouth, Dorset, England
- Interactive map of St Aldhelm's Church
- Coordinates: 50.7258°N 1.91854°W

Architecture
- Architects: George Frederick Bodley; Thomas Garner
- Type: Church
- Style: Gothic Revival architecture
- Completed: 1894

St Aldhelm's Church is a Grade II* listed Gothic Revival Anglican church in the Branksome area of Poole, Dorset, England. It is dedicated to Saint Aldhelm, the abbot of Malmesbury Abbey who became first Bishop of Sherborne in the early 8th century.

== History ==
Rev. Alexander Morden-Bennett, first vicar of St Peter's Church, Bournemouth, began to evangelise to pottery workers in the area around 1875. He established St. Aldhelm's School near the Carter pottery, which was used as a mission church on Sundays. The parish of All Saints, Branksome, took charge of the mission upon its establishment in 1877, and its third vicar, Rev. C.G. Doyne, initiated construction of the permanent church in Bourne Valley starting in 1892. St. Aldhelm's became its own parish on 30 December 1930.

== Architecture ==
The land upon which the church stands was donated by R.J. Bates, and the Decorated Style design was provided by George Frederick Bodley and Thomas Garner. The first part of the church, from the east end to about two thirds of its present length, was dedicated by John Wordsworth, Bishop of Salisbury, on 11 July 1894, and the church was expanded to its current footprint in 1912, dedicated in 29 June by Bishop Frederick Ridgeway.

The exterior is of ashlar work in Bath stone, also used in the pillars and windows. The stained glass windows in the east and south walls were produced by Burlison and Grylls of London, and the west wall from C.E. Kempe & Co.

== Popular culture ==
Television producer David Croft named the church in Dad's Army after St. Aldhelm's as he was born in Poole and attended the church as a boy.

== Gallery ==
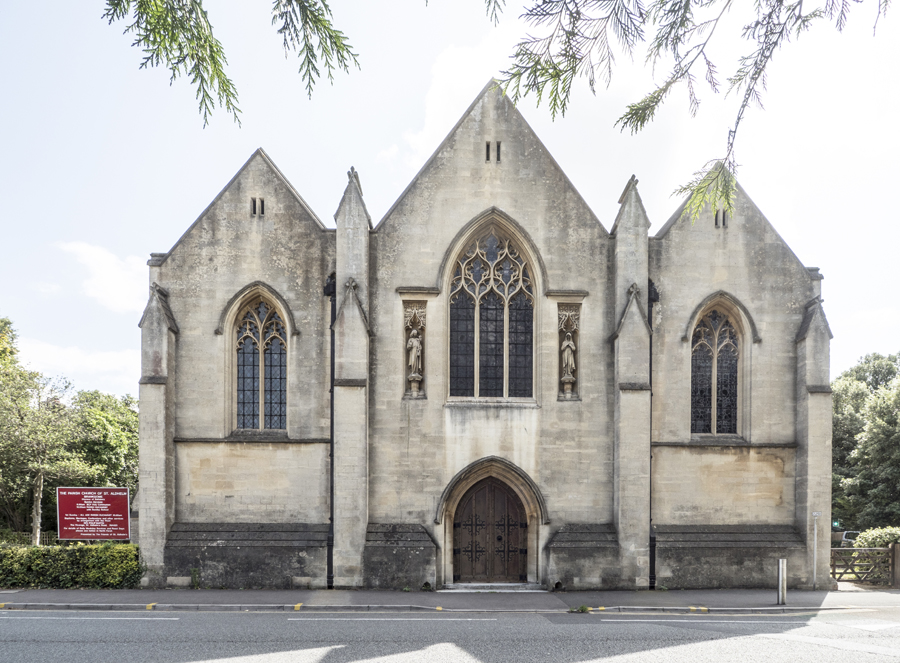
Front of the church.

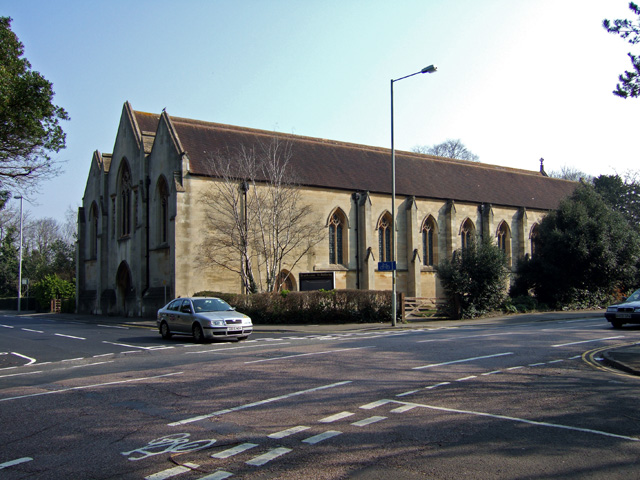
As seen from St Aldhelm's Road.

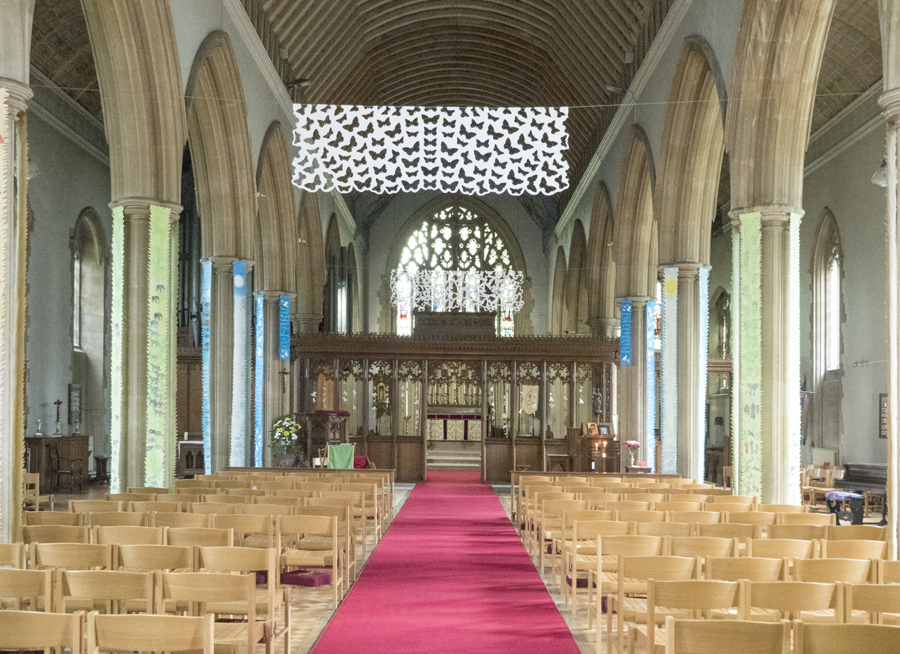
Inside of the church.

== See also ==
- List of churches in Poole
