= Battle of Wandiwash =

1760 battle of the Seven Years' War

- Part of the Seven Years' War
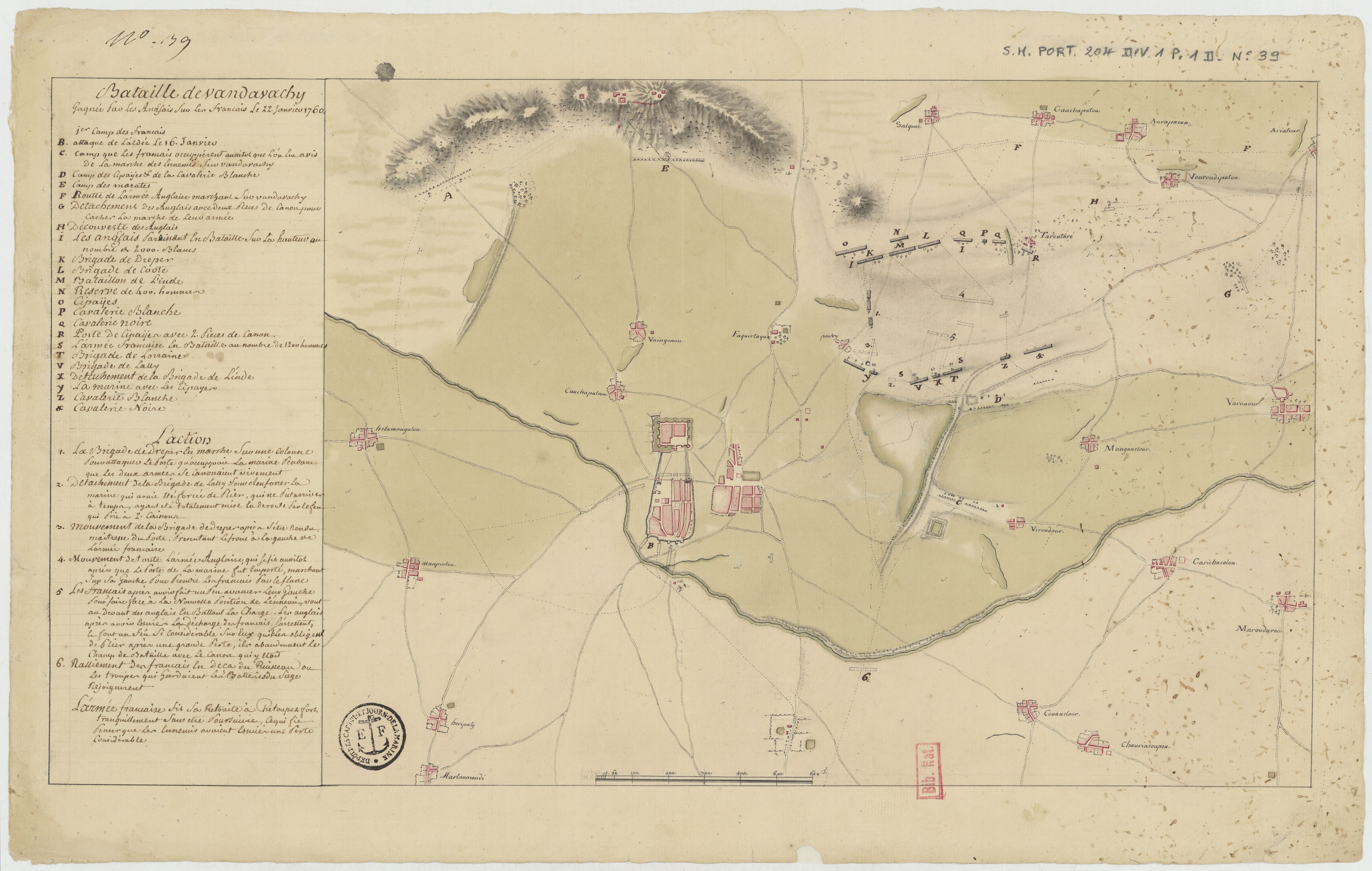
- French map of the battle
Date	22 January 1760
Location	Vandavasi, Tamil Nadu, India 12.5000°N 79.6200°E
Result	British victory

Belligerents
British East India Company	French Indies Company; Maratha Empire

Commanders and leaders
Sir Eyre Coote	Comte de Lally

Strength
1,900 European infantry 2,100 Indian sepoys 80 European cavalry 250 Indian cavalry 26 guns	2,250 European infantry 1,300 Indian sepoys 300 European cavalry 3,000 Maratha infantry 16 guns

Casualties and losses
192 killed or wounded	600–800 killed, wounded or captured
- Location within Tamil Nadu Wandiwash (India)

The Battle of Wandiwash was a battle in India between the French and the British in 1760. The battle was part of the Third Carnatic War fought between the French and British colonial empires, which itself was a part of the global Seven Years' War. It took place at Vandavasi (Wandiwash being the Anglicised pronunciation) in Tamil Nadu. Having made substantial gains in Bengal and Hyderabad, the British, after collecting a large amount of revenue, were fully equipped to face the French in Wandiwash, whom they defeated.

== Order of battle ==
According to the 19th century book Annals of the Wars of the Eighteenth Century by Author Eduard Cust, the French Army consisted of 300 European Cavalry, 2,250 European infantry, 1,300 sepoys (Indian soldiers), 3,000 Marathas and 16 pieces of artillery while the British deployed about 80 European Horses, 250 Native horses, 1,900 European Infantry, 2,100 sepoys and 26 pieces of artillery.

== Battle ==
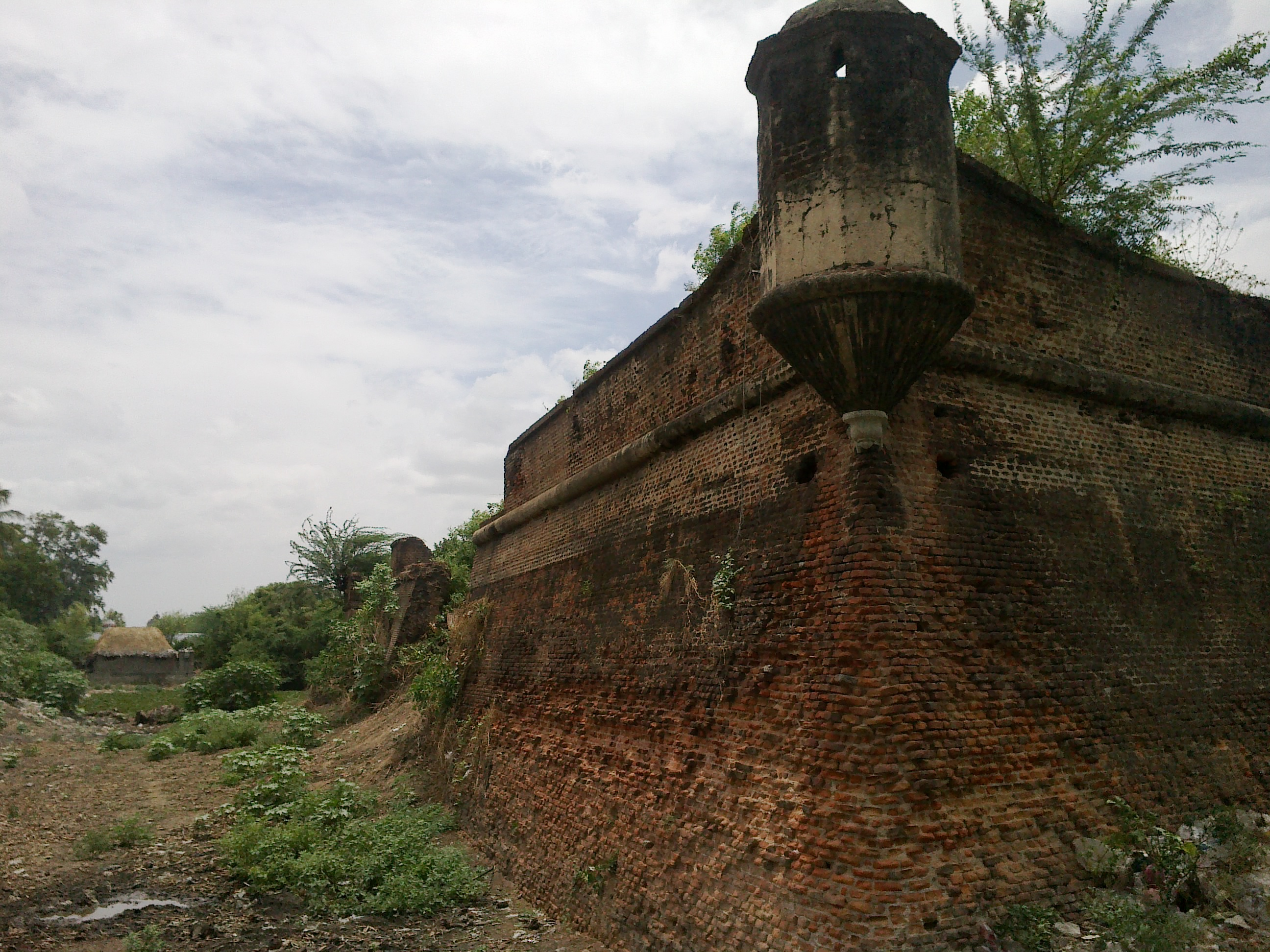
Fort of Vandavasi

The French, commanded by the Comte de Lally, were burdened by a lack of naval support and funds, even after support from local Polygars and the Pillai family. and therefore attempted to regain the fort of Vandavasi, now in Tamil Nadu. While attempting to do so, they were attacked by British forces commanded by Sir Eyre Coote, and in the ensuing battle, the French were decisively defeated.

== Aftermath ==
Political situation in India at the end of the Seven Years' War

The Battle of Wandiwash resulted in the British capture of Chetpattu (Chetpet), Tirunomalai (Thiruvannaamalai), Tindivanam and Perumukkal. As a consequence of the engagement, the French in South India, under the command of general Marquis de Bussy-Castelnau, were then restricted to Pondichéry, where they surrendered on 22 January 1761 after defending pondicherry for eight months. The collapse of the French position in India was one of the events that compelled France to sign the Treaty of Paris, reducing the French to little more than traders in India, and effectively ending further French imperial ambitions in that country. Britain, on the other hand, established its supremacy in India over other European powers after this battle.

== See also ==
- Great Britain in the Seven Years' War
- France in the Seven Years' War
