= Joseph Gulston (collector) =

English collector, connoisseur and Member of Parliament (1745–1786)

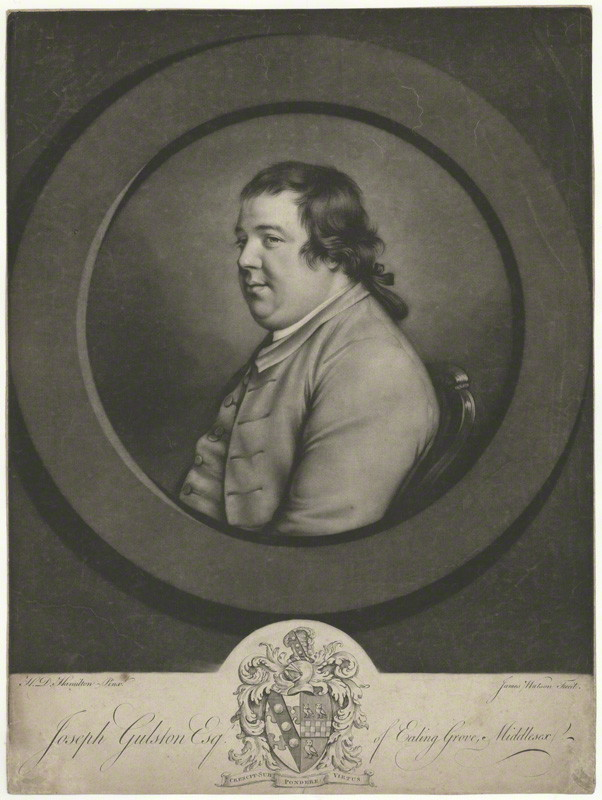
Joseph Gulston (1745–1786) by J. Watson, after H.D. Hamilton

Joseph Gulston (1745–1786), was an English collector and connoisseur, and a Member of Parliament.

== Family background ==
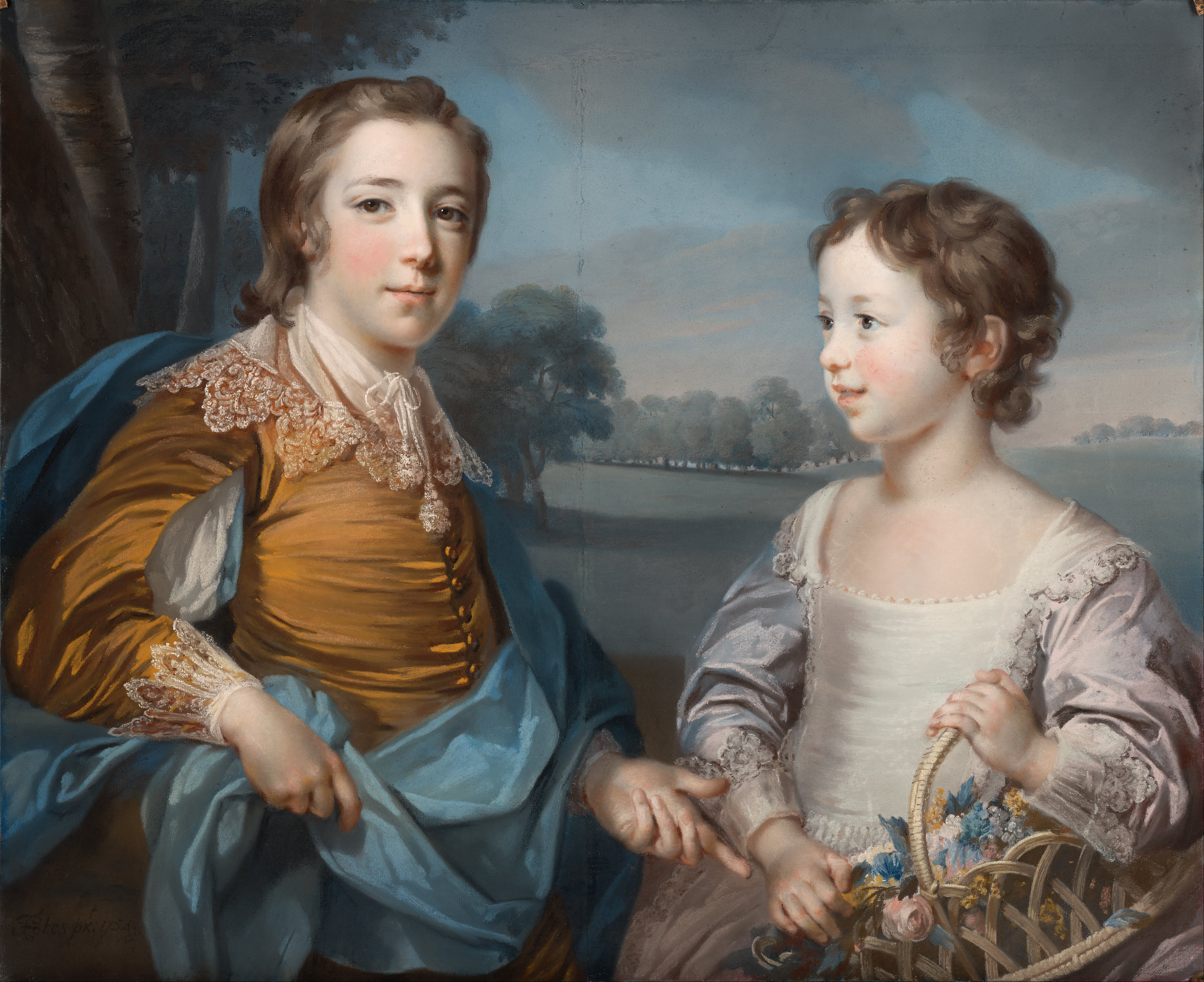
Portrait of Joseph Gulston and his brother John in 1754, by Francis Cotes.

His father, Joseph Gulston, a successful loan contractor, was M.P. for Poole from 1741 to 1765 and built the town hall there. He had secretly married Mericas, daughter of a Portuguese merchant named Sylva, and she was living at Greenwich when her son Joseph was born under the romantic circumstances which form the groundwork of Clementina Black's novel Mericas. The marriage was not acknowledged for many years, principally owing to the elder Joseph Gulston's dread of his sister, and for some time the four children were brought up in the strictest concealment.

== Early life ==
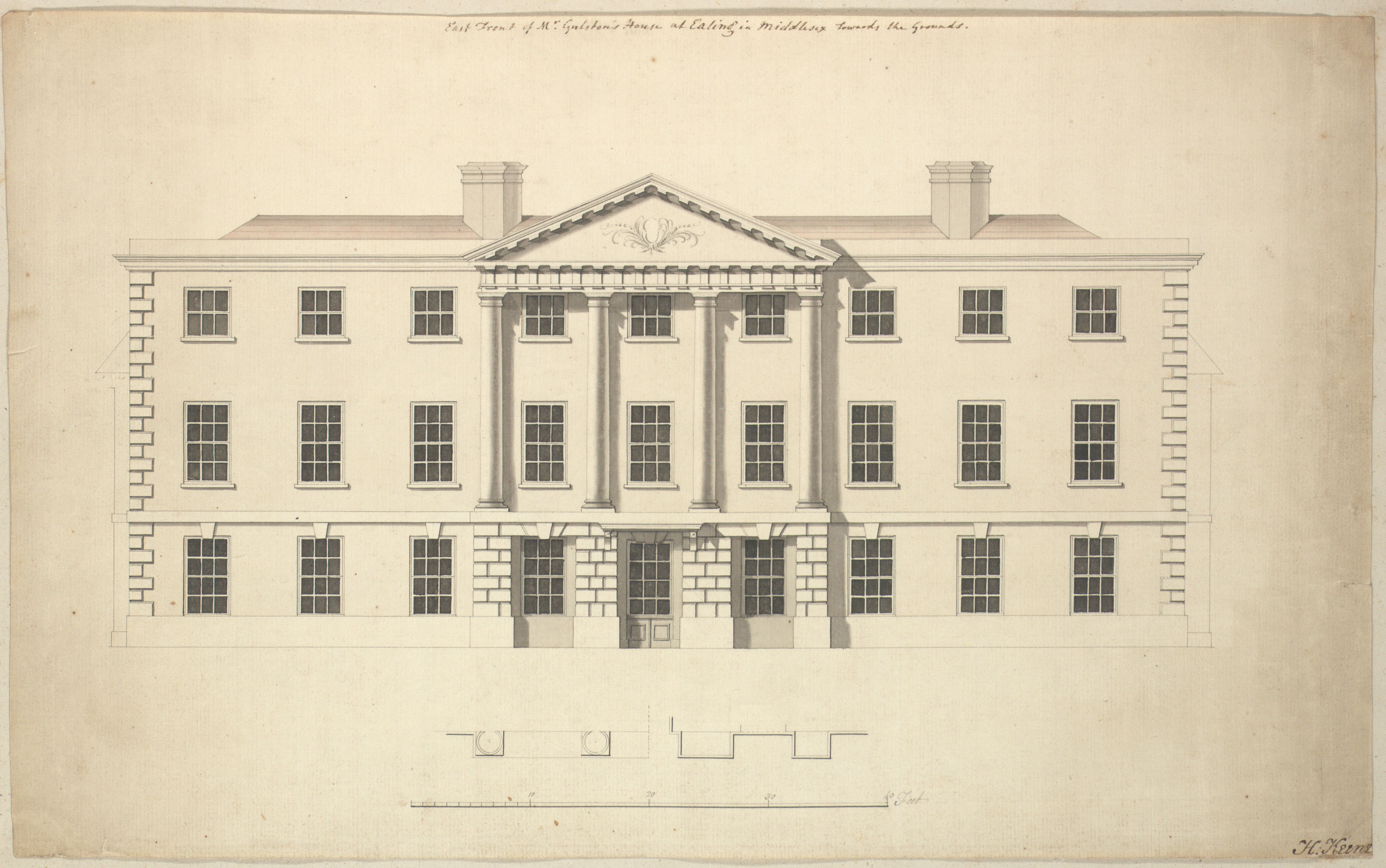
Architectural drawing for Ealing Grove

Upon his father's death in 1766, Joseph, who had latterly been educated at Eton College and at Christ Church, Oxford, where he matriculated 18 February 1763, found himself in possession of £250,000 in the funds, an estate in Hertfordshire worth £1,500 a year, Ealing Grove, Middlesex, and a house in Soho Square. This fortune he dissipated in collecting books and prints, in building, and in all kinds of extravagance except vicious ones. He spent £30,000 converting Ealing Grove into an Italianate villa and in 1768 started his collection of prints.

His indolence equalled his extravagance; though handsome he was of a corpulent habit of body, he was elected M.P. for Poole in 1780, but lost his seat in 1784 by neglecting to get out of bed till too late in the day to solicit the votes of five Quaker constituents.

== Financial Crisis ==
After a succession of expedients, sales of property, consignments of annuities, and spasmodic efforts at economy, he sold his books in June 1784. George III was a purchaser at the sale. At length, in 1786, Gulston was compelled to dispose of his unrivalled collection of prints, which, besides the works of the great masters, contained 18,000 foreign and 23,500 English portraits, 11,000 caricatures and political prints, and 14,500 topographical. The sale lasted forty days (from 16 January to 15 March 1786), but produced only £7,000, and the unfortunate possessor, overwhelmed with family cares and pecuniary difficulties, died in Bryanston Street, London, on 16 July 1786, and was buried in Ealing Church.

Gulston was a most amiable man, whose faults were in great measure due to his physical constitution and defective education at the most susceptible period of his life. He was highly accomplished in many ways, and his memory was most retentive. He was partly engaged for several years in the preparation of a biographical dictionary of the foreigners who have visited England; the manuscript was purchased by a bookseller after his death, but no use seems to have been made of it. Gulston was a fellow of the Society of Antiquaries. A few of his letters to his friend Granger are printed by Nichols.

== Family ==
Gulston married Elizabeth Bridgetta, second daughter of Sir Thomas Stepney, Bt., a woman as extravagant as himself celebrated for her beauty and accomplishments, and as the inventor of plated harness. She was also an etcher, and etched portraits of her husband and of Dr. Francis Courayer from paintings by Hamilton in 1772 (Nichols, Lit. Anecdotes, ii. 44). She died 9 March 1780, and was buried at Ealing. A son Joseph, after a troubled career of dissipation, died at Lausanne, 18 Dec. 1790, aged 22 (see for an account of his difficulties ib. ix. 605–6).

== Portrait ==
A portrait of Gulston is prefixed to Nichols's 'Literary Illustrations,' vol. v. There are mezzotint engravings of Gulston and of his wife by James Watson and Richard Earlom after paintings by Hamilton.
