= Thomas Calcraft =

English politician and Lieutenant-Colonel

Thomas Calcraft (1738–1783) was an English politician and a lieutenant-colonel. He was the Member of Parliament for Poole from 1761 to 1774.

== Life ==
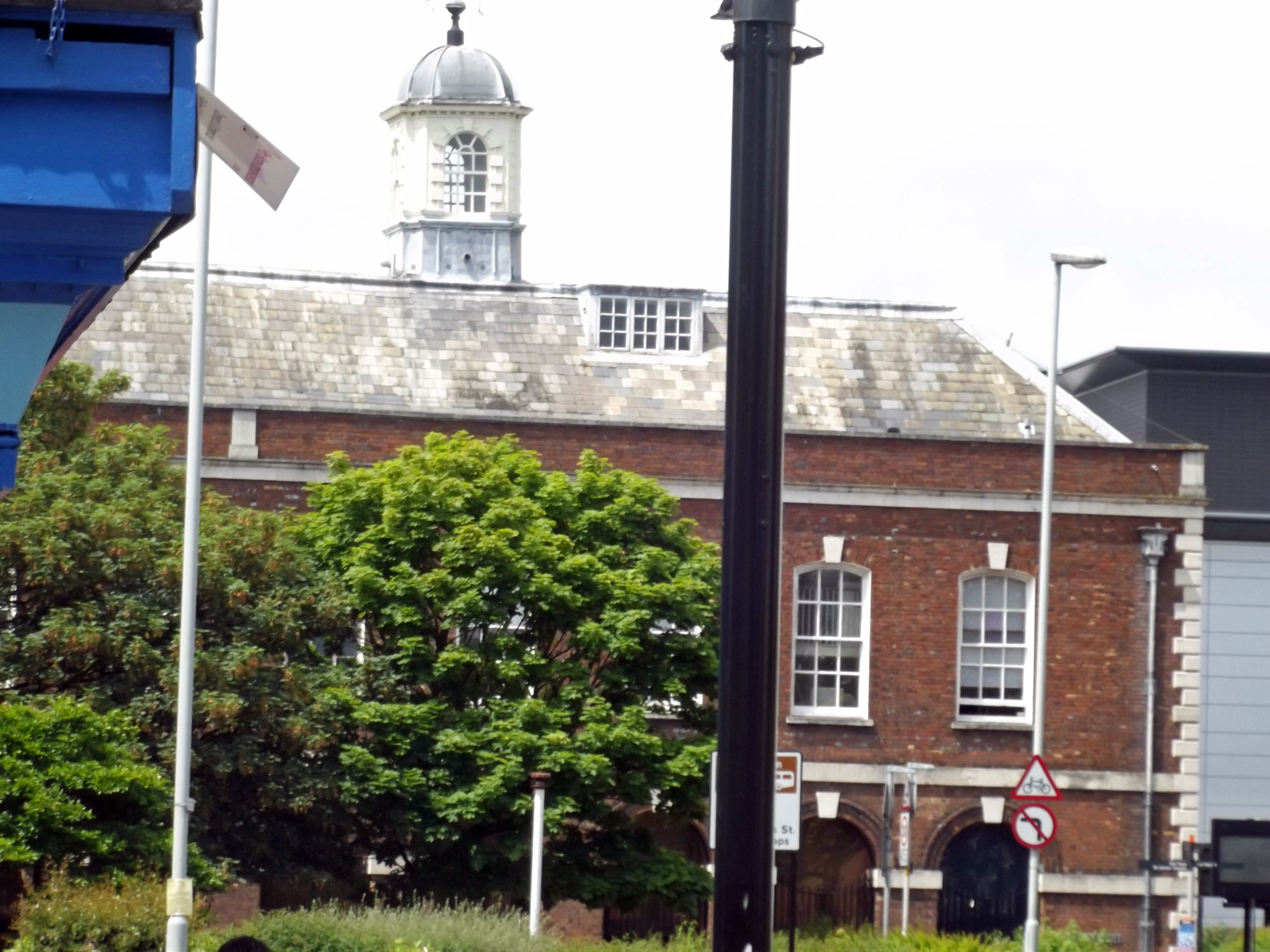
Poole Guildhall

He was born in Ancaster, Lincolnshire. His brother was John Calcraft.

He was elected Member of Parliament at the 1761 British general election.

Together with his fellow MP Joseph Gulston, he is credited with financing Poole Guildhall.
