= Joseph Gulston (politician) =

British merchant and Member of Parliament

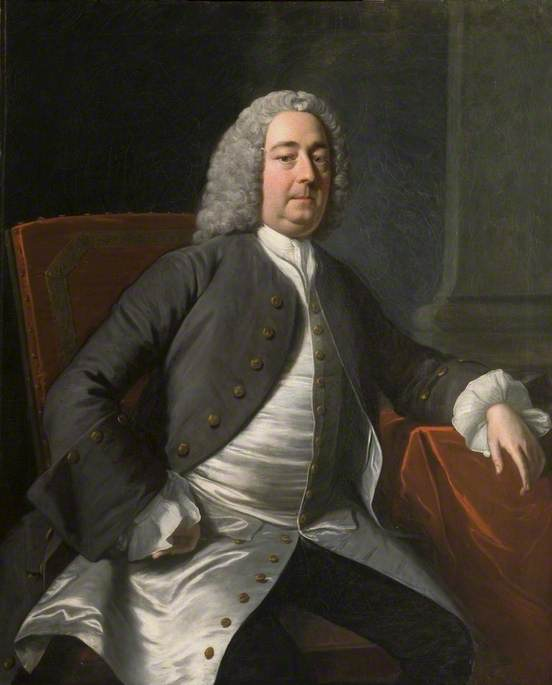
Joseph Gulston (1694–1766), painting attributed to Thomas Hudson

Joseph Gulston (1674-1766) was a British merchant and Member of Parliament.

He was the son of Joseph Gulston, a London merchant trading in Lisbon. He became a merchant himself and a director of the South Sea Company from 1742 to 1760.

He was elected to Parliament for Tregony 1737-1741 and elected for Poole in 1741, 1747, 1754, and 1761. Together with his fellow MP Thomas Calcraft, he is credited with financing Poole Guildhall.

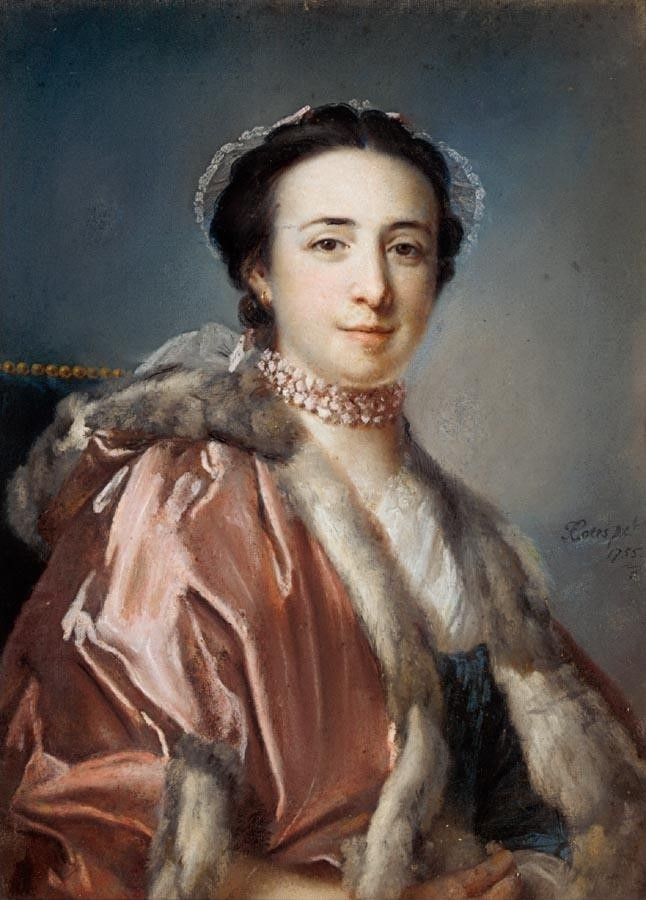
Mericas da Silva painted by Francis Cotes in 1755

He married his wife, Mericas da Silva, in secret. She was the daughter of a Portuguese merchant named Sylva and had come to London with the family on their return. Joseph and Mericas's son, Joseph, was born under the circumstances which form the groundwork of Clementina Black's novel Mericas. The marriage was not acknowledged for many years, principally owing to the elder Joseph Gulston's dread of his sister, and for some time his children, two sons and two daughters, were brought up in the strictest concealment.

Gulston died 16 August 1766 and his wife 17 November 1799, aged 84. Both were buried in Ealing Church. His son Joseph followed him as MP for Poole and inherited his estates, including Ealing Grove in Middlesex, which he would later rebuild.
