= St Dunstan of Canterbury Orthodox Church =

Church in Dorset, England

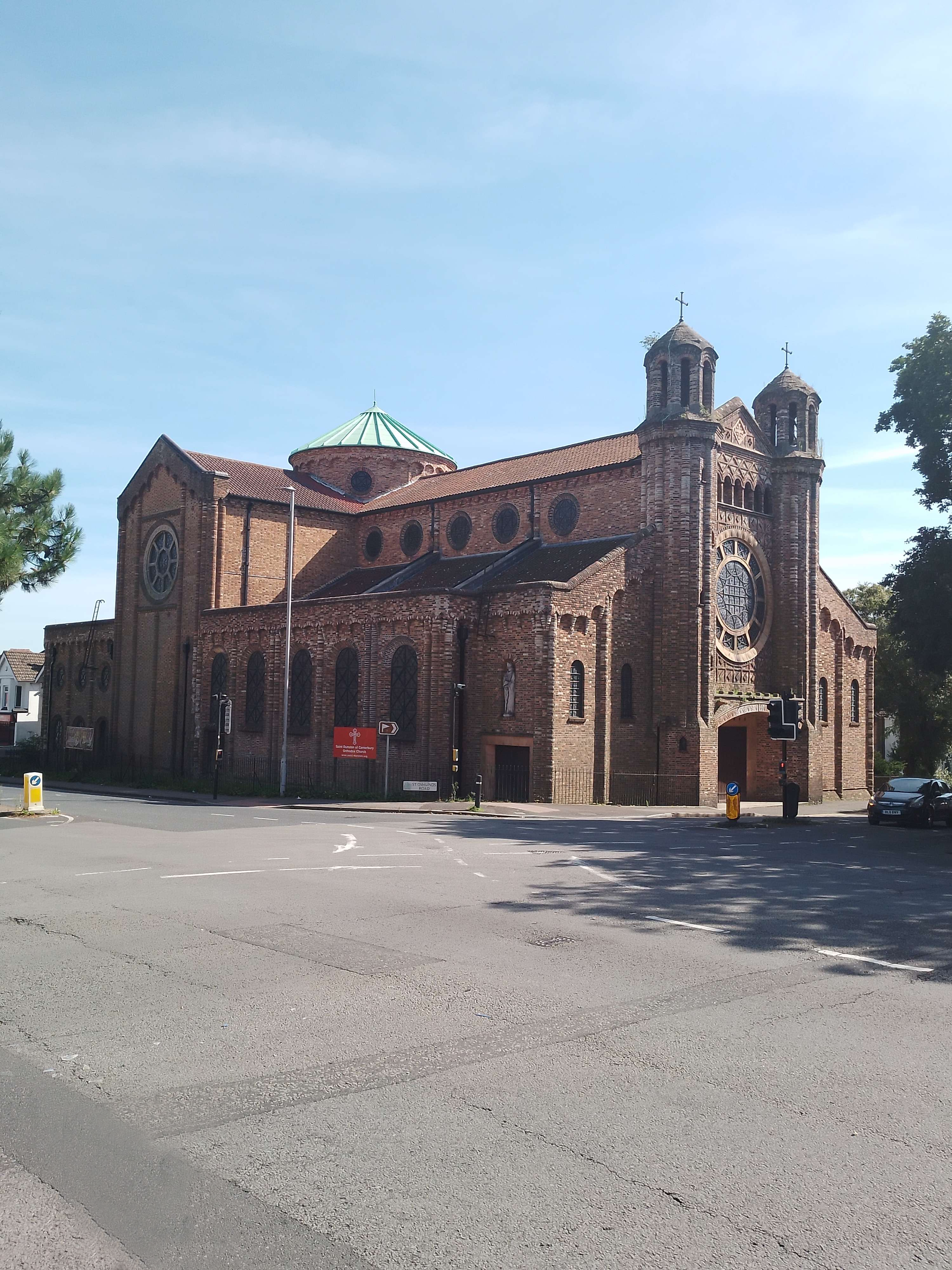
- View from the northwest
- St Dunstan of Canterbury Orthodox Church
- 50°43′28″N 1°56′19″W
- Denomination: Antiochian Orthodox Church
- Website: https://www.saint-dunstan.org/

History
- Former name(s): Church of St Osmund; St Stephen the Great Church
- Dedication: St Dunstan

Architecture
- Architect(s): G. A. B. Livesay, E. S. Prior, Arthur Grove
- Style: Neo-Byzantine
- Completed: 1927

Administration
- Archdiocese: British Isles and Ireland
- Parish: Bournemouth and Poole

St Dunstan of Canterbury Orthodox Church is an Antiochian Orthodox church in Parkstone, Poole, Dorset. It is the parish church for Bournemouth and Poole within the Antiochian Orthodox Archdiocese of The British Isles and Ireland. A Grade II* listed building, the church was built in the early 20th century in Neo-Byzantine style by the architects G. A. B. Livesay, Edward Schroeder Prior and Arthur Grove as the Anglican Church of St Osmund. Its west front has been called Prior's final tour de force of church architecture.

Closed by the Church of England in 2001, and declared redundant, it subsequently became an Orthodox church and was rededicated, first as St Stephen the Great Church, and then as St Dunstan's.

== History ==
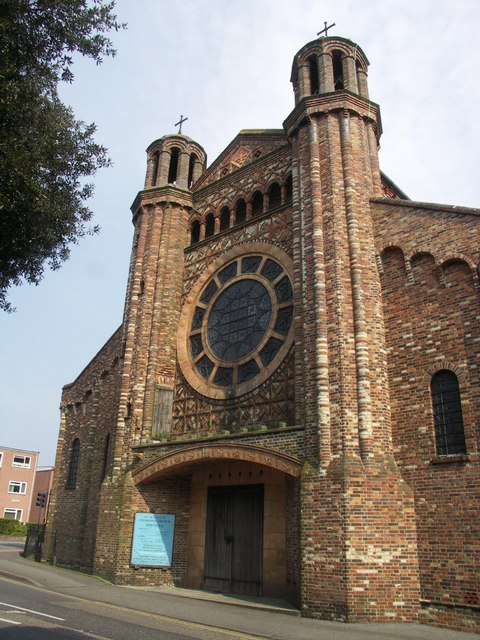
The west front

In 1904–05 Bournemouth architect G. A. B. Livesay built the eastern end of the church, establishing a Byzantine style in brick and terracotta which was followed sympathetically by the later architects. The chancel has a semi-domed apse and a semicircular ambulatory. It contains a ciborium built over the crypt, evoking the Basilica of San Clemente in Rome.

The church was completed by the Arts and Crafts architect Edward Schroeder Prior, in collaboration with Arthur Grove who seems to have concentrated on the finer detailing. It was Prior's last major work. Most was built during 1913–16, but the north aisle and transept were only completed in 1927.

Prior used multicoloured handmade bricks from Wareham, and his own patented thick handmade stained glass. He used reinforced concrete for the dome over the crossing and the barrel vaults of the aisles; flaws in the concrete necessitated some later rebuilding by other architects in 1922 and 1950. Below the dome, the column at each corner of the crossing has four terracotta angels, with outstretched wings, attached to its capital.

The imposing west front displays an eclectic mix of styles, and has been described as being prophetic of Expressionism. The central double door is surmounted by a shallow terracotta arch which extends between two flanking, polygonal turrets. Above, there is a balustrade and a 12-division terracotta wheel window containing geometrical patterns of stained glass. At the top there is an arcade surmounted by a gable, and Byzantine-style cupolas on the turrets. The church has more wheel windows, of 8 divisions, at the transept ends.

Further problems with the concrete vaulting, as well as low attendance numbers among the congregation, prompted the Church of England's closure of the church in 2001. It was thereafter sold to the jurisdiction of the Eastern Orthodox Church, first to the Romanian and then to the Antiochian authority, in which hands it remains today.

== Organ ==
The 1931 church organ was built by John Compton. Its functional parts were given to a church elsewhere after the taking on of the building by the Orthodox Church (since in that tradition there is no usage of musical instruments during services) though its exterior structure remains.
