= Poole United Reformed Church =

Church in Poole, England

Coordinates: 50°42′49″N 1°59′01″W

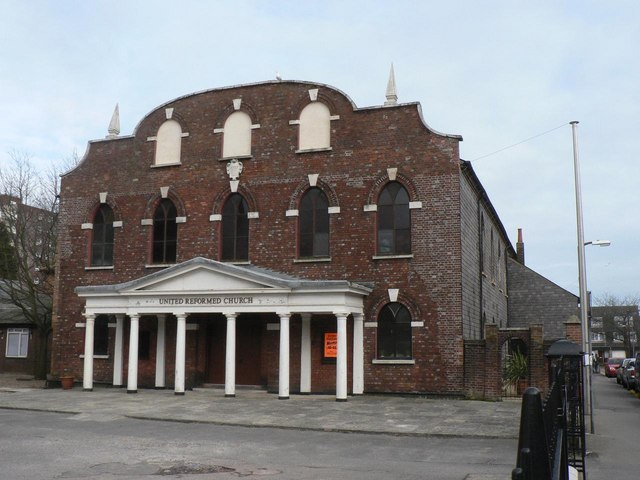
Poole United Reformed Church in 2008.

Skinner Street United Reformed Church is the oldest church in Poole, Dorset, England. The current building is the only eighteenth century church building in Poole, and is a Grade II* listed building. The church has a grave for Cyril Coles, one of the gunners in the first tank attack in 1916. The church is used as an adult learning centre.

== History ==
The original chapel was built in 1662, making it Poole's oldest surviving church. In 1663, John Wesley's eponymously named grandfather became first minister of the chapel. The church moved to a new building in 1760, and the present Georgian building was built in 1777 for £1,440. It is the only eighteenth century church building in Poole The current vestry was added in 1814, and the chapel was extended in 1823, with the introduction of new galleries, at a cost of around £2,000. The roof was altered in 1886. In the nineteenth century, the church had a congregation of over 1,000 people, and the congregation was later split into other United Reformed Churches, including one in Newfoundland. The building and its north-eastern wall and railings became a Grade II* listed building in 1954. In 2014, the church received a grant of £5,000 from the Dorset Historic Churches Trust for roof repairs. In 2015, the church offered free dental care and flu jabs to homeless people.

In 2021, a blue plaque to naturist Philip Henry Gosse was dedicated at the church.
