= List of islands in Poole Harbour =

List of Islands in Poole Harbour, Dorset

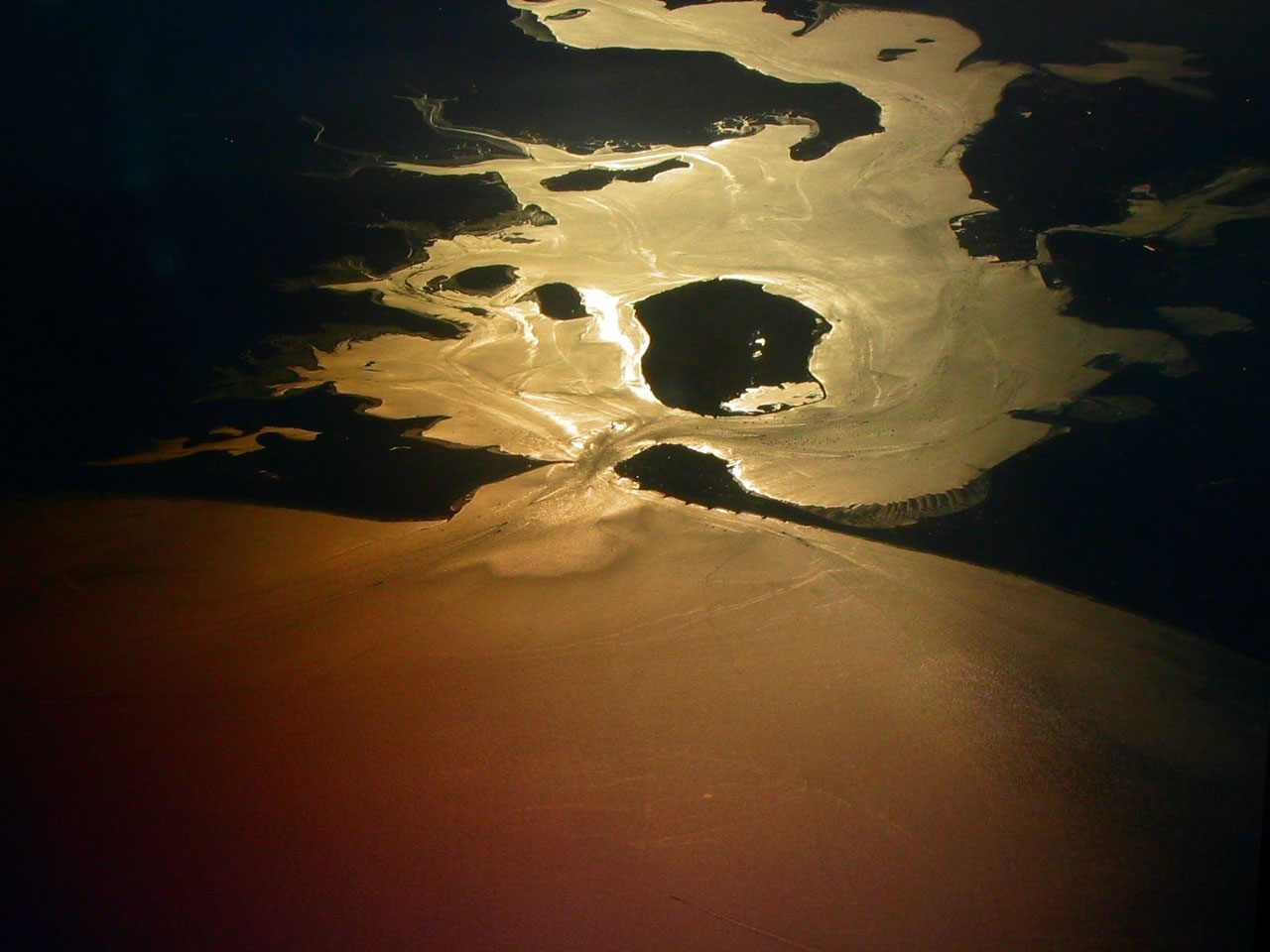
Aerial view of the harbour entrance, looking west-north-west. The large island just inside the entrance is Brownsea Island.

This is a list of islands located in Poole Harbour, Dorset, England, as well as a table of the islands by area.

The harbour is the location of a number of islands, of various sizes. There are 10 islands in Poole Harbour that are recognised with names, and several smaller marshland islands and sand islets which are only visible at low tide. Three such marshland islands can be found in the Wareham Channel. There are also a variety of unnamed islands in the harbour: There is an unnamed artificial island in the West Lake of Brownsea Island, an unnamed island in the Imerys Pool and several more unnamed marshland islands in the harbour. This list documents the ten named islands each in order of size.

Of the islands in Poole Harbour, only one, Brownsea Island, is permanently inhabited, with 30 residents. It is also the largest by land area. Furzey Island, Green Island and Round Island also host non-permanent populations of oil drillers, private owners and holiday staff respectively. All other islands listed have no population.

== Islands by land area ==
No.	Name	Size	Population
1	Brownsea Island	500 acres (202 ha)	30
2	Furzey Island	31 acres (13 ha)	0
3	Green Island	19 acres (8 ha)	0
4	Pergins Island	15.3 acres (6 ha)	0
5	Round Island	15 acres (6 ha)	0
6	Long Island	9.5 acres (4 ha)	0
7	Gigger's Island	6 acres (2 ha)	0
8	Stone Island	100 yards (91 m) in length	0
9	Drove Island	Unknown	0
10	Otter Island	Unknown	0

== List of islands ==
=== Brownsea Island ===
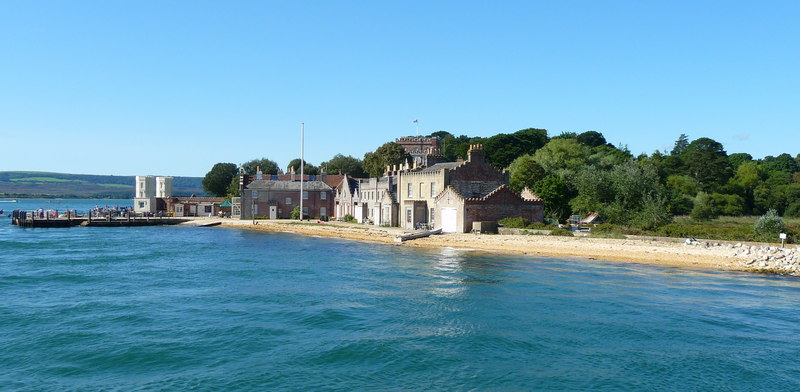
Brownsea Castle and piers on Brownsea Island

Brownsea Island is the largest of the islands in Poole Harbour, and the only island with a permanent population, around 30 residents. It is owned by the National Trust and the northern half managed by the Dorset Wildlife Trust. The island is open to the public and includes areas of woodland and heath with a wide variety of wildlife that includes sika deer, peacocks, common tern and sandwich tern. Brownsea is also one of the few places in southern England where indigenous red squirrels survive, largely because non-native grey squirrels have never been introduced to the island.

The island is home to Brownsea Castle, a 16th century fortification, is the site of a scout camp, and can be accessed by private ferry. There are two freshwater lakes on the island, West and East lake, the former of which contains an artificial island to host birds. Additionally, the island has a saltwater lagoon, Brownsea Lagoon, which is a sanctuary for thousands of nesting and breeding birds.

=== Furzey Island ===
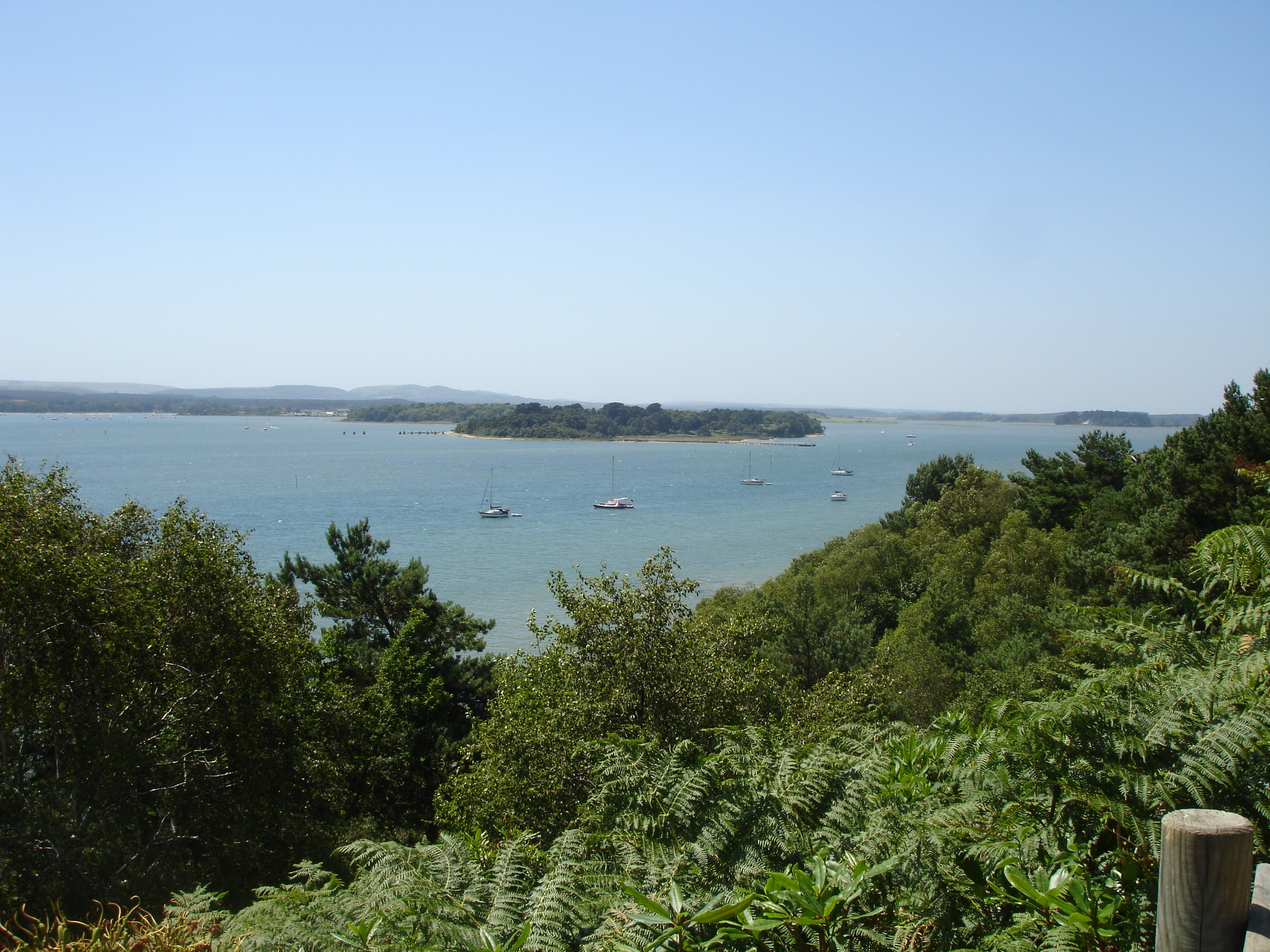
Furzey Island seen from Brownsea Island

Furzey Island is the second largest of the islands in Poole Harbour. The island has been active in oil drilling since the 1970s; there are twenty-two oil wells on the island split into two well-sites for the Wytch Farm Oil Field, which is linked by a 91 km pipeline to Hamble. The well-sites are staffed 24 hours a day, but the island has no permanent population. The island has been estimated to produce 20,000 barrels of oil a day, and to therefore make around £1,000,000 a day.

Furzey Island is believed to have made up a much larger island with Green Island around two thousand years ago, and there is evidence of Iron Age inhabitation of the island to support this. The island is not open to the public, and is owned and operated by oil and gas company Perenco. Furzey hosts a population of red squirrels, and is the only other island in Poole Harbour, excluding Brownsea Island and Green Island, to host a population of red squirrels.

=== Green Island ===
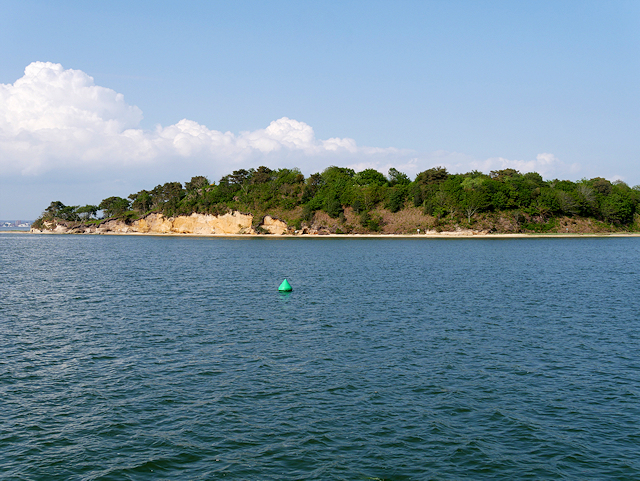
Green Island in 2016

Green Island is the third largest of the islands in Poole Harbour. The island is a Site of Special Scientific Interest (SSSI) and Special Protection Area (SPA), and is within the Dorset National Landscape. The island is covered in woodland made up of Scots pine with several small zones of heathland. Green Island is believed to have made up a much larger island with Furzey Island around two thousand years ago. The island has a large salt marsh, several small glades and a beach. Green Island is privately owned by Edward Iliffe, a newspaper group owner.

Green Island has two buildings: a two-bedroom summer house and a single-story cabin known as the Greensleaves. Green Island is the third and smallest island in Poole Harbour, excluding Brownsea Island and Furzey Island, to host a population of red squirrels.

In 2012, a fire on the island wiped out a four-storey timber building that was still under construction. A legal battle followed, and the construction company was fined an undisclosed seven digit sum after it was found that a log burner or flue had been installed incorrectly.

=== Pergins Island ===
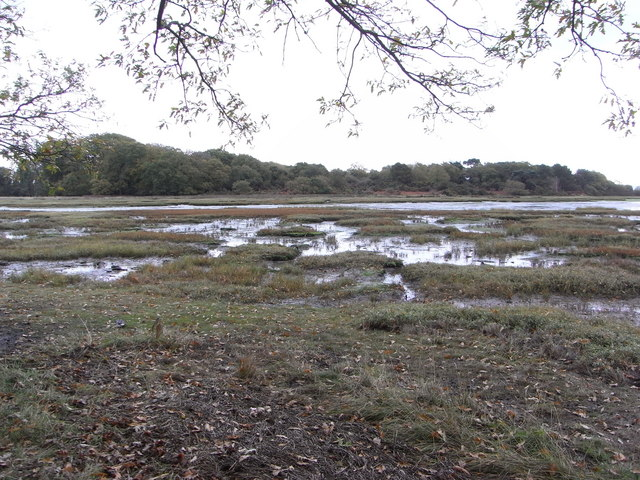
Pergins Island seen from Upton Country Park, Holes Bay

Pergins Island is the fourth largest island in Poole Harbour, located in Holes Bay. It is densely covered with broadleaved, mixed and yew woodland, and is not accessible to the public as it is privately owned. Historically, the island was known as Doughty's Island after Sir Edward Doughty, who owned it at the time. Pergins Island was used by the poor people of Poole and Hamworthy to use the island for camping, to escape the slums which became very unhealthy during the summer months.

Pergins Island supports many species of seabird such as Mute swans, Eurasian curlews, Eurasian oystercatchers, Water rails, Great egrets and Osprey.

The water around the island is a hazardous zone as it contains thick, deep mud with erratic depth levels. Anyone trying to wade or swim to the island can quickly get stuck or sink up to their waist in the mud making it nearly impossible to get out on their own.

=== Round Island ===
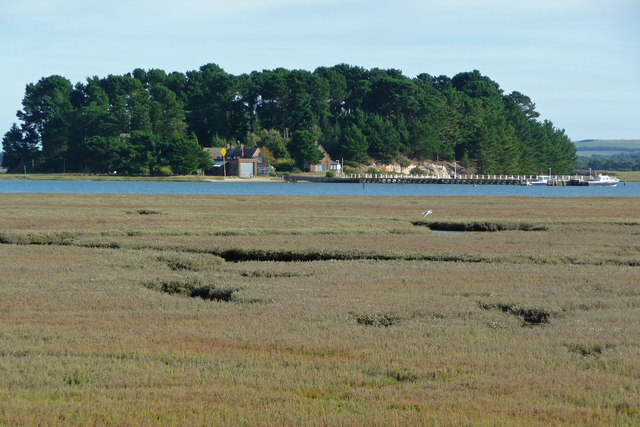
Round Island in 2009

Round Island is the fifth largest island in Poole Harbour. It lies off the Arne Peninsula in the south-west of the harbour, and is separated from Long Island by a narrow channel only a few feet wide. It is dominated by rhododendrons and woodland and offers holiday cottages. It is also the smallest of the islands in Poole Harbour to host a population of peacocks. The island is privately owned.

In the 15th century, the island was said to be home to Harry Paye, a notorious pirate from Poole who used the harbor to hide ships and rob merchant vessels. During World War II, the Royal Navy seized the island to use it as a training ground, working alongside HMS Turtle for the D-Day landings. During the war in 1943, a Catalina flying boat, during a foggy training flight in the early hours, crashed into Round Island, claiming the lives of the pilot and seven other crew members. In 1952, conductor Sir Thomas Beecham stayed on the island while writing the biography of composer Delius.

=== Long Island ===
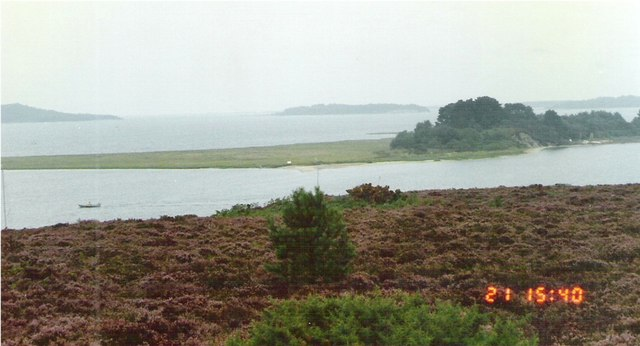
Long Island across Wych Channel From the Arne NR heathland.

Long Island is an uninhabited island in Poole Harbour, off the Arne Peninsula in the south-west of the harbour, and is separated from Round Island by a narrow channel only a few feet wide. The island itself is only a few feet wide and, during low tide, is able to increase in size by almost a quarter. It is the sixth largest island in the harbour.

The Rempstone Estate owned the island for 250 years before selling it in 2010 for £3 million to Dave Wyatt, who reportedly has no plans to develop it and instead intends to preserve it as a wildlife haven. Long Island supports avocets, black-tailed godwits and wildfowl. The island is a Site of Special Scientific Interest and has no public access.

=== Gigger's Island ===
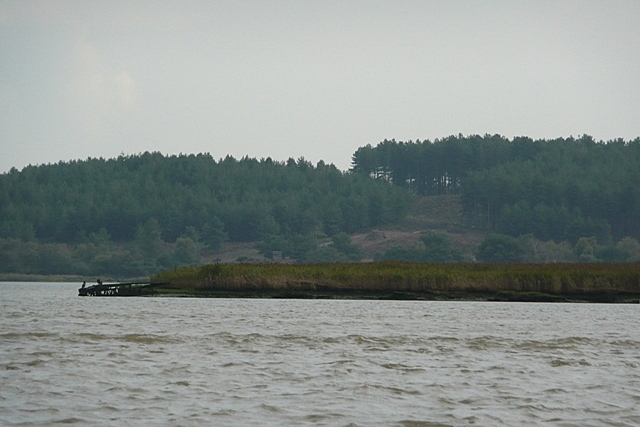
Gigger's Island in 2008

Gigger's Island is an uninhabited island in Poole Harbour, and is situated near to the mouth of the Frome and Piddle rivers. The entrance to Poole Harbour is to the south of Gigger's Island.

In 2006, the island was purchased by the Dorset Wildfowlers Association. It is legal only to touch the shoreline below the high-water mark. At night, the island is home to up to 20,000 gulls.

The island is sometimes referred to as Horse Island locally. This is because, historically, it was used to quarantine horses that arrived in Poole Harbour from abroad.

=== Drove Island ===
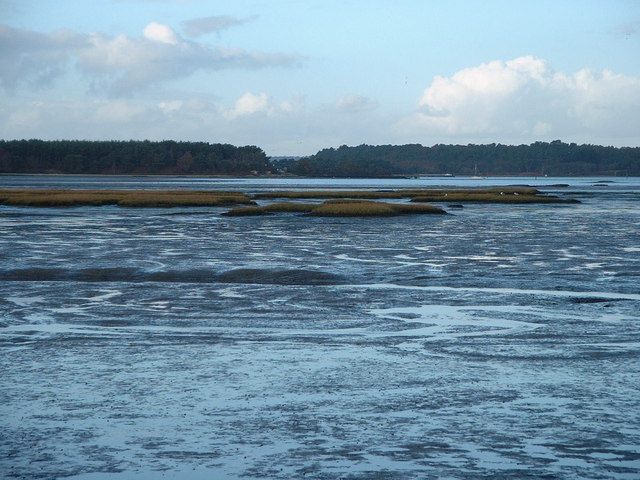
Drove Island seen from Brands Bay

Drove Island is an uninhabited island in Poole Harbour and is situated in Brand's Bay. There are no buildings on the island and it consists of mostly marsh. The island is presumed to be privately owned and landing is not permitted.

The waters around the island are extremely shallow (usually around 48 cm) and it is only accessible by private boat.

The island supports birds including seagulls, avocets, spoonbills, and black-tailed godwits. These birds can usually be seen on the island. The seagrass around the island are also nurseries for fish and shellfish due to the high mix of freshwater and seawater.

=== Stone Island ===
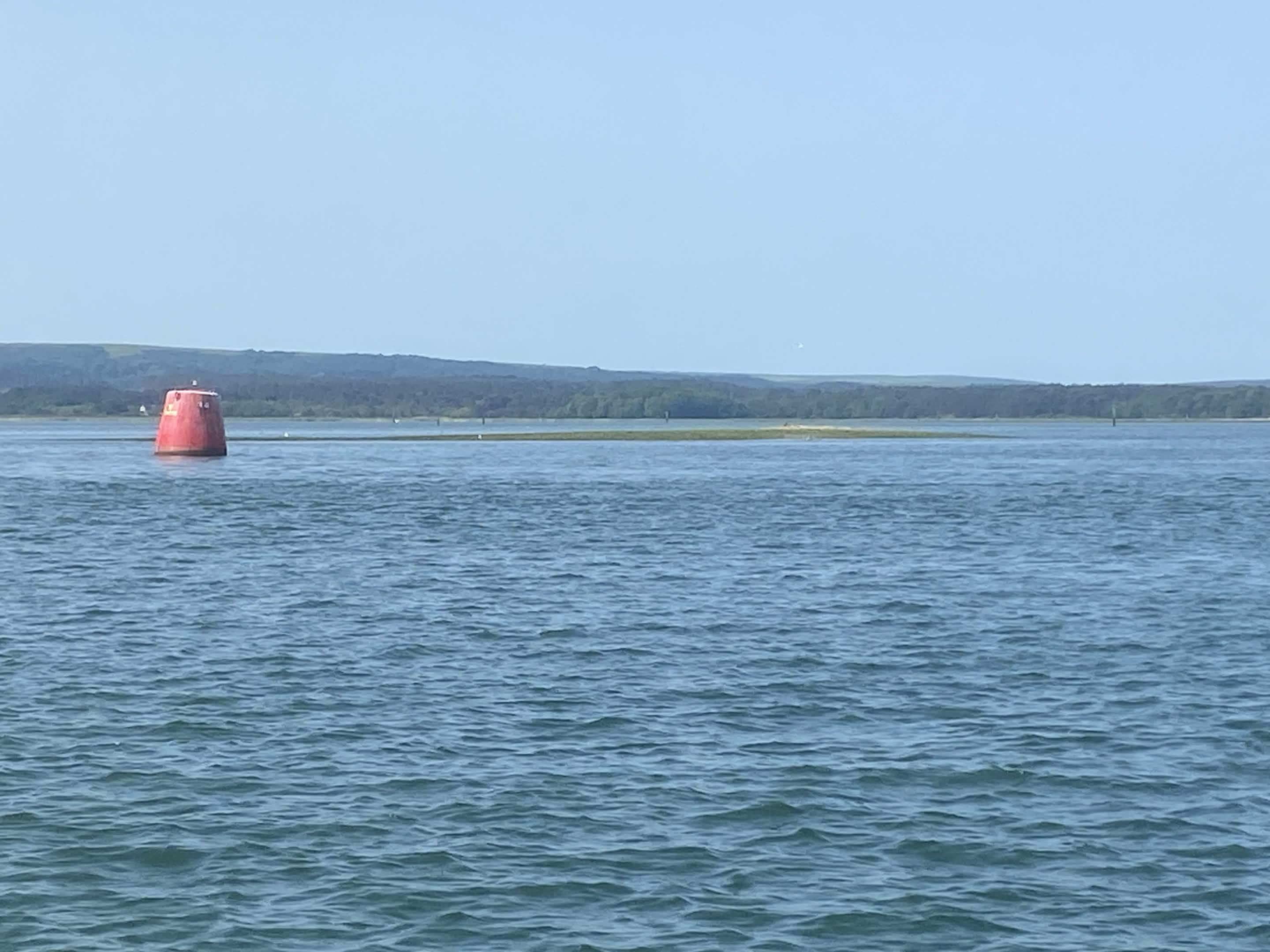
Stone Island at low tide

Stone Island, also known locally as Stoney Island or Tidal Sand Isle, is an uninhabited islet in Poole Harbour, immediately south of Brownsea Island. It consists of the remains of an old recurved shingle spit that is only visible at low tide, and as such it is a danger to sailors. The islet is now gradually being submerged by rising sea-level.

Stone Island consists of gravel and sand and is approximately 100 yards (91 meters) long. The islet is marked on Admiralty Chart 2611. As there is no ferry to the island, it can be accessed only by private vessel. There is very little vegetation on the islet, and it is commonly used by sea birds as a resting spot at low tide.

=== Otter Island ===
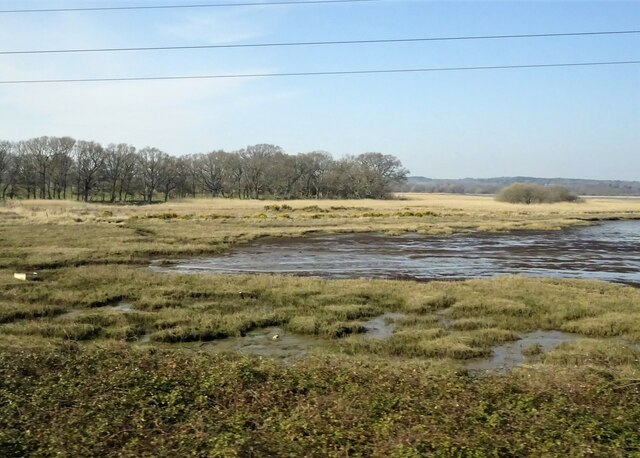
On-island perspective of Otter Island, separated from the mainland by a narrow channel of water

Otter Island is an uninhabited island located in Poole Harbour, specifically Lytchett Bay, where Rock Lea River flows into the harbour. It consists of saltmarsh and reeds, and is separated from the mainland only by a small channel of shallow water. The island is privately owned with no public access. White-tailed eagles, Marsh harriers, Eurasian bittern and Black-headed gulls can be observed on the island.

Whereas earlier landowners allowed the public access to the area's mudflats and channels, there is now no public access to the island. There was a proposal for establishing a public Right of Way to Otter Island in a 2009 legal application, but it was dismissed. Consequently, the islet cannot legally be accessed by the public and can only be approached via private vessels.

== See also ==
- List of islands of England
- Poole Harbour
- Holes Bay
