= Redhorn Quay Wreck =

Wreck of a WWII vessel in Dorset, England

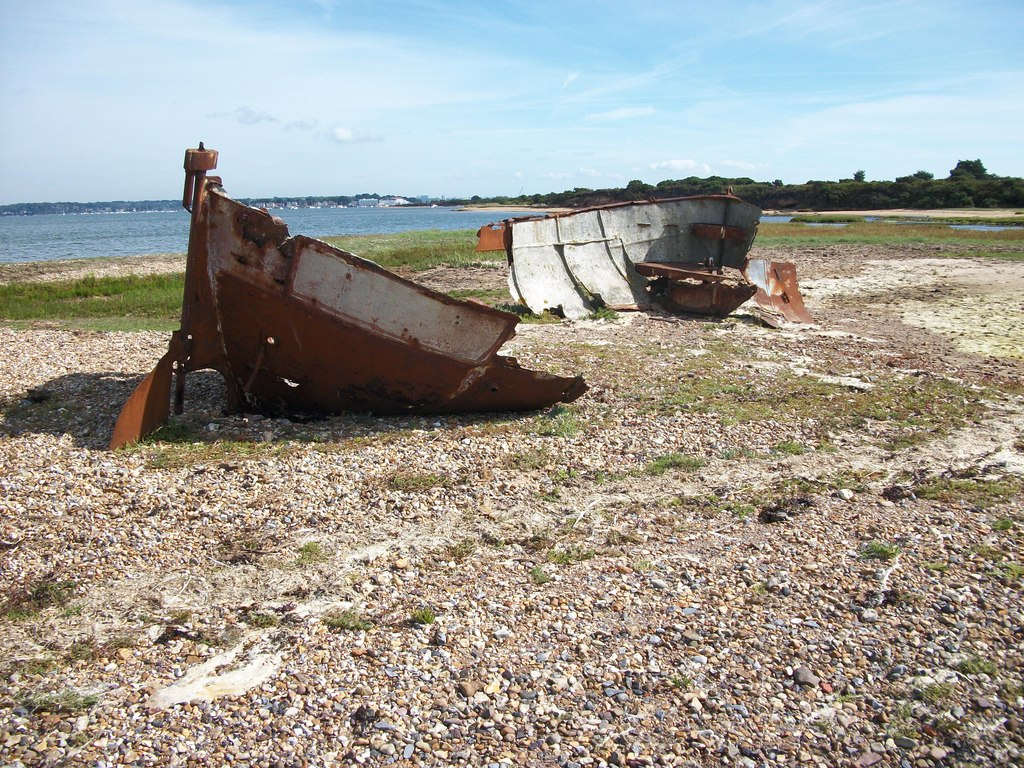
- The Redhorn Quay Wreck in 2010

History

United Kingdom
- Name: Redhorn Quay Wreck
- Namesake: Redhorn Quay
- Owner: Ministry of War Transport
- Operator: Royal Navy
- Launched: 1940–1945
- Acquired: 1945
- In service: 1940-1945
- Out of service: 15 October 1987
- Fate: Wrecked at Redhorn Quay, Poole Harbour, Dorset possibly during the Great Storm of 1987, 50.668983°N 1.970232°W

General characteristics
- Type: Lifeboat
- Decks: 1
- Installed power: 1 × internal combustion engine
- Propulsion: 1 × screw propeller; 1 × prop shaft

The Redhorn Quay Wreck is the remains of a World War II lifeboat wrecked on the beaches of Redhorn Quay in Poole Harbour, Dorset, England. It is located within the parish of Studland.

== History ==
The vessel was originally built during World War II as a specialised “lead lifeboat” for the Ministry of War Transport. The vessel acted as a small tug, pulling unpowered lifeboats away from hazards. After the war ended in 1945, the huge surplus of military and auxiliary lifeboats was sold to the British public.

=== Post-war ===
The fate of the vessel after the war is unclear. The most widely accepted theory is that the vessel was purchased by a consortium of local fishermen who intended to make it watertight to use as a club fishing trawler using fibreglass, which can still be found in the wreck today. After this failed, the wreck was left abandoned at the site of what was once a wooden jetty crossing Poole Harbour to nearby Brownsea Island, which, at the time, had a booming pottery and clay industry. Another theory states that the vessel was beached at Redhorn Quay during the Great Storm of 1987.

Additionally, a local squatter used the hull as a seasonal shelter during the summer months of the 1960s. He fished and launched a boat from the reeds, leaving the remains of his tether post on the bramble-covered side of the headland. He was eventually forced to leave by rising tides and local authorities.

=== Present day ===
Today, the wreck of the vessel remains at Redhorn Quay. It is currently disappearing rapidly and there is now little left of the vessel. Despite this, buried underneath the gravel of the wreck, there is a prop shaft, implying that the vessel once had an engine.

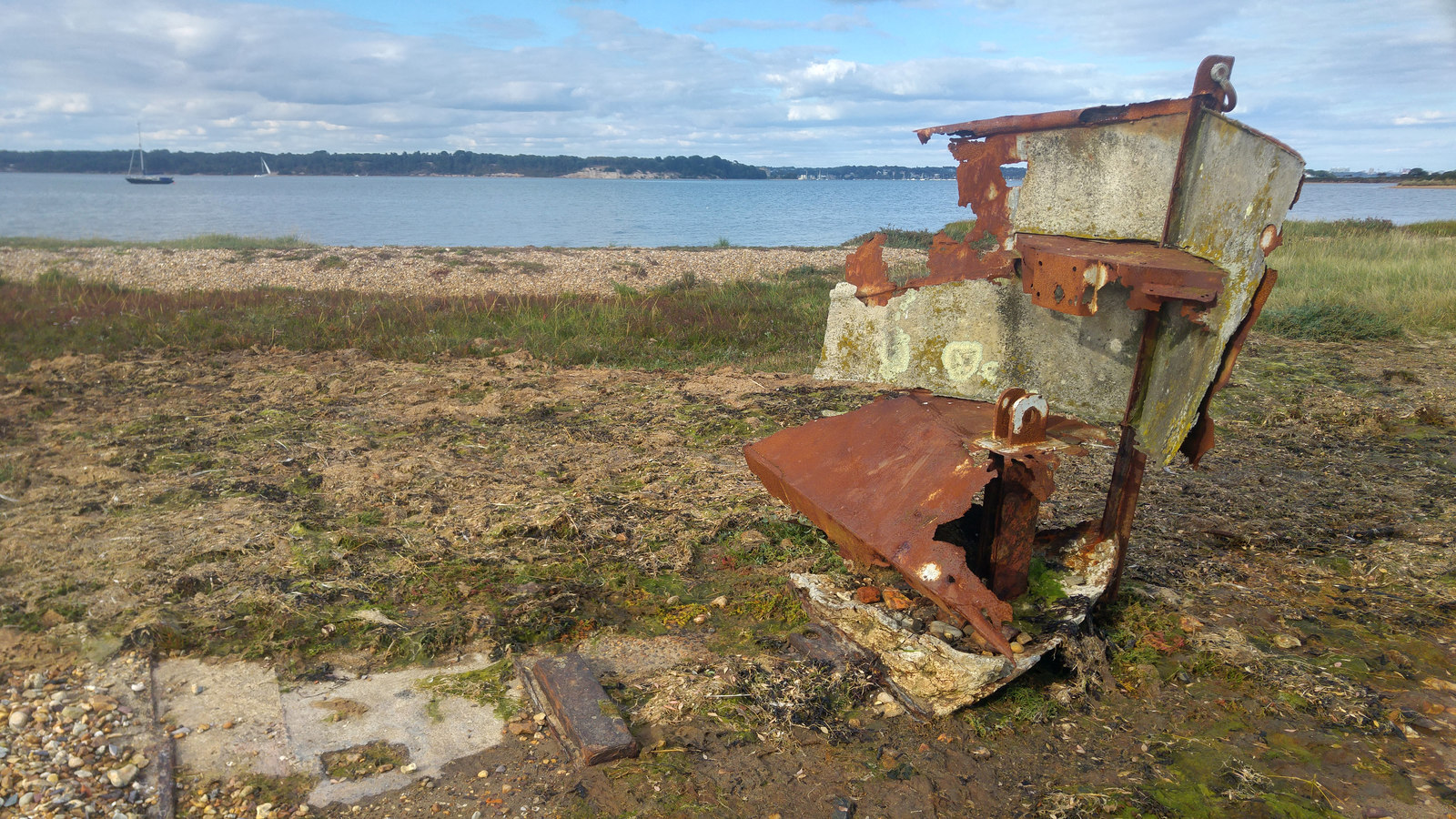
The wreck of the vessel in 2018. It is now rapidly disappearing.

The wreck is unprotected but remains a popular spot for photographers.

== See also ==
- Poole Harbour
- List of islands in Poole Harbour
- PH294
