= Baiter Park =

Waterfront area of Poole, England

Coordinates: 50.71347600829721°N 1.970210696434481°W

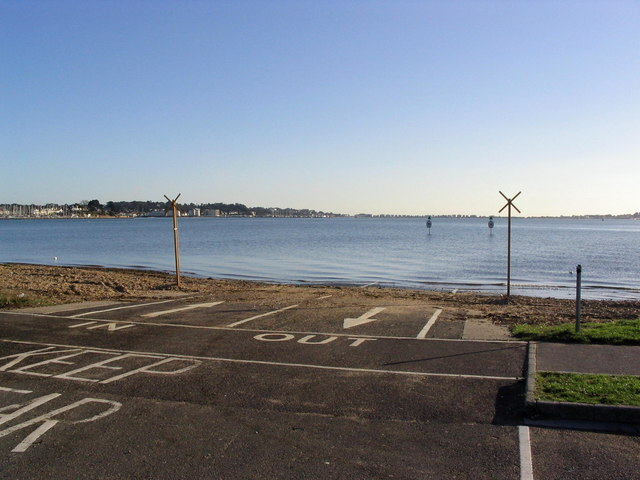
The slipway at Baiter Park, Poole.

Baiter Park is a waterfront area of Poole, Dorset. Baiter Park is part of Harbourside Park along with Whitecliff Park. The park is bordered to the north by Labrador Drive and Catalina Drive and to the south by the edge of Poole Harbour and Parkstone Bay. Baiter Park is to the east of Poole Town Centre.

The Port of Poole can be seen across the water.

== History ==
The park is built on recently reclaimed land, recovered from Poole Harbour

In 2018, residents were asked about a proposed £160,000 project to renovate Baiter and Whitecliff Park. In 2019, improvements were announced by Bournemouth, Christchurch and Poole Council.
