= Whitecliff =

Area in England

Coordinates: 50.718°N 1.951°W

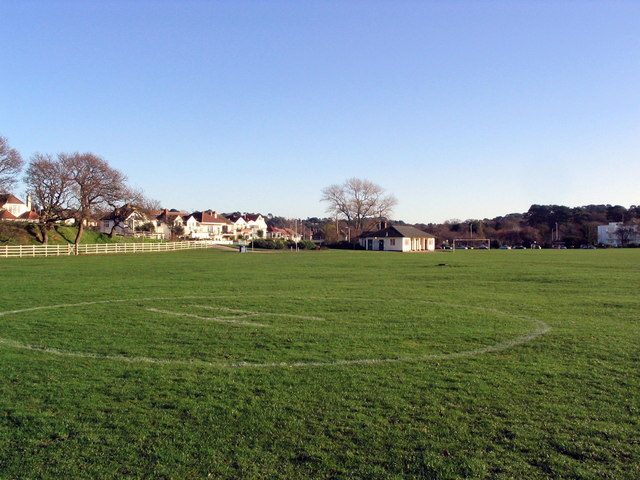
Whitecliff Park

Whitecliff, is a small area of Parkstone in Poole, Dorset, England. It is situated near the eastern shore of Poole Harbour and is a very sought-after residential district of Poole due to its park and harbour view.

== Whitecliff Park ==
Whitecliff Park or Whitecliff Recreation Ground (part of Poole's Harbourside Park) offers a cricket pitch used by various local teams including, those from Poole Cricket Club. Whitecliff is also home to several local football teams ranging from youth to amateur football. The park borders on Baiter Park to the west.

In 2009 a much improved children's play area was opened to the public.

== Politics ==
Whitecliff is part of the Poole parliamentary constituency.
