= Otter Island (Poole) =

Island in Poole Harbour, Dorset

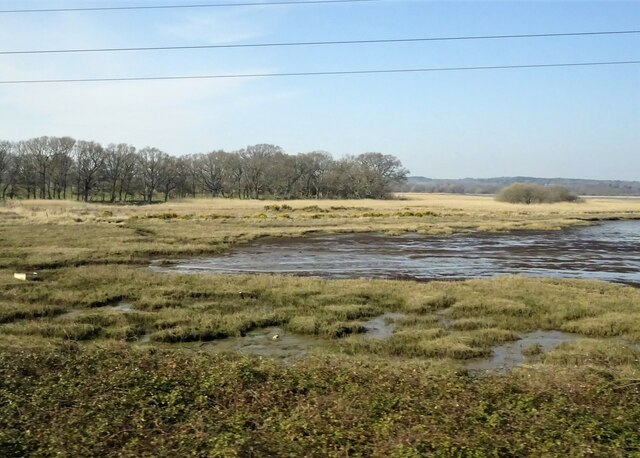
- On-island perspective of Otter Island, separated from the mainland by a narrow channel of water
- Interactive map of Otter Island

Geography
- Location: Lytchett Bay, Poole Harbour, Dorset
- Coordinates: 50.7245°N 2.0454°W

Administration
- England

Demographics
- Population: 0

Additional information
- Local authority – Bournemouth, Christchurch and Poole; No public access

Otter Island is an uninhabited islet located within Lytchett Bay, Poole Harbour, in Dorset, England, where Rock Lea River flows into the harbour. It consists of saltmarsh and reeds, and is separated from the mainland only by shallow water.

The island is privately owned with no public access.

== Ecology ==
Though small in size, Otter Island has come to act as a vital ecological marker within the Lytchett Bay nature reserves. The Birds of Poole Harbour charity often utilizes the island as a geographical marker for monitoring bird activity. White-tailed eagles, Marsh harriers, Eurasian bitterns and Black-headed gulls can be observed on the island.

The island is in Unit 27 ("Lychett Bay West") of the Poole Harbour SSSI. In 2020, the biological condition of the unit was "Favourable" but by 2020 had declined to "Unfavourable – Declining". This was attributed to the impact of an elevated level of nitrogen enrichment, with effects including the excess growth of algae and reductions in eelgrass/seawrack (Zostera marina), dwarf eelgrass (Zostera noltii) and – previously abundant – beaked tasselweed (Ruppia maritima). The extent of salt marsh and, with the exception of shelduck, the abundance of bird life, was more stable, though the saltmarsh was suffering from increased reed growth.

== Access ==
Whereas earlier landowners allowed the public access to the area's mudflats and channels, there is now no public access to the island. There was a proposal for establishing a public Right of Way to Otter Island in a 2009 legal application, but it was dismissed. Consequently, the islet cannot legally be accessed by the public and can only be approached via private vessels.

== See also ==
- List of islands of England
- Poole Harbour
- Pergins Island
