= Corfe Castle (village) =

Village and civil parish in Dorset, England

Coordinates: 50°38′19″N 2°03′26″W

- Village and civil parish
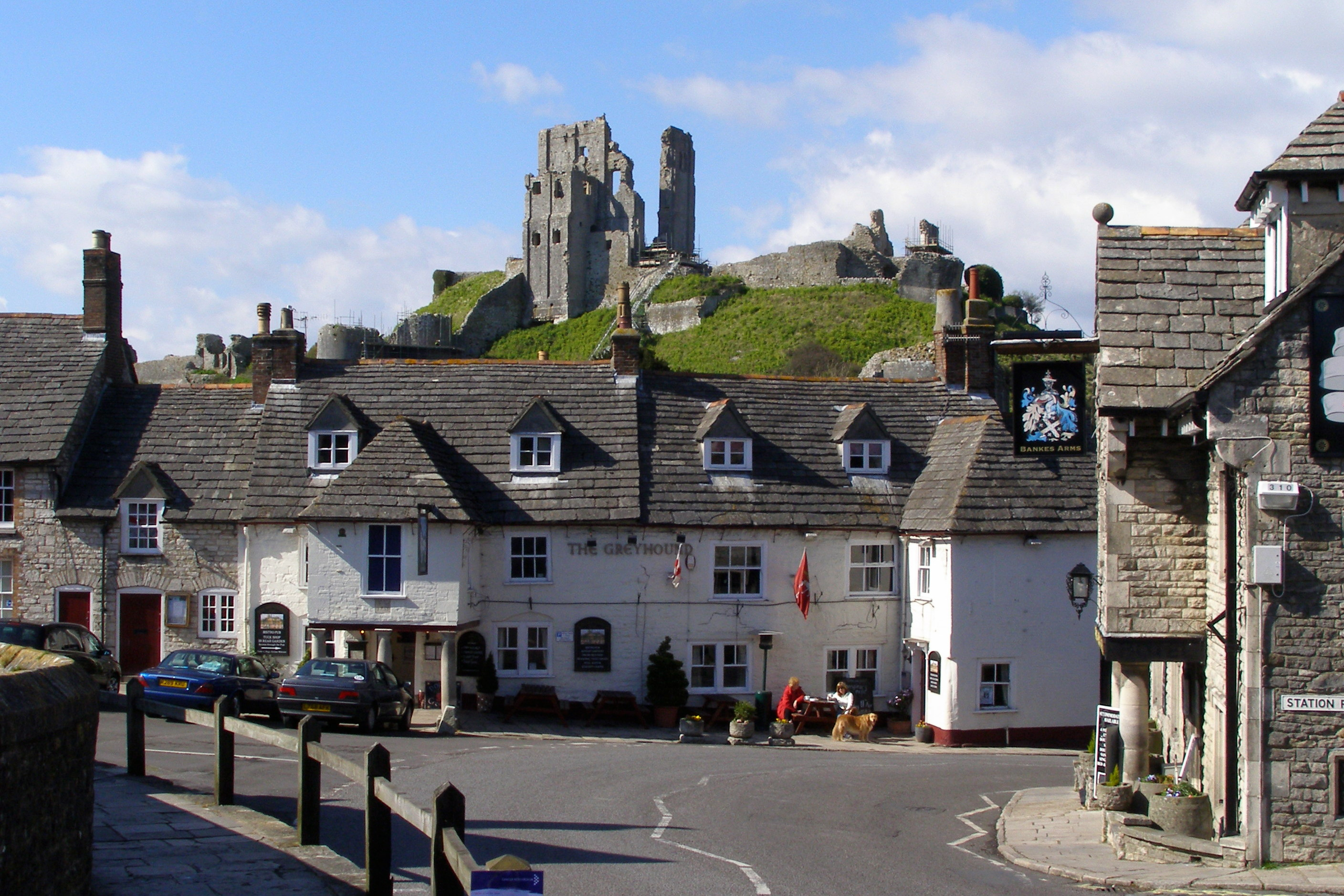
- Corfe Castle

- Location within Dorset
- Area: 14.5 sq mi (38 km^{2})
- Population: 1,284 (2021 census)
  - Density: 89/sq mi (34/km^{2})
- OS grid reference: SY957823
- Civil parish: Corfe Castle
- Unitary authority: Dorset
- Ceremonial county: Dorset
- Region: South West
- Country: England
- Sovereign state: United Kingdom
- Post town: Wareham
- Postcode district: BH20
- Dialling code: 01929
- Police: Dorset
- Fire: Dorset and Wiltshire
- Ambulance: South Western
- UK Parliament: South Dorset

Corfe Castle is a village and civil parish in the English county of Dorset. It is the site of a ruined castle of the same name. The village and castle stand over a gap in the Purbeck Hills on the route between Wareham and Swanage. The village lies in the gap below the castle and is around four miles (6.4 km) south-east of Wareham, and four miles (6.4 km) north-northwest of Swanage. Both the main A351 road from Lytchett Minster to Swanage and the Swanage Railway thread their way through the gap and the village.

The civil parish of Corfe Castle stretches across the width of the Isle of Purbeck, with coasts facing both the English Channel and Poole Harbour. It, therefore, includes sections of both the low-lying sandy heathland that lies to the north of the castle and the rugged Jurassic Coast upland to the south.

== Toponymy ==
The name "Corfe" is derived from the Old English word, ceorfan, meaning to cut or carve, referring to the gap in the Purbeck hills where Corfe Castle is situated.

== History ==
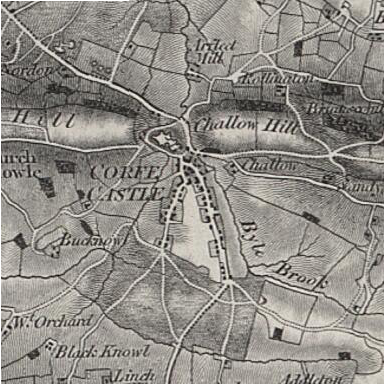
Ordnance Survey map of Corfe Castle in 1856, showing the castle and village in the gap of the Purbeck Hills

Burial mounds around Corfe Common to the south of Corfe Castle suggest that the area was occupied from 6000 BC. The common also points to a later Celtic field system worked by the Durotriges tribe. Evidence suggests that the tribe co-existed with the Romans in a trading relationship following the Roman invasion c. 50 AD.

King Edward the Martyr was murdered in Corfe on the evening of 18 March 978.

In the Middle Ages there was a considerable marble carving and stone cutting industry in the village. Purbeck stone was shipped all round the country from Ower Quay in Poole harbour.

In the 18th century, ball clay quarrying developed as an industry in the village. By the middle of the century, with the arrival of William Pike – a merchant from Devon, activity expanded significantly. In 1791 Pike signed a five-year contract with Josiah Wedgwood to supply 1,200 tons of clay and search for further deposits. From the 1796 Corfe Castle census of the 96 men involved in local industries and living in the town, 55 were clay cutters. Clay extraction continued to provide major employment for the local population until the 20th century.

The village had two watermills, West Mill on the River Wicken ceased operating in 1792 but the building was used for poor housing until 1915. Stone from the building was used to construct the World War 1 war memorial. The other mill was Boar Mill on the Byle Brook. The mill cottage was later used as a bakery. The grade II listed mill and cottage are now owned by the National Trust.

== Geography ==
The parish of Corfe Castle encompasses a broad swathe of the Isle of Purbeck and has an area of 14 1/2 square miles (37.45 km^{2}). To the south, it includes the smaller village of Kingston and a section of the Jurassic Coast facing the English Channel. To the north, it includes a large area of heathland stretching as far as the southern shore of Poole Harbour, where Furzey, Green, Long and Round little islands also form part of the parish. To the north west on a clear day, the Mendip Hills in Somerset can be seen in the distance from the castle. The village is constructed almost entirely from the local grey Purbeck limestone and comprises two main streets, East Street and West Street, linked at their north end at the Square.

== Landmarks ==
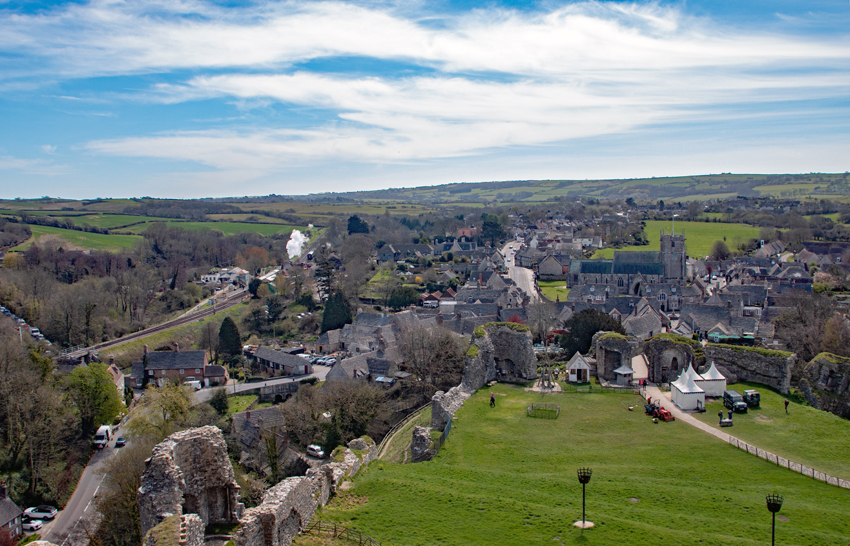
The village, as seen from the castle

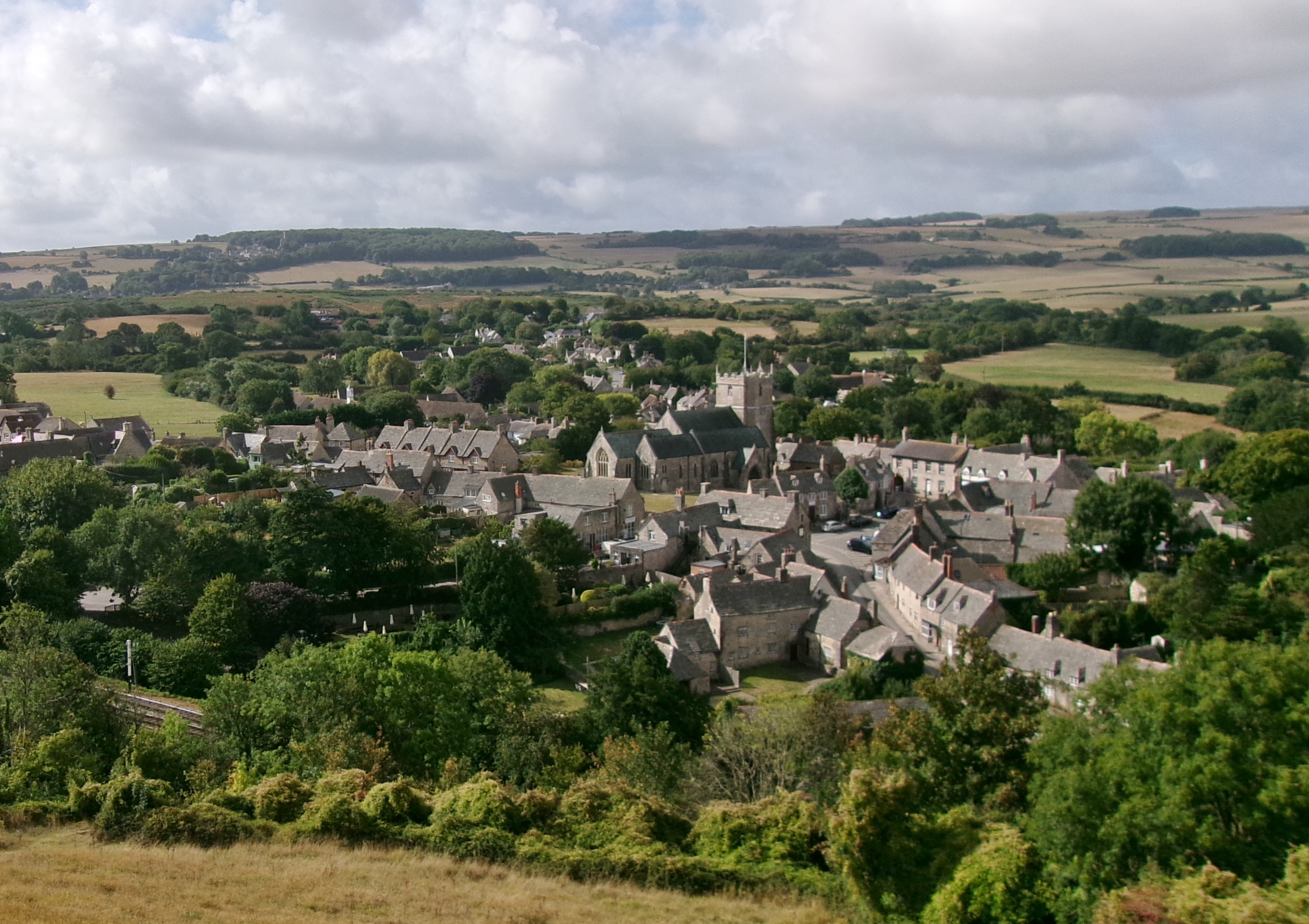
View of the village from East Hill

The National Trust runs a shop and a tearoom in the village, both are grade II listed buildings. The Corfe Model Village, located on the village square, is a 1/20 scale model that shows what the castle and village would have looked like in 1646 before the castle was slighted. Within the Church of St. Edward is an alabaster reredos inset with carvings in white marble, designed by the famous Victorian architect George Edmund Street R.A., which was presented by Lord Eldon in 1876. A cross in the square commemorates Queen Victoria's Diamond Jubilee of 1897. Next to the cross is a defunct village pump, bearing the village's arms. Mortons House Hotel, a grade II* listed building, was built in 1590 and is one of the most notable buildings in the village. Corfe Castle Town Hall, also grade II listed, in West Street, was built in around 1774.

== Corfe Castle ==
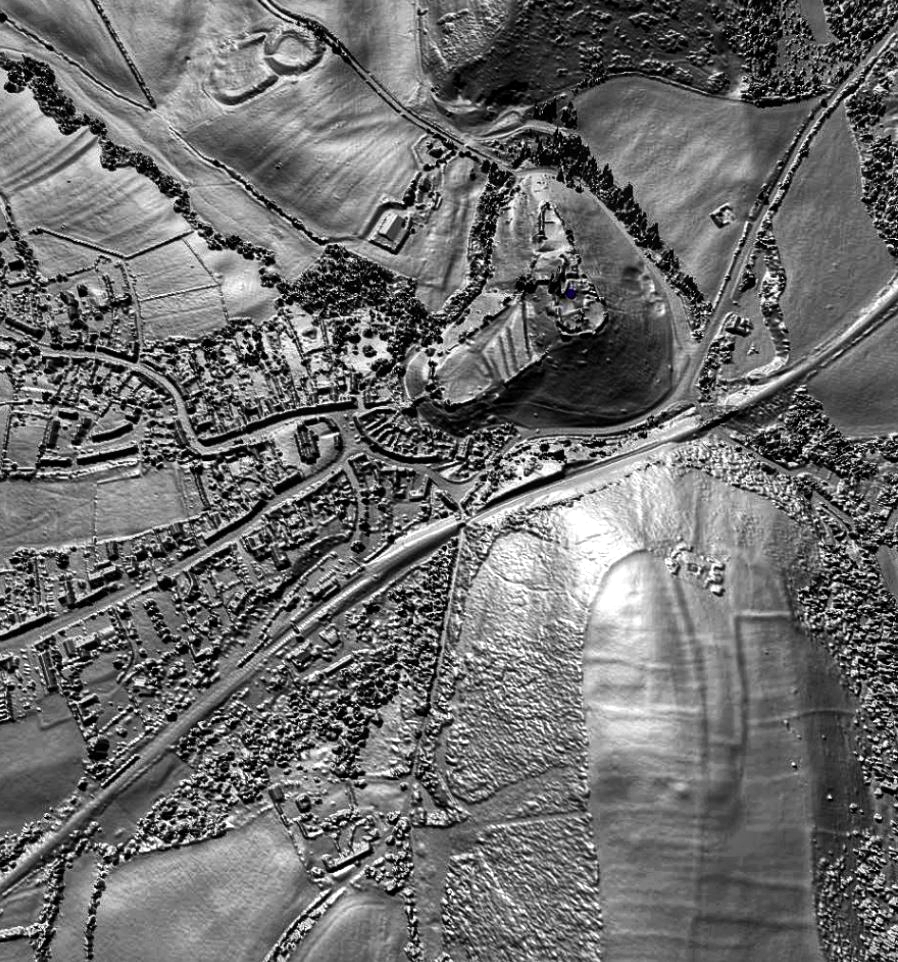
A lidar view of Challow Hill Bronze Age round barrow, Corfe Castle and The Rings Medieval ring and bailey earthworks

The castle stands above the village and dates back in some form to the 10th century. It was the site of the murder of Edward the Martyr in 978. During the English Civil War it was a Royalist stronghold and was besieged twice, in 1643 and again in 1646. It is currently owned by the National Trust and is open to the public.

== Governance ==
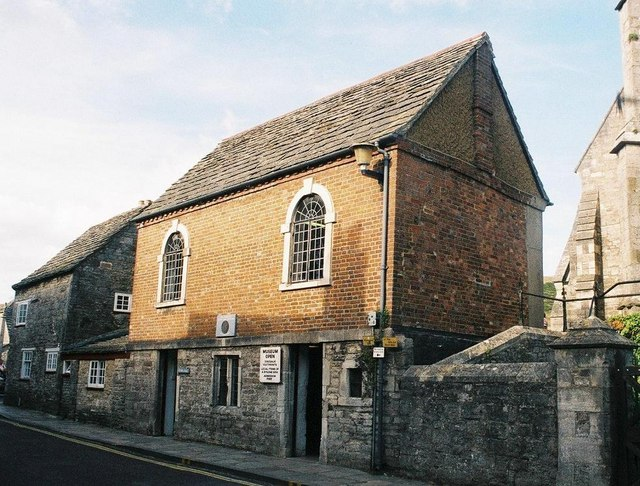
Corfe Castle Town Hall

The former royal status of Corfe meant that it existed as a borough electing two Members of Parliament (MPs). In the 17th and 18th centuries, with the Bankes's owning much of the property and thereby controlling most of the votes, the town was a rotten borough. The Bankes family was able to ensure that at least one of the MPs returned to the unreformed House of Commons was a member of the family or a Bankes nominee. The Reform Act 1832 abolished the rotten boroughs, and Corfe lost its direct representation. The village and castle were part of Corfe Castle hundred.

The parish later formed part of the District of Purbeck. It is within the South Dorset constituency of the House of Commons. Before Brexit in 2020, it was in the South West England constituency of the European Parliament.

After 2019 structural changes to local government in England, Corfe Castle is part of the South East Purbeck ward which elects 1 member to Dorset Council.

== Demography ==
At the 2021 census, the civil parish had a population of 1,284 people in 588 households.

Census population of Corfe Castle parish
Census	Population	Female	Male	Households	Source
1921	1,402				
1931	1,409				
1951	1,370				
1961	1,381				
1971	1,290				
1981	1,350				
1991	1,320				
2001	1,429	731	698	637	
2011	1,355	691	664	612	
2021	1,284	658	626	588	

== Transport ==
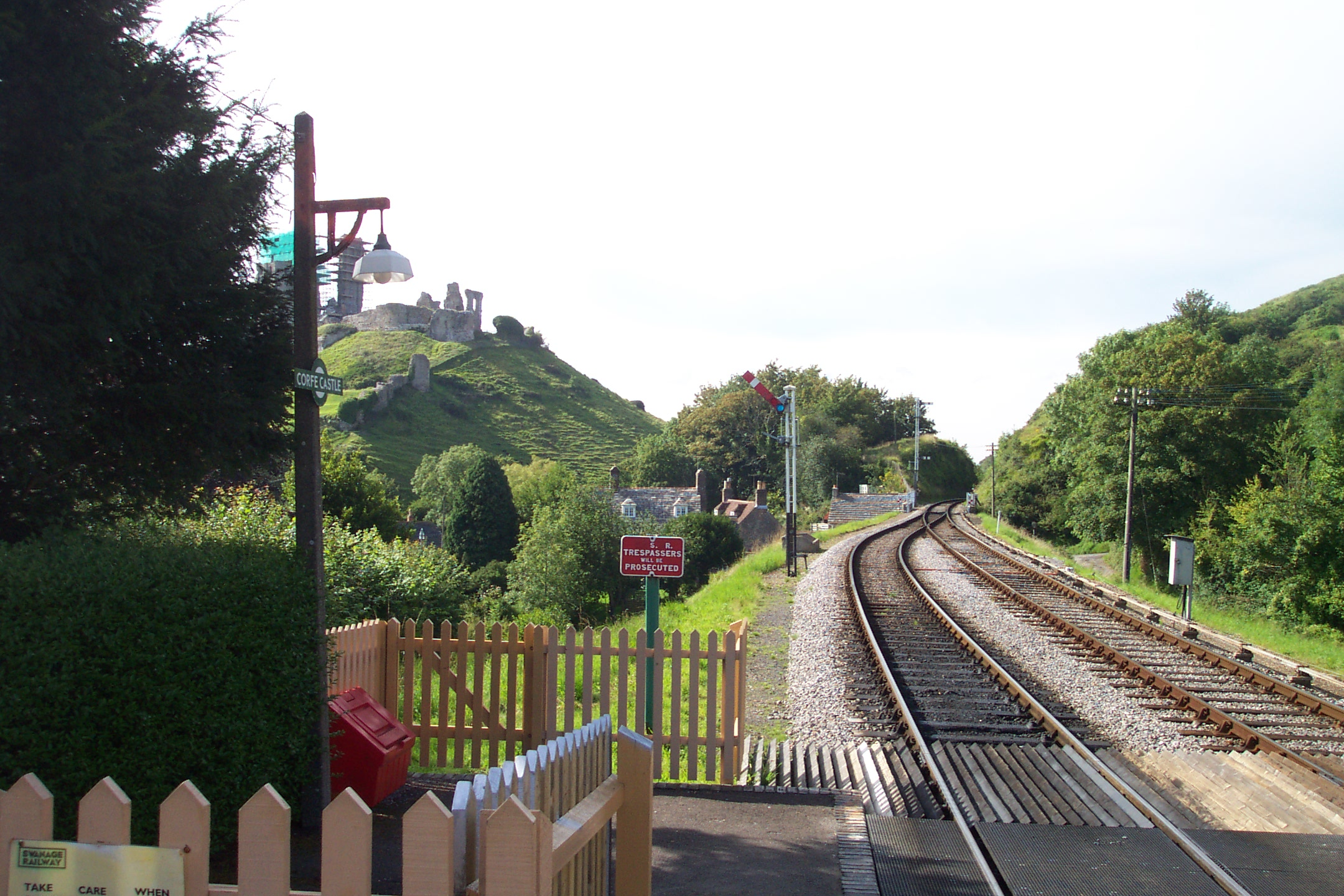
The railway line, showing the gap the line must thread between Castle (left) and East (right) hills.

The main route through the village is East Street which forms part of the A351 main road taking traffic to Wareham in the north and Swanage in the south. Separating the two streets is an area of common land called "the Halves".

Corfe Castle railway station lies to the east of East Street, adjacent to the village centre. Originally the only intermediate station on the London and South Western Railway's branch line from Wareham to Swanage, the station is now a stop on the Swanage Railway, a steam locomotive operated heritage railway. The railway links the tourist centres of Corfe Castle and Swanage with each other, and with a Park and Ride site at Norden station just to the north of Corfe Castle. On some days, diesel trains also run to Wareham, where they connect with National Rail services to London, Southampton, Bournemouth and Weymouth.

== Notable residents ==
The village was for many years the residence of composer Kaikhosru Shapurji Sorabji.

== Cultural references ==
Keith Roberts, an English science fiction writer who lived nearby, set his alternative history novel Pavane partly around the castle.

The children's author Enid Blyton spent time in the area, and some of her adventure stories like The Famous Five (Kirrin Island) featured castles that were said to be based on Corfe Castle. In 1957 the Children's Film Foundation (CFF) film "Five on a Treasure Island" was filmed in and around Corfe Castle, Corfe Castle Village and the Jurassic Coast (Durdle Door and Stairhole at Lulworth Cove).

Corfe was featured in the 1971 film Bedknobs and Broomsticks released by The Walt Disney Company, doubling as the fictional village of Pepperinge Eye.

The Castle itself and the Greyhound Inn feature prominently in Mike Leigh's 1976 TV play Nuts in May. The two main characters, Keith and Candice-Marie, pay a visit to the castle during their camping holiday.

The back of Corfe Castle plus Oliver's Bistro in Corfe Castle Village are featured in the German TV thriller At the End of the Silence based on the novel by Charlotte Link.

An episode of Mary Queen of Shops centred on Mary Portas revamping the village's convenience store.

Featured in the time-slip novel, The Lady of Hay by Barbara Erskine.

== See also ==
- Scoles Manor
- The Shrove Tuesday Football Ceremony of the Purbeck Marblers
- National Trust Properties in England
