= Sherford =

Sherford may refer to the following places in England:

- Sherford (new town), in Devon
- Sherford (near Kingsbridge), a village in Devon
- Sherford, Dorset, a location
- Sherford, Somerset, an area of Taunton
- the River Sherford, in Dorset
