= Shrove Tuesday Football Ceremony of the Purbeck Marblers =

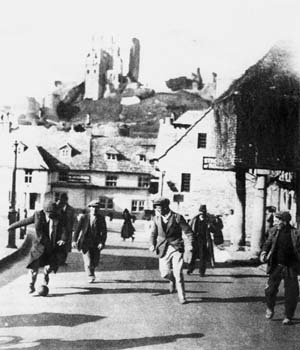
Shrove Tuesday Football Ceremony of the Purbeck Marblers

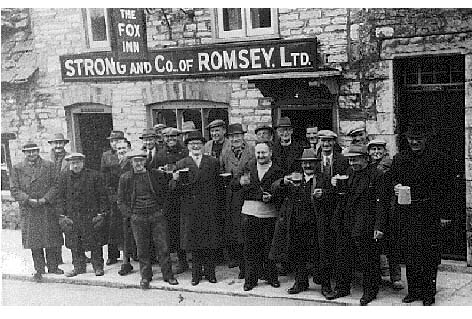
22 members of the Order with their chaplain, the Rector of Corfe Castle on Shrove Tuesday, 1935. In the background is the Fox Inn.

The Shrove Tuesday Football Ceremony of the Purbeck Marblers is a series of events dating back many years which take place in Corfe Castle, Dorset. The events occur on the date that new apprentices are introduced to the Company of Marblers and Stonecutters of Purbeck. The freemen gather in the Fox Inn West Street where they wait till Corfe Church chimes at twelve noon, where they make their way into the Town Hall, which is reputedly the smallest town hall in the country. Any apprentices wishing to be admitted into the order wait in the Fox Inn.

In the town hall names of attendance are taken, apologies are made on behalf of the absent, the minutes of the last annual general meeting are read and any new apprentices wishing to become freemen of the order, that fit the necessary criteria, are nominated and seconded, after which a vote is taken to decide if each of the applicants are accepted. From the Fox Inn, the successful apprentices are called to the Town Hall with a quart of beer and a penny loaf to pay their "dues", then successful applicants are welcomed as freemen of the order, after which a closed ceremony is held for the company.

A photo taken in 1935 shows 22 members of the company with their chaplain, the rector of Corfe Castle, on Shrove Tuesday, 1935. In the background is the Fox Inn.

From Corfe, marble was carted the three miles across Rempstone Heath to Ower Quay on Poole harbour, a timber wharf deserted today with a few weathered blocks of marble left from the past. Their annual gathering and elections are held at the Town Hall, Corfe, on Shrove Tuesday and one custom is to kick a football round the boundary of Corfe. The ball is never touched by hand and is just trundled along. The route is followed in order to preserve the old right of way along which the quarried stone was transported. Finally, at Ower farm, a pound of pepper is delivered to the occupants of the farm by the new apprentices or most junior freemen as rent for the tolling rights to the quay. A section of the track is known as Peppercorn Lane.

An article published in Dorset Life claimed the following:

"Outrage! In 1992 a young police constable, on temporary secondment from the North of England and ignorant of the 700-year-old Shrove Tuesday custom, confiscated the football which the company of Purbeck Marblers and Stone-cutters were kicking through the streets of Corfe Castle."
