= Long Island (Dorset) =

Island off the Dorset coast of England

Coordinates: 50.6906°N 2.0176°W

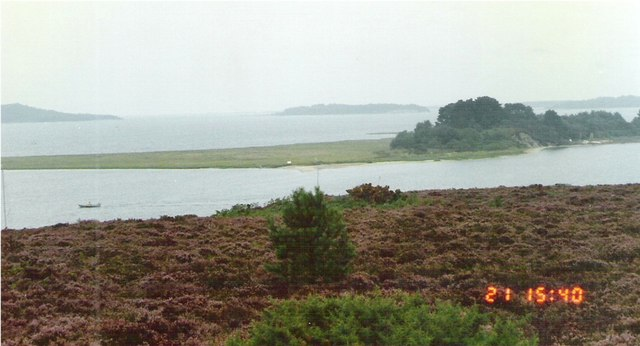
- Long Island viewed from the western shore of Poole Harbour

- Location within Dorset
- Area: 0.042 km^{2} (0.016 sq mi)
- OS grid reference: SY987879
- Civil parish: Corfe Castle
- Unitary authority: Dorset
- Ceremonial county: Dorset
- Region: South West
- Country: England
- Sovereign state: United Kingdom
- Police: Dorset
- Fire: Dorset and Wiltshire
- Ambulance: South Western
- UK Parliament: South Dorset

Long Island is an uninhabited island in Poole Harbour in the English county of Dorset. It lies just off the shore of the Arne Peninsular in the south-west of the harbour, and is separated from the nearby, and inhabited, Round Island by a narrow channel only a few feet wide. The island covers approximately 30 acres at low tide, reducing to only 9.5 acres (38,000 m^{2}) at high tide. Long Island lies within the civil parish of Corfe Castle. The parish forms part of the Dorset unitary authority area.

Long Island had been privately owned by the Rempstone Estate for over 250 years but in 2007 it was closed to the public and put up for sale with offers invited in excess of £1 million. The sale was initially delayed by a rights of way application made by pleasure boat owners who feared the new landlords would deny public access to the island. However the application was dismissed by Dorset County Council in 2009 and the island was sold in 2010 for an estimated £3 million to a local property developer.

1955 the island was leased by Guy Sydenham who used clay from the island to make Pottery. By 1968 he had moved to Green Island.

On 24 August 1943, a Royal Air Force Consolidated Catalina (FP287) was on a training flight & was landing at Poole Seaplane Base. The aircraft overshot the landing path during the second flare then attempted a go-ground, soon after crashed into sea next to the island. Eight of the twelve crew died in the crash.
