= Scoles Manor =

House in Corfe Castle, Dorset, England

Coordinates: 50°37′9.39″N 2°3′9.35″W

Scoles Manor, also known as Scoles Farm House, is former farmhouse and a Grade II* listed building, two miles from Corfe Castle in Dorset, England. It is believed to be the oldest continuously occupied building in Corfe Castle parish. The main part of the house was built in 1635 and there is a medieval structure attached which has been dated to 1280 and which was either a chapel or a small hall house.

The name Scoles is derived from the family called Scoville or Scovil who originally came from the village of Escoville in Normandy. There are records of Scovilles living here in the 13th and 14th centuries but the property was then passed to their female descendants (including Dacombes and Colsons) before being bought in c. 1810 by John Scott, 1st Earl of Eldon.

== Owners and residents ==
John de Scoville appears to have bought the property. A record exists which states that the land was transferred between Jordan and Amicia Belejambe to John de Scoville in 1254. It then descended in the Scoville family until it came to Robert Scoville in about 1380. As he had no male heirs it was inherited by his daughter Beatrix who married Peter Clavell of Quarr in about 1400. The property then passed down the Clavell family until it came to Richard Clavell. He left it to his daughter Elizabeth who married Thomas Dacombe (or Dackombe) in about 1508.

It was the Dacombe family who built the main part of Scoles Farm in the 17th Century. According to the local historian Reverend Grosvenor Bartelot it was Edward Dacombe (1579-1635) who was the originator. He was a member of parliament and mayor of Corfe Castle. He married twice. His first wife was Susan Turner whom he married in 1603. They had two children Robert Dacombe (1608-1663) and Mary Dacombe (1607-1682). When he died in 1635 Edward left Scoles Farm to his eldest son Robert who is recorded as living at the property until his death in 1663. When he died in 1663 he left it to his sister Mary who in turn left it to her nephew Edward Dacombe (1642-1883). When Edward died in 1883 he left the property to his son Henry Dacombe (b. 1672). In about 1700 Henry sold Scoles Farm to John Morton who was the grandson of Mary Dacombe.

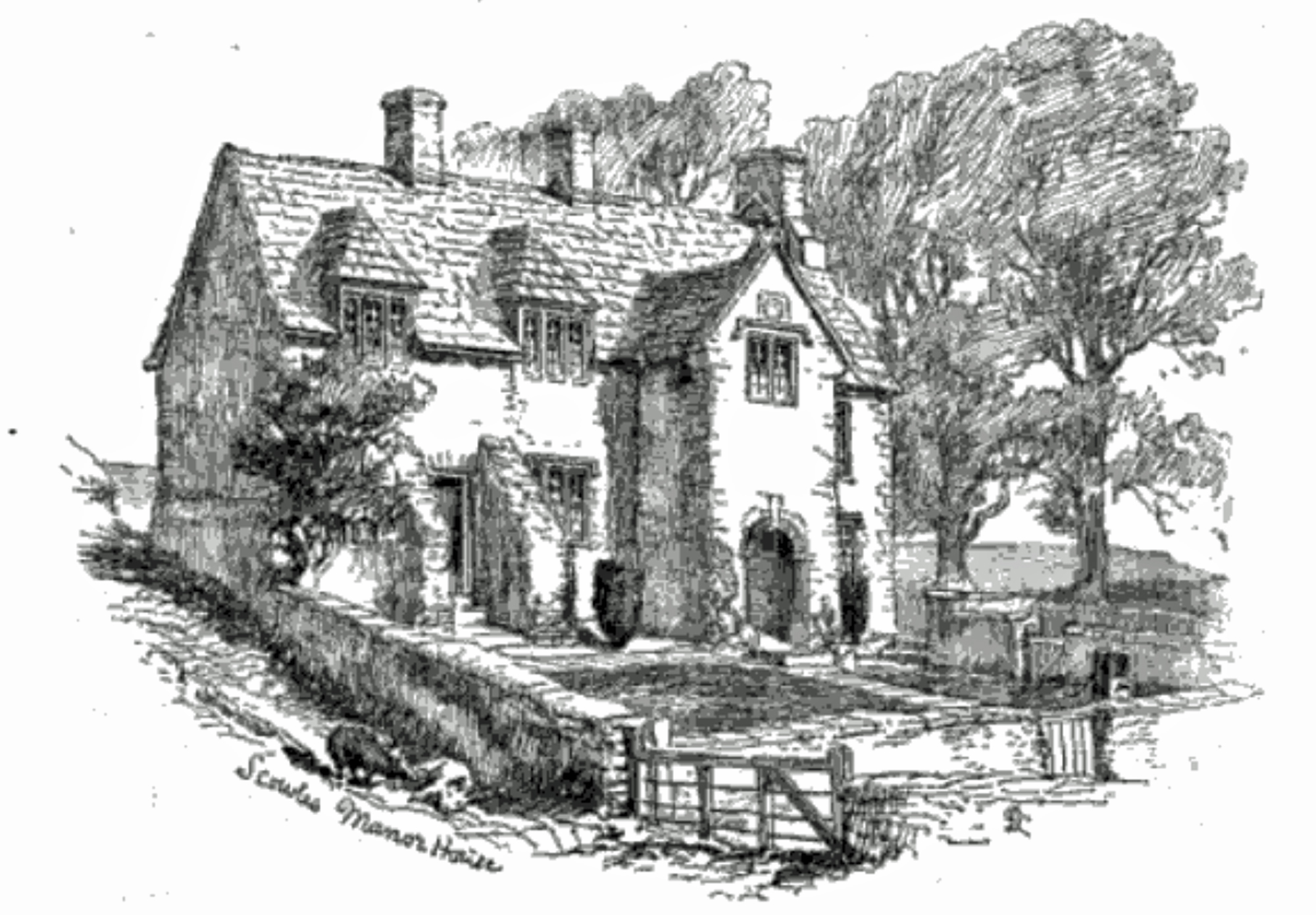
Drawing of Scoles Manor in 1882

John Morton (1677-1750) left his property to his nephew the Reverend John Colson (1701-1769) when he died in 1750. Colson was unmarried so when he died in 1769 he left his estate to his spinster sister Sarah Colson (1705-1772) with the provision that on her death it was to go to his younger brother Reverend Thomas Colson (1716-1784).When Thomas died in 1784 he left his property to his son Reverend John Morton Colson (1762-1837). In 1792 John sold it to William Morton Pitt.

William Morton Pitt (1754-1836) was a member of parliament. In 1787 when his father died William inherited Encombe House so after he bought Scoles farm it became part of the Encombe Estate. In 1807 he sold the whole Estate including Scoles Farm to Lord Eldon.

John Scott, 1st Earl of Eldon (1751-1838) made Encombe House the family seat and it was passed through several generations. Scoles Farm was occupied by tenant farmers. In 1882 a book was published entitled "Picturesque Rambles in the Isle of Purbeck" in which a drawing was made of Scoles Manor with a detailed description of the property. The drawing is shown.
