= Corfe River =

River in Dorset, England

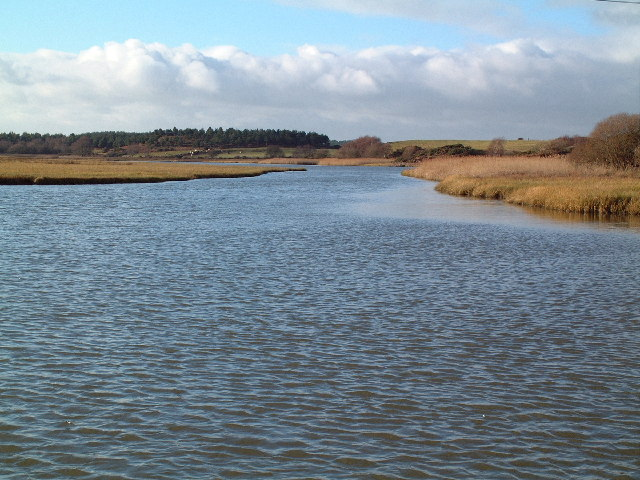
- Mouth of Corfe River at Wych Lake

Physical characteristics
- Source
  - location: North Egliston, about 1.5 km W of Steeple, Isle of Purbeck
  - coordinates: 50.62510°N 2.12821°W
  - elevation: 85 m (279 ft)
- Mouth
  - location: Wych Lake, Poole Harbour
  - elevation: 0 m (0 ft)
- Length: 8.805 km (5.471 mi)
- Basin size: 33.922 km^{2} (13.097 sq mi)

The Corfe River is one of the four main rivers flowing into Poole Harbour in the county of Dorset, England. It is just under 9 km (6 mi) long.

== Name ==
The Saxon name for Corfe River was the Wichen; this survives in the names of Wytch Farm, Upper Wych Channel, Wytch Heath and Wytch, or Wych, Lake. Wichen may have derived from wics which meant "dairy farm", an indication that the area may not always have been heathland.

== Course ==
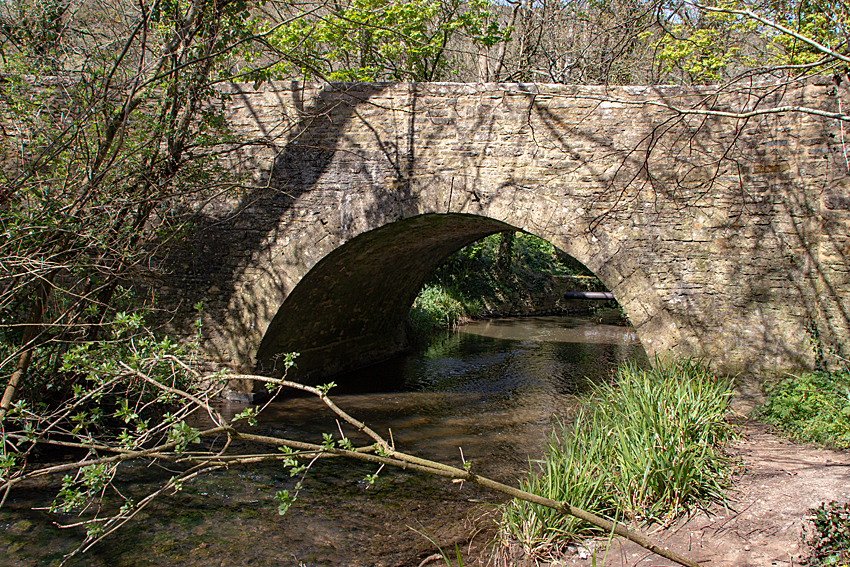
Listed footpath bridge over the Corfe

The Corfe River rises near North Egliston about 1.5 km (1 mi) west of the hamlet of Steeple, between the Purbeck Hills and the coastal ridge. The river initially flows eastwards towards Corfe Castle. Just before reaching the village it swings north-northeast through the gap in the Purbecks between West Hill and East Hill and continues across Wytch Heath before emptying into Wych (or Wytch) Lake on the southern side of Poole Harbour.

== Water quality ==
The Environment Agency measures the water quality of the river systems in England. Each is given an overall ecological status, which may be one of five levels: high, good, moderate, poor and bad. There are several components that are used to determine this, including biological status, which looks at the quantity and varieties of invertebrates, angiosperms and fish. Chemical status, which compares the concentrations of various chemicals against known safe concentrations, is rated good or fail.

Water quality of the Corfe River in 2019:

Section	Ecological Status	Chemical Status	Overall Status	Length	Catchment	Channel
Corfe River	Poor	Fail	Poor	8.805 km (5.471 mi)	33.922 km^{2} (13.097 sq mi)	
