= Harborside =

Harborside or Harbourside may refer to:

- Harborside, Maine
- Harborside (Jersey City), buildings in New Jersey, United States
  - Harborside (HBLR station)
- Harborside station (San Diego Trolley)
- Harbourside monorail station, Sydney, Australia
- Harborside Health Center, a cannabis dispensary with multiple locations in the San Francisco Bay Area
- The Harbourside, building in Hong Kong
- Harbourside Park, Poole, England
