= Harbourside Park =

Disambiguation for a place in England

Harbourside Park in Poole, Dorset, England has two components:

- Baiter Park
- Whitecliff Park

== See also ==
- Harborside (disambiguation)
