= Round Island (Dorset) =

Island in Dorset, England

Coordinates: 50.686125°N 2.016281°W

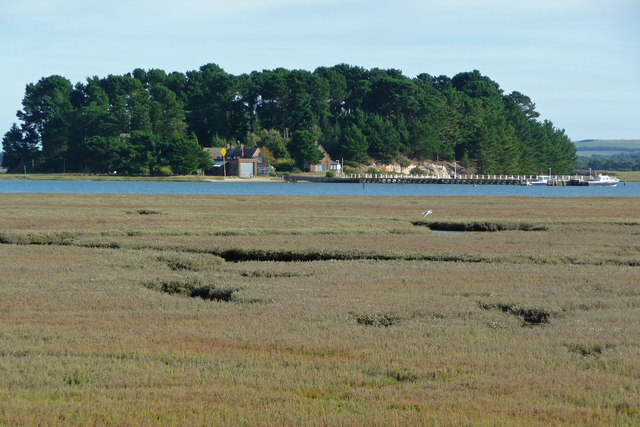
- Round Island viewed from the western shore of Poole Harbour

- Location within Dorset
- OS grid reference: SY988874
- Civil parish: Corfe Castle
- Unitary authority: Dorset
- Ceremonial county: Dorset
- Region: South West
- Country: England
- Sovereign state: United Kingdom
- Police: Dorset
- Fire: Dorset and Wiltshire
- Ambulance: South Western
- UK Parliament: South Dorset

Round Island is an island in Poole Harbour in the English county of Dorset. It lies just off the shore of the Arne Peninsula in the south-west of the harbour, and is separated from the nearby uninhabited Long Island by a narrow channel only a few feet wide.

The island is 15 acres in size, being a private property with a mix of grassy paddocks and woodland.

Round Island lies within the civil parish of Corfe Castle. The parish was formerly part of the Purbeck local government district,but now forms part of Dorset Council.
