= Furzey Island =

Island in Dorset, England

Coordinates: 50.682527°N 1.98372°W

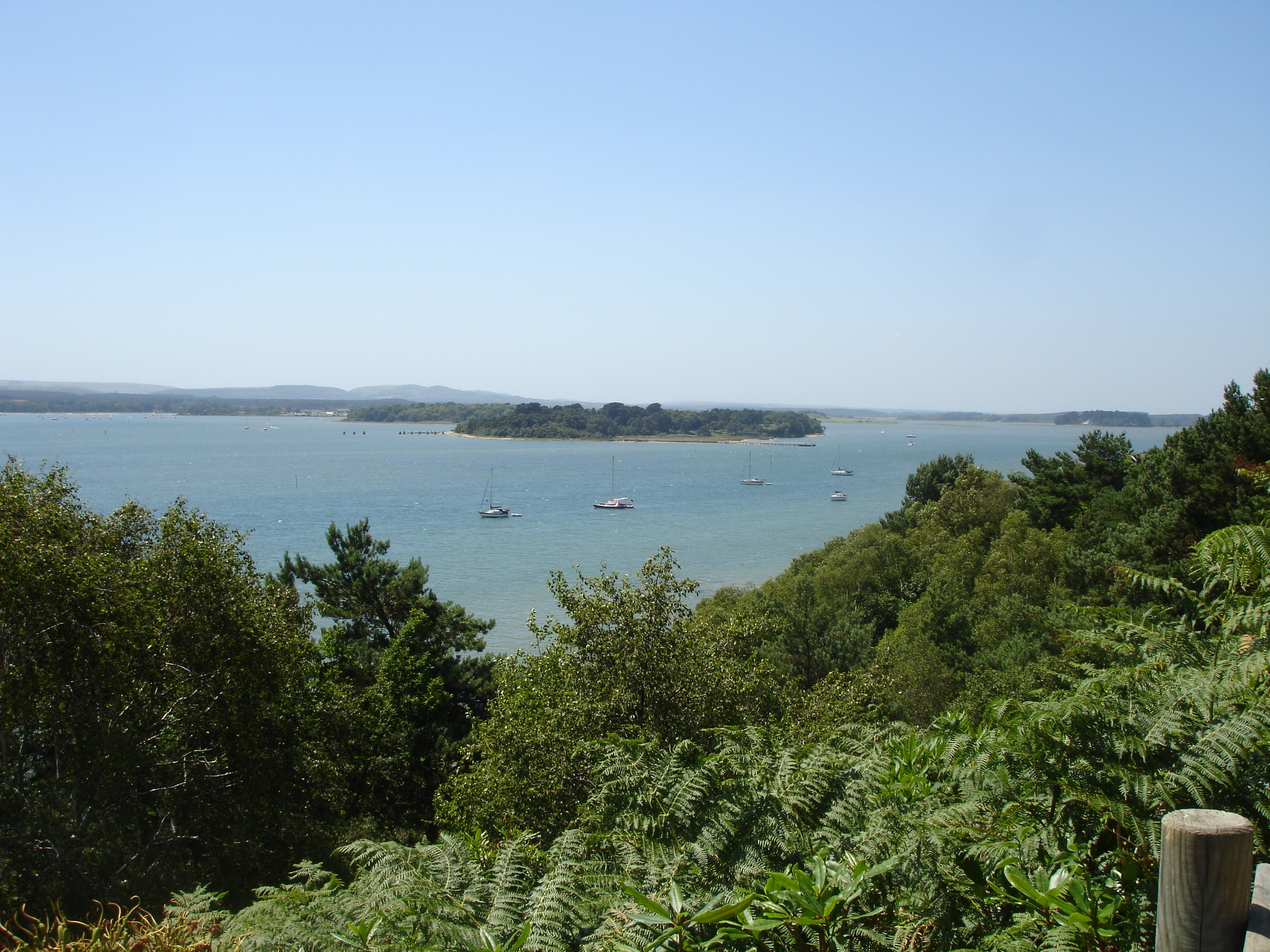
- Looking south-west from Brownsea Island; Furzey Island is centre, with Green Island directly behind it to the left

- Location within Dorset
- OS grid reference: SZ011870
- Civil parish: Corfe Castle
- Unitary authority: Dorset
- Ceremonial county: Dorset
- Region: South West
- Country: England
- Sovereign state: United Kingdom
- Police: Dorset
- Fire: Dorset and Wiltshire
- Ambulance: South Western
- UK Parliament: South Dorset

Furzey Island is an island in Poole Harbour, in the English county of Dorset; it lies to the south of the larger Brownsea Island. Seen from the water or adjoining land, it looks like another wild pineclad island; however, hidden in the trees are twenty-two oil wells split into two well-sites for the Wytch Farm Oil Field, which is linked by pipeline to Hamble on Southampton Water. The rarely seen tall oil rig can sometimes be a big landmark of Southern Poole Harbour and the main landmark between Brownsea and Furzey. The well-sites are staffed 24 hours a day.

Furzey Island lies within the civil parish of Corfe Castle, which forms part of the Dorset (formerly Purbeck) local government district.

== History ==
Furzey Island is believed to have been part of a much larger island around two thousand years ago, encompassing the entirety of Green Island. The name "Furzey" means "Furze island".

In February 2004, Channel 4's archaeological television programme Time Team found evidence of Iron Age commercial activity on Green Island. The remains of an Iron Age furnace were discovered, along with evidence of the production of shale jewellery. However, due to the lack of shale jewellery found in the surrounding Dorset area, archaeologists theorised that Green Island was a centre of production that exported its goods to continental Europe. This theory lends further evidence to Green Island having once been an important port.
