= Gigger's Island =

Island in Poole Harbour, England

Coordinates: 50°41′27″N 2°04′21″W

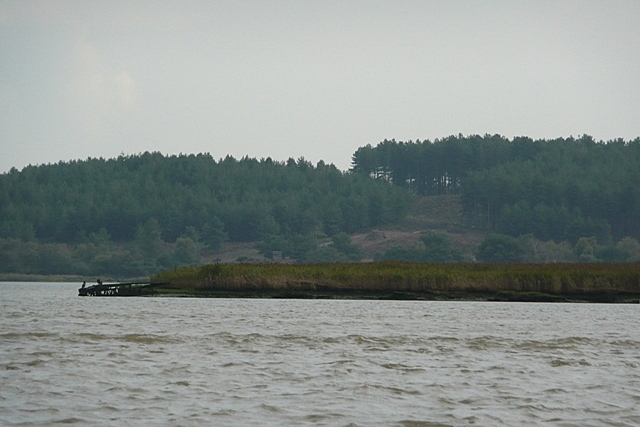
Gigger's Island in Poole Harbour.

Gigger's Island is an island in Poole Harbour in the English county of Dorset. The island is situated near to the Frome and Piddle rivers, near to the opening of Poole Harbour. The entrance to the harbour is lit to the north of Gigger's Island. Historically, the island was part of the boundary of the parish of Arne, and in 2006, the island was purchased by the Dorset Wildfowlers Association. Landing on the island is only permitted below the high water mark, and at nighttime the island is sometimes home to 20,000 gulls.

The island is sometimes referred to as Horse Island locally. This is because, historically, it was used to quarantine horses that arrived in Poole Harbour from abroad.
