= River Sherford =

River in Dorset, England

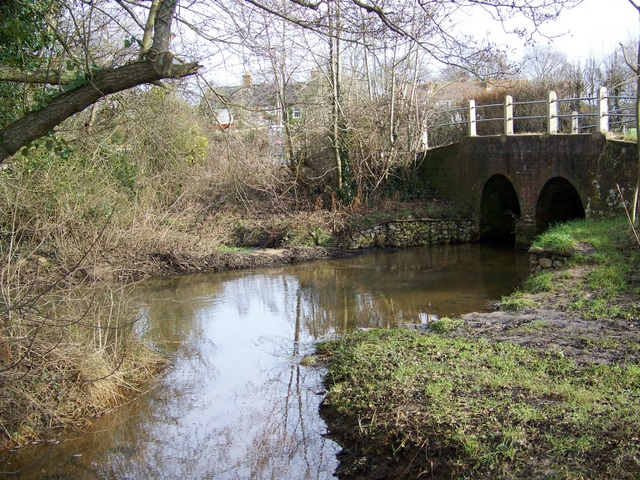
- Organford Bridge on the Sherford

Physical characteristics
- Source
  - location: Whitefield near Bere Regis
- Mouth
  - location: Lytchett Bay, Poole Harbour
  - coordinates: 50°43′34″N 2°03′00″W
- Length: 12.317 km (7.653 mi)
- Basin size: 45.348 km^{2} (17.509 sq mi)

The River Sherford, also frequently called the Sherford River, is one of the four main rivers flowing into Poole Harbour in the county of Dorset, England. It is about 12 kilometres long and drains over the tertiary beds near the harbour.

== Course ==
It rises at a spring in the hamlet of Whitefield, west of Lytchett Matravers, flows southwards into Morden Park lake and then eastwards, passing under the A351 before discharging into Lytchett Bay as the Rock Lea River on the northern side of Poole Harbour.

== Water quality ==
The Sherford's water body status in 2013 was graded "poor" by the Environment Agency.
