= Green Island (Dorset) =

Island in Poole Harbour in England

Coordinates: 50.67893°N 1.990799°W

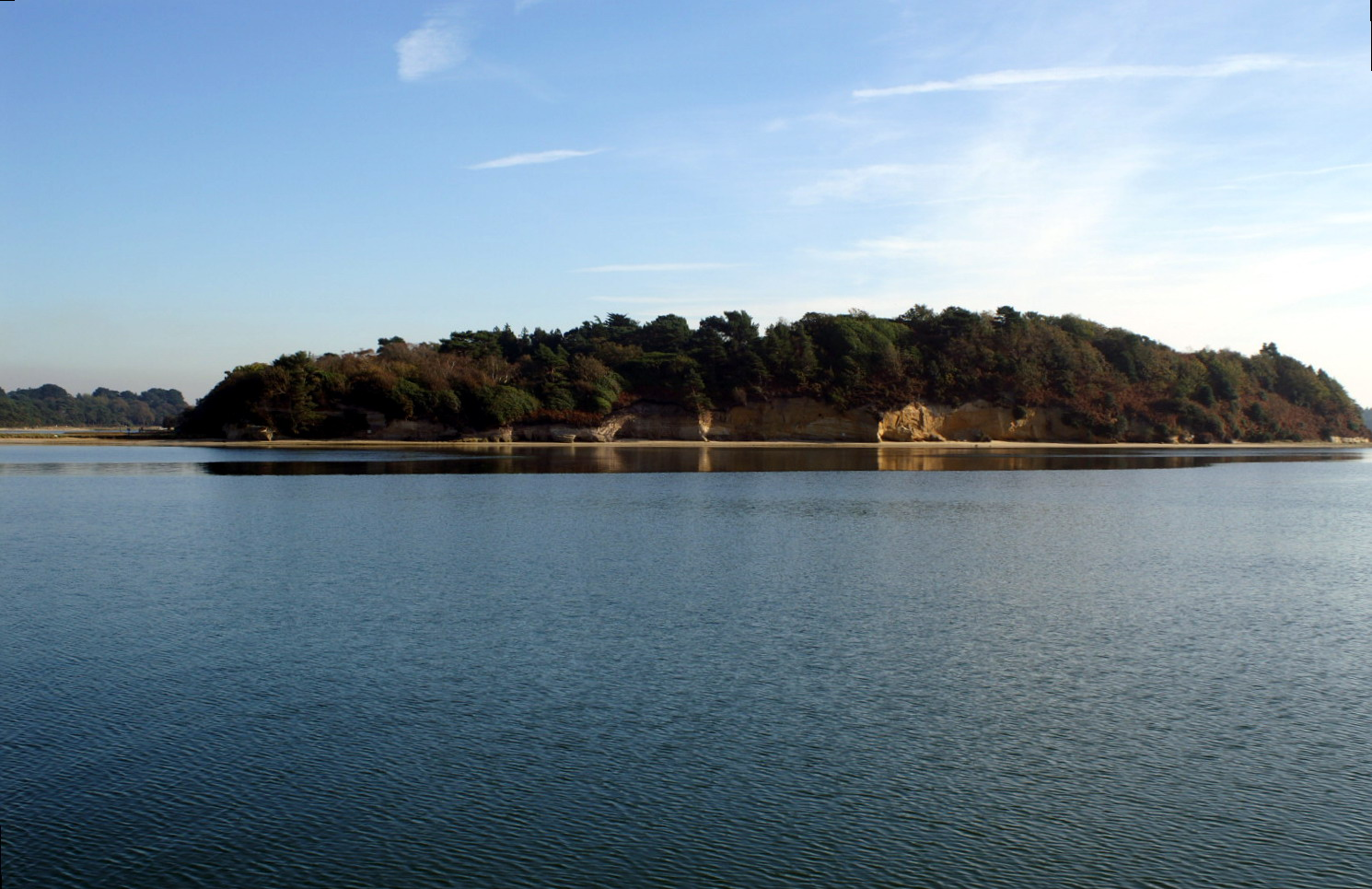
- Green Island from the South Deep channel to the south west

- Location within Dorset
- OS grid reference: SZ006866
- Civil parish: Corfe Castle
- Unitary authority: Dorset
- Ceremonial county: Dorset
- Region: South West
- Country: England
- Sovereign state: United Kingdom
- Police: Dorset
- Fire: Dorset and Wiltshire
- Ambulance: South Western
- UK Parliament: South Dorset

Green Island is an island in Poole Harbour in the English county of Dorset. It lies in the central south part of the harbour, south of Brownsea Island and Furzey Island. The island is a Site of Special Scientific Interest (SSSI) and Special Protection Area (SPA), and is within the Dorset National Landscape.

== Geography ==
The island covers approximately 45 acres (18 ha) at low tide while the central raised part of the island is approximately 19 acres (7.7 ha). The island is covered in extensive woodland in the centre, made up of Scots pine with several small zones of heathland. The island also has a large salt marsh and several small glades, as well as a beach area. Most of the island is made of sandstone. It has two buildings: a two-bedroom summer house and a single-story cabin known as the Greensleaves. The island has a helicopter landing pad and a private wooden jetty. The island, along with Brownsea Island and Furzey Island, is one of the few known places in England where red squirrels are still found.

Green Island lies within the civil parish of Corfe Castle.

== History and ownership ==
The island is currently privately owned by Edward Iliffe, a multi-millionaire from Berkshire. The island was owned from 1987 by the Davies family until 2005. In 2005 the island was put up for sale at an asking price of £2.5 million. In previous years, the island was used by the Green Island Holiday Trust which ran a limited number of holidays for disabled and disadvantaged people on the island. It was also used for corporate events, weddings and functions. The Green Island Holiday Trust now conducts its activities at Holton Lee (near Upton).

The island was featured on television in the archaeology programme Time Team. In 2003 Time Team visited the island and conducted works to examine the island's rich history. The dig uncovered a furnace as well as pottery fragments. Evidence suggests that at one point Green Island was twice its size and a major place of trading in southern England. This episode was first broadcast on 8 February 2004. The island is part of a current project run by Bournemouth University to discover the history of Poole Harbour, in conjunction with Poole Maritime Trust. Between 1968 and 1988 the potter Guy Sydenham lived at the island.

On the morning of 20 April 2012, a fire destroyed a 3-storey wooden building that was still under construction. Fire crews were summoned at 07:20 BST, and around 40 firefighters extinguished the blaze.
