= Poole Harbour =

Natural harbour in England

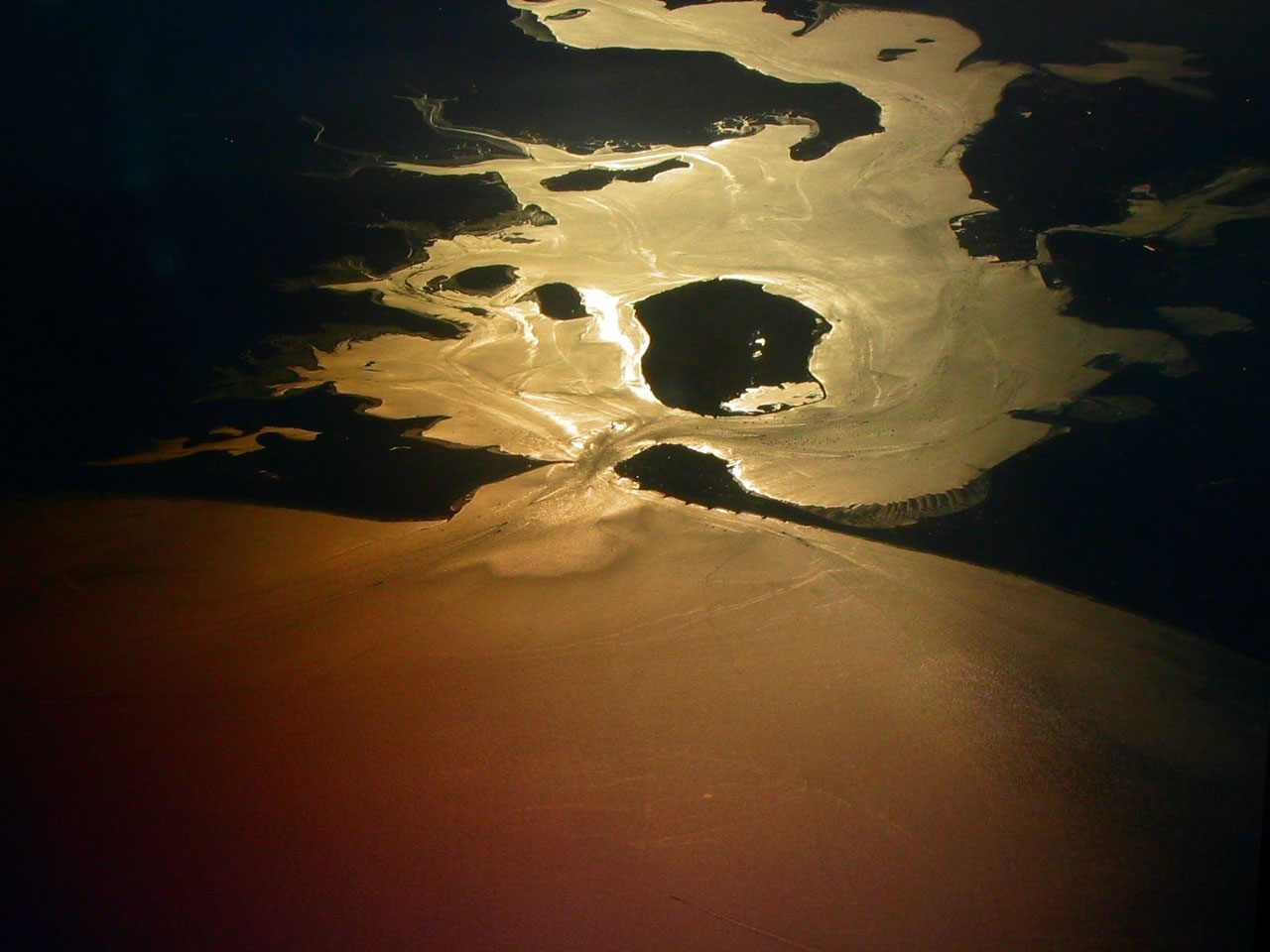
- Aerial view of the harbour entrance, looking west-north-west. The large island just inside the entrance is Brownsea Island; to its left are Furzey Island and then Green Island.

- Location in Dorset
- Location: Dorset, England
- Coordinates: 50°41′45″N 1°59′19″W
- Surface elevation: 0 metres (0 ft)

Ramsar Wetland
- Official name: Poole Harbour
- Designated: 22 July 1999
- Reference no.: 1005

Poole Harbour is a large natural harbour in Dorset, southern England, with the town of Poole on its shores. The harbour is a drowned valley (ria) formed at the end of the last ice age and is the estuary of several rivers, the largest being the Frome. The harbour has a long history of human settlement stretching to pre-Roman times. The harbour is extremely shallow (average depth 48 cm [19 in]), with one main dredged channel through the harbour, from the mouth to Holes Bay.

Poole Harbour has an area of approximately 36 km^{2} (14 sq mi). It is one of several which lay claim to the title of "second largest natural harbour in the world" (after Port Jackson, Sydney).

== History ==
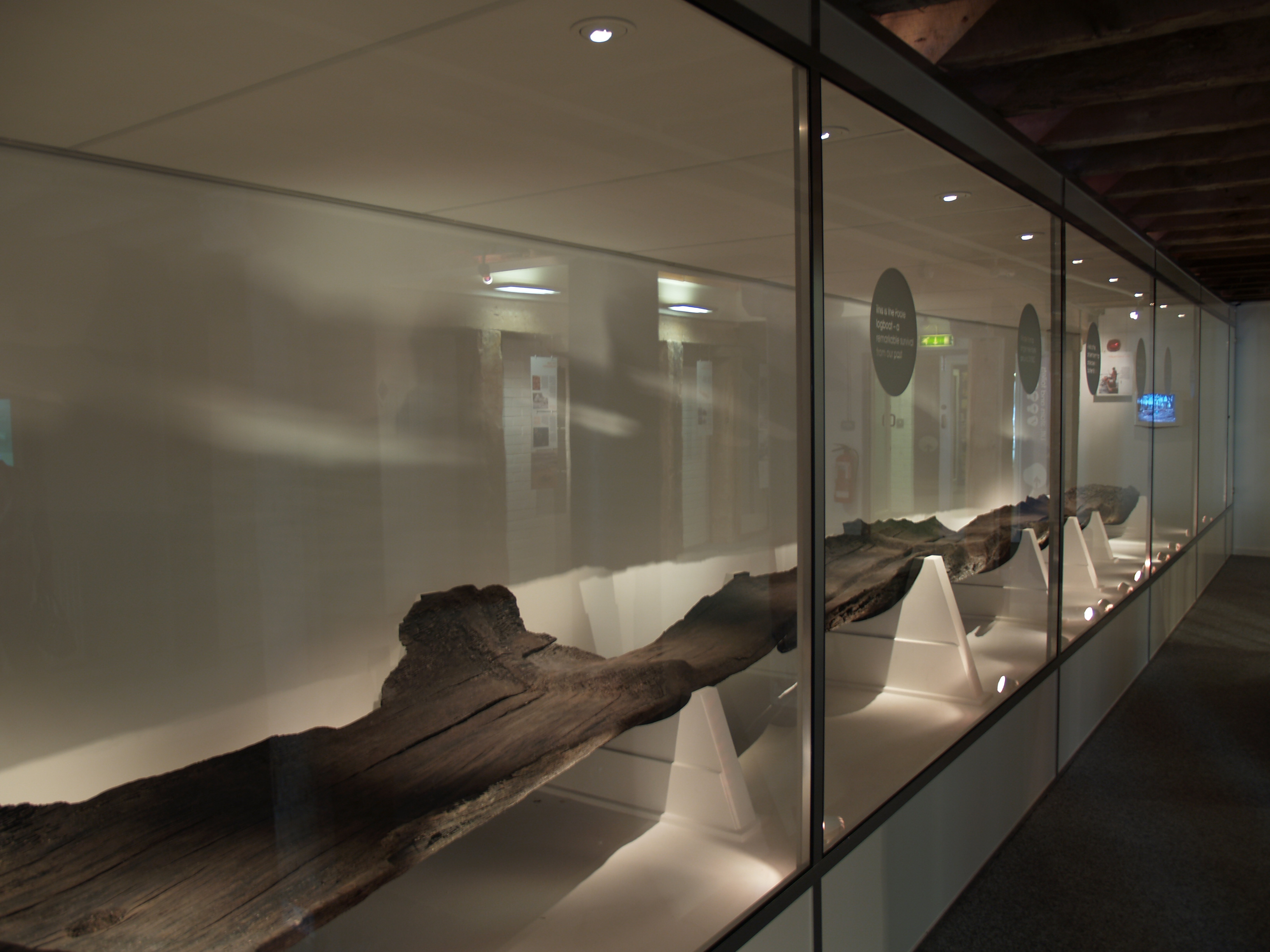
The Poole Logboat was excavated from Poole Harbour and is over 2,000 years old. It is on display in Poole Museum.

In 1964 during harbour dredging, the waterlogged remains of a 2,000-year-old Iron Age logboat were found off Brownsea Island. Dated at about 295 BC, the 10 metres (33 ft) Poole Logboat is one of the largest vessels of its type from British waters. Its low freeboard would have limited its use to within Poole Harbour.

Poole was used by the Romans as an invasion port for the conquest of southern England, who established the settlement at Hamworthy, now the western half of Poole. A Roman Road ran north from Hamworthy through a fort at Lake Farm, Ashington, to Badbury Rings, a Roman transport hub. At the time of the Norman Conquest, Poole was a small fishing village.

The port grew, and in 1433 Poole was made Dorset's Port of the Staple for the export of wool. Medieval Poole had trading links from the Baltics to Italy. In the 17th century, the town began trading with North America, in particular Newfoundland, and the town became very wealthy. In the 18th century, Poole was the principal British port trading with North America. At the start of the 19th century, 90% of Poole's population's employment was directly dependent on the harbour, but this dropped to 20% during the century as the railways reached the town, and deep-hulled boats moved up the coast to Southampton, which had a deeper harbour and is closer to London. With regular dredging of a channel through the harbour, it has regained some importance.

During WW2, Poole Harbour hosted seaplane bases.

Dorset Yacht Co Ltd v Home Office was decided in 1970.

The longest ship to enter the harbour is DFDS/LD Lines 186.5 metre Norman Voyager on 15 October 2013, with the second longest being the 167-metre Armorique of Brittany Ferries, which arrived in the port for the first time on 2 February 2010. The previous holder of that title was the 151-metre Bretagne, which arrived in the port for the first time on 27 February 2007.

On 26 March 2023, an oil spill occurred in the harbour, originating from the oil field at Wytch Farm, run by Perenco. The Poole Harbour Commissioners reported that around 200 barrels of "reservoir fluid" had leaked into Poole Harbour from one of the oil field's pipelines. The Environment Agency described it as a "major incident".

== Geography and islands ==
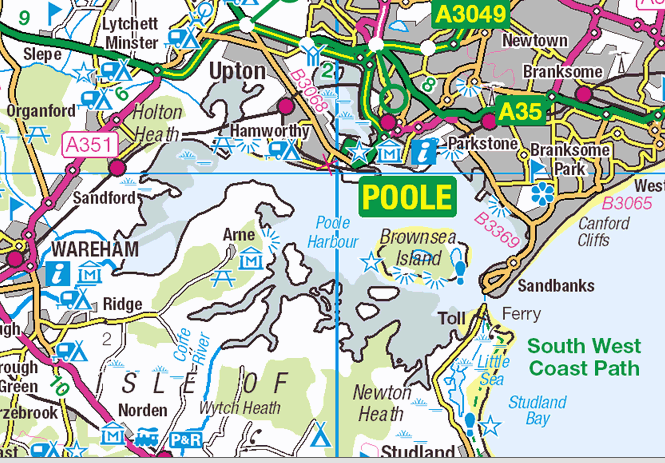
Map of Poole Harbour

The entrance to Poole Harbour is from the east, via Poole Bay and the English Channel. Entering the harbour, heading west, on either side are the shores of Studland beach (south west) and Sandbanks (in particular, the Haven Hotel and the peninsula, north east). Directly ahead are several islands, the largest of which is Brownsea Island.

Four rivers drain into Poole harbour, the largest being the River Frome, which flows from the west through Dorchester and Wareham. The others are the River Piddle, the Corfe River and the Sherford River.

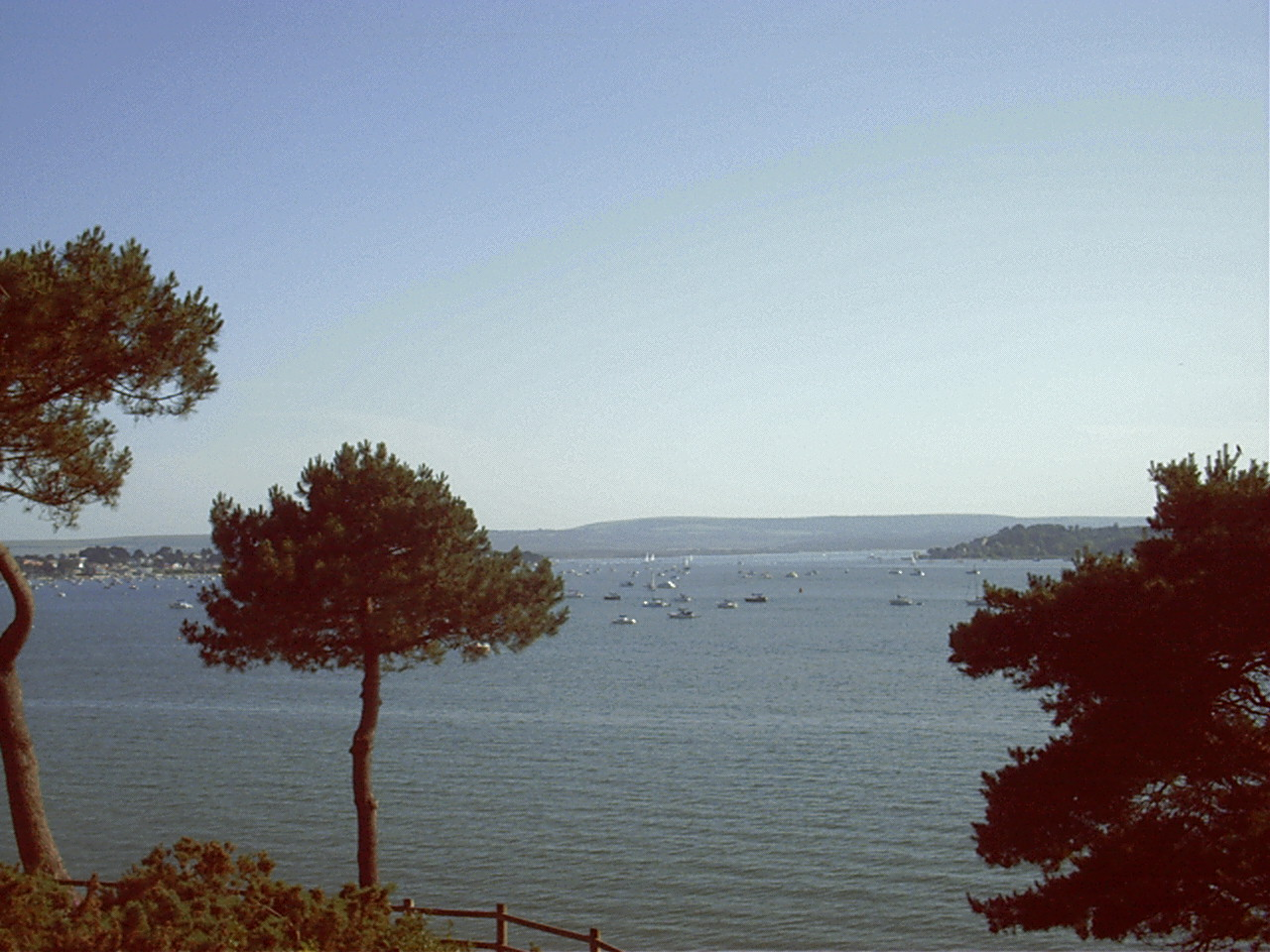
View across the harbour looking west from Lilliput, Poole

Following the harbour anti-clockwise, heading north-east passes the built up residential settlements of Poole including Lilliput and Parkstone (east). About 4 miles (6.4 km) north-west of the entrance of the harbour is the entrance to Poole Quay and the Holes Bay (see below). Directly west of the main part of Poole is Hamworthy. Continuing anti-clockwise, heading west around the harbour are the settlements of Upton and Wareham, as well as the outlet of the River Piddle. This area of water within the harbour is known as Wareham Channel and includes other places such as Rockley Sands.

Continuing anti-clockwise, now heading south are the majority of the islands within the harbour as well as several small channels and inlets. To the west is Arne Bay and the Wych channel. The majority of land in this area is heathland, and there are few settlements, as opposed to the eastern part of the harbour. Directly south is Long Island, Round Island and Ower Bay. Green Island, Furzey Island and Brownsea Island (in that order) are to the east, with Newton Bay and Brands Bay (this area has several oil wells) to the south. This area of water is known as the South Deep. Continuing anti-clockwise comes back to the entrance to the harbour and to Poole Bay, with Studland beach immediately south-east.

Lytchett Bay lies to the north of the harbour and flows into it through a narrow channel near the edge of the suburb of Hamworthy. This is fed by the Sherford River.

=== Holes Bay ===
Holes Bay is a tidal inland lake which lies to the north of Poole Harbour. It is a designated harbour quiet area. The entrance to the bay is a small inlet from the main harbour. Spanning the inlet are two bridges: Poole Bridge and the new Twin Sails Bridge; the latter officially opened in 2012 and cost around £37,000,000. Access to Holes Bay for vessels with an air draft greater than 2.1 metres (6.9 ft) is only possible when the bridges are lifted, which occurs several fixed times daily and sometimes on request. The new bridge is intended to help reduce traffic jams by ensuring at least one bridge is open to vehicular traffic at any one time.

The bay contains Pergins Island, and the South Western railway line runs west to east on a causeway across the bay. To the north of the bay is Upton Country Park.

Holes Bay is the location of the Royal National Lifeboat Institution (RNLI) training school, attached to their Poole headquarters. Uses of the bay include fishing, kayaking and small leisure craft. A large marina known as Cobbs Quay is on the west side of the bay. On its east side the bay runs parallel to the A350.

=== Parkstone Bay ===
Parkstone Bay is named after the suburb of Parkstone. Harbourside Park wraps around the bay.

=== Islands of Poole Harbour ===
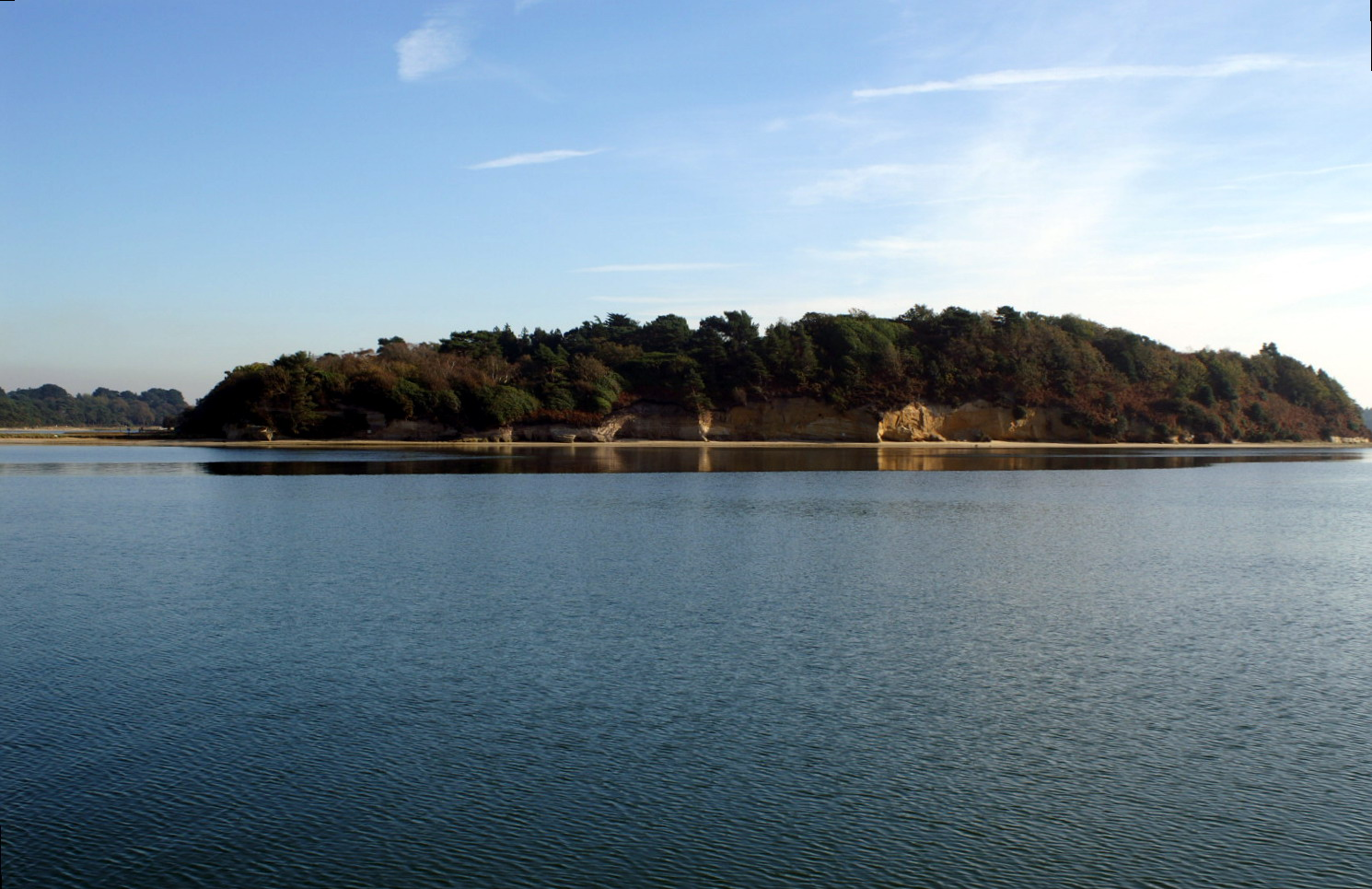
Green Island, one of the islands within Poole Harbour

Poole Harbour is the location of a number of islands, of various sizes. These islands include:

- Brownsea Island is near the sea entrance at Sandbanks.
- Furzey Island is south of Brownsea Island.
- Green Island is directly south of Furzey island.
- Long Island is near the Arne Peninsula.
- Round Island
- Gigger's Island is in the west of the harbour near the River Piddle outlet.
- Drove Island is in the south of the harbour in Brands Bay.
- Pergins Island is in the north of the harbour in Holes Bay.
- Stone Island lies between Brownsea and Studland. It is a ridge of gravel and sand, possibly the remains of an old recurved shingle spit, which is only visible between high tides, and as such is a danger to sailors. It is now gradually being submerged by rising sea-level.
- Otter Island is in the south west of Lytchett Bay.

== Geology ==
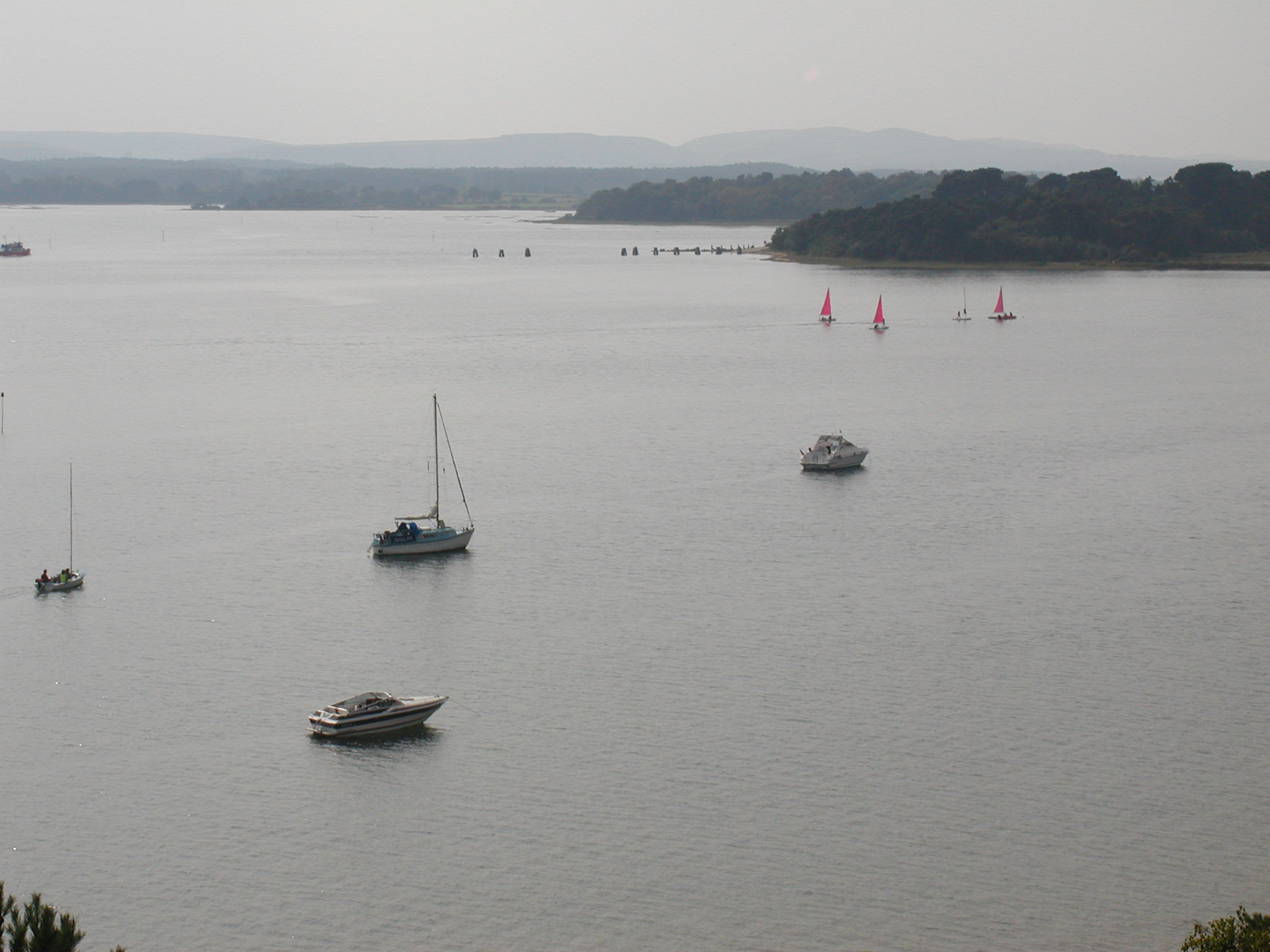
A quiet corner of the harbour, looking south from Brownsea Island

The harbour lies on a band of weak gravel and clay which is easily eroded by the rivers and sea. This band is bordered by two bands of chalk, the Purbeck Hills and Isle of Wight to the south, and the Dorset Downs and South Downs to the north. The clay extends west up the Frome valley to Dorchester, and would originally have extended east beyond Portsmouth in Hampshire. Before the last ice age the River Frome continued to flow east through what is now the Solent, joining the Stour, Beaulieu, Test, Itchen and Hamble, before flowing into the English Channel to the east of the present day Isle of Wight. A relatively resistant chalk ridge ran continuously from the Purbeck Hills to the Isle of Wight, which the rivers could not break through.

When the glaciers of the north of the island of Great Britain melted, the south of England sank slightly, flooding the Solent valley and Southampton Water to form their characteristic rias (flooded estuaries). About 7,000 years ago, increased erosion from the sea and the increased flow caused by the change in climate broke through the chalk hills, cutting the Isle of Wight off from the Isle of Purbeck and flooding what is now the Solent and Christchurch Bay, leaving Poole Harbour as the estuary of the Frome.

== Marine activity ==
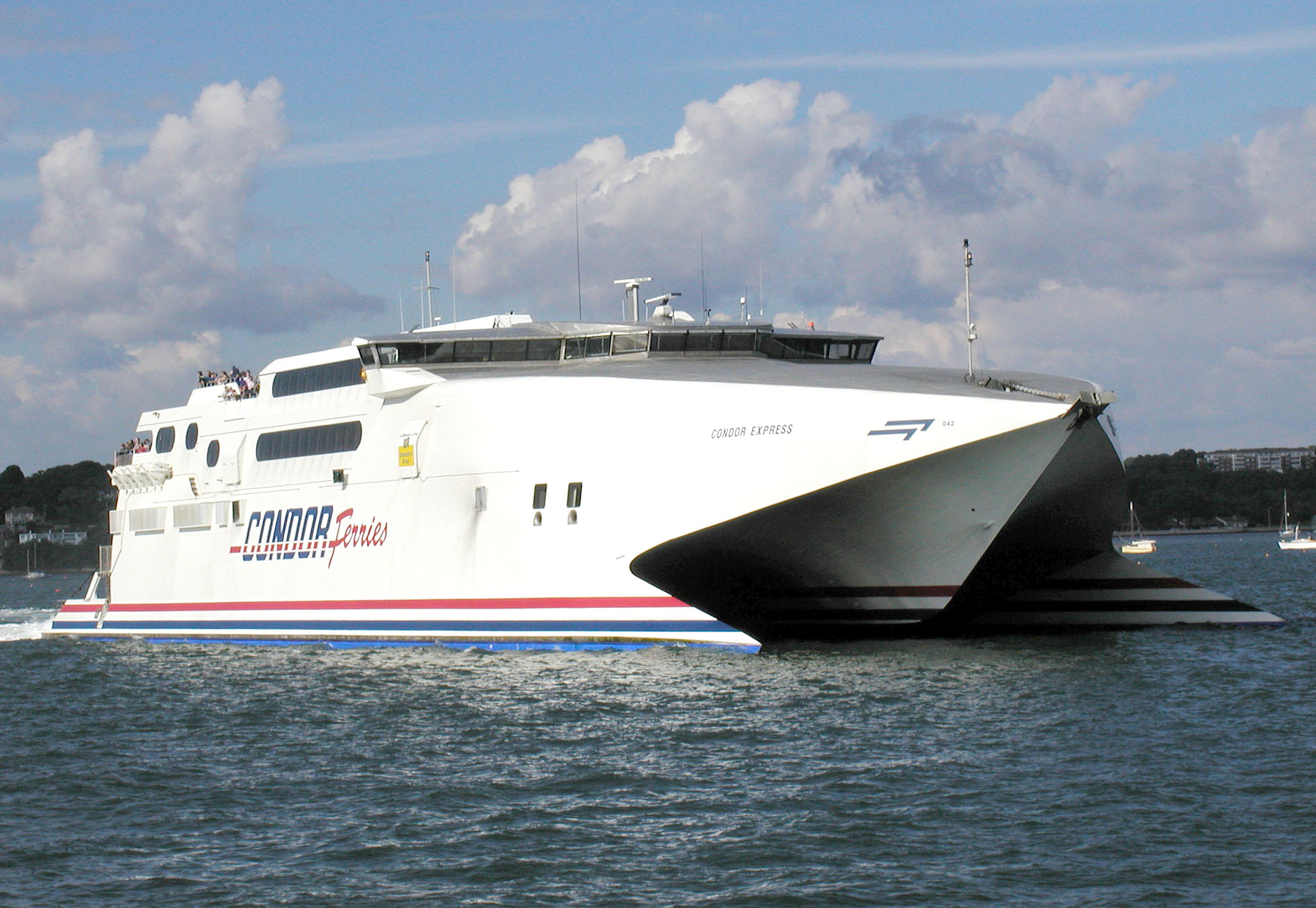
Condor Ferries car ferry passes through the harbour

Once a major port, freight transport has declined, but the port is still served by regular cross-Channel passenger ferries, with Brittany Ferries offering a passenger and freight service to Cherbourg. Condor Ferries operate to the Channel Islands and St Malo.

Coastal trading vessels are also frequent visitors, unloading various cargos on the quaysides at Hamworthy, and fleet of fishing vessels operates from the south end of Poole Quay. There is considerable leisure usage of the harbour, by a combination of yachts and other private craft, cruise boats that ply the harbour, and ferries that provide a passenger link to Brownsea Island. The harbour is managed by the Poole Harbour Commissioners (PHC), who represent all aspects of commercial and leisure activity in the harbour. Their duties include maintaining the shipping channels for the ferries and cargo vessels, enforcing harbour speed limits, improving port facilities and assisting with nature conservation.

In November 2005 the main shipping channels into the harbour and the Port of Poole were dredged to accommodate modern ferries at all states of the tide. The project was carried out by Van Oord, and on completion the depth had been increased from 6 to 7.5 metres (20 to 25 ft). Approximately 1.8 million cubic metres of sand and silt were dredged from the approach channels to the harbour and port, and 1.1 million m^{3} was made available to the local beaches of Poole, Bournemouth and Purbeck for beach replenishment.

Poole Harbour Commissioners define the main shipping channels, in which leisure craft should take care, as :

- The Swash Channel from the Bar Buoy to the Chain Ferry
- The Haven Channel from the Chain Ferry to 16 buoy
- The Middle Ship Channel, from 16 buoy to Stakes
- The turning basin, off the Ferry Port
- The Little Channel from Stakes to Poole Bridge.

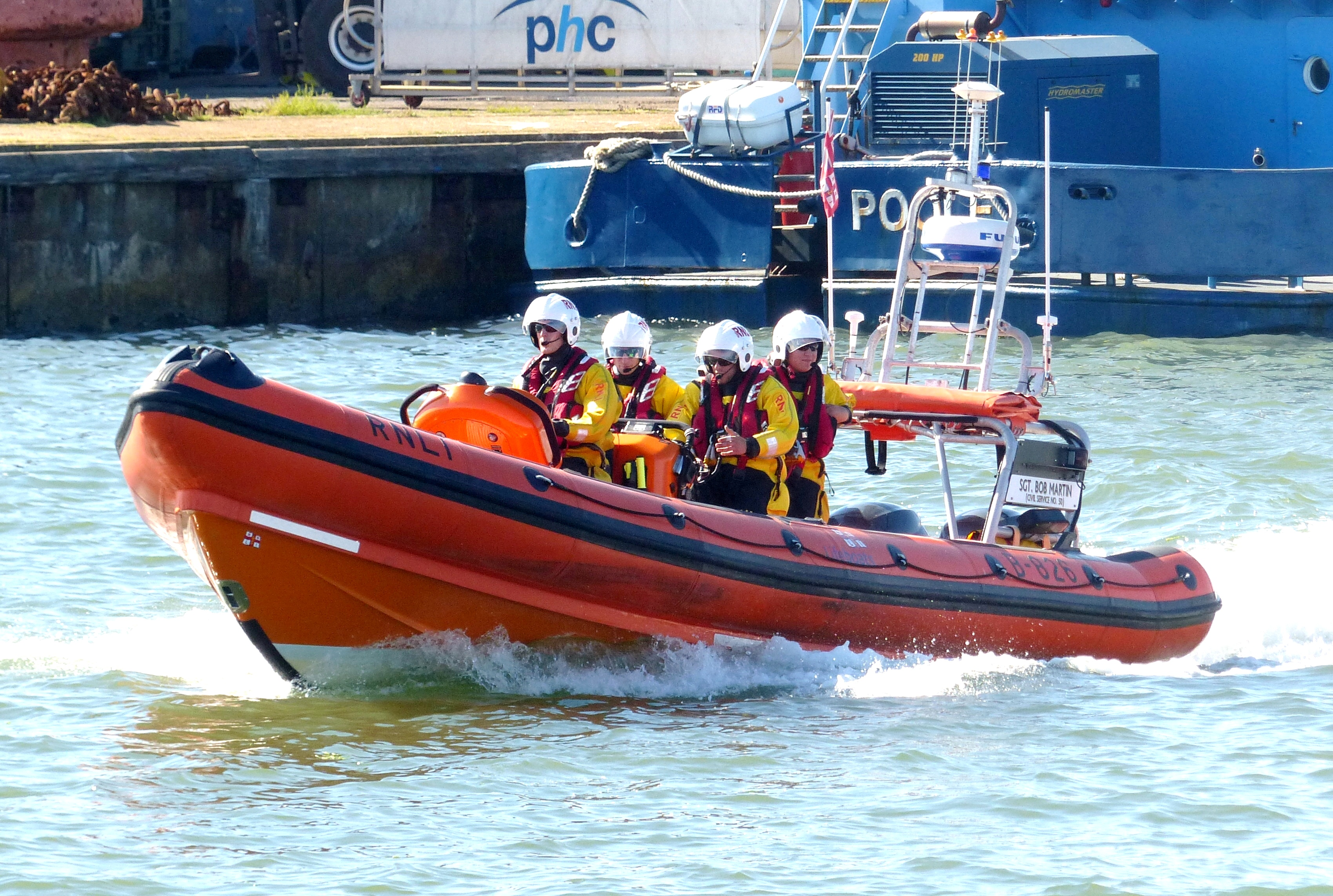
B class Atlantic 85 lifeboat of the RNLI, stationed in Poole Harbour

=== Marinas ===
As well as the commercial activity discussed above, Poole is a major centre for sailing and motor boating.

- Poole Quay Boat Haven is the most central marina, situated immediately east of the Town Quay on the main road through the town centre.
- Town Quay itself still accommodates larger visiting boats.
- Port of Poole marina is a little south-west of there, close to the ferry terminal, and for resident and visitors.
- Parkstone Bay Marina is located in Parkstone Bay to the east
- Cobbs Quay Marina is in Upton Bay to the north-west, accessed only when the town Bridge (A350) is opened.
- Salterns Marina is by Lilliput and houses the former Poole Harbour Yacht Club

There is an enormous number of moorings in the harbour, and many places to anchor.

=== Yacht Clubs ===
- Parkstone Yacht Club
- Poole Yacht Club
- Royal Motor Yacht Club
- East Dorset Sailing Club
- Lilliput Sailing Club
- North Haven Yacht Club
- Redclyffe Yacht Club
- Sandbanks Yacht Company

== Ecology and nature conservation ==
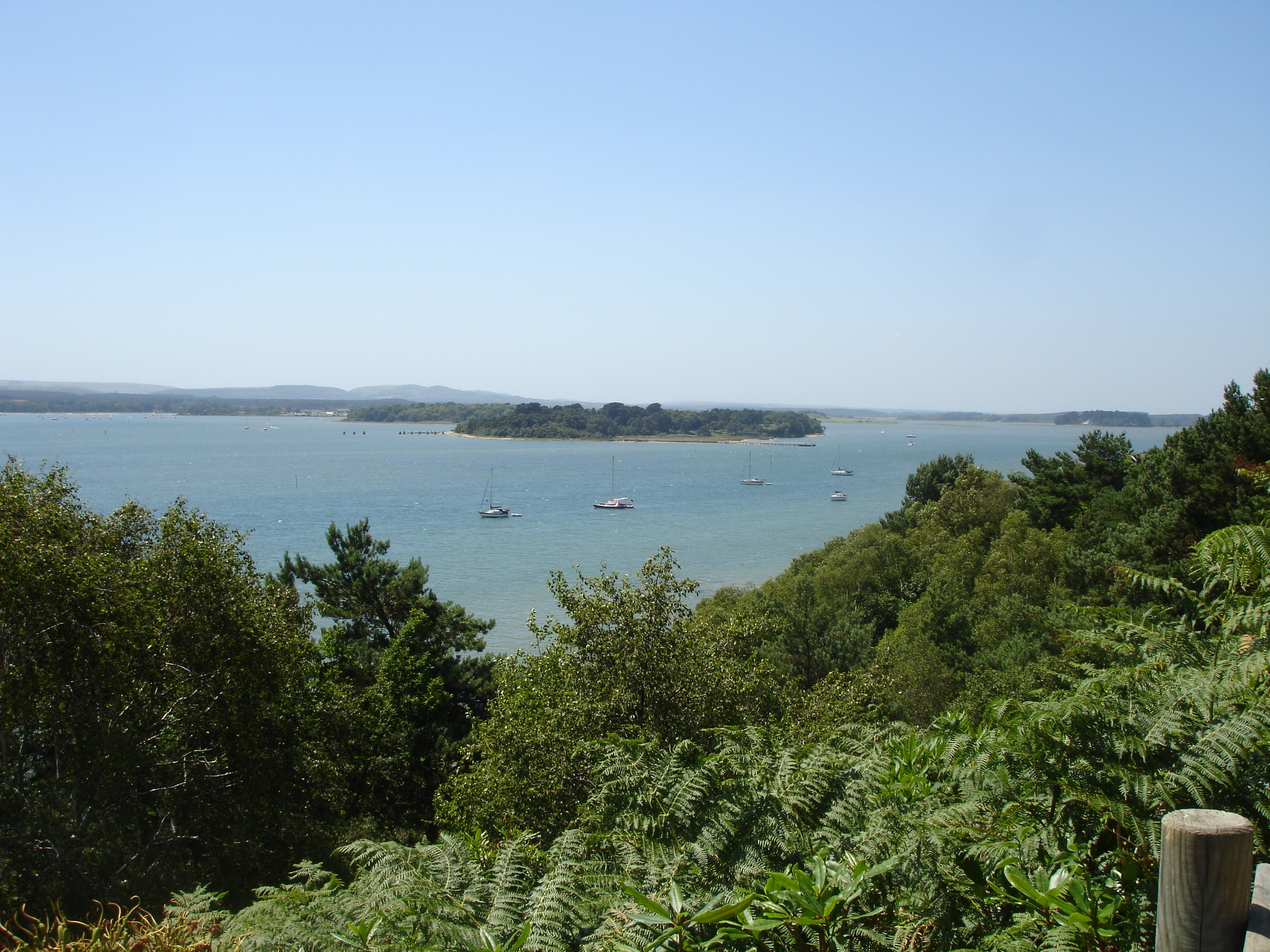
Looking south-west from Brownsea Island – Furzey Island is centre, with Green Island directly behind, to the left. Round Island can also be seen to the right of the picture with the Arne Peninsula behind it.

Much of the north side of the harbour is a built-up area, including the town of Poole, and the conurbation which continues 10 miles (16 km) eastwards along the coast. The west and south sides of the harbour and part of the Purbeck Heritage Coast are important wildlife havens, as are the five large islands in the harbour, which are home to the endangered red squirrel. The harbour is an area of international importance for wildlife conservation and is on the Ramsar list. It borders three national nature reserves, including the internationally important Studland and Godlingston Heath NNR, and a number of local and non-statutory nature reserves run by organisations such as the National Trust and RSPB, notably Arne. The mouth of the harbour is partially blocked by Sandbanks, a spit on the north, which is built up and part of Poole, and by Studland to the south, which is another important wildlife area.

The harbour is very shallow in places and has extensive mud flat and salt marsh habitats, as well as muddy and sandy shores and seagrass meadows. Due to the high levels of recreation and tourism in the area, careful management by local authorities and organisations is required to prevent habitat damage.

The south shore of the harbour, including Wytch Heath and Godlingston Heath, is open heathland of little agricultural use. During the 20th century there was some afforestation with conifer plantations. Around Wareham Forest in the west this has been for commercial forestry, but on the southern shore the plantations conceal the Wytch Farm oil wells.

Three bird species occur in internationally important numbers: common shelduck, pied avocet and black-tailed godwit. Other notable visitors include spoonbill, Sandwich tern and Eurasian whimbrel. Once rare, little egrets are now seen regularly and in increasing numbers.

On 23 April 2022, ospreys nesting in Poole Harbour produced an egg, the first in southern England in modern times. The successful hatching is the first in 200 years. In August 2022, it was reported that one of the two chicks had been killed in a hawk attack. In May 2023, the only breeding pair of ospreys have hatched their first two chicks of the year.

== Urbanisation and development ==
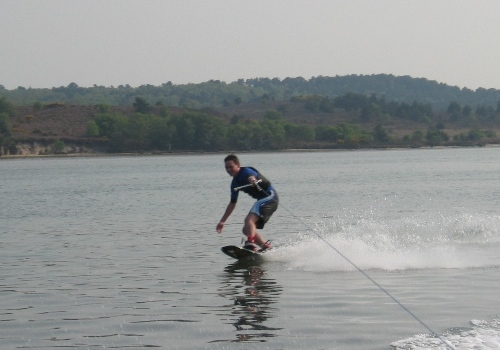
A wakeboarder riding down the Wareham channel

Due to the ever-increasing popularity of pleasure boating in the United Kingdom, the harbour has seen a rapid increase in the private ownership of pleasure vessels over the past decade, most of which are housed in private marinas around the harbour. Due to this increase, Poole has seen a rise in the number of maritime-oriented businesses.

With the popularity of watersports such as water skiing, wakeboarding, windsurfing and kitesurfing, Poole Harbour Commissioners have designated areas within the harbour almost exclusively for sport participation – virtually unrestricted from most regular harbour rules. Poole is also fortunate in that wind conditions are variable; wind conditions can be calm for sports such as wakeboarding, and a short while later strong for sports such as windsurfing. Most of these sports benefit from the harbour's generally flat water conditions. As a result, local watersport businesses operate around the harbour.

Poole Tourism has developed and signed a number of trails and circular walks, collectively called the Poole Harbour Trails, as well as the Poole Heritage Cycle Route for cyclists.

A freight-only branch runs from Hamworthy railway station to Poole Docks. However, the line is fenced off at the Poole Docks level crossing with a run-round loop provided at Hamworthy Park. In 2017, it was served by a weekly stone train. As of 2024, this has stopped and the line abandoned.

== See also ==
- List of Dorset beaches
- Sandbanks Ferry
