= Lytchett Bay =

Coordinates: 50.7270°N 2.0393°W

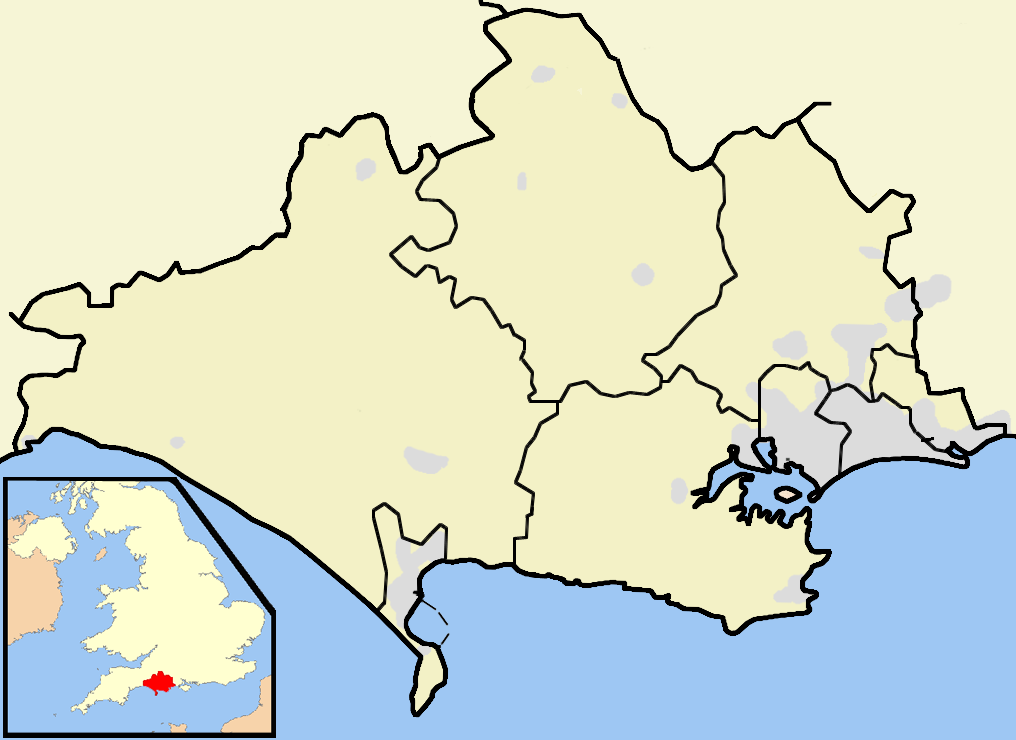
Map of Dorset with Lytchett Bay southeast of the centre.

Lytchett Bay is located close to the town of Upton, Dorset, United Kingdom.

It is possible to walk from Lytchett Bay to Rockley Park via the shoreline path that borders the Turlin Moor estate. The most interesting part of Lychett Bay can however, only be accessed via the Turlin Moor estate and consists of areas of saltmarsh and tiny beaches. Walking from the beach where boats are moored it takes nearly 40 minutes to walk the shoreline to the far side which has a population of adders. The walk goes through a small wooded area where deer can sometimes be seen and a meadow that is managed with a short spell along a very quiet road. The water can be reached at two separate spots on the far side of Lychett Bay and gives a much better view of the swans and other birds that frequent the bay at different times of the year.

Lytchett Bay was a popular children's haunt during the 1980s and 1990s. It was common for boats to wash up on the shore of Lytchett Bay during spells of bad weather. The boats would be hidden away in the reeds, then brought out during the summer months.

== See also ==
- Lytchett Minster
