= Coat of arms of Poole =

Coat of Arms of Poole
- Armiger: Poole (1563-1974), Poole Borough Council (1974-2019), Charter Trustees for Poole (2020-).
- Adopted: Recorded 1563, crest granted 1948, supporters granted 1976
- Crest: On a Wreath of the Colours a Mermaid proper supporting with her dexter hand an Anchor cabled without a beam proper and in her sinister hand a Pellet
- Shield: Barry wavy of eight Sable and Or a Dolphin naiant embowed Argent langued Gules on a Chief wavy of the third three Escallops of the first
- Supporters: On the dexter a Lion holding a Sword erect proper and on the sinister a Dragon supporting an Oar Argent
- Compartment: A Compartment per pale a grassy Mound proper and Water barry wavy Azure and Argent
- Motto: "Ad Morem Villae de Poole" (Latin) "According to the custom of the town of Poole"
- Earlier version
- Use: The coat of arms of Poole appears on street signs in the former Poole Borough Council area. A variant of the arms is used by Poole Grammar School.

The emblazonment of the coat of arms of Poole used by the Borough Council from 1976

The coat of arms of Poole was first recorded by Clarenceux King of Arms during the heraldic visitation of Dorset in 1563. The arms were recorded again at the visitation of 1623, but neither visitation noted the colours of the arms. The design originated in a seal of the late 14th century and therefore predated the setting up of the College of Heralds in 1484 and also the order of King Henry V in 1417, which disallowed the bearing of arms without authority from the Crown.

The arms were confirmed by the College of Arms on 19 June 1948, with the colours officially recorded for the first time. At the same time the crest was granted, a mermaid supporting an anchor and holding a cannonball, although it had been in use since the 18th century. Following local government reorganisation in 1974, the 1948 arms were transferred to the present Poole Borough Council. In 1976 the borough council received the grant of supporters, the figures on either side of the shield, a gift from Oscar Murton, the then Deputy Speaker of the House of Commons to commemorate his period of service as a Councillor and MP for Poole.

On 1 May 2019 the Borough of Poole was abolished and merged into the new Bournemouth, Christchurch and Poole unitary authority. The councillors representing the area of the former borough form charter trustees for the town, and on 14 August 2020 the arms were transferred to the trustees by royal licence.

== Symbolism ==
The wavy bars of black and gold represent the sea and the dolphin "the king of the sea", just as the lion represents "the king of beasts". The dolphin was a sign of Poole's maritime interests. The three scallop shells are the symbol of St James, apostle of Jesus Christ, and are associated with the shrine of Santiago de Compostela, St James's reputed burial place. Santiago de Compostela was a popular destination for Christian pilgrims departing from Poole Harbour in the Middle Ages. St James is also the patron saint of the parish church of Poole.

The supporters refer to Poole's main charters. To the left is a gold lion holding a long sword. This represents William Longespee, who as Lord of the manor in 1248 granted the town's first charter. The other supporter to the right is a dragon which is derived from the Royal Arms of Elizabeth I, who granted Poole county corporate status in a charter (the Great Charter) of 1568. The royal dragon is coloured red, but that granted to Poole was altered to gold for heraldic difference. The dragon holds a silver oar. This is part of the civic regalia of the Mayor of Poole, representing his additional title "Admiral of the Port of Poole". Since 1976 the dolphin has been depicted naturalistically rather than heraldically.

The Latin motto, Ad Morem Villae De Poole, is taken from the town's Great Charter of 1568 and means According to the Custom of the Town of Poole.
