= Poole Park Railway =

Coordinates: 50°43′13.1″N 1°57′52.9″W

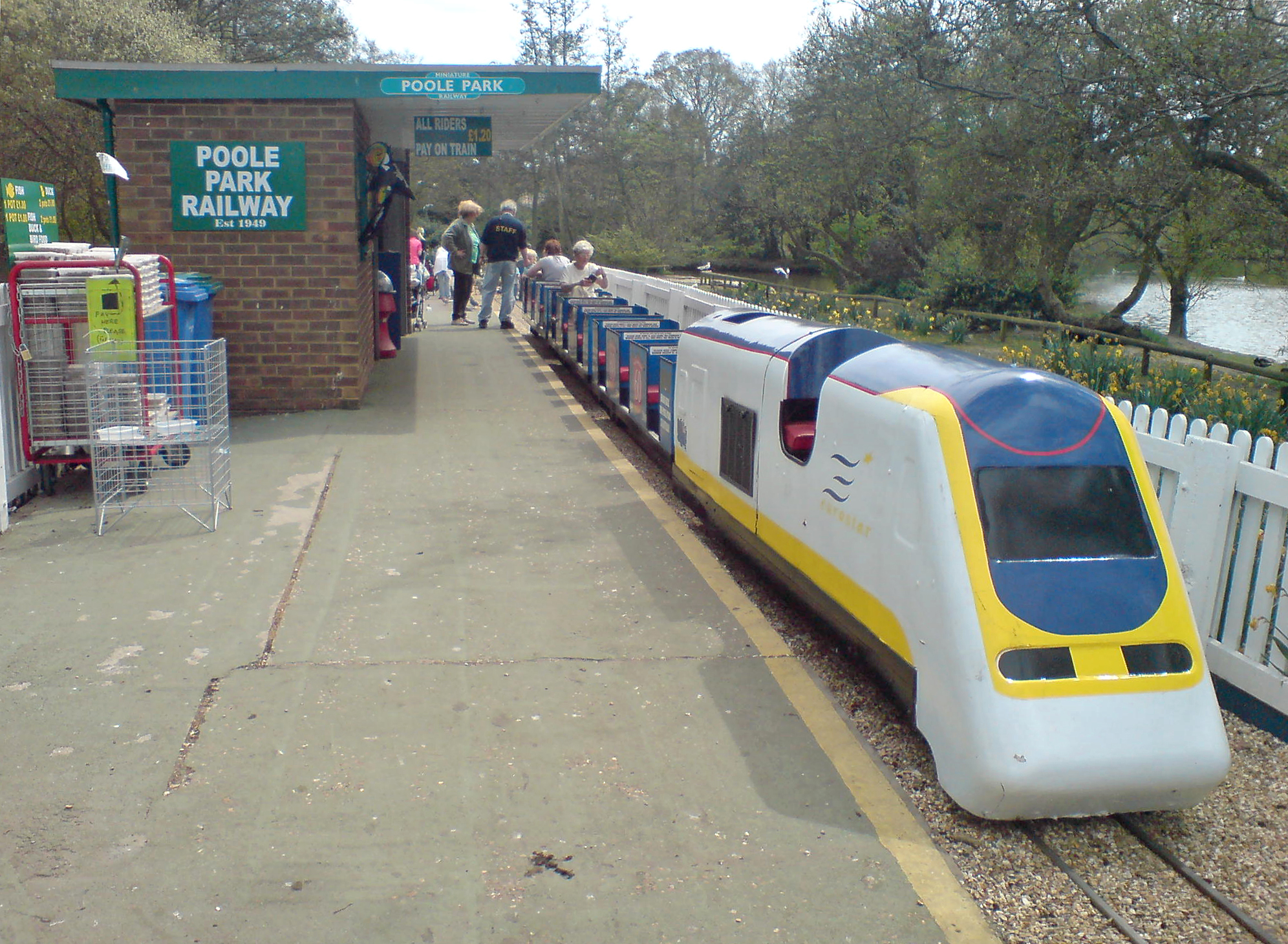

Overview
- Locale: Poole Park, Dorset, England
- Dates of operation: 1949–

Technical
- Track gauge: 10 1/4 in (260 mm)
- Length: 640 metres (700 yd)

Other
- Website: https://poolepark.uk/poole-park-railway/

The Poole Park Railway is a miniature railway that runs through Poole Park in Poole, Dorset, England. The line runs throughout the year, weather permitting.

The 32-person capacity railway carriages are wheelchair accessible. They are liveried in green which alongside the yellow branding of the railway pay homage to Southern Railway that operated in the area from 1923 to 1947.

The carriages are pulled along a 10 1/4 inch gauge track by a diesel engine currently on loan to the railway courtesy of the Newlyn Downs Branch line at Lappa Valley, a miniature railway in Cornwall.

== History ==
In 1949 Southern Miniature Railways Ltd started this 10 1/4 in (260 mm) gauge railway. They also operated miniature railways in Stokes Bay, Bognor Regis and Southsea. The only one to survive to present times is Poole Park.

A freelance 4-4-2 tender loco “Vanguard” was used every day until 1965 and occasionally until 1970. After 1970 two diesel outline locos were used first powered by Ford Sidevalve engines then diesel.

Steam did briefly return in the 1990s with an engine called Arthur used mainly on Saturdays, which was sold in 1997.

The line was taken over by Chris Bullen on 2 June 2005, becoming the third operator since 1949.

Poole Borough Council ended their tenancy agreement with Chris Bullen in 2017, ordering that the historic track be removed before tenders for a new operator would begin on 1 March 2017. The council, after backlash from the public and the media, then said that the track may remain in place until after the tendering process.

A petition was started to save the historic track from destruction on 38 Degrees website.

The Railway was awarded to the Friends of Poole Park (a charity) in July 2017, with a concession to operate the Railway for 30 years. On 25 April 2018 two of the three railway CIC directors resigned as a result of an unworkable business relationship with the third director. The forty or more volunteers who had operated the railway and maintained the track all 'walked' out in sympathy. Subsequently, the Borough of Poole were unconvinced that the railway CIC could operate the railway safely, following a derailment in May 2018 and the walk out of Friends of Poole Park, the concession was withdrawn and the CIC issued with a 'Notice to Quit' in July 2018.

BCP Council received a grant from the Parks Foundation and added additional funds of its own; in 2021 a new engine shed was installed and new track was laid by Track Systems of Shropshire. The Railway re-opened September 2022 and is run by BCP Council supervisory staff alongside a team of volunteers.

== See also ==
- Purbeck miniature railway
