= Poole =

Coastal town in Dorset, England

- Town
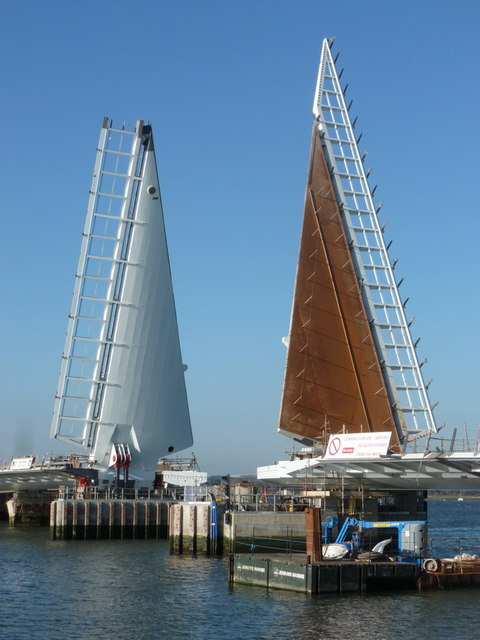
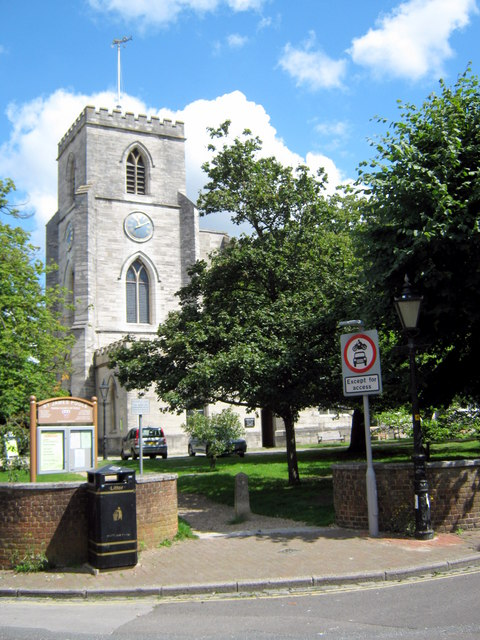
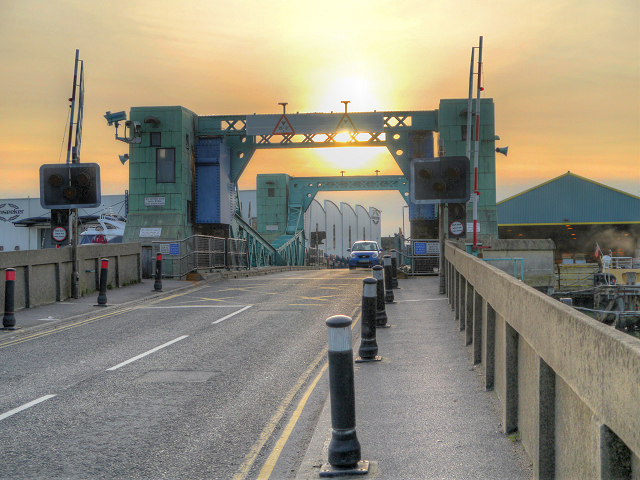
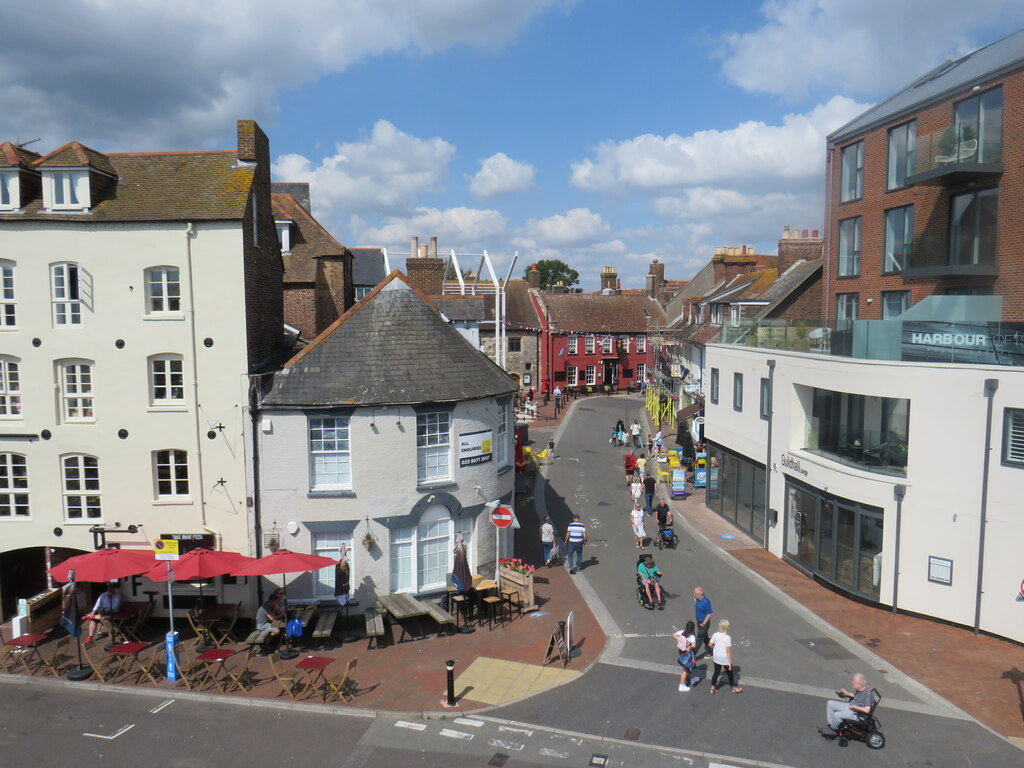
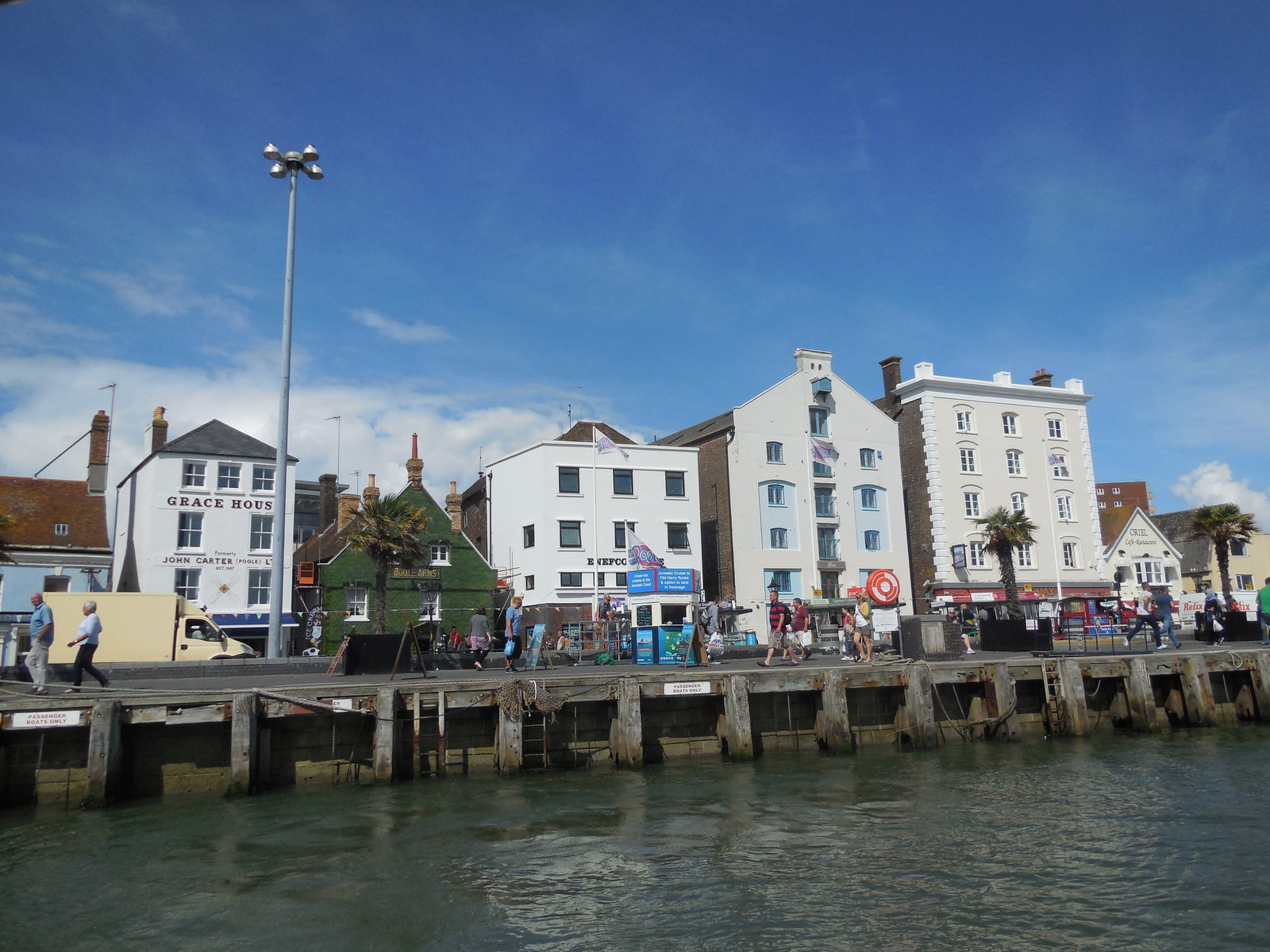
- Twin Sails Bridge Parish church Hamworthy Bridge the Old Town the Quayside

- Flag Coat of arms of the charter trustees
- Motto: "Ad Morem Villae De Poole" "According to the custom of the Town of Poole"
- Former Poole unitary authority (dark red) within Bournemouth, Christchurch and Poole (red)
- Coordinates: 50°43′N 1°59′W
- Sovereign state: United Kingdom
- Constituent country: England
- Region: South West England
- Ceremonial county: Dorset
- Historic county: Dorset
- Unitary authority: Bournemouth, Christchurch and Poole

Government
  - Type: Civil parish
  - Body: Poole Town Council
  - MPs: Jessica Toale (L); Neil Duncan-Jordan (L); Vikki Slade (LD)

Area
  - Total: 25.05 sq mi (64.88 km^{2})

Population (2025)
  - Total: 143,418
  - Density: 5,520/sq mi (2,133/km^{2})
- Time zone: UTC0 (Greenwich Mean Time)
  - Summer (DST): UTC+1 (British Summer Time)
- Postcodes: BH12–17
- Area code: 01202
- ISO 3166-2: GB-POL
- ONS code: 00HP (ONS); E06000029 (GSS)
- OS grid reference: SZ009906
- Ethnicity 2011 Census: 91.9% White British; 3.3% Other White; 1.0% South Asian; 0.3% Black; 3.5% Other
- Website: poole.gov.uk

Poole (/puːl/) is a coastal seaport town, on the south coast of England and civil parish in the Bournemouth, Christchurch and Poole unitary authority area in Dorset, England. The town is 21 miles (34 km) east of Dorchester and adjoins Bournemouth to the east. The town had an estimated population of 143,418 in 2024, making it the second-largest town in the ceremonial county of Dorset. Together with Bournemouth and Christchurch, the conurbation has a total population of 400,196 as of the 2021 census.

The settlement dates back to before the Iron Age. The earliest recorded use of the town's name was in the 12th century when the town began to emerge as an important port, prospering with the introduction of the wool trade. Later, the town had important trade links with North America and, at its peak during the 18th century, it was one of the busiest ports in Britain. In the Second World War, Poole was one of the main departing points for the Normandy landings.

Poole is a tourist resort, attracting visitors with its large natural harbour, history, the Lighthouse arts centre and Blue Flag beaches. The town has a commercial port with cross-Channel freight and passenger ferry services, which connect with the Channel Islands of Jersey and Guernsey, as well as the French port town of Saint-Malo, Brittany.

The headquarters of the Royal National Lifeboat Institution (RNLI) is in Poole, and the Royal Marines have a base in the town's harbour. Despite their names, Poole is the home of Arts University Bournemouth, the Bournemouth Symphony Orchestra and a significant part of Bournemouth University.

== History ==
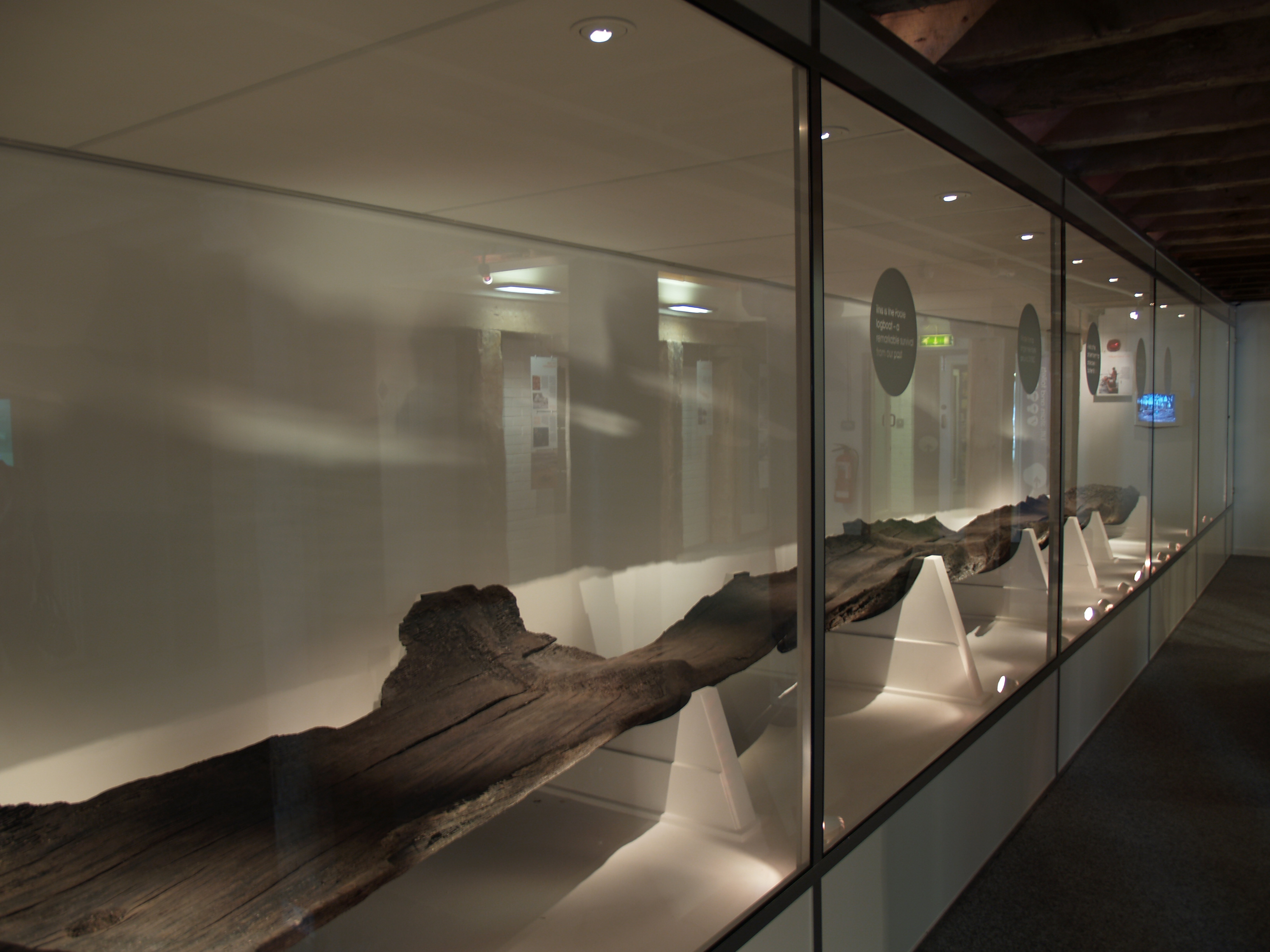
The Poole Logboat, a 2,000-year-old dugout canoe discovered during dredging works in Poole Harbour and now in the Poole Museum

The area around modern Poole has been inhabited for at least the past 2,500 years, with nearby Christchurch Harbour evidencing human activity dating back to the Neolithic period at Hengistbury Head. During the 3rd century BC, Celtic-speaking people known as the Durotriges moved from hilltop settlements at Maiden Castle and Badbury Rings to heathland around the River Frome and Poole Harbour. The Romans landed at Poole during their conquest of Britain in the 1st century and took over an Iron Age settlement at Hamworthy, an area just west of the modern town centre. This was used as a supply base for the fortress at Lake Farm, Ashington and a settlement at Vindocladia (Bradbury Rings).

The town's name may have originated around the post-Roman or Anglo-Saxon periods, and seems to have originally applied to the harbour. It is derived from the late Brittonic or early Old English words pol meaning a pool or creek.

By the middle to late Anglo-Saxon period, Poole was included in the Kingdom of Wessex. The settlement was used as a base for fishing and the harbour a place for ships to anchor on their way to the River Frome and the important Anglo-Saxon town of Wareham. Poole experienced two large-scale Viking invasions during this era: in 876, Guthrum sailed his fleet through the harbour to attack Wareham, and in 1015, Canute began his conquest of England in Poole Harbour, using it as a base to raid and pillage Wessex.

Following the Norman conquest of England, Poole rapidly grew into a busy port as the importance of Wareham declined. The town was part of the manor of Canford but does not exist as an identifiable entry in the Domesday Book. The earliest written mention of Poole occurred on a document from 1196 describing the newly built St James's Chapel in "La Pole". The Lord of the manor, Sir William Longspée, sold a charter of liberties to the burgesses of Poole in 1248 to raise funds for his participation in the Seventh Crusade. Consequently, Poole gained a small measure of freedom from feudal rule and acquired the right to appoint a mayor and hold a court within the town. Poole's growing importance was recognised in 1433 when it was awarded staple port status by King Henry VI, enabling the port to begin exporting wool and in turn granting a licence for the construction of a town wall. In 1568, Poole gained further autonomy when it was granted legal independence from Dorset and made a county corporate by the Great Charter of Elizabeth I. During the English Civil War, Poole's puritan stance and its merchants' opposition to the ship money tax introduced by King Charles I led to the town declaring for Parliament. Poole escaped any large-scale attack and with the Royalists on the brink of defeat in 1646, the Parliamentary garrison from Poole laid siege to and captured the nearby Royalist stronghold at Corfe Castle.

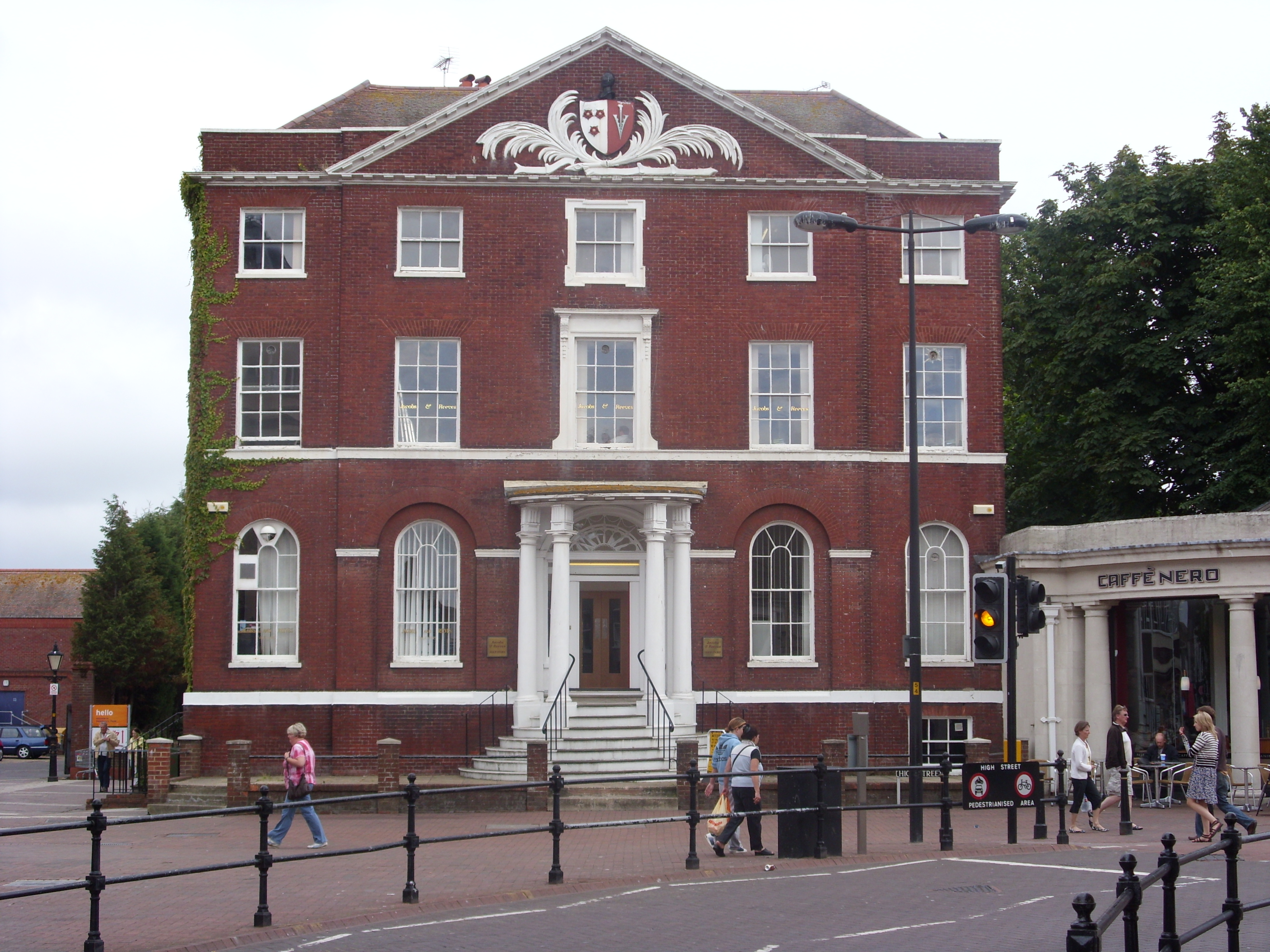
Beech Hurst in the town centre, a Georgian mansion built in 1798 for a wealthy Newfoundland merchant

Poole established successful commerce with the North American colonies in the 16th century, including the important fisheries of Newfoundland. Trade with Newfoundland grew steadily to meet the demand for fish from the Catholic countries of Europe. Poole's share of this trade varied but the most prosperous period started in the early 18th century and lasted until the early 19th century. The trade followed a three-cornered route; ships sailed to Newfoundland with salt and provisions, then carried dried and salted fish to Europe before returning to Poole with wine, olive oil, and salt. By the early 18th century, Poole had more ships trading with North America than any other English port and vast wealth was brought to Poole's merchants. This prosperity supported much of the development which now characterises the Old Town where many of the medieval buildings were replaced with Georgian mansions and terraced housing. The end of the Napoleonic Wars and the conclusion of the War of 1812 ended Britain's monopoly over the Newfoundland fisheries and other nations took over services provided by Poole's merchants at a lower cost. Poole's Newfoundland trade rapidly declined and within a decade most merchants had ceased trading.

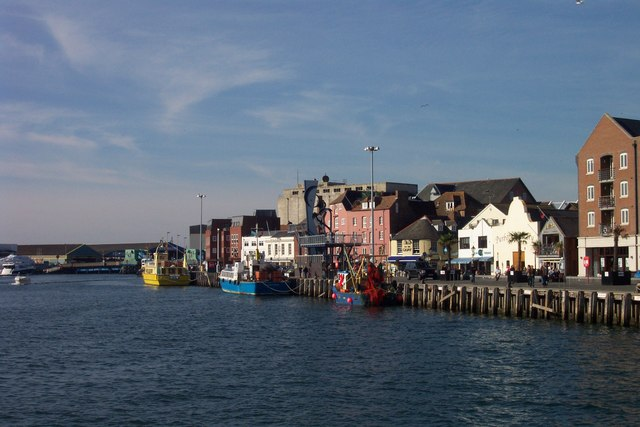
Poole Quay was the busy centre of the town's maritime trade.

The town grew rapidly during the Industrial Revolution as urbanisation took place and the town became an area of mercantile prosperity and overcrowded poverty. At the turn of the 19th century, nine out of ten workers were engaged in harbour activities. On 1 January 1848 the port had 116 registered vessels (13,641 tons) of its own but as the century progressed, ships became too large for the shallow harbour and the port lost business to the deepwater ports at Liverpool, Southampton and Plymouth. Poole's first railway station opened in Hamworthy in 1847 and later extended to the centre of Poole in 1872, effectively ending the port's busy coastal shipping trade. The beaches and landscape of southern Dorset and south-west Hampshire began to attract tourists during the 19th century and the villages to the east of Poole began to grow and merge until the seaside resort of Bournemouth emerged. Although Poole did not become a resort, like many of its neighbours, it continued to prosper as the rapid expansion of Bournemouth created a large demand for goods manufactured in Poole.

During World War II, Poole was the third-largest embarkation point for D-Day landings of Operation Overlord and afterwards served as a base for supplies to the allied forces in Europe. Eighty-one landing craft containing American troops from the 29th Infantry Division and the US Army Rangers departed Poole Harbour for Omaha Beach. Poole was also an important centre for the development of Combined Operations and the base for a US Coast Guard rescue flotilla of 60 cutters. Much of the town suffered from German bombing during the war - in which the Municipal Borough lost 75 civilian lives - and years of neglect in the post-war economic decline. Major redevelopment projects began in the 1950s and 1960s and large areas of slum properties were demolished and replaced with modern public housing and facilities. Many of Poole's historic buildings were demolished during this period, particularly in the Old Town area of Poole. Consequently, a 6-hectare (15-acre) Conservation Area was created in the town centre in 1975 to preserve Poole's most notable buildings. The Poole explosion of 1988 caused 3,500 people to be evacuated out of the town centre in the biggest peacetime evacuation the country had seen since the World War II.

== Governance ==
There are 2 tiers of local government covering Poole, parish (town) and at unitary authority level: Bournemouth, Christchurch and Poole Council, which is based at the Civic Centre in Bournemouth.

=== Administrative history ===
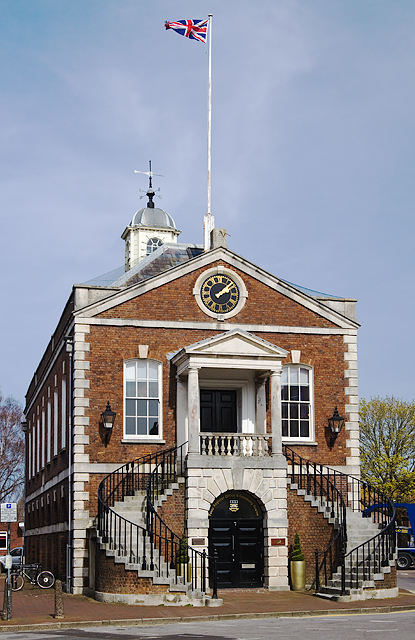
Poole Guildhall, Market Street: Built 1761 and served as courthouse and meeting place for the borough council until 1932

Poole was an ancient borough, which lay within the ancient parish of Canford Magna. The borough acquired its first charter in 1248 from William Longespée, who was lord of the manor. A chapel of ease dedicated to St James existed at Poole from at least 1142. In 1538, the borough was removed from the parish of Canford Magna to become its own parish, called Poole St James.

In 1568, Poole was given the right to appoint its own sheriff, making it a county corporate, independent from the jurisdiction of the Sheriff of Dorset.

In 1836, Poole was reformed to become a municipal borough. As part of that reform, the borough boundaries were enlarged to take in Hamworthy, Longfleet and Parkstone. (Note: The parish of Hamworthy, and tithings of Longfleet and Parkstone (both in the parish of Canford Magna) had been added to the Poole constituency in 1832; the Municipal Corporations Act 1835 directed that the reformed borough should be enlarged to match the constituency.)

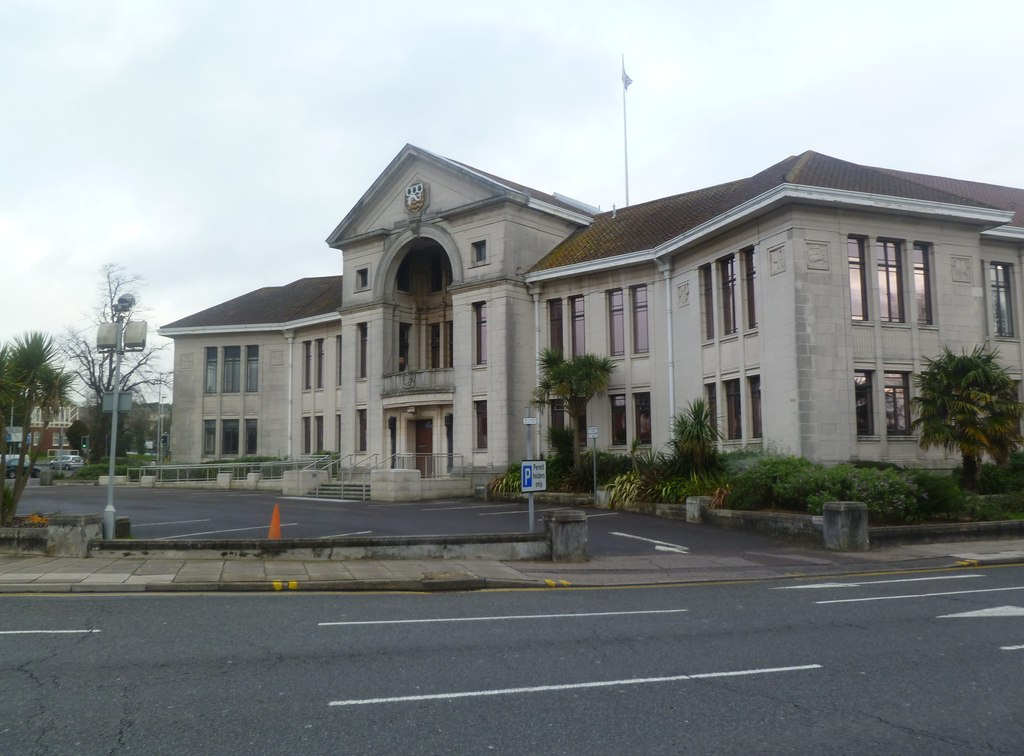
Civic Centre, Parkstone Road: Poole Borough Council's headquarters 1932–2019

When elected county councils were established in 1889, despite being a county corporate, Poole was not considered large enough for the borough council to take on county council functions. (Note: The usual threshold adopted for a borough to be made a county borough was a population of 50,000; at the preceding census of 1881, the borough of Poole's population was 12,310.) It was therefore included in the administrative county of Dorset under the new Dorset County Council. On 9 November 1095 the parishes of Branksome, Parkstone, Poole St James, Longfleet and Hamworthy were merged into a single parish called Poole concurrent with the borough. The borough boundaries were enlarged in 1905 to take in Branksome, and again in 1931 to absorb Canford Magna. In 1932 the borough council built itself Poole Civic Centre on Parkstone Road to serve as its headquarters.

The borough of Poole was reconstituted as a non-metropolitan district on 1 April 1974 under the Local Government Act 1972. The district kept the same boundaries and its borough status, but there were some changes to the council's responsibilities. No successor parish was formed so it became unparished.

In 1997, Poole Borough Council became a unitary authority, taking over the provision of county council functions from Dorset County Council.

The borough of Poole was abolished in 2019, merging with the boroughs of Bournemouth and Christchurch to become a new local government district called Bournemouth, Christchurch and Poole, the council of which is a unitary authority. The Bournemouth, Christchurch and Poole district remains part of the ceremonial county of Dorset for the purposes of lieutenancy.

When Poole Borough Council was abolished in 2019, Poole was given a charter trustees, being the Bournemouth, Christchurch and Poole councillors representing wards in the former borough of Poole. The trustees preserved the town's civic charters and traditions, including appointing one of their number each year to serve as mayor and another to serve as sheriff; these roles are now purely honorary with no practical functions. Poole is one of only fifteen towns and cities across England and Wales which appoint their own sheriff, with Poole's right to do so stemming from its former status as a county corporate.

On 1 April 2026, a civil parish was formed for Poole with its council named "Poole Town Council".

=== Parliamentary representation ===
Poole is represented by three parliamentary constituencies in the House of Commons; Poole, Mid Dorset and North Poole, and Bournemouth West. The borough constituency of Poole has existed since 1950. Previously the town had been a parliamentary borough, electing two members of parliament from 1455 until 1865 when representation was reduced to one member. In 1885 the constituency was abolished altogether and absorbed into the East Dorset constituency until its reintroduction in 1950. The seat was a Conservative stronghold for 74 years. Until the 2024 General Election in which Labour candidate Neil Duncan-Jordan won by 18 votes

=== Coat of arms ===
The coat of arms of the Borough of Poole

The design of the coat of arms originated in a seal from the late 14th century and were recorded by Clarenceux King of Arms during the heraldic visitation of Dorset in 1563. The wavy bars of black and gold represent the sea and the dolphin is a sign of Poole's maritime interests. The scallop shells are the emblem of Saint James and are associated with his shrine at Santiago de Compostela – a popular destination for Christian pilgrims departing from Poole Harbour in the Middle Ages.

The arms were confirmed by the College of Arms on 19 June 1948, and at the same time, the crest (a mermaid supporting an anchor and holding a cannonball) was granted. Following local government reorganisation in 1974, the 1948 arms were transferred to Poole Borough Council. In 1976, the council received the grant of supporters for the coat of arms. The supporters refer to important charters given to the town; to the left is a gold lion holding a long sword representing William Longespee who in 1248 granted the town's first charter; on the right is a dragon derived from the Royal Arms of Elizabeth I who granted Poole county corporate status in 1568. The Latin motto – Ad Morem Villae De Poole, means: According to the Custom of the Town of Poole, and derives from the Great Charter of 1568.

== Geography ==
Poole is a complex shore of the English Channel; it lies on the northern and eastern edges of Poole Harbour, 97 miles (156 km) west-southwest of London. The oldest part of the town (including the historic Old Town, Poole Quay and the Dolphin Shopping Centre) lies to the south-east of Holes Bay on a peninsula jutting into the harbour, although much of the land to the east of the peninsula has been reclaimed from the harbour since the mid-20th century. To the west is Upton and Corfe Mullen and across the northern border at the River Stour lies Wimborne Minster. At the eastern edge of Poole, the town abuts Bournemouth and the settlements of Kinson, Winton and Westbourne. To the south of Poole along the coast lies Poole Bay, which has 3 miles (4.8 km) of sandy beaches from Sandbanks in the west to Bournemouth in the east.

=== Urban areas and districts of the town ===
Poole is made up of numerous suburbs and neighbourhoods, many of which developed from villages or hamlets that were absorbed into Poole as the town grew.
Alderney – Bearwood – Branksome – Branksome Park – Broadstone – Canford Cliffs – Canford Heath – Creekmoor – Fleetsbridge – Hamworthy – Lilliput – Longfleet – Merley – Oakley – Newtown – Oakdale – Parkstone – Penn Hill – Sandbanks – Sterte – Talbot Village – Wallisdown – Waterloo – Whitecliff

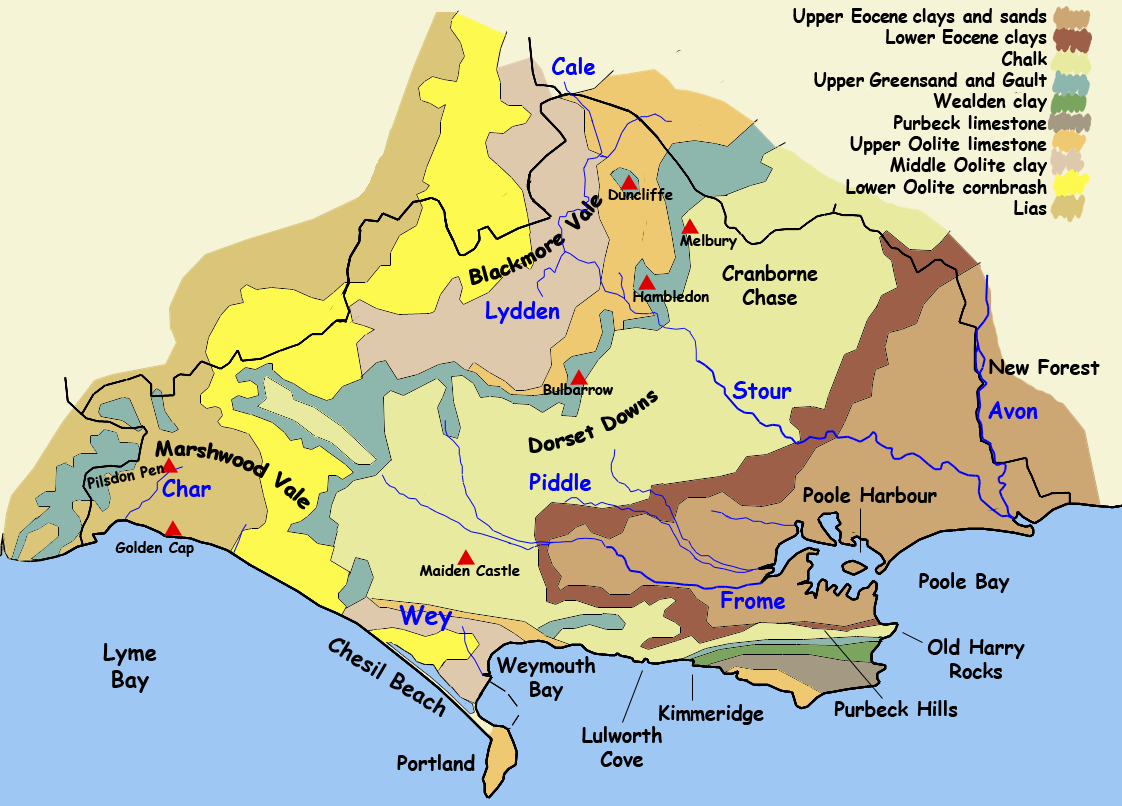
Poole lies on Eocene clays.

The natural environment of Poole is characterised by lowland heathland to the north and wooded chines and coastline to the south. The heathland habitat supports the six native British reptile species and provides a home for a range of dragonflies and rare birds. Development has destroyed much of the heath but scattered fragments remain to the north of Poole and have been designated Special Protection Areas. The town lies on unresistant beds of Eocene clays (mainly London Clay and Gault Clay), sands and gravels. The River Frome runs through this weak rock, and its many tributaries have carved out a wide estuary. At the mouth of the estuary sand spits have been deposited, enclosing the estuary to create Poole Harbour.

The harbour is the largest natural harbour in Europe and the second-largest natural harbour in the world after Sydney Harbour. It is an area of international importance for nature conservation and is noted for its ecology, supporting salt marshes, mudflats and an internationally important habitat for several species of migrating bird. It has been designated a Site of Special Scientific Interest (SSSI), a Special Protection Area and a Ramsar site as well as falling within the Dorset National Landscape area. The harbour covers an area of 15 square miles (11 sq nmi; 39 km^{2}) and is extremely shallow. The main shipping channels are 7.5 metres (25 ft) deep the average depth of the harbour is 48 centimetres (1 ft 7 in). It contains several small islands, the largest is Brownsea Island, a nature reserve owned by the National Trust and the birthplace of the Scouting movement and location of the first Scout Camp. Britain's largest onshore oil field operates from Wytch Farm on the south shore of the harbour. The oil reservoirs extend under the harbour and eastwards from Sandbanks and Studland for 6.2 miles (10 km) under the sea to the south of Bournemouth.

Situated directly to the east of the Jurassic Coast, Poole is a gateway town to the UNESCO World Heritage Site, which includes 95 miles (153 km) of the Dorset and east Devon coast important for its geology, landforms and rich fossil record. The South West Coast Path stretches for 630 miles (1,010 km) from Minehead in Somerset, along the coast of Devon and Cornwall and on to Poole. The path is England's longest national trail.

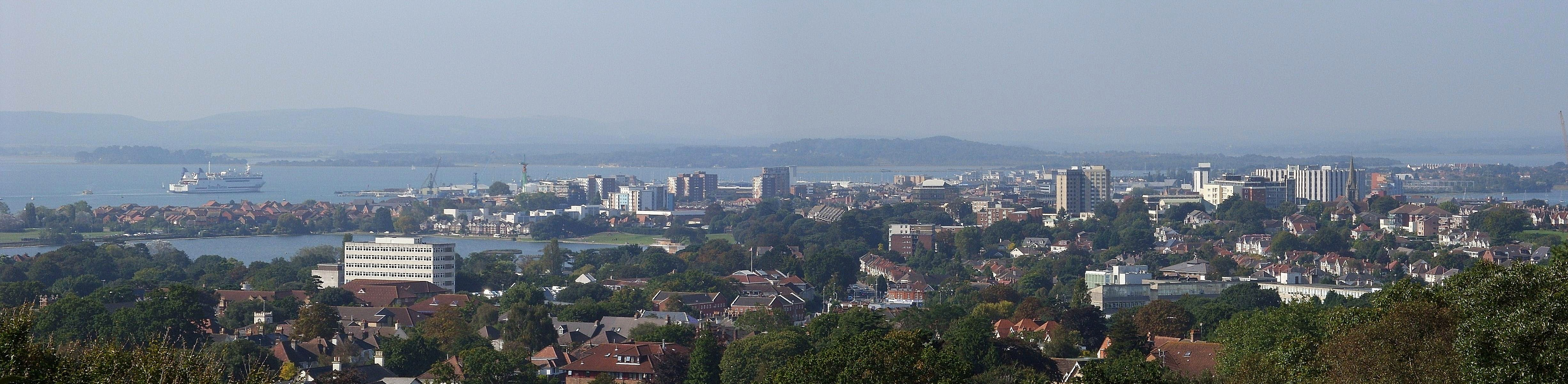
A panorama of Poole town centre viewed from Parkstone

=== Climate ===
Due to its location on the south coast of England, Poole has a temperate climate with a small variation in daily and annual temperatures. The average annual mean temperature from 1971 to 2000 was 10.2–12 °C (50.4–53.6 °F). The warmest months in Poole are July and August, which have an average temperature range of 12 to 22 °C (54 to 72 °F), and the coolest months are January and February, which have a range of 2 to 8.3 °C (35.6 to 46.9 °F). Mean sea surface temperatures range from 6.9 °C (44.4 °F) in February to 18.5 °C (65.3 °F) in August. The average annual rainfall of 592.6 millimetres (23.33 in) is well below the UK average of 1,126 millimetres (44.3 in).

Climate data for Poole, Dorset, England
Month	Jan	Feb	Mar	Apr	May	Jun	Jul	Aug	Sep	Oct	Nov	Dec	Year
Mean daily maximum °C (°F)	8 (46)	8 (46)	11 (52)	13 (55)	17 (63)	19 (66)	22 (72)	22 (72)	19 (66)	15 (59)	11 (52)	9 (48)	14.5 (58.1)
Mean daily minimum °C (°F)	2 (36)	2 (36)	3 (37)	4 (39)	7 (45)	10 (50)	12 (54)	12 (54)	10 (50)	7 (45)	4 (39)	3 (37)	6.3 (43.3)
Average precipitation mm (inches)	62.9 (2.48)	50.3 (1.98)	40.7 (1.60)	45.5 (1.79)	29.2 (1.15)	35.6 (1.40)	31.8 (1.25)	35.5 (1.40)	51.5 (2.03)	73.5 (2.89)	69.0 (2.72)	67.2 (2.65)	592.6 (23.33)
Source: MSN

=== Green belt ===
Poole lies at the centre of a green belt region that extends into the wider surrounding counties. It is in place to reduce urban sprawl, prevent the towns in the South East Dorset conurbation from further convergence, protect the identity of outlying communities, and preserve nearby countryside. This is achieved by restricting inappropriate development within the designated areas and imposing stricter conditions on permitted building.

Poole has areas of green belt to the north and west of the district, mostly on the fringes of the shared border with the Purbeck and East Dorset districts. These cover landscape features and greenfield facilities including the rivers Stour and Sherford and their floodplains, the Stour Valley Way, Canford Heathland, Dunyeats Hill and Corfe and Barrow Hill nature reserves, Upton Country Park, Pergins Island, and the Wimborne District Society of Model Engineers miniature railway.

The small communities at Merley, Canford Magna, Oakley and Oakley Hill are separated from the main urban area, and while inset, are not covered by green belt. However, the isolated hamlets of Knighton, Merley Hall and Ashington are 'washed over', and development is limited in these locations. A specific function of the restrictions is to prevent further urban encroachment towards Wimborne Minster, to help maintain its historic character and surroundings.

== Demography ==
Religion	%
Buddhist	0.16
Christian	74.34
Hindu	0.15
Jewish	0.32
Muslim	0.41
No religion	16.23
Other	0.32
Sikh	0.03
Not stated	8.03

Age	Percentage
0–4	5.2
5–14	12.2
15–29	16.0
30–44	21.5
45–64	24.8
65+	20.3

Poole merges with several other towns to form the South East Dorset conurbation which has a combined population of over 465,000, forming one of the South Coast's major urban areas. In the 2011 census, the population of the borough of Poole was 147,645, an increase from 138,288 in 2001. The town has a built-up area of 25 square miles (65 km^{2}), giving an approximate population density of 5,532 inhabitants per square mile (2,136/km^{2}) in 60,512 dwellings. The population has grown steadily since the 1960s, inward migration has accounted for most of the town's growth and a significant part of this has been for retirement. Housing stock has increased by over 100 per cent in the past 40 years from 30,000 in 1961 to approximately 62,700 in 2004. Compared to the rest of England and Wales, Poole has an above-average number of residents aged over 65 (20.3%), but this is less than the Dorset average of 22.2%. The largest proportion of the population (24.8%) is between the ages of 45 and 64, slightly above the national average of 23.8%. Population projections have predicted a continual growth; a population of 151,481 is estimated by 2016.

The district is overwhelmingly populated by people of a White ethnic background, 95.98% of residents are of White British ethnicity, well above the rest of England at 86.99%. Minority ethnic groups (including those in White ethnic groups who did not classify themselves as British) represent 4.0% of Poole's population. The largest religion in Poole is Christianity, at almost 74.34%, slightly above the United Kingdom average of 71.6%. The next-largest sector is those with no religion, at almost 16.23%, also above the UK average of 15.5%.

The average house price in Poole is high compared to the rest of the UK and the surrounding south-west region. The average price of a property in Poole in 2008 was £274,011; detached houses were on average £374,150, semi-detached and terraced houses were cheaper at £226,465 and £217,128 respectively. An apartment or flat costs on average £216,097, more than any other part of Dorset. The average house prices in Poole are boosted by those in Sandbanks which had the fourth-most expensive house prices in the world in 2000; in 2007 the average house price was £488,761. A study in 2006 by the National Housing Federation reported that Poole was the most unaffordable town in which to live in the UK.

Population growth in Poole since 1801
Year	1801	1811	1821	1831	1841	1851	1861	1871	1881	1891	1901	1911	1921	1931	1941	1951	1961	1971	1981	1991	2001
Population	6,682	6,752	9,021	9,401	9,901	10,595	12,152	13,710	15,267	20,446	29,068	41,344	50,024	60,527	71,089	83,494	94,598	107,204	117,133	135,066	138,299
% change	–	+1.1	+33.6	+4.2	+5.3	+7	+14.7	+12.8	+11.4	+33.9	+42.2	+42.2	+30	+30	+17.5	+17.5	+13.3	+13.3	+9.3	+15.3	+2.4
Source: A Vision of Britain through Time

== Economy ==
Poole's employment structure
Sector	Poole	Dorset	Great Britain
Agriculture	0.1%	0.4%	0.9%
Energy and Water	1.1%	0.6%	0.8%
Manufacturing	16.8%	13.4%	13.4%
Construction	3.3%	4.0%	4.5%
Services	78.7%	81.7%	80.5%

Poole's economy is more balanced than the rest of Dorset. In the 1960s, prosperity was fuelled by growth in the manufacturing sector, whereas the 1980s and 1990s saw expansion in the service sector as office-based employers relocated to the area. The importance of manufacturing has declined since the 1960s but still employed approximately 17% of the workforce in 2002 and remains more prominent than in the economy of Great Britain as a whole. Sunseeker, the world's largest privately owned builder of motor yachts and the UK's largest manufacturer, is based in Poole and employs over 1,800 people in its Poole shipyards. Other major employers in the local manufacturing industry include Lush, Siemens and Ryvita. Poole has the largest number of industrial estates in South East Dorset, including the Nuffield Industrial estate, Mannings Heath, Arena Business Park, Poole Trade Park and the Branksome Business Centre.

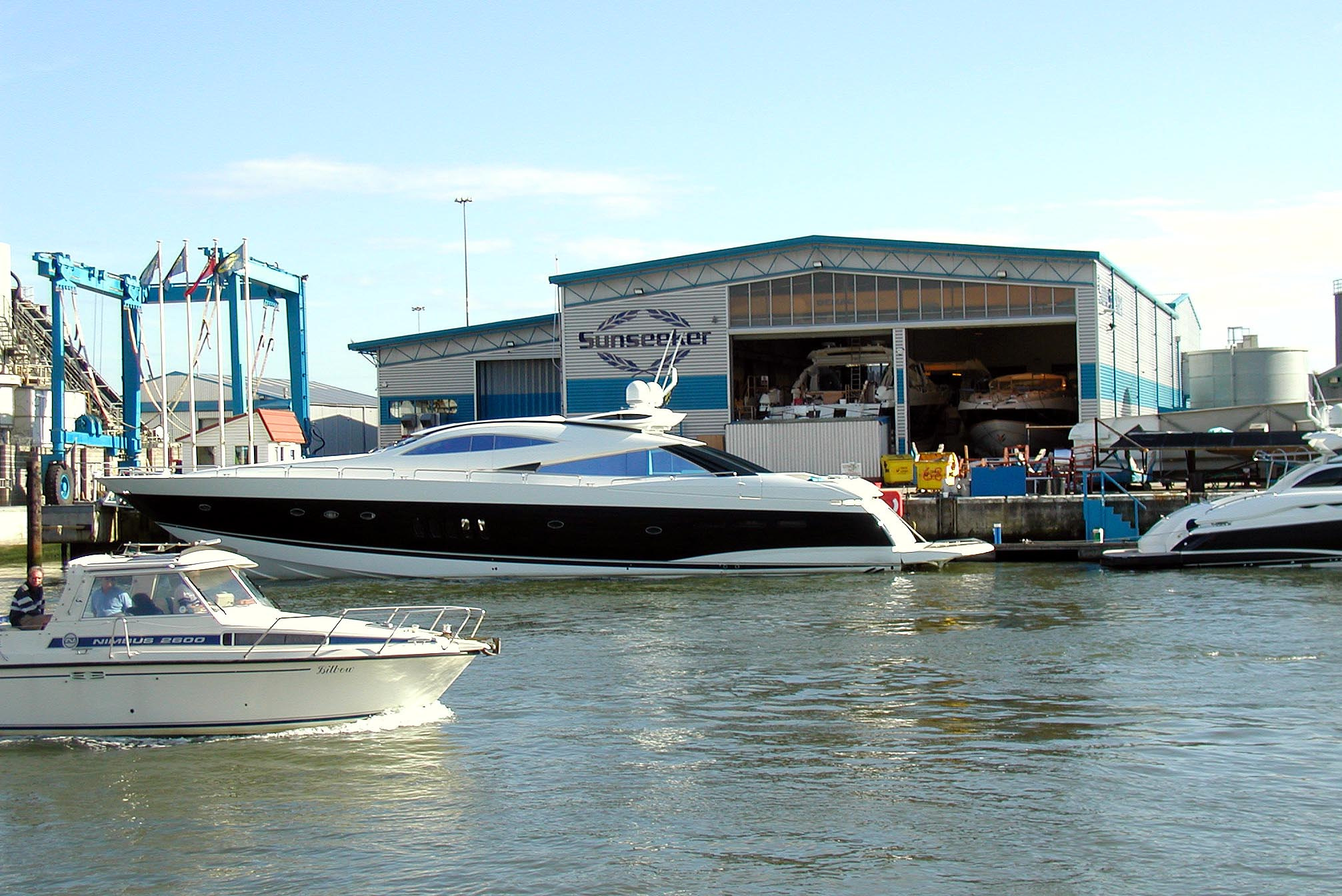
The Sunseeker shipyards opposite Poole Quay

The service sector is the principal economy of Poole; a large number of employees work for the service economy of residents or for tourists. During the 1970s, Poole's less restrictive regional planning policies attracted businesses wishing to relocate from London. These included employers in the banking and financial sector, such as Barclays Bank (who operated Barclays House as a regional headquarters in Poole), American Express Bank and the corporate trust division of Bank of New York Mellon. Other important service sector employers include the national headquarters and college of the Royal National Lifeboat Institution (RNLI), the UK headquarters of Fitness First, Bournemouth University and Arts University Bournemouth. Poole is also the headquarters for clothing company Animal, watch manufacturer Elliot Brown Watches, cosmetics manufacturer Lush, and Merlin Entertainments, the world's second-largest theme park operator after Disney. The Dolphin Shopping Centre is Poole's main retail area and the largest indoor shopping centre in Dorset. It opened in 1969 as an Arndale Centre and underwent three major refurbishments in 1980, 1989 and 2004. The centre provides 47,000 square metres (510,000 sq ft) of retail space with 110 stores and two multi-storey car parks with 1,400 parking spaces. A pedestrianised high street with shops, bars, pubs and restaurants connects the Dolphin Centre with the historic Old Town area and Poole Quay. Tourism is important to the Poole's economy and was worth an estimated £158 million in 2002. Poole's Harbour, Quay and the beaches are some of the main attractions for visitors. Visitor accommodation consists of hotels, guest houses and bed and breakfast rooms located around the town, particularly in Sandbanks and the town centre.

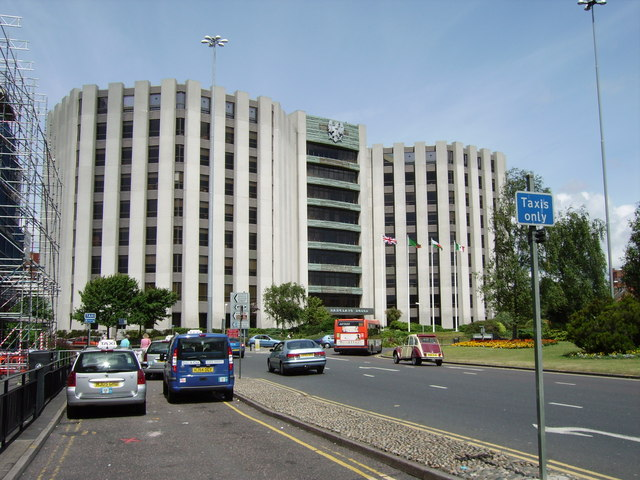
Barclays House in the town centre

Poole is served by the Port of Poole. Since the 1970s, Poole has become one of Britain's busiest ports. Investment in new port facilities in Hamworthy and the deepening of shipping channels allowed considerable growth in cross-channel freight and passenger traffic. The port is a destination for bulk cargo imports such as steel, timber, bricks, fertiliser, grain, aggregates and palletised traffic. Export cargoes include clay, sand, fragmented steel and grain. Commercial ferry operators run regular passenger and freight services from Poole to Cherbourg, St Malo and the Channel Islands. The Royal Marines operate out of the harbour at RM Poole, established in Hamworthy in 1954. The base is home to special forces unit the Special Boat Service and a detachment of the Royal Marines Reserve. In 2008, 105 fishing boats were registered and licensed to the port and held a permit issued by the Southern Sea Fisheries District Committee (SSFDC) to fish commercially. It is the largest port in terms of licences in the SSFDC district which covers the coastline of Dorset, Hampshire and the Isle of Wight, and one of the largest registered fishing fleets in the UK. However, the fleet is gradually declining because of rising fuel costs and restrictive fishing quotas introduced by the European Union. A large number of unlicensed boats also operate charted or private angling excursions.

== Landmarks ==
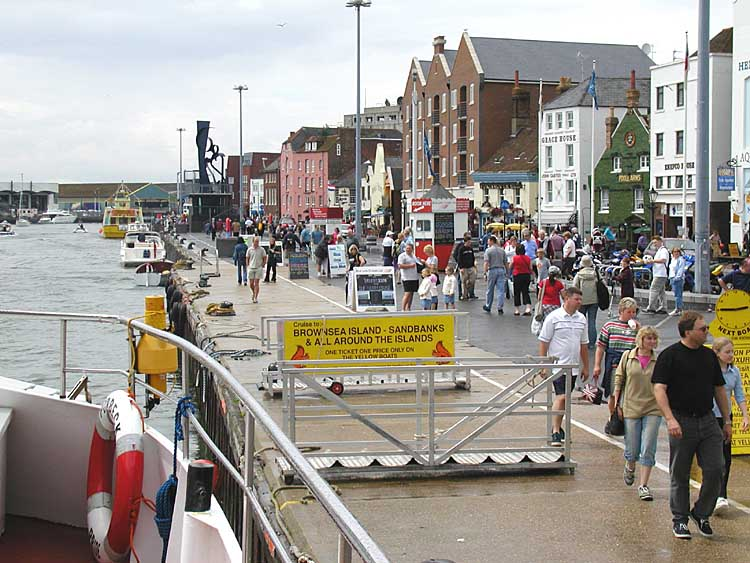
Poole Quay, once a busy centre of maritime trade, has become increasingly popular with tourists

Poole Quay is a visitor attraction to the south of the town centre lined with a mixture of traditional pubs and listed buildings alongside new bars, redeveloped warehouses and apartment blocks. Once the busy centre of Poole's maritime industry, all port activities moved to Hamworthy in the 1970s as the Quay became increasingly popular with tourists. The Grade II* listed Customs House on the quay-front was built in 1814 and now functions as a restaurant and bar. Nearby the Grade I listed Town Cellars, a medieval warehouse built in the 15th century on the foundations of a 14th-century stone building, houses a local history centre. Scaplen's Court, another Grade I listed building, also dates from the medieval era. Poole Pottery has been redeveloped into an apartment block. Boats regularly depart from the quay during the summer and provide cruises around the harbour and to Brownsea Island, the River Frome and Swanage. Public artworks along the Quay include Sea Music – a large metal sculpture designed by Sir Anthony Caro, and a life-size bronze sculpture of Robert Baden-Powell created to celebrate the founding of the Scout Movement on Brownsea Island. At the western end of the quay, near the mouth of Holes Bay, is Poole Bridge. Built in 1927, it is the third bridge to be located on the site since 1834.

Poole Guildhall has played a varied part in the history of the town. A Grade II* listed building, the Guildhall was built in 1761 at a cost of £2,250. The new building included an open market house on the ground floor and a courtroom and offices for the town council on the first floor and has also been used as a court of record, magistrates' court, court of admiralty and a venue for quarter sessions. Between 1819 and 1821 the building was consecrated as a parish church while the old St. James Church was pulled down and replaced with the present church. During the Second World War, the building was used as a canteen and meeting room for American soldiers before the invasion of France. The showers and washing facilities installed at this time were later converted into public baths which were used until the 1960s. The building was converted for use as the town museum between 1971 and 1991 but stood empty for the next 16 years. After a renovation project funded by Poole Borough Council, the restored Guildhall opened in June 2007 as a Register Office for weddings, civil partnerships and other civic ceremonies.

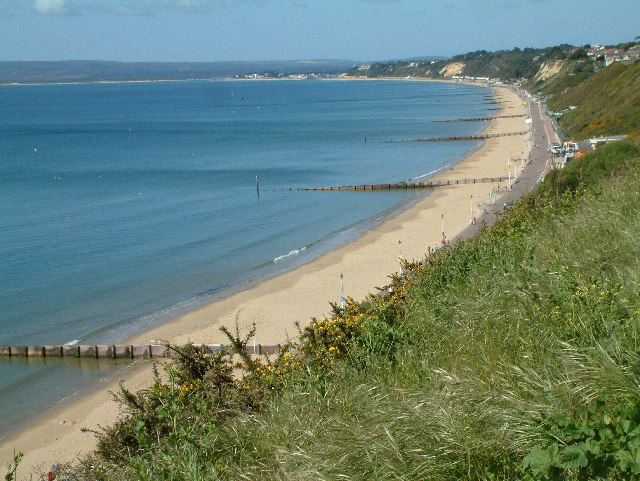
Poole Bay and the beaches of Poole and Bournemouth

Poole has several urban parks – the largest is Poole Park adjacent to Poole Harbour and the town centre. It opened in 1890 and is one of two Victorian parks in Poole. Designated a Conservation Area in 1995 and awarded a Green Flag in 2008, the park comprises 44.3 hectares (109 acres) of which 24 hectares (59 acres) include the park's human-made lake and ponds. The park contains two children's play areas, a miniature railway, tennis courts, a bowling green, a miniature golf course, an Italian restaurant and an indoor ice rink for children. A cricket field and pavilion at the eastern end are home to Poole Town Cricket Club and water sport activities such as sailing, windsurfing, kayaking and rowing take place on the large lake. A war memorial stands in the centre of the park as a monument to Poole citizens killed during the First and Second World Wars. The park hosts several road races such as the Race for Life and the annual Poole Festival of Running.

Poole's sandy beaches are a popular tourist destination extending 3 miles (4.8 km) along Poole Bay from the Sandbanks peninsular to Branksome Dene Chine at the border with Bournemouth. The beaches are divided into four areas: Sandbanks, Shore Road, Canford Cliffs Chine and Branksome Chine. Poole's beaches have been awarded the European Blue Flag for cleanliness and safety 21 times since 1987, more than any other British seaside resort and in 2000 the Tidy Britain Group resort survey rated Poole's beaches among the top five in the country. Along the seafront, there are seaside cafés, restaurants, beach huts and numerous water-sports facilities. Royal National Lifeboat Institution Beach Rescue lifeguards patrol the coastline in the busy summer season between May and September.

== Religious sites ==
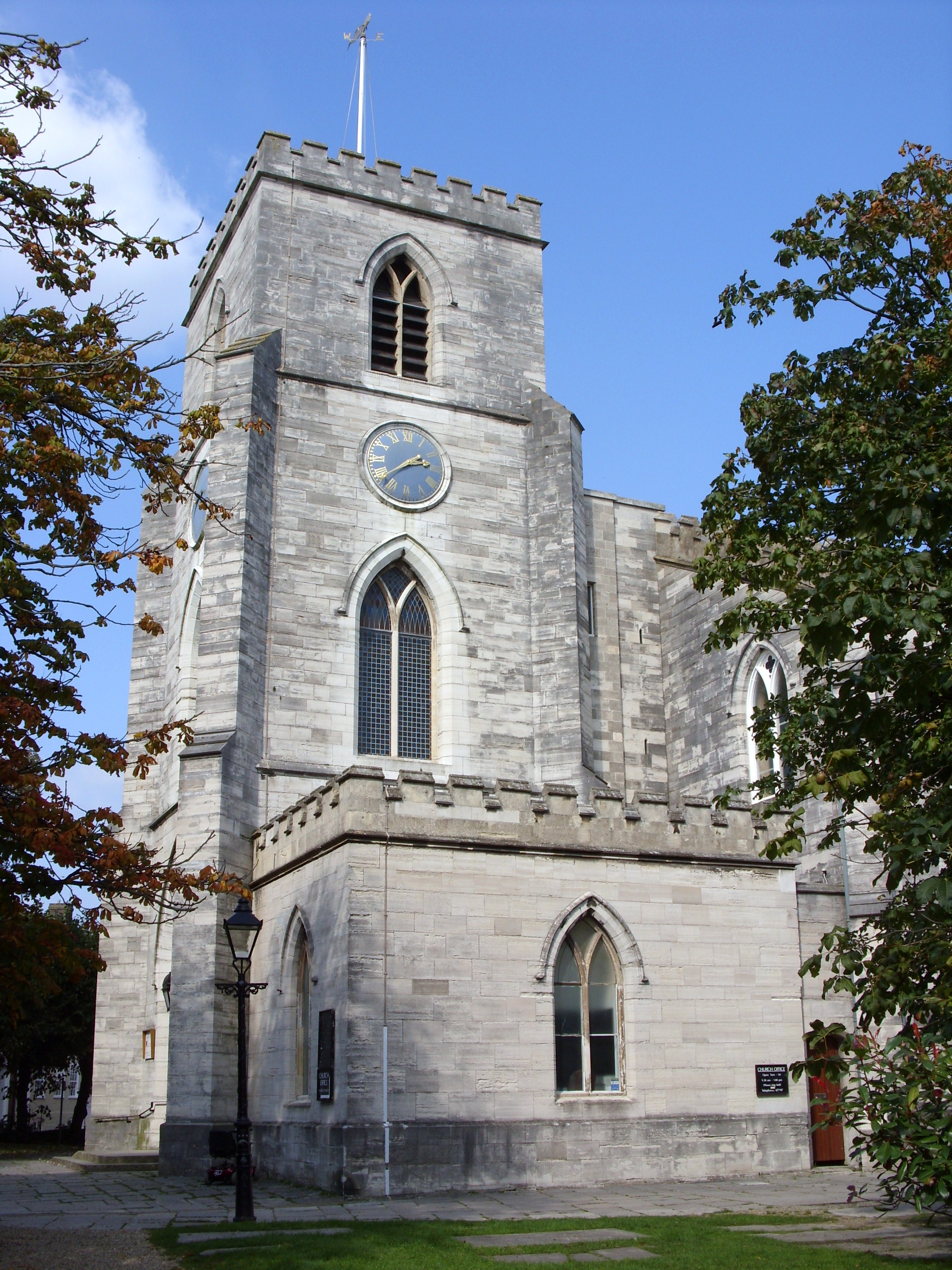
The Parish Church of St. James, built in 1819.

Poole falls within the Church of England Diocese of Salisbury and the Roman Catholic Diocese of Plymouth. Poole has many sites of Christian worship including five Grade II* and five Grade II listed churches, but no notable sites of worship for any other major religious groups. The Grade II* St James' Church is a simplified Gothic Revival style Church of England parish church in the Old Town which was rebuilt in 1820. The previous church on the site was first mentioned in documents from 1142 and had been extensively rebuilt in the 16th century, but in 1819 it was deemed structurally unsafe by a surveyors report. The United Reformed Church hall, also in the town centre, is a Grade II* building built in 1777. The other Grade II* churches are: St. Peter's Parish Church in Parkstone which was first built in 1833 and replaced in 1876; St Dunstan of Canterbury Orthodox Church, also in Parkstone, an Antiochian Orthodox church, formerly the Anglican Church of St Osmund, in a Neo-Byzantine style building; and the Parish Church of St. Aldhelm in Branksome, built by the architects Bodley and Garner in 1892 in the Gothic Revival style. Described by English Heritage as "one of Poole's most important landmarks", the Gothic Revival church of St Mary's in Longfleet, built in 1833, is one of Poole's Grade II listed churches. There are also two Christadelphian meeting halls in the town.

== Sport and recreation ==
Poole Harbour and Poole Bay are popular areas for recreational pursuits such as: sailing, windsurfing, surfing, kitesurfing and water skiing. The harbour's large areas of sheltered waters attract windsurfers, particularly around the northern and eastern shores. Water skiing takes place in the harbour in a specially designated area known as the Wareham Channel. The waters around the harbour, Poole Bay and Studland Bay are also popular for recreational angling and diving.

The beaches at Sandbanks are often used for sporting events such as the Sandbanks Beach Volleyball Festival, and the annual British Beach polo Championship.

Since 1999, the town's Rossmore Leisure Centre has hosted the GMPD Poole Gymnastics Competition every October with the Holiday Inn Express hosting some of the competitors as well as previously a Disco on the Saturday evening which has since been scrapped, hundreds of competitors from across the country compete each year, the competition celebrated its 20th anniversary in 2019. Following a 2-year hiatus due to the COVID-19 pandemic the competition returned in 2022. It continued until 2026 and is now on another hiatus with the future of the competition unknown due to the retirement of the organisers Dave Balmer and Kay Salter MBE.

=== Sailing ===
Poole Harbour is one of the largest centres for sailing in the UK with a number of yacht clubs such as: East Dorset Sailing Club, Lilliput Sailing Club, Parkstone Yacht Club, Poole Yacht Club, Sandbanks Yacht Company and the Royal Motor Yacht Club.

Parkstone Yacht Club hosted the OK Dinghy World Championships in 2004, the J/24 National Championships in 2006 and the J/24 European Championships in 2007, with the 2020 J24 Worlds hosted here also and are the organisers of Youth Week and Poole Week – two of the largest annual dinghy regattas of their type in the country.

=== Football ===
Poole's oldest football team is Poole Town F.C., a semi-professional team who play in the Southern Football League – the seventh tier of the English football league system. Established in 1880, the team has had erratic success at their level; they have never risen above non-League levels but once reached the third round of the FA Cup. They played at Poole Stadium until 1994 and have since settled at Tatnam Farm, sharing the school playing field with Oakdale Junior School. Poole's other football teams are Hamworthy United, formed in 1970, and play in the Wessex Premier League, and the amateur team Poole Borough F.C. who play in the Dorset Premier League. Poole is one of the largest towns in England without a professional football team.

=== Speedway ===
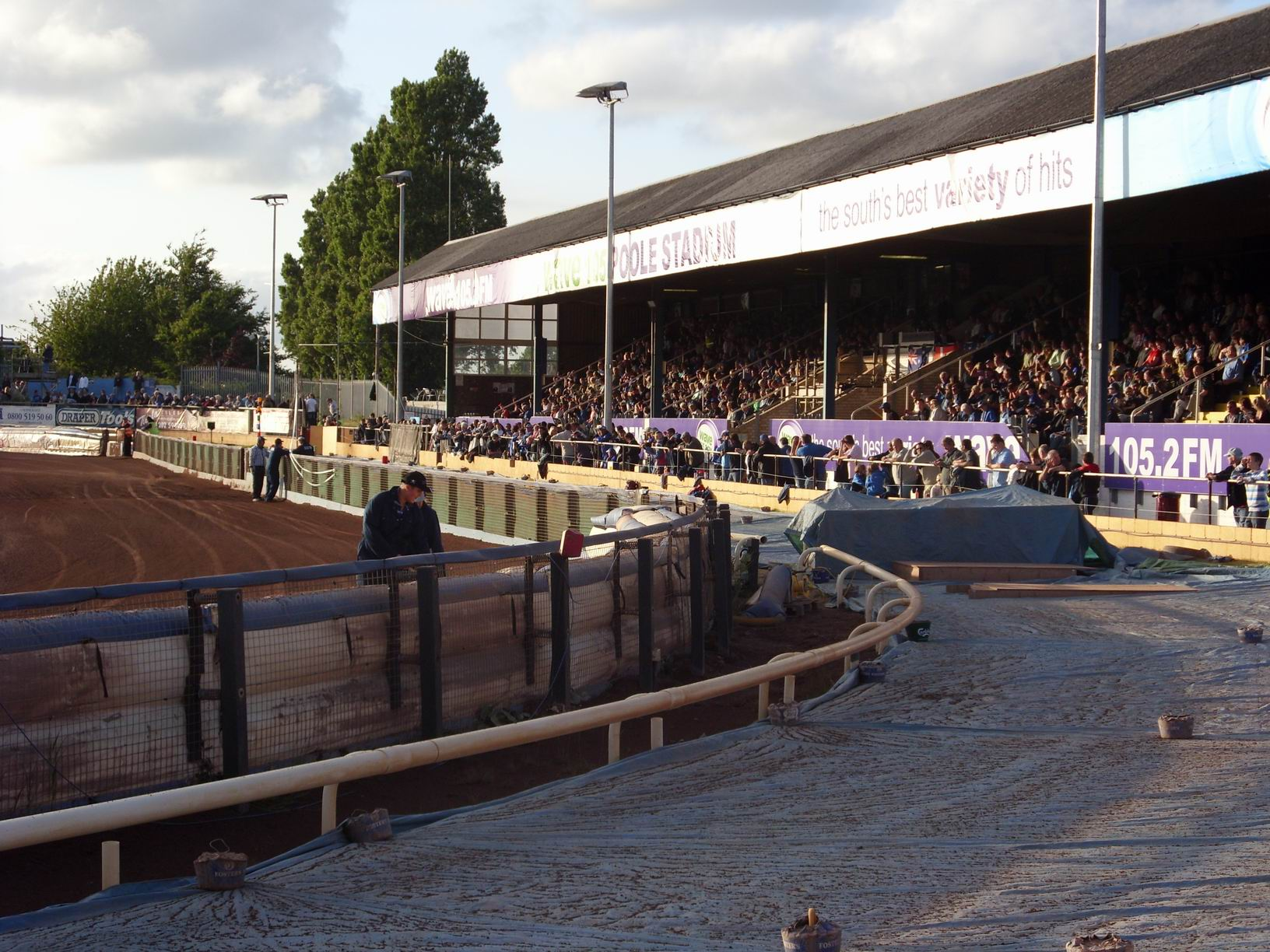
Poole Stadium was a greyhound racing venue and home to the Poole Pirates speedway team

Poole's motorcycle speedway team, the Poole Pirates, were established and began racing at Poole Stadium in 1948 in the National League Division Three. The team now races in the top tier of league racing (the Elite League) which they won in 2008, 2011, 2013, and 2014. Poole Stadium was also a venue for greyhound racing; race nights occur three days a week throughout the year.

=== Scouting ===
Poole has three of the oldest Scout Association groups in the world, 1st Parkstone Air Scout Group holds records dating back to February 1908 and 1st Hamworthy Scout Group has records dating back to October 1908; both groups were formed out of the original Boys' Brigade units that had members take part in the original Scout Camp in 1907. Broadstone Group has records dating back to December 1908 and was home to the first King's/Queen's Scout.

=== Nature parks ===
Working with the Dorset Wildlife Trust, Poole Council has opened two nature parks:

- Holes Bay Nature Park, opened in 2015, includes Upton Country Park. The bay is an important feeding and roosting site for wetland birds.
- Corfe Barrows Nature Park, opened in 2016, is a group of eight natural sites, including Happy Bottom Nature Reserve, that is being jointly managed for wildlife and people in the north of the borough.

=== Walking ===
Poole Tourism has developed and waymarked a number of trails and circular walks, collectively called the Poole Harbour Trails.

=== Cycling ===
Poole has over 50 miles (80 km) of cycle network, including the Castleman Trailway, the Poole Heritage Cycle Route and the Bourne Valley Greenway.

== Culture ==
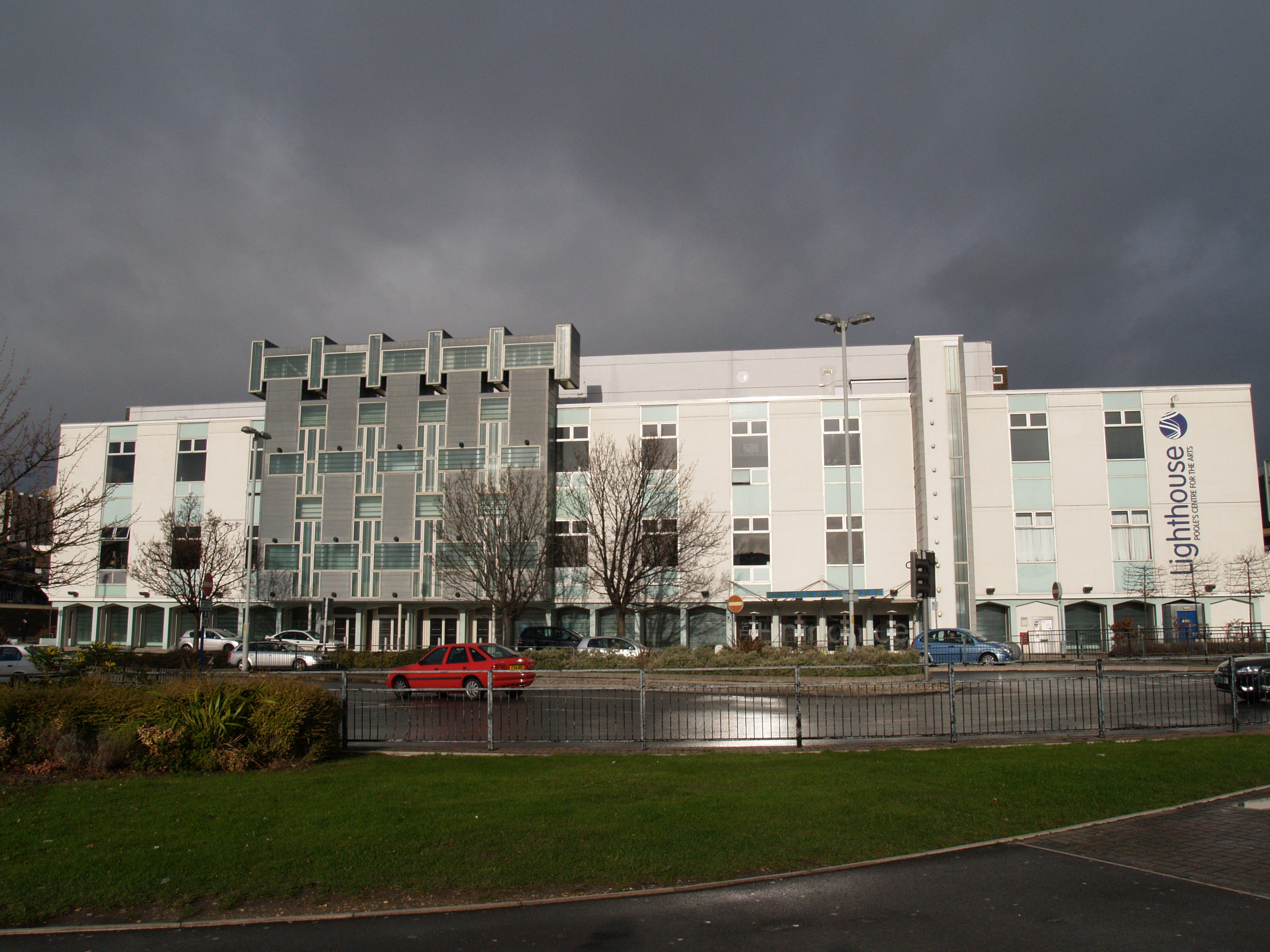
The Lighthouse Arts Centre in Poole is the largest arts centre in England outside London.

The 'Beating of the bounds' is an ancient annual custom first carried out in 1612, which revives the traditional checking of the sea boundaries awarded to Poole by the Cinque Port of Winchelsea in 1364. The Admiral of the Port of Poole (the mayor) and other dignitaries, and members of the public sail from the mouth of the River Frome to Old Harry Rocks to confirm the mayor's authority over the water boundaries of the harbour and check for any encroachments. As there are no physical landmarks that can be beaten at sea, traditionally children from Poole were encouraged to remember the bounds of their town by taking part in the 'Pins and Points' ceremony involving the beating of a boy and pricking of a girl's hand with a needle. In modern times, the acts have been symbolically carried out.

Poole's Summertime in the South is an annual programme providing various events on Poole Quay and Sandbanks from May until September. During June and July, live music, street entertainment and a large firework display take place on Poole Quay every Thursday evening. In August, the entertainment moves to the beaches at Sandbanks.

Built in 1978, Poole's Lighthouse is an arts centre complex that contains a cinema, concert hall, studio, theatre, image lab and media suite and galleries featuring exhibitions of contemporary photography and modern digital art. The venue underwent an £8.5 million refurbishment in 2002, paid for by the Arts Council England, the Borough of Poole and private donations. The centre's concert hall has been the residence of the Bournemouth Symphony Orchestra's main concert series since their former base at the Bournemouth Winter Gardens closed in 1985.

Situated in the centre of the Old Town, Poole Museum illustrates the story of the area and its people and the collections reflect the cultural, social and industrial history of Poole. Displays include the Poole Logboat, a detailed history of Poole from the Iron Age to the present day, and Bethan's Rock. The museum has a floor devoted to the history of Poole Pottery and some of the company's products are on display. Entrance to the museum is free. Poole Museum was closed for refurbishment with and reopened in 2024.

== Transport ==
=== Roads ===
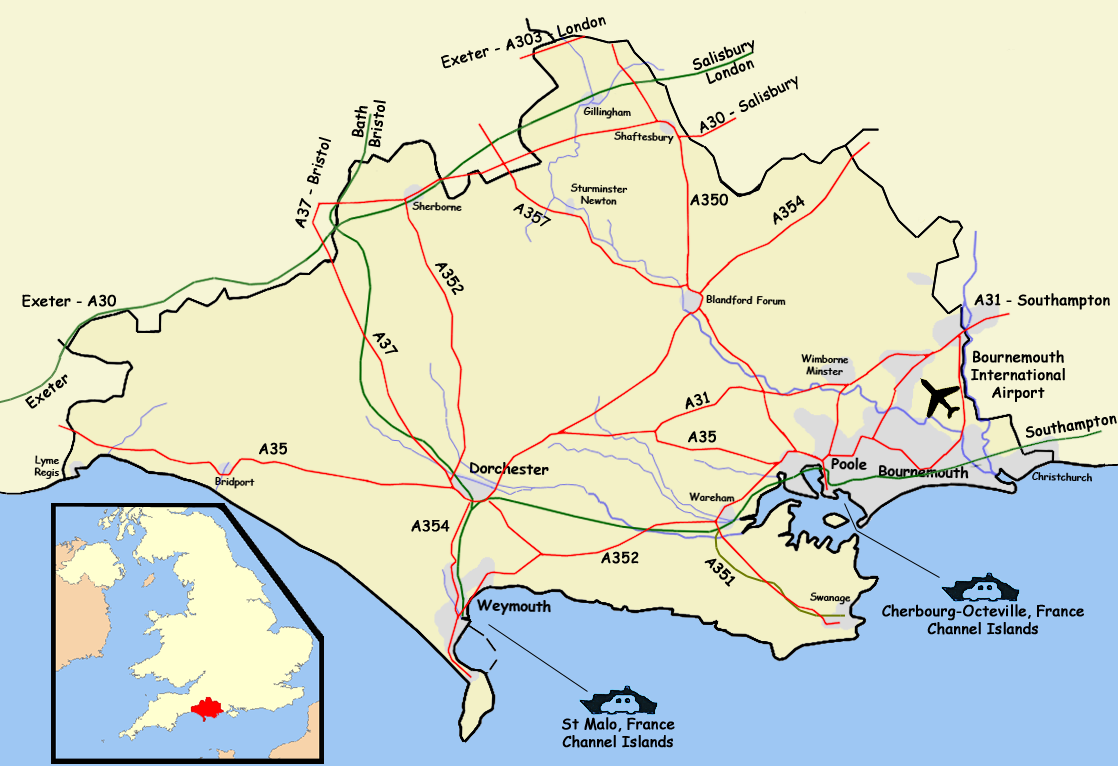
The main transport features in Dorset

The A350 road is Poole town centre's main arterial road, running north along Holes Bay and on to the A35, and as a single carriageway to Bath, Bristol and the M4 motorway although faster access to the motorway may also be gained via the A34 at Newbury. To the east, the A337 road leads to Lymington and the New Forest.

The A35 trunk road runs from Devon to Southampton and connects to the A31 on the outskirts of the town. The A31, the major trunk road in central southern England, connects to the M27 motorway at Southampton. From here the M3 motorway leads to London.

Poole Bridge, a narrow bascule bridge constructed in 1927, connects the town centre and Hamworthy. Approval for a second bridge was given by the Department for Transport in 2006 and the £37 million Twin Sails bridge was completed in 2012.

A road link to Studland and the Isle of Purbeck across the narrow entrance of Poole Harbour is provided by the Sandbanks Ferry. Poole is also home to the Poole Heritage Cycle Route.

The A35, continuing as the A338 from the County Gates Gyratory, connects Poole to Bournemouth then continues north to Salisbury.

=== Buses ===
Bus routes are operated by the following providers:

- Morebus, which is based at the town's bus station; along with its predecessor, Wilts & Dorset, it has served Poole since 1983. It operate routes across Poole, Bournemouth, Christchurch and Salisbury, in addition to operations on the Isle of Purbeck and the New Forest.
- Damory Coaches, a subsidiary of Morebus, operates the X8 to Blandford Forum.
- First Hampshire & Dorset's X54 service runs along a 32-mile (51 km) route along the Jurassic Coast to Wareham, Wool, Lulworth Cove and Weymouth.
- National Express Coaches operates frequent departures to London's Victoria Coach Station. There are also direct services to the Midlands, the North of England and to Heathrow and Gatwick airports.

=== Railway ===
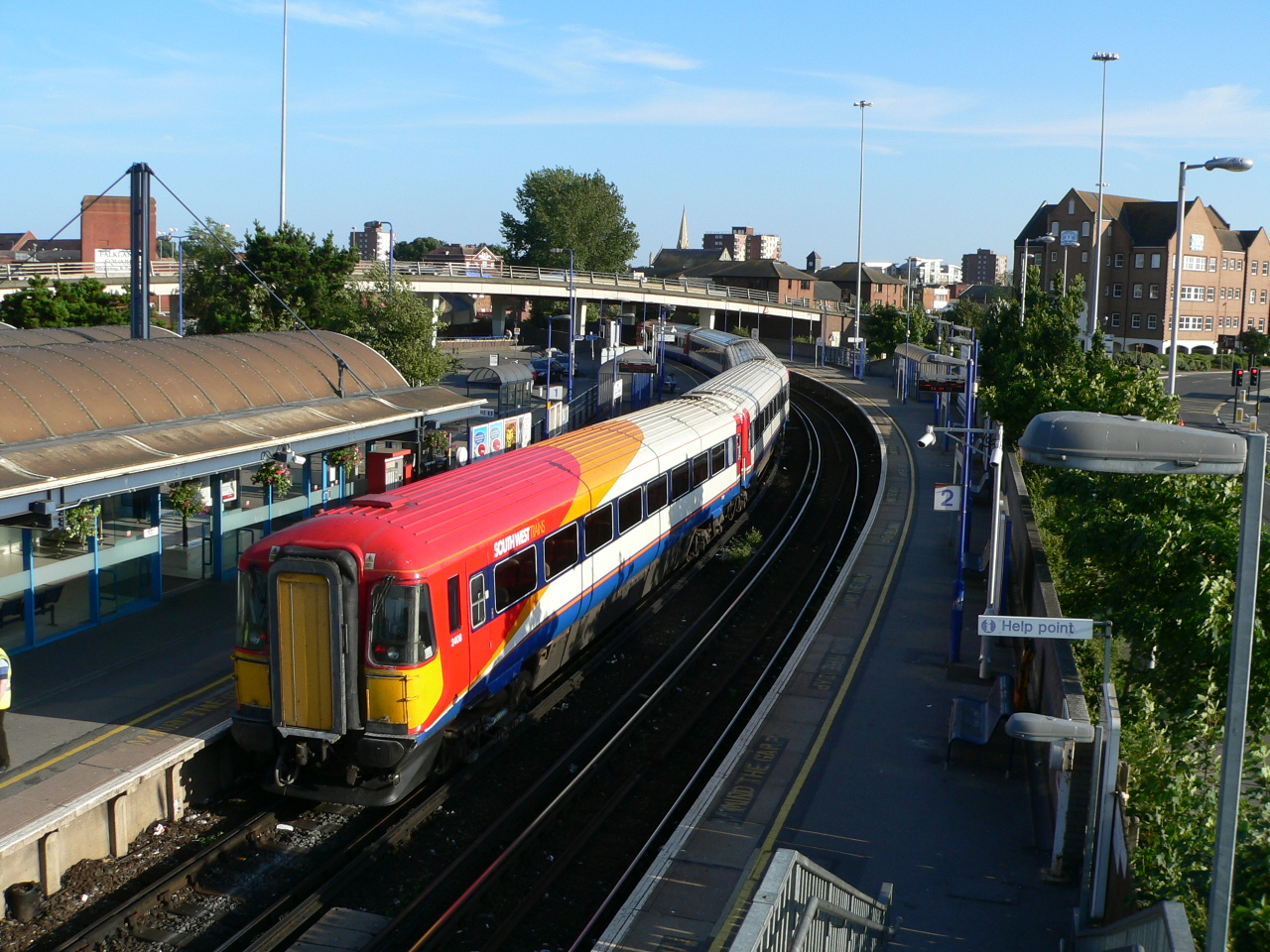
Poole station

There are four railway stations in the Poole area; all are stops on the South West Main Line which links London Waterloo and Weymouth. From east to west, these are Branksome (near the border with Bournemouth), Parkstone, Poole (in the town centre) and Hamworthy.

Services are operated by South Western Railway and generally consist of up to three trains per hour (fast, semi-fast and stopping services) to and from London, with two per hour to and from Weymouth.

=== Ferries ===
Poole is a cross-Channel port for passengers and freight. Ferry services from Poole Harbour to Cherbourg and to St Malo via Guernsey are provided by Brittany Ferries, who operate one-round trip per day using the Barfleur to Cherbourg, and regular sailings to St Malo via Guernsey using the Voyager. Ferries to Jersey are operated by DFDS Seaways using the Levante Jet.

=== Air ===
Bournemouth International Airport is located in Hurn, on the periphery of Bournemouth; it is sited 10 miles (16 km) away from Poole town centre. Ryanair, easyJet and TUI Airways operate from the airport and provide scheduled services to destinations in the UK and Europe.

== Education ==
Poole has eleven infant schools, seven junior schools, ten primary schools, nine secondary schools, three special schools, five private schools and one college of further education. Two of Poole's secondary schools are grammar schools which maintain a selective education system, assessed by the eleven-plus exam. Poole High School is the largest secondary school in Poole with 1,859 pupils. The Bournemouth and Poole College attracts over 16,000 students a year and is one of the largest further education colleges in the country and the leading provider of academic and vocational education in Dorset. It has two centrally located main campuses in Poole and Bournemouth.

From the 2007 General Certificate of Secondary Education (GCSE) results, Poole was ranked 18th out of 148 local authorities in England based on the percentage of pupils attaining at least five A* to C grades at GCSE level including English and maths (54.5% compared with the national average of 46.8%). Parkstone Grammar School was the most successful secondary school in Poole for GCSE results in 2007: 100% of pupils gained five or more GCSEs at A* to C grade including English and maths. Canford School also achieved 100% and Poole Grammar School was the next best performing school with 98%. Poole High School achieved 39% and the worst performing school was Rossmore Community College where only 19% of students achieved five or more A* to C grade results. Poole's grammar schools were also the best performing for A-level results. Poole Grammar School was the 60th most successful school/sixth form in the country in 2007: each student achieved on average 1071.4 points compared to the national average of 731.2. Parkstone Grammar School students averaged 1017.9 points.

Bournemouth University was designated as a university in 1992 and despite its name, the university's main campus (the Talbot Campus) and buildings are within the boundaries of Poole Borough; a smaller campus is situated in Bournemouth itself. Media courses are the university's strength, and recent teaching quality assessments have resulted in ratings of 'excellent' for courses in the areas of communication and media, business and management, catering and hospitality, archaeology and nursing and midwifery. The Arts University Bournemouth was designated as a university in 2012 and is located at Wallisdown. It offers undergraduate, foundation degree, postgraduate and further education courses in contemporary arts, design and media.

== Public services ==
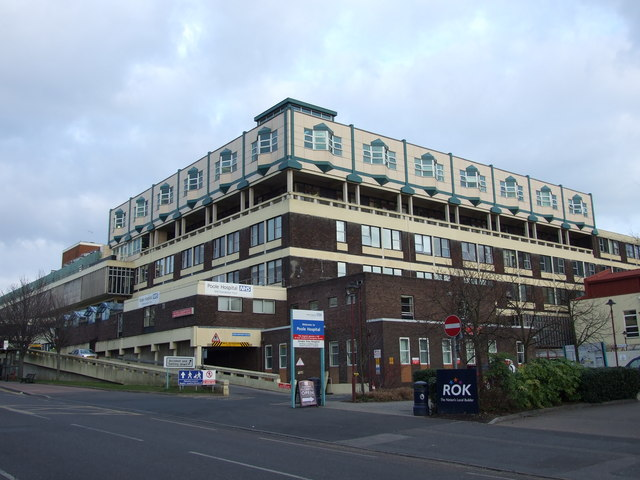
Poole Hospital is the trauma centre for East Dorset.

Policing is undertaken by the Poole and Bournemouth Division of Dorset Police which has one police station in Poole on Wimborne Road in the town centre. Dorset & Wiltshire Fire and Rescue Service provides statutory emergency fire and rescue services for Poole and are based at Poole Fire Station in Creekmoor which opened in 2008. The former fire station on Wimborne Road was demolished in 2008 and was replaced with a joint fire and police divisional headquarters which opened in 2009.

Poole Hospital is a large acute hospital in Longfleet with 638 beds and is part of University Hospitals Dorset NHS Foundation Trust. It opened in 1969 as Poole General Hospital, replacing Poole's Cornelia Hospital which had stood on the site since 1907. The hospital is the major trauma centre for East Dorset and provides core services such as child health and maternity for a catchment area including Bournemouth and Christchurch. Specialist services such as neurological care and cancer treatment are also provided for the rest of Dorset. The South Western Ambulance Service provides emergency patient transport.

Waste management and recycling are co-ordinated by Poole Borough Council in partnership with Viridor. Locally produced inert waste is sent to landfill for disposal. Recycle waste is taken to Viridor's Materials Recycling Facility in Crayford for processing. Poole's distribution network operator for electricity is Scottish and Southern Energy. The water supply and sewerage systems are managed by Wessex Water; groundwater sources in Wiltshire and Dorset provide 75% of drinking water, the rest comes from reservoirs fed by rivers and streams.

== Media ==
Poole has one local newspaper, the Daily Echo, which is owned by Newsquest. Published since 1900, the newspaper features news from Poole, Bournemouth and the surrounding area. Issues are produced Monday through Saturday with an average daily circulation of 13,579. For local television, Poole is served by the BBC South studios based in Southampton, and ITV Meridian from studios in Whiteley. Local radio stations broadcasting to the town include BBC Radio Solent, Greatest Hits Radio South, Heart South, Nation Radio South Coast, Hits Radio Bournemouth & Poole and Hot Radio.

== Notable people ==
The town has been the birthplace and home to notable people, of national and international acclaim. Former residents include the radio disc jockey Tony Blackburn, the artist Augustus John, John Lennon's aunt and parental guardian Mimi Smith, and The Lord of the Rings author J. R. R. Tolkien who lived in Poole for four years during his retirement. Alfred Russel Wallace, the 19th-century explorer, naturalist and co-formulator of the theory of evolution by natural selection, moved to Poole in 1902 when he was 78 years old and is buried in Broadstone cemetery.

Notable people born in Poole include zoologist Thomas Bell, Suede guitarist Richard Oakes, Greg Lake of the band Emerson, Lake & Palmer, author John le Carré, novelist Maggie Gee, stage actor Oswald Yorke, actress Louisa Clein, cellist Natalie Clein, boxer Freddie Mills, writer and actor David Croft, and James Stephen, the principal lawyer associated with the British abolitionist movement. Edgar Wright, the director of films such as Shaun of the Dead, Hot Fuzz and The World's End was born in Poole. Out of the five previous British winners of the Miss World title, two have hailed from Poole: Ann Sidney and Sarah-Jane Hutt. Harry Redknapp, the former Tottenham Hotspur manager, and his son Jamie Redknapp, a former England national football team player, have owned homes in Sandbanks. Former Blue Peter presenter Katy Hill was also born in Poole. Molly Kingsbury who competed in the 2018 Commonwealth Games was born in Poole. The actress Susannah Fielding who featured in This Time with Alan Partridge, was born there. Current Arsenal footballer Ben White was born in Poole as was Chelsea footballer Tino Anjorin. Chad Gould currently lives in Poole. Trampolinist Isabelle Songhurst was born in Poole. Hampshire cricketer Scott Currie and his older brother Bradley Currie were also both born in Poole. Mark Santer, former Anglican Bishop of Birmingham, settled and died in retirement at Poole in 2024.

== Twin towns ==
Poole is twinned with:

- Cherbourg in France (since 1977)

== See also ==
- Compton Acres
- List of Dorset beaches
- List of places in Dorset
- UK coastline
