= Barclays House =

Office block in Dorset, England

Coordinates: 50°43′12.5″N 1°58′50.2″W

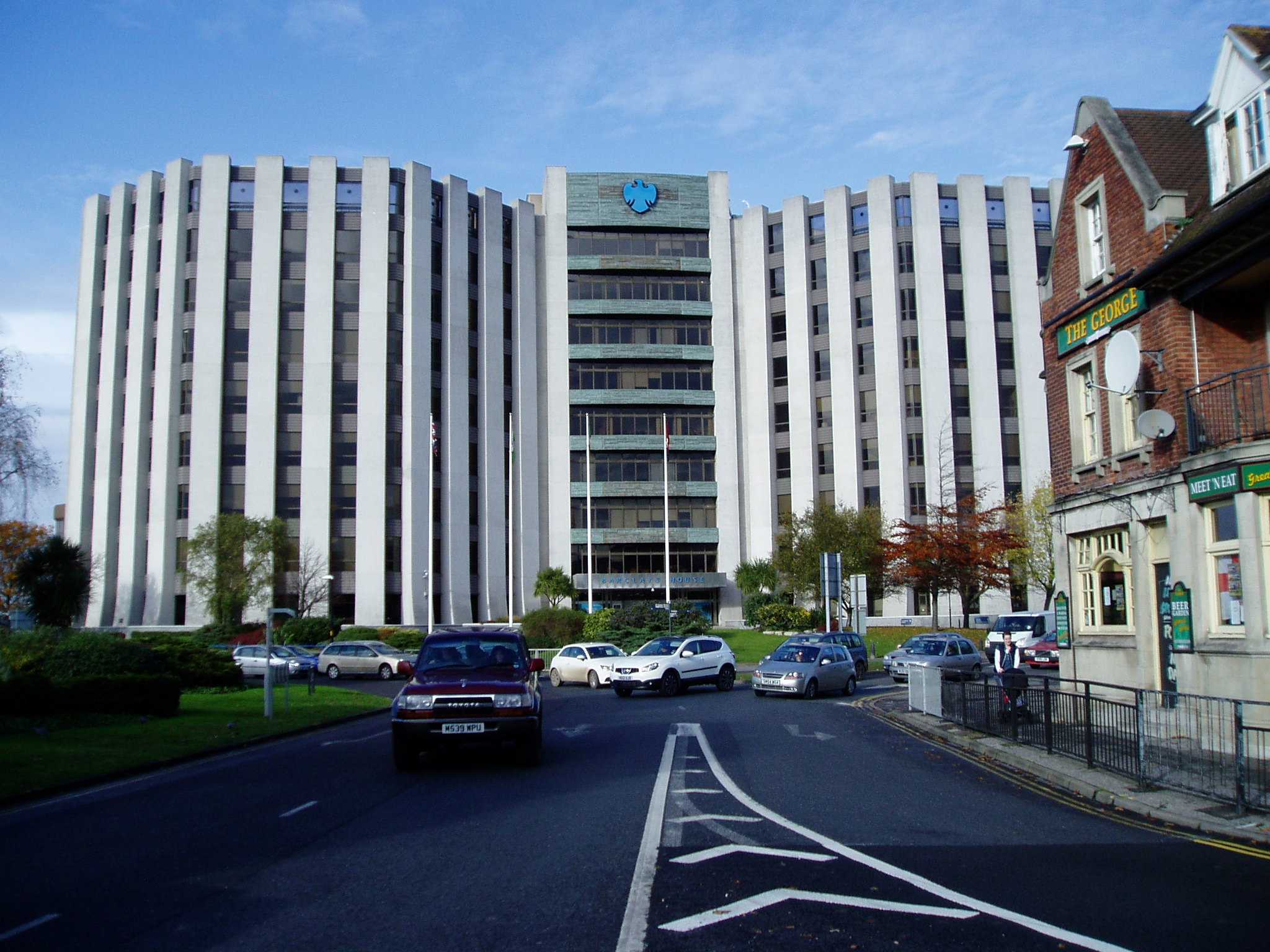
Front elevation pictured in 2012

Barclays House is an office block in Poole, Dorset, in England. It was constructed by Barclays bank from 1972 to 1975 as part of a move to decentralise its offices from London. Barclays left the site in January 2022 and put the structure up for sale by sealed bid auction. The highest bidder was Bournemouth, Christchurch and Poole Council but they withdrew from the purchase in September 2022.

== History ==
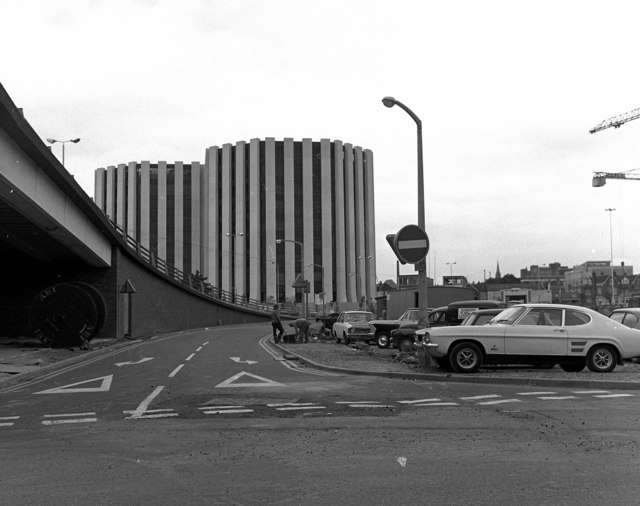
Side elevation in a 1978 photograph

Barclays House was built by Barclays bank as part of a move to decentralise from its London offices, where it had been facing rising costs, and to create jobs locally. The contract was awarded to the John Laing Group and construction was completed between September 1972 and June 1975. The structure, located in Wimborne Road, was designed in the brutalist style by architects Wilson, Mason and Partners. It consists of three main wings, each octagonal in plan, and dominates the town centre skyline.

Barclays first occupied the office in January 1976. The structure's basement is below sea level and is often flooded or damp, which prevented its use by the bank for storage. The structure has also sunk over time due to its significant mass. The front features a 14 feet (4.3 m) eagle (the Barclays logo), made from 1-inch (25 mm) thick aluminium.

In 2016, the building was refurbished as part of its 40th anniversary. On 27 October 2022, the Barclays logo was taken off the front of the building.

On 21 February 2023, Dorset & Wiltshire Fire and Rescue Service were called to a car fire outside the building.

== Proposed redevelopment ==
Plans for Barclays to move out were announced in January 2022, with most of the staff relocating to a new office in nearby Bournemouth. Because of the structural issues any work to convert the structure would likely require multi-million-pound foundation strengthening.

The structure was offered for sale by sealed bid. The highest bid, received late in the process, was from Bournemouth, Christchurch and Poole Council (BCP) the unitary local authority. BCP offered £17 million, almost three times more than the next highest bidder, thought to be Fortitudo (at £6.5 million) who wanted to demolish the structure and build three apartment towers.

BCP did not state their intentions for the site but possibilities included turning it into a headquarters office, to replace their existing facility at Bournemouth Town Hall. Spare office space might have been let to businesses or serve as business incubation space and it was possible that the 1,100-space car park might be used as a park and ride facility.

Before finalising its offer, the council planned to undertake a £195,000 due diligence process, to include structural surveys and an assessment of demolition costs. Demolition might be problematic as the structure has housed peregrine falcon nests. The BCP bid came as a surprise to most local councillors. Opposition councillors have queried the financial security of any renovation plan, which would need to be funded by borrowing.

In September 2022 the council announced that the building and car park required more work than they had expected and would not proceed with the purchase. In February 2023, boarding was put up around the building and the Bournemouth Daily Echo reported that a new buyer had been found.

In November 2023, proposals for redevelopment to residential use were announced. 362 flats are proposed for the building. According to NHS Dorset, the extra 869 people moving to the area will put pressure on local NHS services.
