= Poole Bridge =

Bascule bridge in Dorset, England

Coordinates: 50.712473°N 1.992543°W

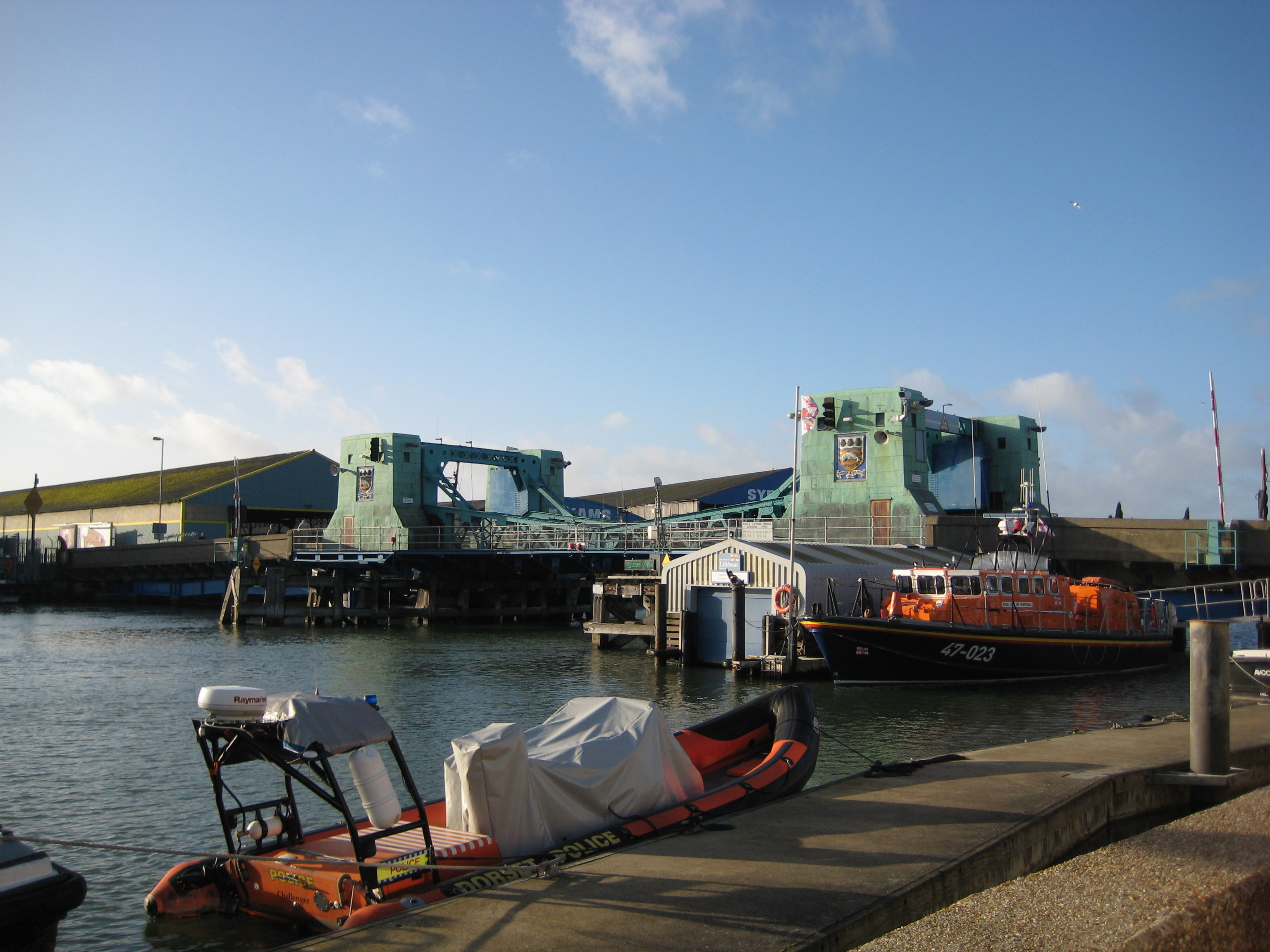
Poole Bridge

Poole Bridge (also known as Poole Lifting Bridge and Hamworthy Bridge) is a bascule bridge in Poole, Dorset, England. Constructed in 1927, the bridge provides a road link across a busy boating channel. In February 2012 a second bridge, Twin Sails bridge, was completed intending to operate in conjunction with the existing bridge

== Location ==
Poole Bridge is situated on the western end of Poole Quay and spans across a narrow channel between Poole Harbour and Holes Bay, a tidal inland lake which lies to the north of the harbour. The bridge provides a road link as part of the A350 road between Poole's town centre and the suburb of Hamworthy, avoiding a journey of 11 kilometres (6.8 mi) around Holes Bay.

== History ==
The existing bridge is the third to be located on the site. William Ponsonby, a Member of Parliament for Poole, was responsible for building the first bridge in 1834. Ponsonby promoted his own act of Parliament, the Poole Bridge Act 1834 (4 & 5 Will. 4. c. xlvi), to build the wooden toll bridge at a cost of £9,612. However, the bridge had a steep gradient that caused problems for horses and in 1885 it was replaced by an iron swing bridge with gentler approach gradients.

It was privately owned and collected tolls up until 1926, when it was purchased by the Borough of Poole and replaced with the third and present bridge which opened in on 11 March 1927. The opening ceremony included a blue ribbon cut by the mayor, as well as a visit from "Father Neptune". It has seven time-tabled lifts a day and another ten unscheduled lifts for commercial boats and it is estimated to lift over 6,000 times a year.

Poole Borough Council assessed the bridge as worn out with cracks appearing in the concrete, closing it for repairs costing £4.2 million for nine months from September 2016. Both sides of the bridge will be demolished and rebuilt, it will be expected to last a further 120 years after the repairs. The bridge reopened in January 2018 after many months delays and a sixteen month closure. On 15 December 2022, the bridge closed to vehicles for emergency repairs.
