= Poole Park =

Park in Poole, Dorset, England

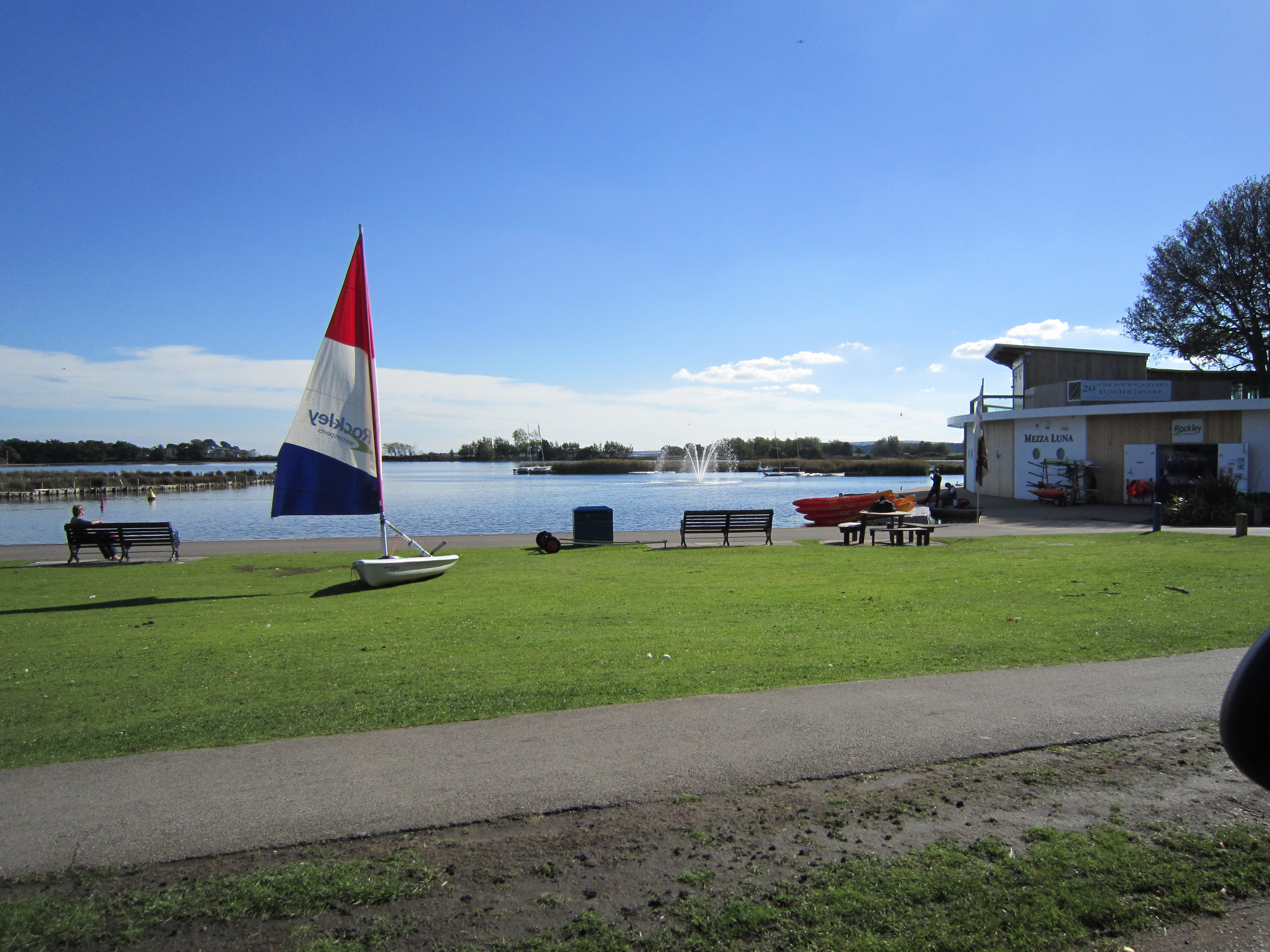
- Interactive map of Poole Park
- Type: Urban park
- Location: Poole, Dorset
- Coordinates: 50.720°N 1.971°W
- Area: 110 acres (45 ha)
- Created: 1890
- Operator: Bournemouth, Christchurch and Poole Council
- Status: Open all year

Poole Park is an urban park adjacent to Poole Harbour in Poole, Dorset, England. The park was opened during the Victorian era and has remained popular with visitors ever since. It is open all year round and hosts a number of events.

== History ==
The park was constructed on land donated by Lord Wimborne and was opened by the Prince of Wales in 1890. The park was built on former meadows and marshes by the town centre adjacent to Poole Harbour and covers an area of 110 acres (45 ha), of which 60 acres (24 ha) include the park's large man-made lake and ponds. Poole Park Zoo was operated from June 1963 until it fell out of favour in February 1994. Although small, at one time it boasted a Himalayan black bear. The park was designated a Conservation Area in 1995, and in 2007 a £2 million project was undertaken to dredge the lake and create five small islands and two raised reed beds. The project also involved the construction of a new restaurant and an indoor ice rink for children.

On 7 January 2015 it was announced that Poole Park would receive £260,000 of Heritage Lottery Fund (HLF). The money will go towards a multimillion-pound redevelopment. The first round of funding for Poole Park follows a fundraising campaign by the Friends of Poole Park. The cash will be spent over the next two years while a detailed research and monitoring project on the boating lake is carried out. The development phase of the project is expected to be completed in late 2016, with the second phase of the bid submitted shortly after.

== Attractions ==
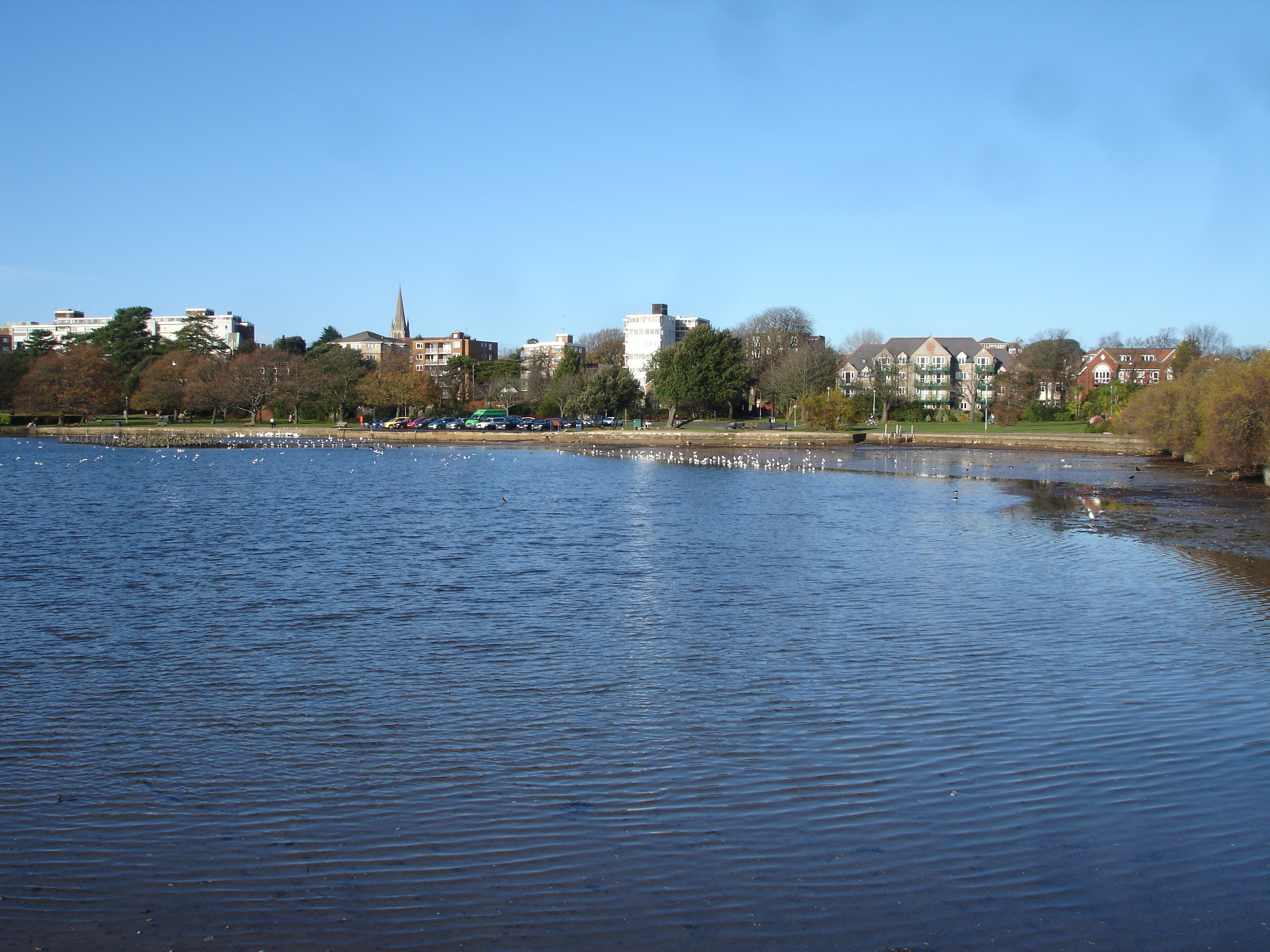
Poole Park lake

Facilities include two children's play areas, tennis courts, a bowling green, miniature golf and Poole Park Railway (a ridable miniature railway). A cricket field and pavilion inside the park are home to the Poole Town Cricket Club, and water sport activities such as sailing, windsurfing, kayaking, rowing and model yacht racing with Poole Radio Yacht Club take place on the lake. The boating lake is around 21 hectares in size and between 1 and 1.5 meters deep. The lake can only be emptyed or filled during spring tides via sluices to the harbour, it is also filled via the local surface water drainage system meaning that the water is brackish (a mixture of salt and freshwater).

Every Saturday morning Parkrun—a free timed 5 km running event—is held at 9:00 am, starting near the water fountain. The run uses flat tarmac paths and flat hard compact gravel within the park. Poole Parkrun regularly hosts over 900 runners each week. On Christmas Day 2019 Poole parkrun set a new attendance record of 1345 runners.
