= Twin Sails Bridge =

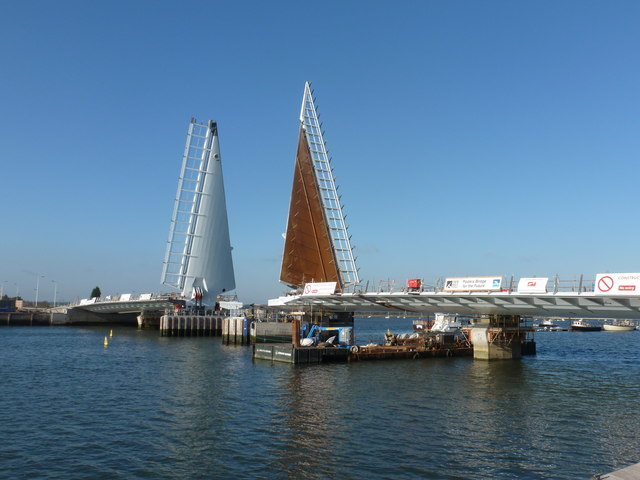
- The Twin Sails Bridge under construction in November 2011
- Coordinates: 50.715282°N 1.992932°W
- Locale: Poole, Dorset

Characteristics
- Total length: 139-metre (456 ft)
- Width: 10.8-metre (35 ft)

History
- Fabrication by: Cleveland Bridge & Engineering Company

Location
- Interactive map of Twin Sails Bridge

The Twin Sails Bridge (also known as The Second Harbour Crossing) is a double leaved bascule bridge in Poole, Dorset, England. The bridge provides a second road link from Poole Town Centre to Hamworthy. The intention is that the bridge will allow development of four major sites, two in Poole Town Centre and two in Hamworthy, including the old power station, which was closed in 1988.

== Location ==
The bridge spans the Backwater Channel which links Holes Bay with Poole Harbour. The bridge and approach roads are connected to the junction of West Quay Road in the east and to urban feeder roads in the west.

== Design ==
The new bridge is intended to operate alongside the existing Poole Bridge with one of the bridges always open for vehicular traffic (except during closures for maintenance or in a marine emergency), the intention is that variable-message signs will direct traffic to the open bridge. The bridge comprises a 10.8-metre (35 ft) wide carriageway with two vehicular lanes and two separate cycle lanes. Additionally two 2.5-metre (8 ft) wide footpaths are provided which cantilever from the bridge. The bridge is constructed in five spans, with a total length of roughly 139 metres (456 ft). The approaches comprise two 27-metre (89 ft) spans, the centre lifting span consists of two triangular leaves that span 23.4 metres (77 ft) between the main bearings to provide a clear channel of 19 metres (62 ft) when open. To permit the passage of boats through the navigation channel, the lift spans were planned to pivot to 88 degrees powered by two hydraulic rams which operate up to 15 times per day and take two minutes to fully open. Two 55-metre (180 ft) high masts are fitted to the lifting leaves, the top two metres illuminated with white LED lights. Four 7-metre (23 ft) high pillars housing the barriers, lights, speakers and traffic controls which link the bridge with the control room are located on the two fixed spans adjacent to the lifting section.

Hochtief (UK) Construction was awarded the £18.5 million contract for the construction of the bridge. The contract for the supply of around 900 tonnes of steel was awarded to Cleveland Bridge UK. Gifford UK (Ramboll) worked with Wilkinson Eyre Architects as lead design consultants. Metamont Ltd installed marine grade stainless steel balustrade including the variable colour DMX lighting.

== History ==
Plans for a new bridge date to the 1980s, with the second lifting bridge concept being suggested in 2000 after a fixed bridge crossing Holes Bay and linking with the A31 was cancelled by the government in 1998. The council submitted detailed plans to Department for Transport in 2004 and following a public inquiry in 2005, the £37 million Twin Sails bridge project was given approval in 2006/7 but construction was initially delayed due to a stalemate between the council and the land owners. After negotiations were settled in August 2009, there was a further delay in the allocation of the £14.14 million government grant which was finally agreed in March 2010.

Construction began in May 2010 with completion and opening planned for late February 2012. Problems with the road surface caused the bridge to remain closed although the opening ceremony and visit by The Princess Royal went ahead in early March 2012. The bridge opened to traffic on 4 April 2012 after the road surface had been relaid, the first motor vehicle crossing at 9.38AM. Problems with the bridge operation continued in the summer of 2012 with delays caused through the barrier operation and lifting mechanism as well as continuing defects in the road surface.

The bridge was closed again beginning 16 November 2018 due to a hydraulic issue with its lifting mechanism.

In 2019 BCP Council, which Poole Borough Council was absorbed by, convened an emergency meeting due to the issues with the bridge becoming "unacceptable". The bridge remained closed due to technical problems up to 2020. These issues are apparently caused by the design as the Twin Sails bridge is unusual compared to a typical bascule bridge.

On 16 January 2023, a section of the bridge snapped due to a technical fault.

Further technical problems caused lengthy closures during 2024 and 2025. These included a three-month closure starting in May 2024, followed by a further prolonged closure from August 2025 with the bridge most recently returning to service on 2 February 2026.
