= Elliot Brown Watches =

British watchmaker

- Type: Private
- Industry: Watchmaking
- Founded: 2013
- Founder: Ian Elliot, Alex Brown
- Headquarters: Dorset, UK
- Website: elliotbrownwatches.com

Elliot Brown Watches is a British watchmaker and purveyor of watches to the British Armed Forces based in Dorset, England founded by Ian Elliot and Alex Brown.

== History ==
Former co-founder of Animal clothing, Ian Elliot started Elliot Brown Watches in 2013 with the head of the company's watch department, Alex Brown.

In 2017, a 'specialist branch of the military', reported to be the Special Boats Service, requested that Elliot Brown design a watch specifically for use by active personnel. The brand produced the 'Holton Professional' which featured a prominent bezel designed to be turned easily by members wearing gloves, and Superluminova markings that whilst highly legible, do not produce a flare that is visible through night vision goggles.

In 2018, the brand's Holton Professional was added to NATO's procurement list allowing it to be issued to service personnel.

== Collaborations ==
Elliot Brown has produced several watches in partnership and collaboration with organisations and companies such as the RNLI, Mountain Rescue England and Wales, and Land Rover.

The company also continues to collaborate on 'unit' watches with branches of the UK military and in response to specific briefs, as with the Holton Profesional and Beachmaster.
