= St James' Church, Poole =

Church in Dorset, England

Coordinates: 50.713°N 1.989°W

St James Church
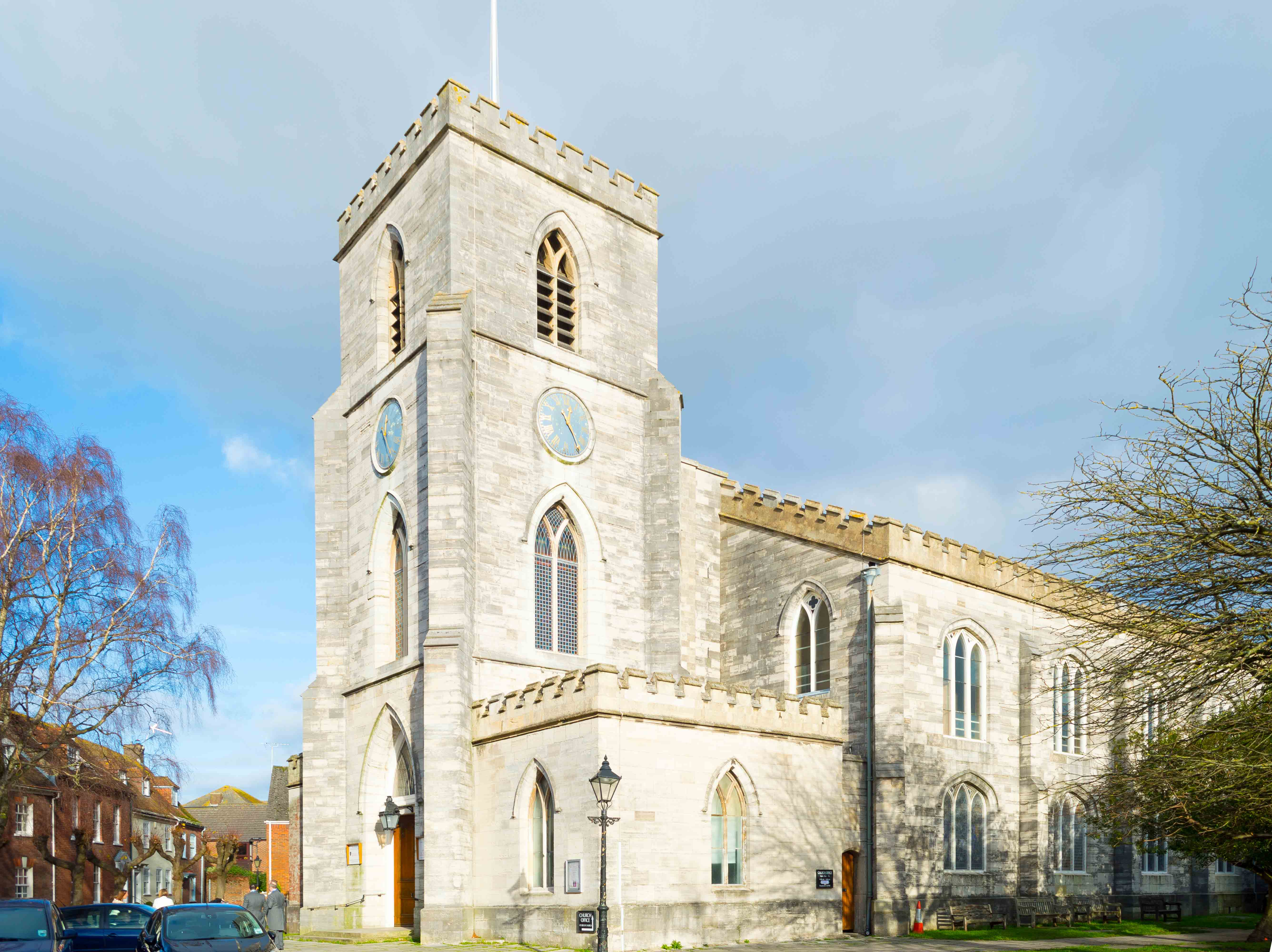
- St James Church
- St James Church
- Denomination: Church of England
- Website: stjamespoole.org

History
- Dedication: James, son of Zebedee

Administration
- Province: Canterbury
- Diocese: Salisbury
- Parish: St James (Poole)

St James is a Church of England parish church in Poole on the south coast of England, in the ceremonial county of Dorset. The church is located in the historic quarter of the town, near Poole Harbour. It is the parish church for the St James sub district of Poole. Today the church is still in use by the local population and has a large playgroup. Lucy Holt is the current minister of the church.

== History ==
The church is named for Saint James, Poole having once been medieval departure point for those embarking for mainland Europe to proceed on the Camino de Santiago. The church has long been associated with the local maritime and fishing trades. It is known locally as 'the fishermen's church'. The church has an unusual weather vane fashioned in the shape of a fish. A church has stood on this spot for around 800 years but at the start of the 19th century, with the wealth of the Newfoundland trade, local merchants and dignitaries subscribed to rebuilding in the Georgian style, which is what we see today. The church is seen as a good example of English Georgian religious architecture. English Heritage have designated it a Grade II* listed building.

It has a small churchyard, predominantly 18th century interments, with a few in the early 1800s. The church used another burial site at Hunger Hill and, after 1855, the new municipal cemetery at Oakdale.

== Bell legend ==
The church has a long tradition of bell ringing. Local lore has it that during Edward VI's reign, the Duke of Somerset ordered eight bells to be sold in aid of Poole's fortification. Unfortunately the bells were lost at sea during passage to Holland.

== Gallery ==
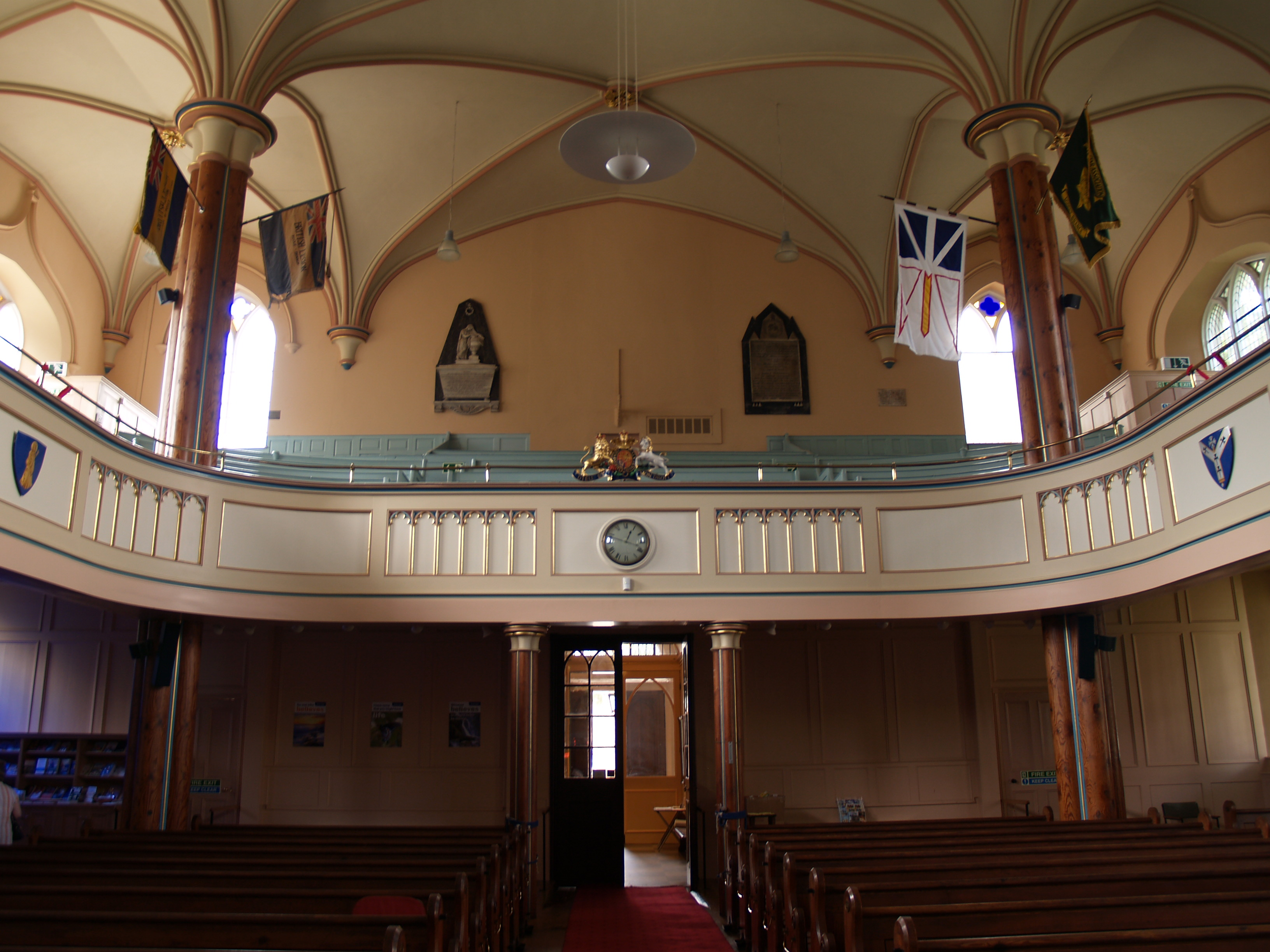
Interior

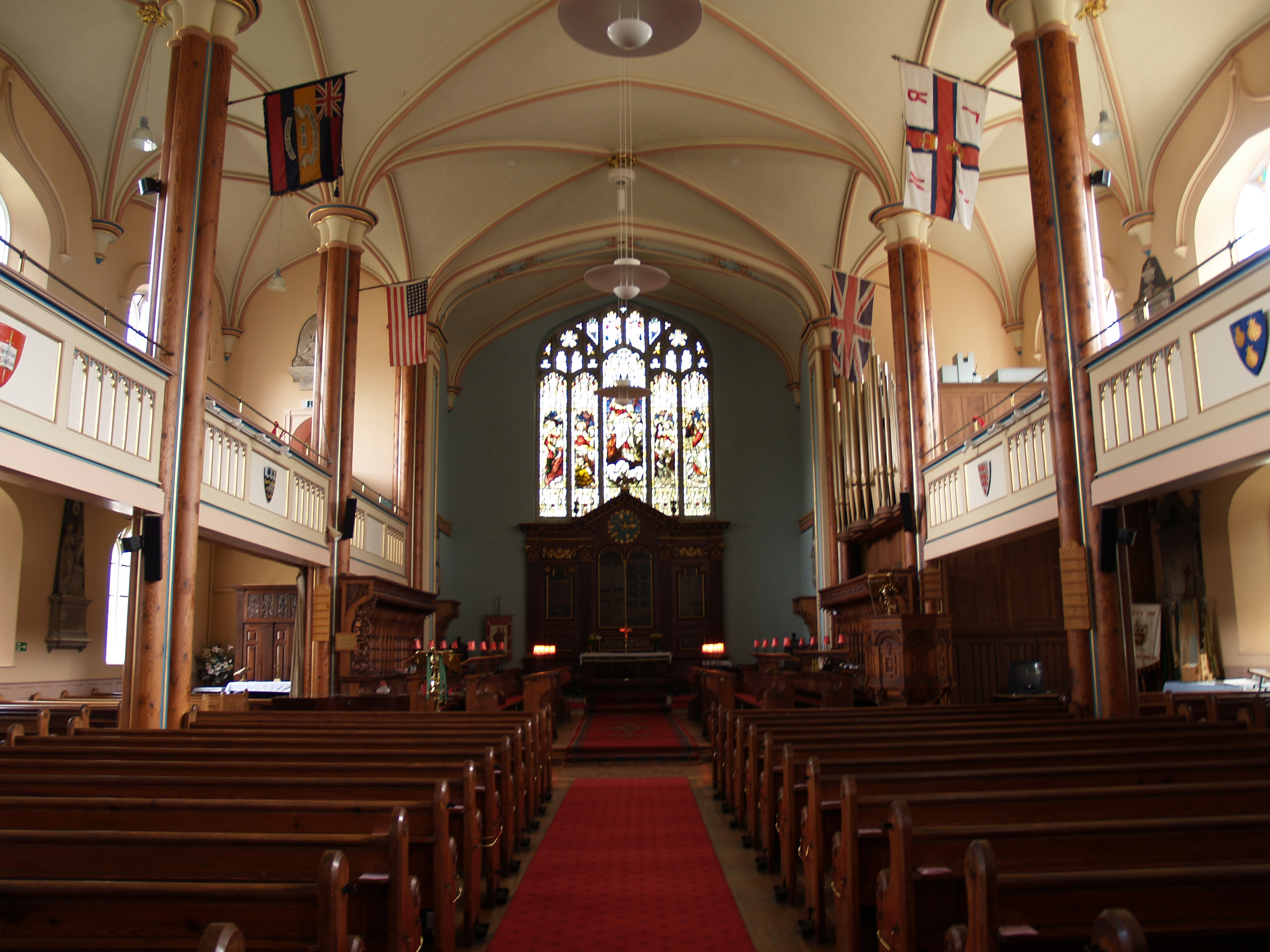
Interior
