= Purbeck miniature railway =

Former miniature railway at Purbeck School

Coordinates: 50.68331°N 2.12281°W

Purbeck Miniature Railway
Overview
- Locale: The Purbeck School, Wareham, Dorset, England
- Dates of operation: 1980s–2013

Technical
- Track gauge: 7 1/4 in (184 mm)
- Length: 250 metres (270 yd)

Purbeck Miniature Railway was a 7 1/4 in (184 mm) gauge miniature railway, located at The Purbeck School near Wareham, Dorset, England. Construction started in the late 1980s in co-operation with the Weymouth & District Society of Model Engineers and has closed due to building works on The Purbeck School.

The line ran from a passenger station at Monument, around the main playground, before crossing a bridge and passing through a tunnel to reach the second station where the main sheds were located. The line was approximately 250 metres (270 yd) long.

== Rolling stock ==
The line built its own rolling stock over the years, inspired by Heywood designs. There was a range of wagons for maintenance purposes including a ballast hopper, weedkiller tank, guards vans and open wagons. The passenger stock also varied from enclosed 4 wheel coaches to open sit astride trolleys.

Petrol and electric locomotives

Built	Name	Type	Image	Current working order
Not available	Dougal	Diesel/petrol	Not Available	Working
Not available	Electric Trolley	Electric	Not available	Sold/no longer owned by the railway
1991	Tram	Electric	Not available	Sold/no longer owned by the railway
1999 - Purbeck Works	Princess	Diesel/petrol	Not available	Working
Not available	Lion	Diesel/hydraulic	Not available	Minor engine fault
2011	Joy/Joyce	Electric	Not available	Minor technical fault
2007 - Constructed by the two Toms	Trolley	Manual	Not available	Working

Steam locomotives

Built	Name	Image	Current working order
1997	Vertical Boiler	Not available	Sold/no longer owned by the railway
Not available	Annie B	Not available	Owner no longer at the railway
Not available	B4	Not available	Working
Not available	Biz	Not available	Working
Not available	Alice	Not available	Sold/no longer owned by the railway
Not available	Benjamin	Not available	Re-construction suspended

== Signalling ==
There was a signal box at Purbeck South which controlled the points and semaphore signals, allowing more than one train to operate at once. At Monument there was a simple arrangement of two platforms and a turntable, which was operated by the guard, shunter or driver.

== Public operating ==
The line used to give rides to the public at car boot events, which were normally held on the first Sunday of each month. The railway has now been dismantled and is no longer in operation.

== Junior Members Club ==
The line runs its own club for young people run by Noel Donnely, a former Purbeck school teacher. Public are welcome to come along and look and ride on the railway at the meetings or on special occasions and open days.
