= List of places on the Jurassic Coast =

Places on the coast of Southern England

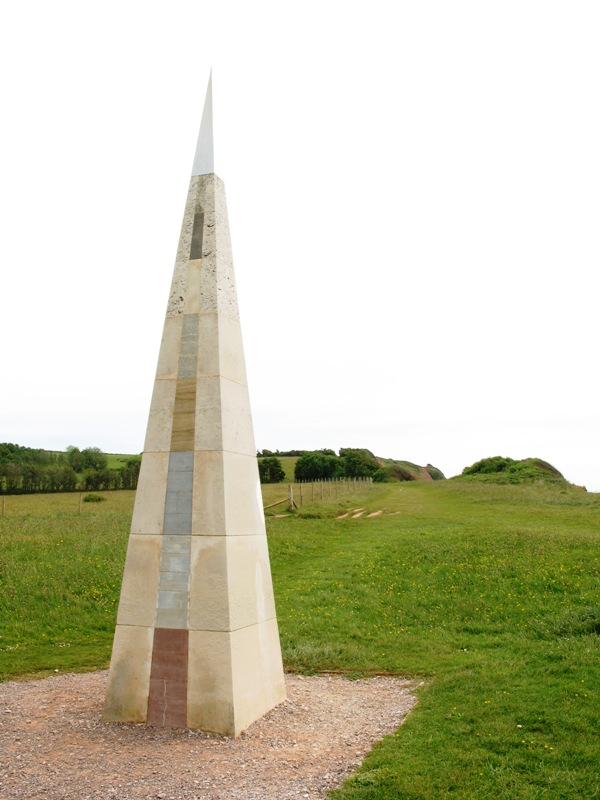
The "geoneedle" is made from different rocks along the Jurassic Coast and marks the western end at Orcombe Point near Exmouth, Devon

The following is a list of places on the Jurassic Coast, a UNESCO World Heritage Site in southern England, located in East Devon and Dorset, from west to east.

Note that this is a more complete list than the template below.

== East Devon ==
- Orcombe Point near Exmouth
- Sandy Bay
- Straight Point
- Otter Cove
- Littleham Cove
- Budleigh Salterton
- Otterton Ledge
- Danger Point
- Black Head
- Brandy Head
- Crab Ledge
- Chiselbury Bay
- Smallstones Point
- Ladram Bay
- Hern Point Rock
- Big Picket Rock
- Tortoiseshell Rocks
- Chit Rocks
- High Peak
- Peak Hill
- Sidmouth
  - Bulverton
- Salcombe Hill Cliff
- Chapman's Rocks
- Salcombe Mouth
- Dunscombe Cliff
- Hook Ebb
- Weston Mouth
- Weston Cliff
- Weston Ebb
- Coxe's Cliff
- Littlecombe Shoot
- Branscombe
  - Branscombe Mouth
- Sherborne Rocks
- Beer Head
- Beer Quarry Caves
- Beer
- Seaton
  - Seaton Hole
  - Seaton Bay
- Haven Cliff
- Culverhole Point
- Humble Point
- Pinhay Bay
- Seven Rock Point

== West Dorset ==
- Poker's Pool
- Lyme Regis
  - Dinosaurland Fossil Museum
  - Lyme Regis Museum
- Lyme Bay
- Canary Ledges
- Black Ven
- Charmouth
  - Heritage Coast Centre
- St Gabriel's Mouth
- Golden Cap
- Seatown
- East Ebb
- East Ebb Cove
- Great Ebb
- Thorncombe Beacon
- Eype's Mouth
- West Bay
- East Cliff
- Burton Cliff
- Burton Bradstock
  - Burton Beach
- Cogden Beach
- West Bexington
- Abbotsbury
  - Abbotsbury Gardens
  - Abbotsbury Swannery
- Chesil Beach
  - Gore Cove
- Chickerell
  - Bennetts Water Gardens

== Weymouth and Portland ==
=== Isle of Portland ===
- Chesil Cove
- Tar Rocks
- Clay Ope
- Hallelujah Bay
- West Cliff
- Blacknor
- Mutton Cove
- Wallsend Cove
- Portland Bill
  - Lighthouse
  - Pulpit Rock
- Portland Raised Beach
- Red Crane
- Cave Hole
- Church Ope Cove
  - Portland Museum
- Jurassica
- Durdle Pier
- King's Pier
- Folly Pier
  - Waterworks
- Salt Pans
- Freshwater Bay
- Balaclava Bay
- East Weare Battery
- East Weare Camp
- East Weare Rifle Range
- Portland Harbour

=== Weymouth ===
- Newton's Cove
- Nothe Gardens
  - Nothe Fort
- Weymouth Harbour
- Weymouth Pier
  - Jurassic Skyline
- Weymouth Beach
- Weymouth Bay
- Greenhill
- Furzy Cliff
- Jordan Hill
- Bowleaze Cove

== West Dorset ==
- Broadrock
- Redcliff Point
- Black Head
- Osmington Mills
- Bran Point
- Perry Ledge
- Ringstead village
  - RAF Ringstead
  - West Ringstead
- Ringstead Bay
  - Burning Cliff

== Purbeck District ==
- White Nothe
- Chaldon Hill
- Bat's Head
- Swyre Head (Lulworth)
- Scratchy Bottom
- Durdle Door
- Man of War Bay
- St Oswald's Bay
- Pinion Rock
- Dungy Head
  - Hambury Tout
- Stair Hole
- Lulworth Cove
- Lulworth Ranges
- Bindon Hill
- Fossil Forest
- Mupe Rocks
- Mupe Ledges
- Mupe Bay
- Black Rock
- Arish Mell

=== Isle of Purbeck ===
- Flower's Barrow
- Cow Corner
- Worbarrow Bay
  - Flower's Barrow
- Worbarrow Tout
- Pondfield Cove
- Gold Down
- Gad Cliff
- Wagon Rock
- Tyneham
- Brandy Bay
- Long Ebb
- Hobarrow Bay
- Broad Bench
- Charnel
- Kimmeridge
  - Oil Field
  - Kimmeridge Bay
  - The Etches Collection
  - Gaulter Gap
  - Clavell Tower
  - Hen Cliff
  - Cuddle
  - Kimmeridge Ledges
- Clavell's Hard
- Rope Lake Head
- Swyre Head
- Egmont Bight
- Egmont Point
- Chapman's Pool
- Emmetts Hill
- St Aldhelm's Head (or St Alban's Head)
  - St. Aldhelm's Chapel
- West Man
- Winspit
- East Man
- Worth Matravers
- Seacombe Quarry
- Seacombe Cliff
- Dancing Ledge
- Blackers Hole
- Anvil Point
- Tilly Whim Caves
- Durlston Head
  - Durlston Country Park
  - Durlston Castle
  - Great Globe
  - Durlston Bay
- Peveril Point
- Swanage
  - Swanage Bay
- Ballard Down
  - Ballard Point
- The Pinnacles
- Parson's Barn
- Old Harry Rocks

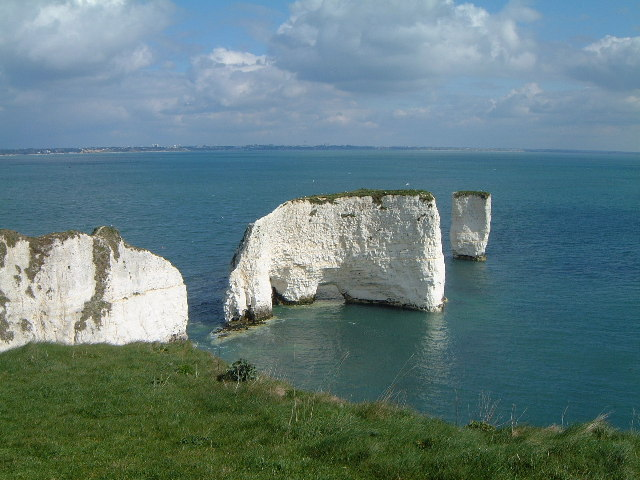
Old Harry Rocks at the eastern end of the Jurassic Coast on the Isle of Purbeck in Dorset

== See also ==
- Purbeck Hills
- Isle of Purbeck
- Geology of Dorset
- Geology of the United Kingdom
- List of fossil sites
- List of Dorset beaches
- South West Coast Path
- UK coastline
