= List of public art in Devon =

This is a list of public art in the Devon county of England. This list applies only to works of public art on permanent display in an outdoor public space. For example, this does not include artworks in museums.

The list can be sorted by clicking on the corresponding arrows in the column titles.

Image	Title / subject	Location and coordinates	Date	Artist / designer	Type	Material	Dimensions	Designation	Wikidata	Notes
	Blue Boy	Princesshay, Exeter 50°43′29.172″N 3°31′39.396″W	c. 1860	John Weston	Sculpture	Painted cast iron		Grade II	Q26557878	A copy, from about 1860, of a statue carved in 1733 of a pupil at St John's Hospital School.
More images	The Deer Stalker	Northernhay Gardens, Exeter 50°43′35.303″N 3°31′43.522″W	1878	Edward Bowring Stephens	Sculpture	Bronze and granite		Grade II	Q26517061	
More images	William Courtenay, 11th Earl of Devon	Northernhay Gardens, Exeter 50°43′36.12″N 3°31′45.48″W	1880	Edward Bowring Stephens	Sculpture	Bronze and granite	3 metres (9.8 ft) high			The statue stood in Bedford Circus prior to World War II.
More images	Francis Drake	Plymouth Road, Tavistock 50°32′43.08″N 4°09′09.82″W	1883	Joseph Boehm	Statue on pedestal with panels	Bronze and granite		Grade II	Q26611707	
More images	Francis Drake	Plymouth Hoe, Plymouth 50°21′55.08″N 4°08′33.9″W	1884	Joseph Boehm	Statue on pedestal	Bronze and granite		Grade II*	Q17554612	Copy of the statue in Tavistock, Devon
More images	Hamilton Macallum memorial	Sea Hill, Beer 50.69705°N 3.09145°W	c. 1896	Edward Onslow Ford	Portrait plaque with surround	Bronze and stone				Second plaque and barometer at rear of structure
More images	Equestrian statue of Sir Redvers Buller	Hele Road, Exeter 50°43′40.67″N 3°32′13.69″W	1902	Adrian Jones	Equestrian statue on pedestal	Bronze and granite		Grade II	Q26558036	
	Georgina Cowper-Temple, Lady Mount Temple	Oddicombe Beach Hill, Babbacombe 50°28′51″N 3°31′01″W	1903		Statue with birdbath	Granite and limestone		Grade II	Q26502882	She lived at the house in Beach Road, which is now the Babbacombe Cliff Hotel.
More images	Bishop Richard Hooker	Cathedral Close, Exeter 50.72312°N 3.53018°W	1907	Alfred Drury	Statue on pedestal	Marble and granite		Grade II	Q26398018	
More images	City of Plymouth war memorial	Plymouth Hoe, Plymouth 50°21′59.74″N 4°08′36″W	1923	William Birnie Rhind	Sculpture with pedestal & surround	Bronze and granite		Grade II	Q26407225	Architects, Thornely & Rooke.
More images	Slapton Sands D-Day Memorial	Slapton Sands 50.28696°N 3.64543°W	1945		Memorial	Stone			Q83188068	Presented by th US Army Authorities to the people of South Hams who left their homes to provide a battle practice area.
More images	The Armada Dial	Armada Way, Plymouth 50°22′16.9″N 4°08′32.9″W	1988	Carole Vincent	Sculpture	Cast concrete with terrazzo and stainless steel	8.23 metres (27.0 ft) high			Commemorating the "Armada 400" celebrations; unveiled by Queen Elizabeth II.
	Year of the Pedestrian	Cary Parade, Torquay 50°27′41.5″N 3°31′34″W	1989	Carole Vincent	Sculpture	Polished concrete				Copies of the sculpture were also commissioned for the town centres in Exeter, Plymouth and Barnstaple.
More images	Royal Air Force Memorial	Plymouth Hoe, Plymouth 50°21′54.914″N 4°8′29.116″W	1989	Pam Taylor	Sculpture	Bronze, Cornish granite and black marble			Q24677174	
	Ekaterine Frolov	Capstone Point, Ilfracombe 51°12′42.4″N 4°07′15″W			Sculpture					In memory of Ekaterine Frolov (1986–2000), a Russian girl studying English in the town, who fell to her death near here.
More images	Sheep Sculpture	Hatherleigh 50°49′13.2″N 4°04′23.1″W		Roger Dean	Sculpture					A memorial to the Exeter Blitz of World War II.
	Armillary Sphere	Near the Custom House, Exeter 50.71873°N 3.53170°W	1990	Roger Dean	Sculpture	Bronze				An armillary sphere, dedicated to Sylvia Bull.
More images	Geoneedle	Orcombe Point 50.60721°N 3.38511°W	2002	Michael Fairfax	Obelisk	Portland stone	5 metres (16 ft) high			Inset with different rock types from along the Jurassic Coast
More images	Exeter Riddle	High Street, Exeter 50°43.4546′N 3°31.7499′W	2005	Michael Fairfax	Sculpture	Stainless steel				Inscribed with riddles from the 10th-century Exeter Book
More images	Historical Panels	Broad Street, Ilfracombe 51.21023°N 4.11608°W	c. 2006	Roger Dean	Sculpture	Bronze				Six reliefs show three scenes from the town, each from the past and in the present day.
	In Memory, May 1942	Roman Walk, Exeter 50°43′27.9″N 3°31′37.2″W	c. 2008	Roger Dean	Memorial	Stainless steel and bronze				Two bronze relief panels commemorating the Exeter Blitz of World War II, inspired by photographs taken the following day.
	Man and Boy	King's Quay, Brixham 50.39715°N 3.51076°W	2016	Elisabeth Hadley	Sculpture	Bronze			Q65091384	Based on "The Wheel", an etching by Arthur Briscoe (1873–1943).
More images	Messenger	Near Theatre Royal, Plymouth 50.3701°N 4.1443°W	2019	Joseph Hillier	Sculpture	Bronze	7 metres (23 ft) high		Q59554834	A female actor crouches in preparation to run onstage.
