= Promontory =

Prominent mass of land that overlooks lower-lying land or a body of water

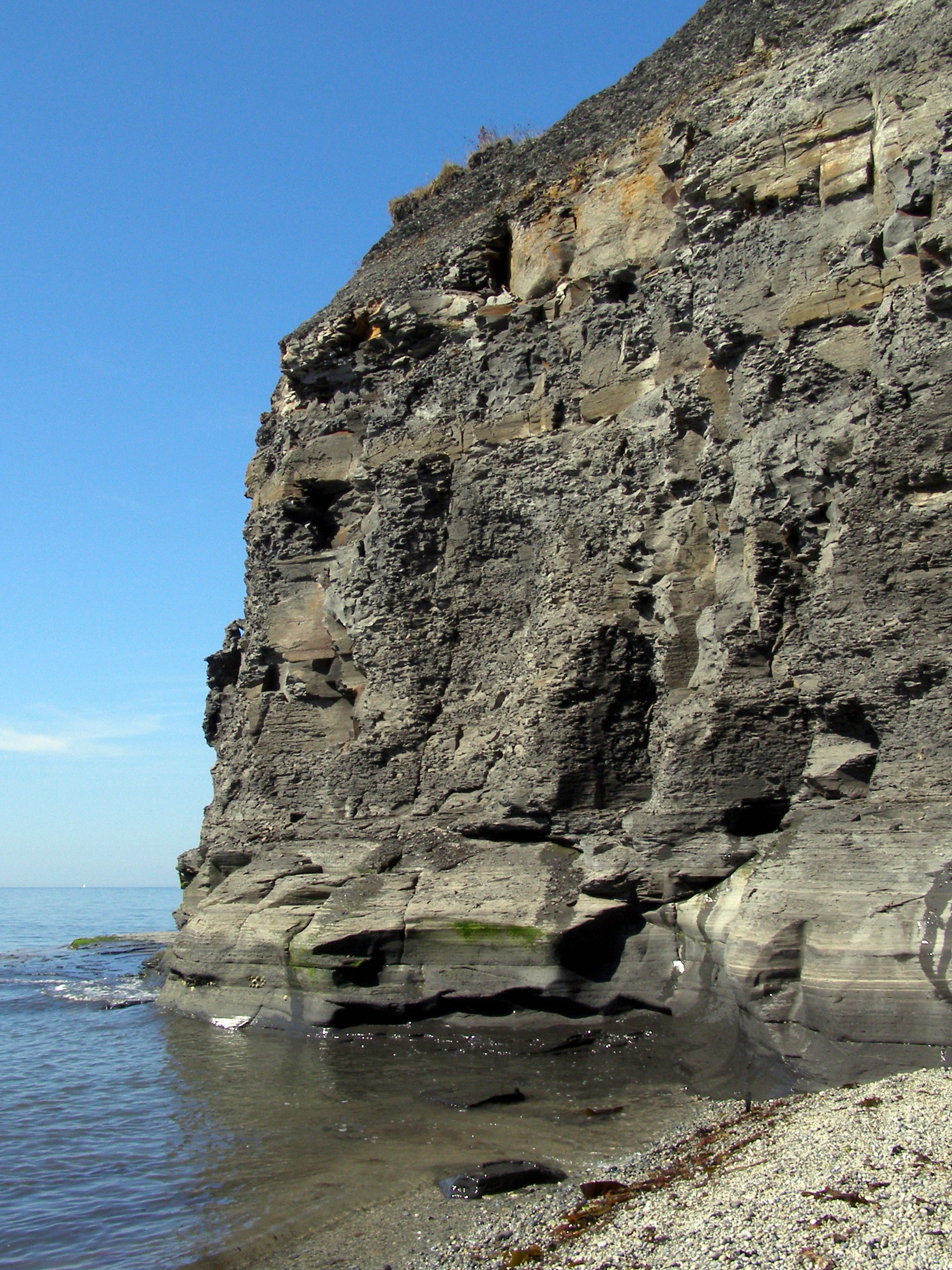
East side of the Freshwater Steps promontory, at the western end of Egmont Bight, Dorset, U.K.

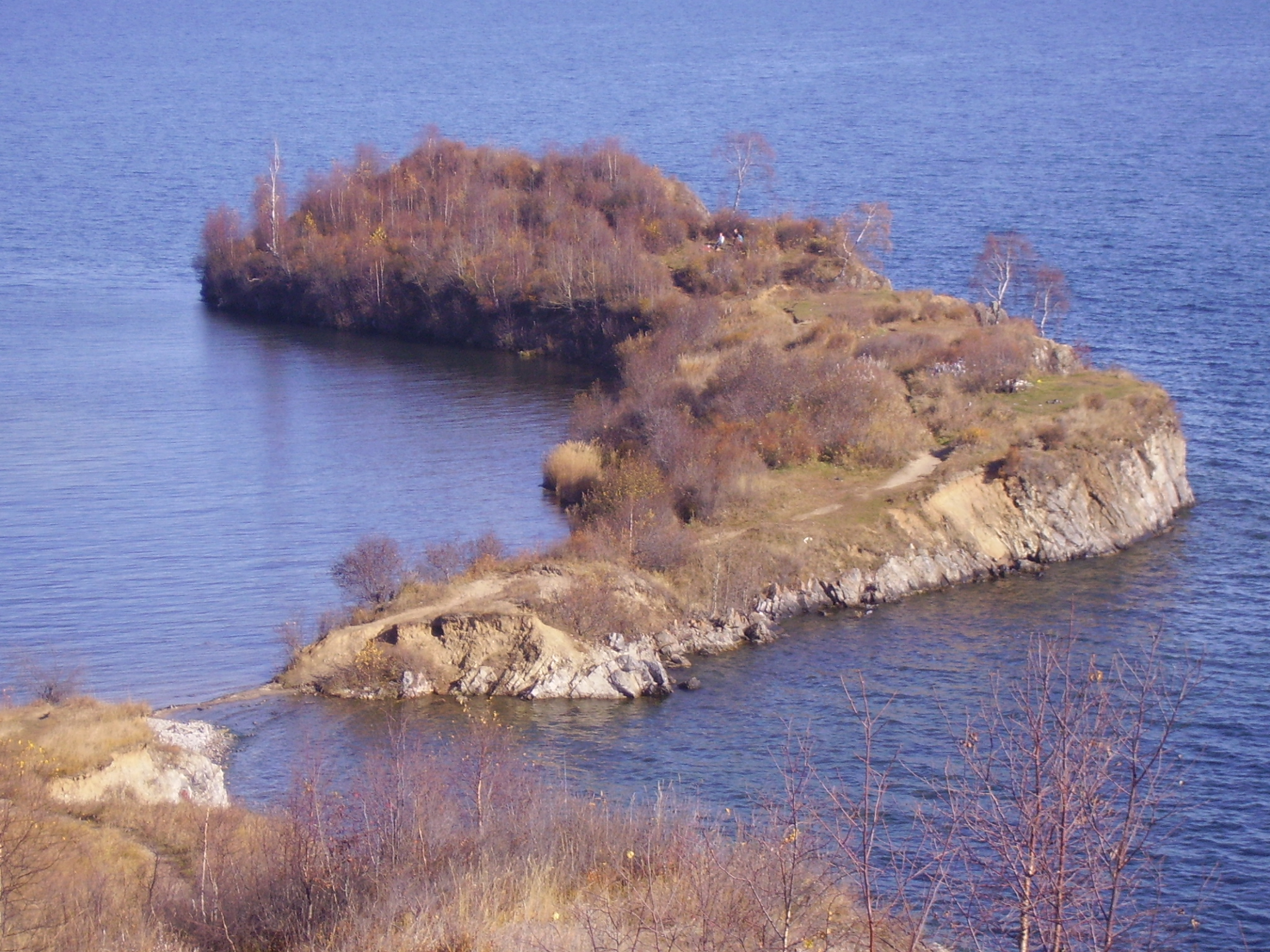
A promontory, on Lake Baikal, Russia

A promontory is a raised mass of land that projects into a lowland or a body of water (in which case it is a peninsula). Most promontories are formed either from a hard ridge of rock that has resisted the erosive forces that have removed the softer rock to the sides of it, or are the high ground that remains between two river valleys where they form a confluence. One type of promontory is a headland, or head.

== History ==
Located at the edge of a landmass, promontories offer a natural defense against enemies, as they are often surrounded by water and difficult to access. Many ancient and modern forts and castles have been built on promontories for this reason.

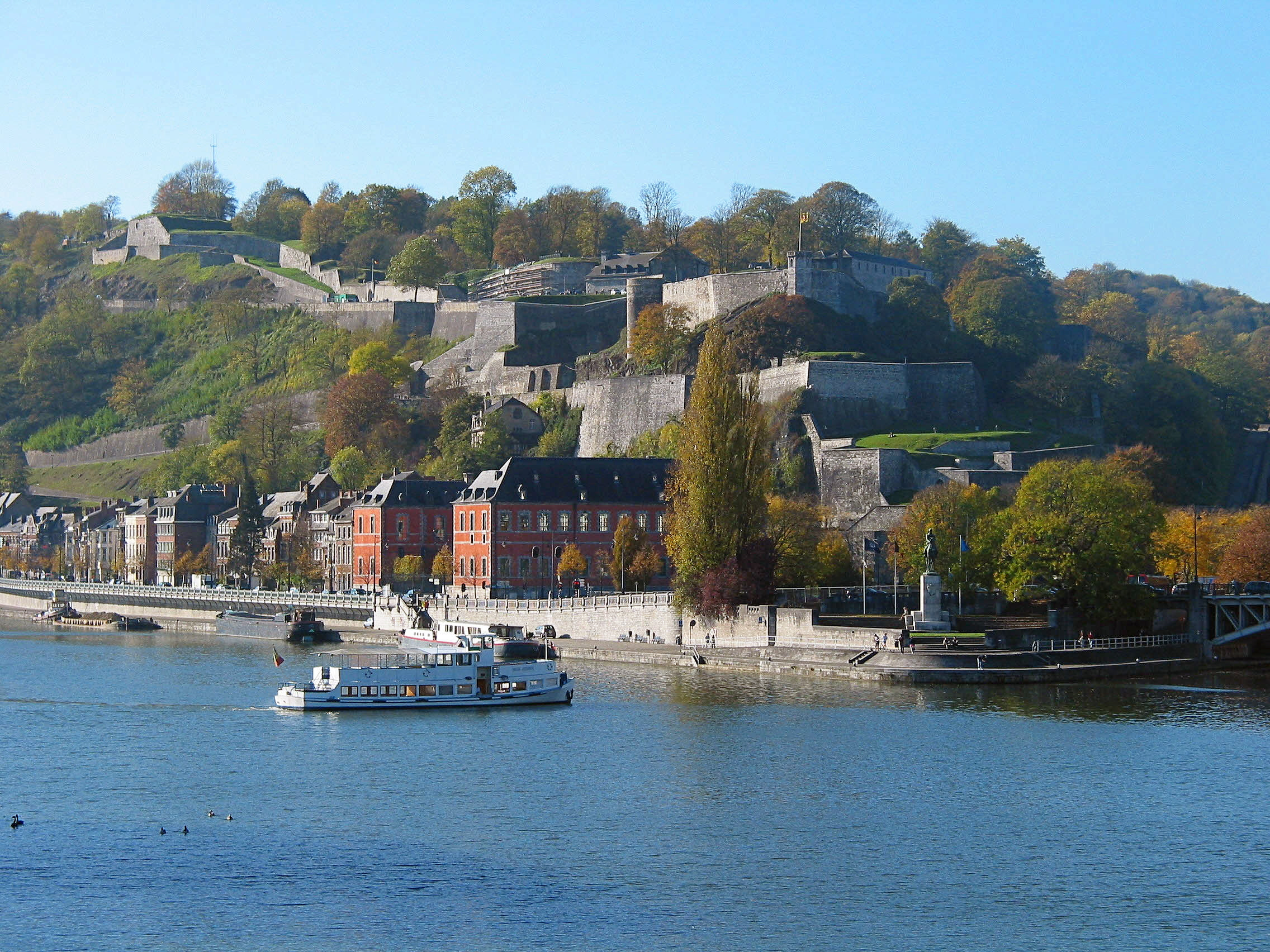
The Citadel of Namur, with the Meuse and the Parliament of Wallonia in the foreground

One of the most famous examples of promontory forts is the Citadel of Namur in Belgium. Located at the confluence of the Meuse and Sambre rivers, the citadel has been a prime fortified location since the 10th century. The surrounding rivers act as a natural moat, making it difficult for enemies to access the fort.

Another example of a promontory fort is Fort Pitt, which was built by the English during the American Revolution on the site of the former Fort Duquesne, which belonged to the French during the French and Indian War. The fort was located at the confluence of the Allegheny and Monongahela rivers, providing an additional layer of defense. The surrounding area eventually became the city of Pittsburgh, Pennsylvania.

In Ireland, many promontory forts were built by the ancient Celts for defense against invaders. These forts were often located on isolated peninsulas or headlands and were difficult to access, making them ideal for defending against enemy attacks.

The ancient town of Ras Bar Balla in southern Somalia is another example of a promontory fort. Located on a small promontory, the town was part of the Ajuran Sultanate's domain during the Middle Ages and was strategically located to defend against potential invaders.

== See also ==
- Headland – Landform extending into a body of water, often with significant height and drop
- Isthmus – Strip of land connecting two larger areas
