= Weston, Devon =

Hamlet in Devon, England

Coordinates: 50.697273°N 3.179426°W

Weston
- Location within Devon
- OS grid reference: SY1688
- District: East Devon
- Shire county: Devon
- Region: South West
- Country: England
- Sovereign state: United Kingdom
- Post town: SIDMOUTH
- Postcode district: EX10
- Dialling code: 01395
- Police: Devon and Cornwall
- Fire: Devon and Somerset
- Ambulance: South Western
- UK Parliament: Honiton and Sidmouth

Weston is a small hamlet near Sidmouth in East Devon, England. It is near the Donkey Sanctuary and less than a mile from the beach at Branscombe; footpaths also give access to the beach at Weston Mouth.
