= Hallelujah Bay =

Bay in United Kingdom

Coordinates: 50°32′52″N 2°27′05″W

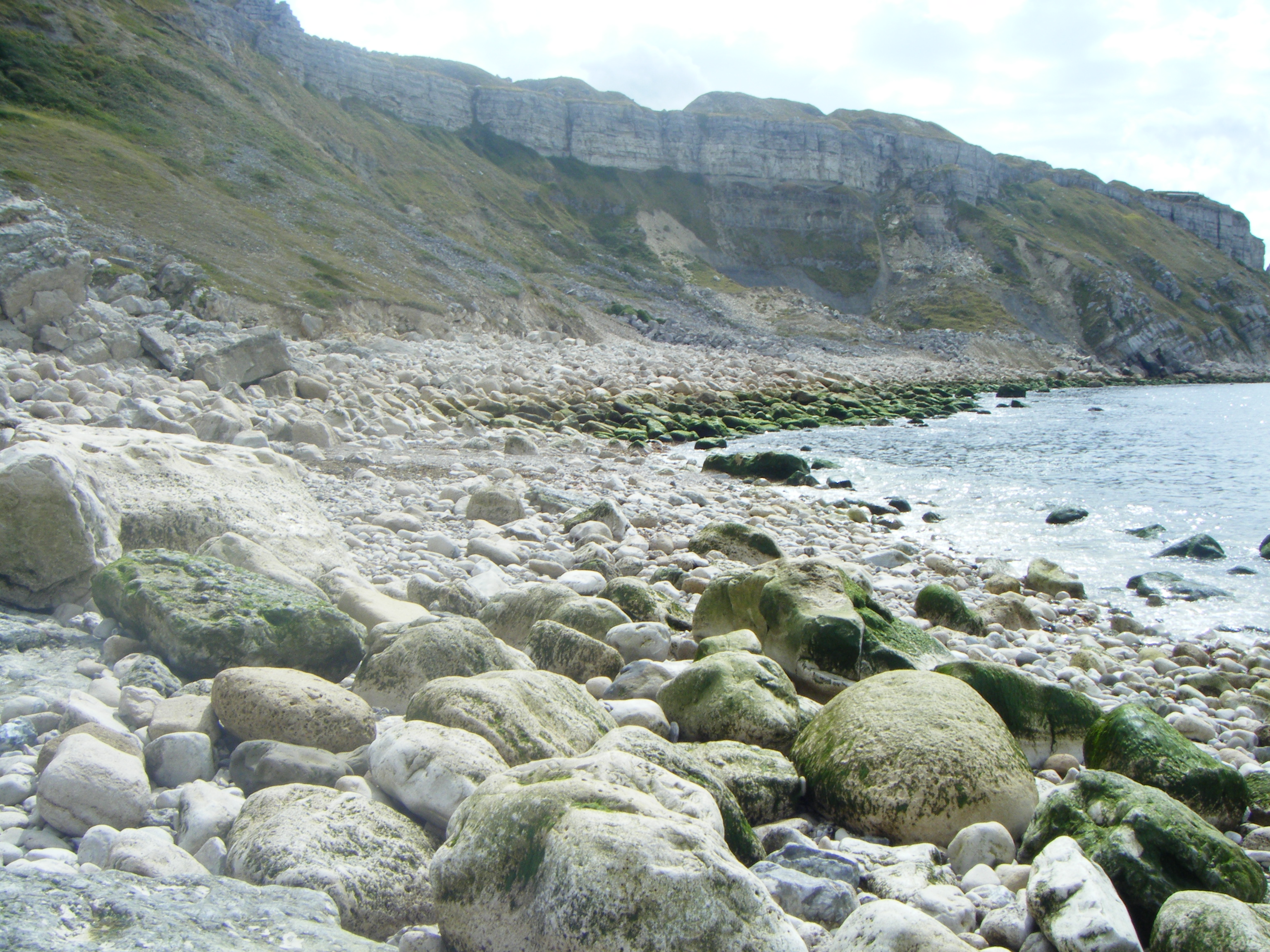
Hallelujah Bay, looking south towards Clay Ope and Blacknor Point.

Hallelujah Bay is a bay located on the west side of the Isle of Portland, Dorset, England. The bay is situated below West Weares, with Clay Ope, Blacknor Point and Mutton Cove further south. Near the cove is a large mound of rock and earth beneath the clifftops known locally as the Green Hump.

The official public path leading to the bay has been subject to landslides over the decades. In 2014, the path was officially closed by the council due to landslides and falling rocks.

== History ==
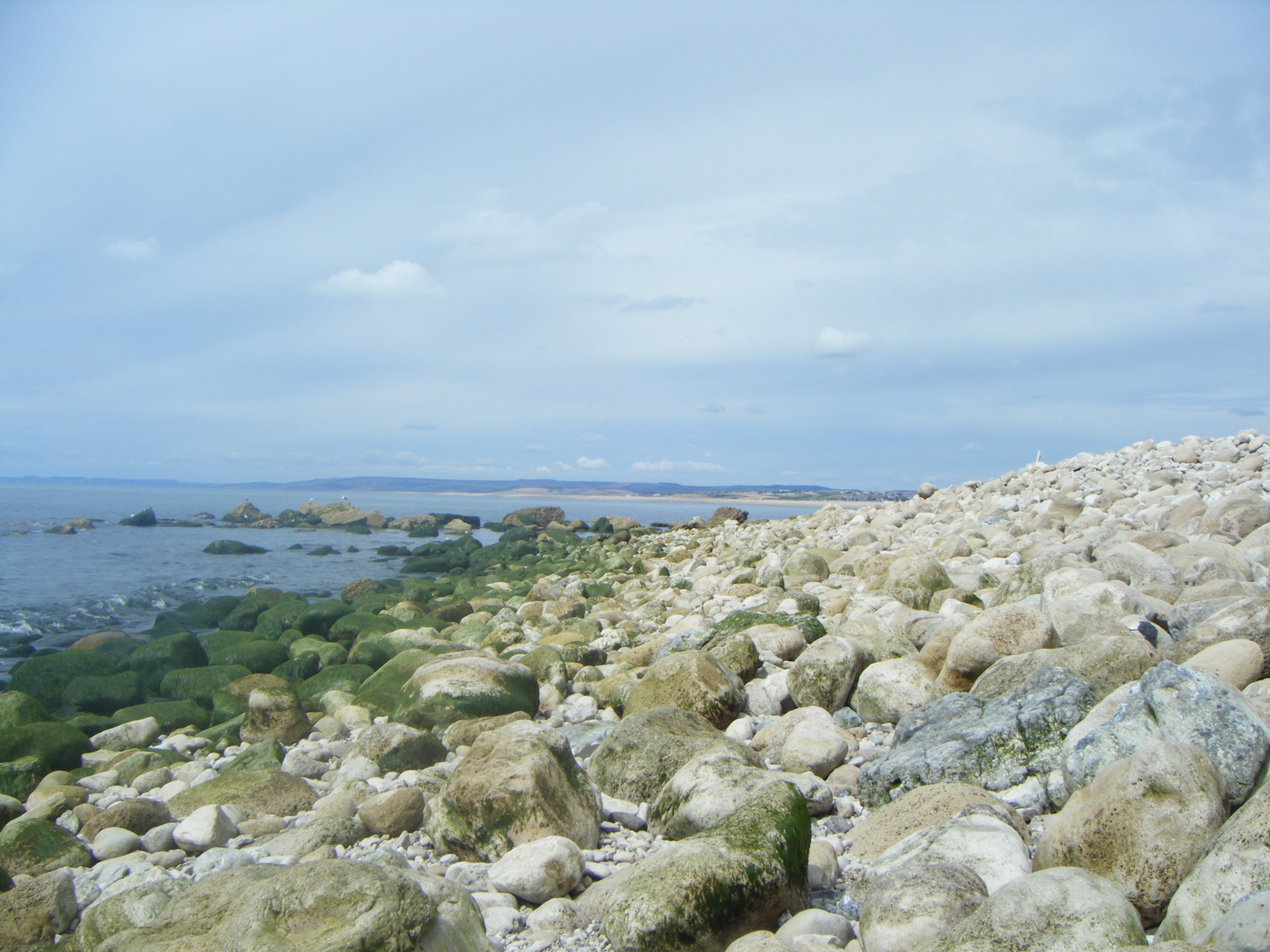
Hallelujah Bay and Tar Rocks.

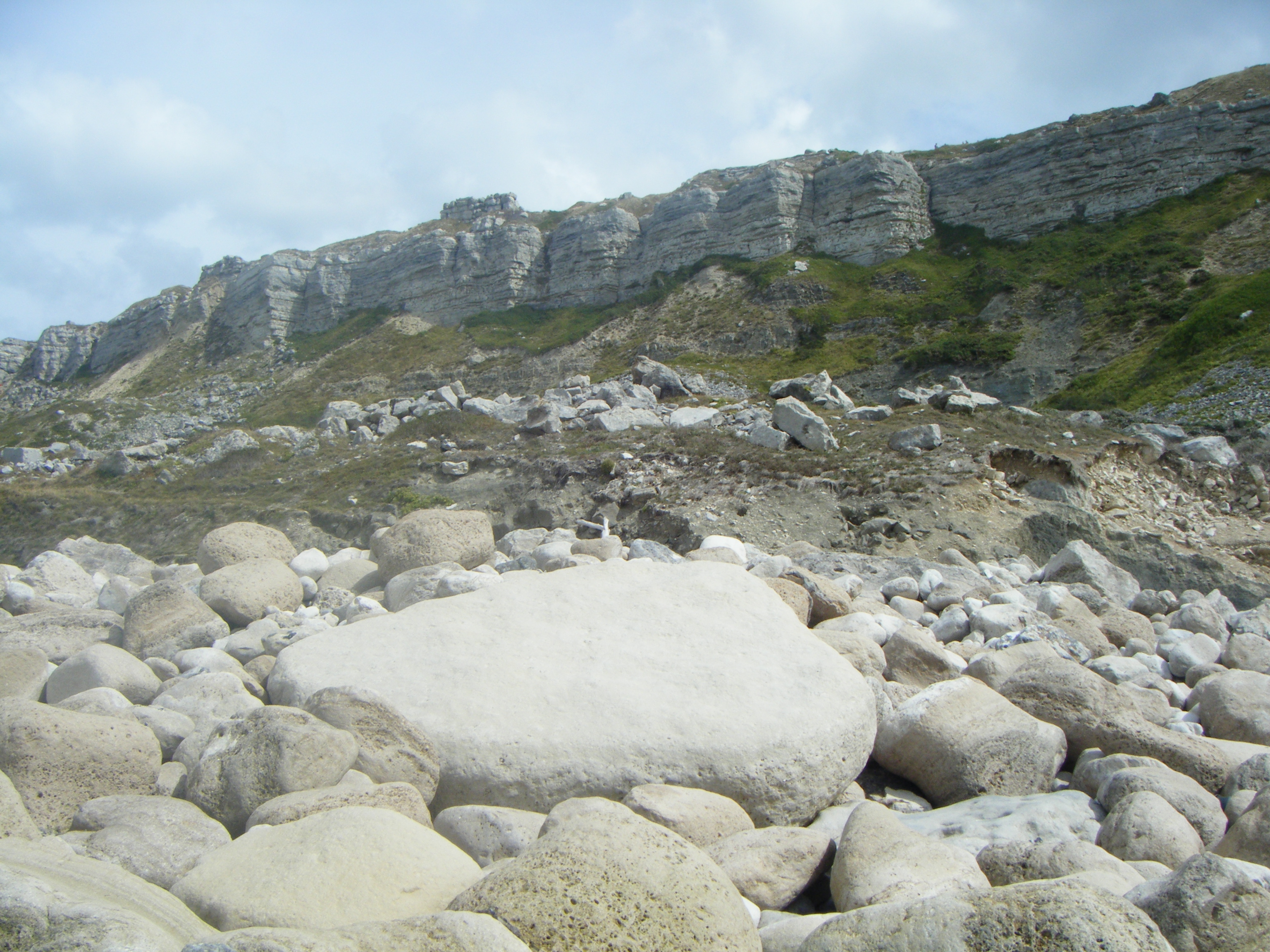
Looking up to the clifftops from the bay.

The quarry-man Hiram Otter began creating a public footpath from Chesil Cove to Hallelujah Bay in the 1880s. He became renowned for etching biblical inscriptions onto the boulders he successfully moved, and then crying "Alleluia!" when each text was completed. He christened the bay as Alleluia Bay (or Hallelujah Bay).

In 2012, the bay was used for an artistic celebration, with stacked towers of stone pebbles being balanced by a hundred locals of all ages. The event was organised by Portland Stone Stax and was held at the bay again in 2013.

== Tar Rocks ==
Tar Rocks are located near the bay. They are the relics of an ancient landslide, with the majority often hidden at high tide. The British cargo steamer SS Thames was wrecked at Tar Rocks in 1891, after being driven ashore in fog. In 1930, SS Barmston, a collier, was also shipwrecked at the site and became a total loss.
