= Otter Cove =

Cove on the south coast of Devon, England

- Cliffs by Otter Cove
- Location: Devon, England
- Coordinates: 50.61127°N 3.35868°W

Location
- Interactive map of Otter Cove

Otter Cove is a small secluded cove on the south coast of Devon, England, between the coastal towns of Exmouth and Budleigh Salterton. It is part of the Jurassic Coast World Heritage Site. Due to a landslip, the cove is no longer accessible from the headland.

The top of the headland, Straight Point, is used as a firing range by the Marines.

== Geology ==
The cliffs at Otter Cove are formed mainly of mudstones belonging to the Aylesbeare Mudstone Group, interbedded with red sandstones. These rocks date from the Triassic period, around 245 million years ago. Their distinctive red coloration reflects deposition in an arid desert environment.

In the corner of Littleham Cove, there is a marked fault, producing a distinct change in the character of the cliffs. South of this fault, at Otter Cove, the succession is dominated by fluvial sandstones that include beds with coarser, dark, subangular grains, approaching the texture of a fine-grained fluvial breccia.

On the eastern side of Straight Point, the cliffs expose sandstones of the Exmouth Formation. Access to this area is restricted to low tide from Littleham Cove, as noted in the official site designation.
