= Michael Fairfax =

English sculptor

Michael Fairfax (born 1953) is an English sculptor. He has created many sculptures by commission, which stand in locations across Britain.

== Life ==
The Geoneedle, at Orcombe Point, Devon

Fairfax was born in Windsor, Berkshire, son of the poet John Fairfax. He studied at Portsmouth College of Art from 1976 to 1977, and then at Gwent College of Higher Education, graduating with honours in 1980. He has taught in Britain and abroad. He has been artist-in-residence at Margam Sculpture Park, the Forestry Commission at Garw Valley, and elsewhere, and has fulfilled many commissions for public art. He is a member of the Royal Society of Sculptors.

== Works ==
His works include the following:

"Theatre Sculpture", on Canal Road in Brecon, Powys, near Theatr Brycheiniog, was commissioned by Powys County Council and British Waterways, and was unveiled in 1997. It is made of bronze and stainless steel: a column, height 3.66 metres (12.0 ft), stands on a base with five concentric circles of stones.

The Geoneedle, at Orcombe Point in Devon, was commissioned by Devon County Council and was unveiled by the Prince of Wales, now Charles III, on 3 October 2002. The occasion marked the opening of the Jurassic Coast, of which Orcombe Point is the westernmost point, as a World Heritage Site. The Geoneedle is 5 metres (16 ft) high and is made of Portland stone; inset rocks show the changes of rock formation along the coast. There is a hopscotch leading up the needle, made of the various rock types along the coast.

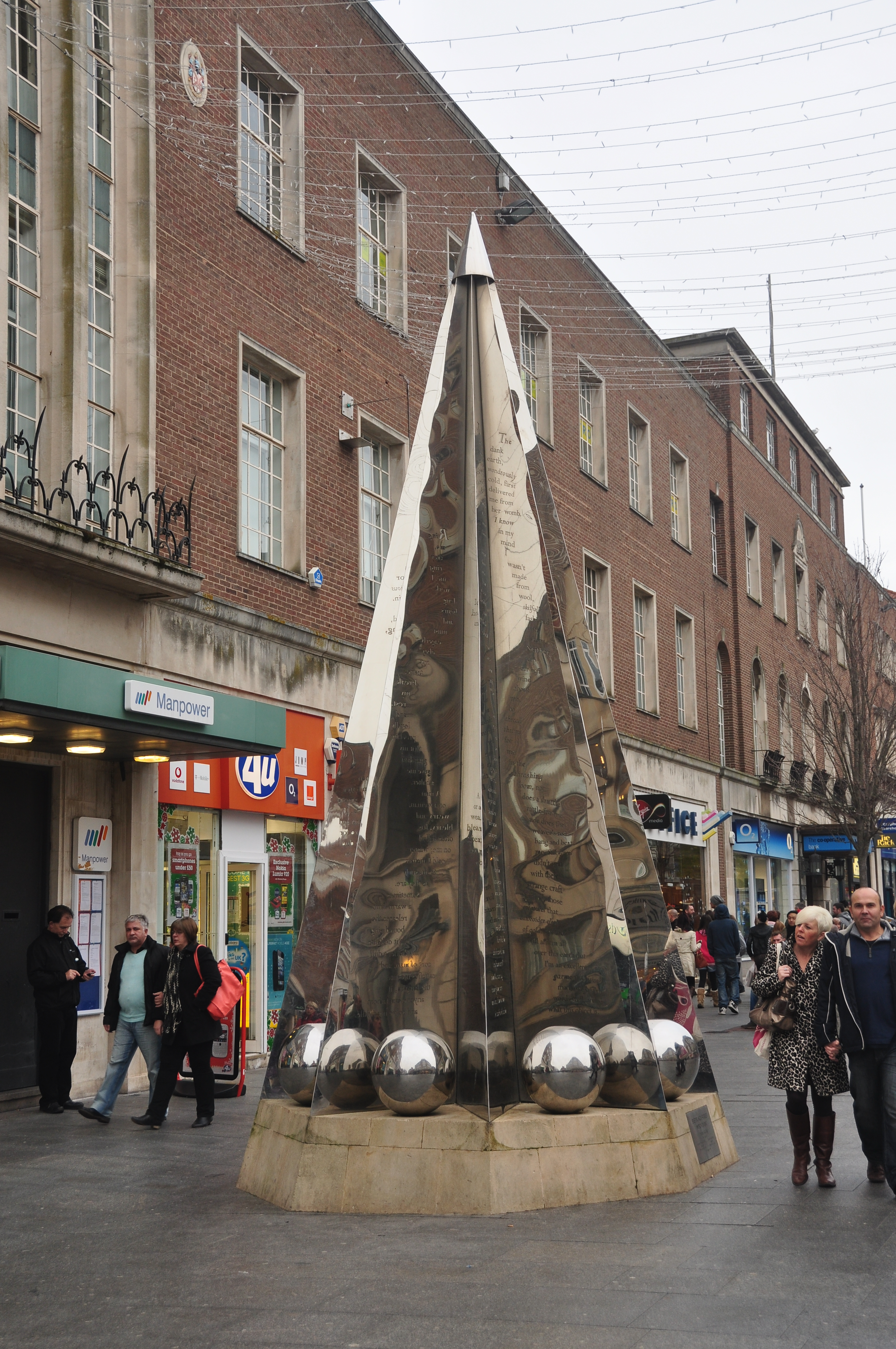
"Exeter Riddle"

"Exeter Riddle", in High Street, Exeter, was commissioned by Exeter City Council and was unveiled on 30 March 2005. It is made of stainless steel and is 6.5 metres (21 ft) high. Riddles from the 10th-century Exeter Book, translated from Old English by Kevin Crossley-Holland, are cut into the eight panels in mirror-writing, each readable from the panel opposite. The spheres at the base of the sculpture bear the answers to the riddles, reflected onto the panels.

"Buttercross Needle", on Marriotts Walk in Witney, Oxfordshire, was commissioned by West Oxfordshire District Council for a new leisure and retail development, and was unveiled on 12 October 2009. It is made of stainless steel and glass; internally there are fibre optic lights that illuminate thin glass strips at night. Councillor Warwick Robinson said: "Although the 'Buttercross Needle' is very modern, its design references well-known local landmarks such as the spire of St Mary's Church in Church Green and the roof of the Buttercross".
