= Egmont Bight =

Bay in Dorset, England

Coordinates: 50°35′42″N 2°4′38″W

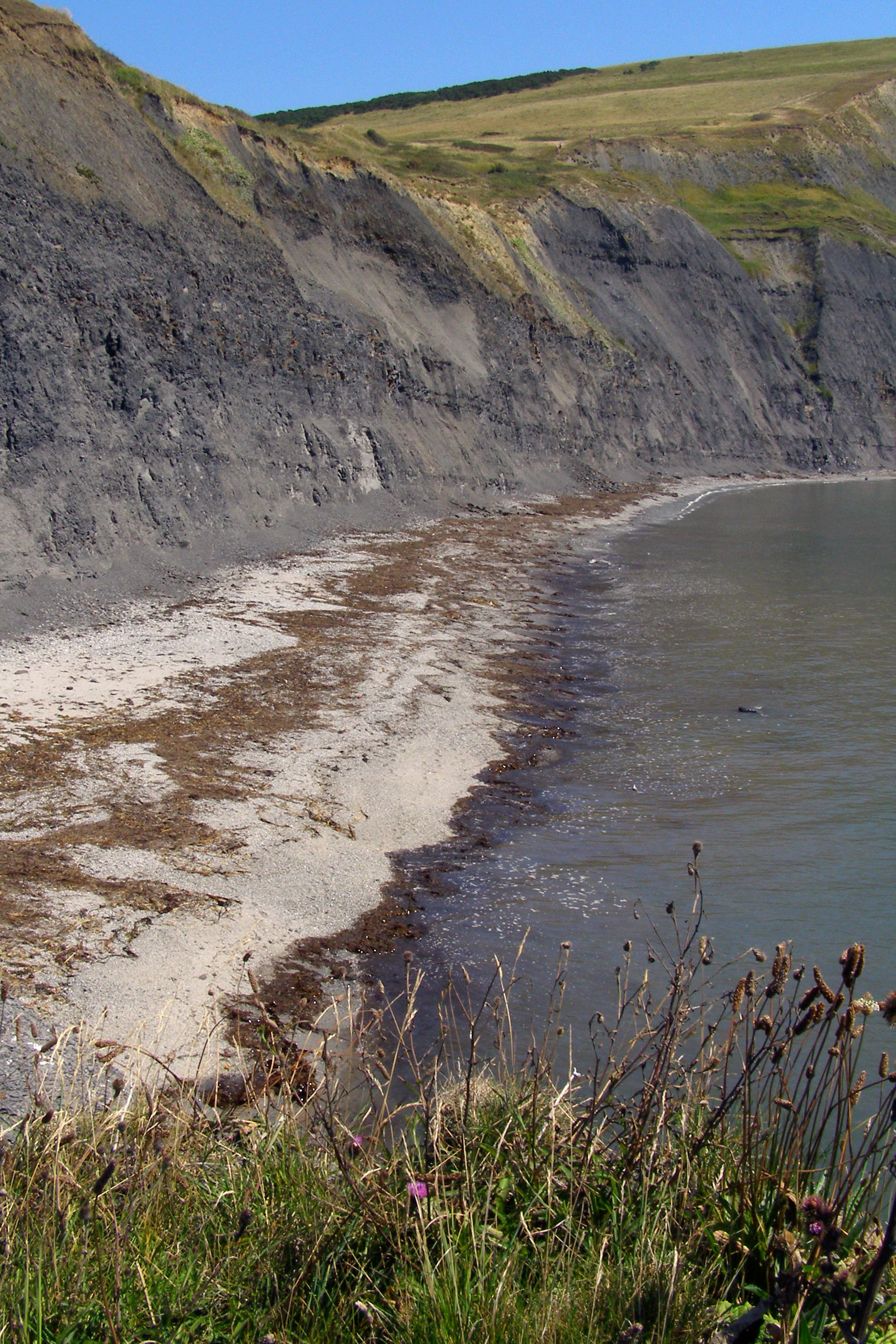
Looking down on the beach at Egmont Bight

Egmont Bight is a shallow embayment at the southern end of the Encombe valley in Dorset, England. It is part of the Jurassic Coast.

== Geology ==
The bay exposes good sections of Upper Kimmeridge shale and mudstone, with some bituminous shale and some small calcareous nodules.

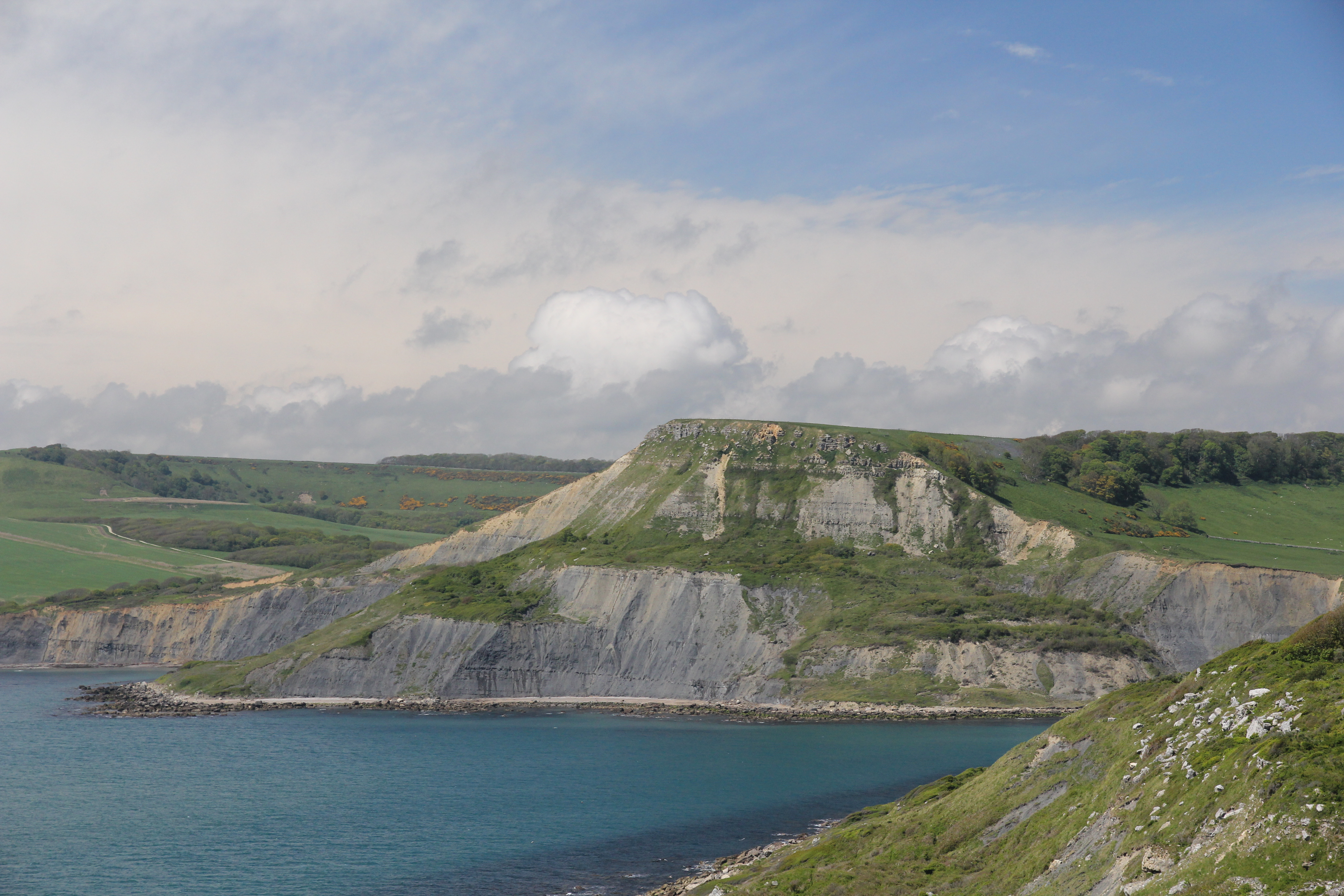
Egmont Point, seen from St Aldhelm's Head

On foot the stony beach is only accessible at low tide by walking 1.0-kilometre (0.6 mi) west around Egmont Point from the beach at Chapman's Pool. There is no safe route down from the clifftop coast path, across Houns-tout cliff, nor around the Freshwater Steps promontory at the beach's western end.

== See also ==
- List of Dorset beaches

== Gallery ==
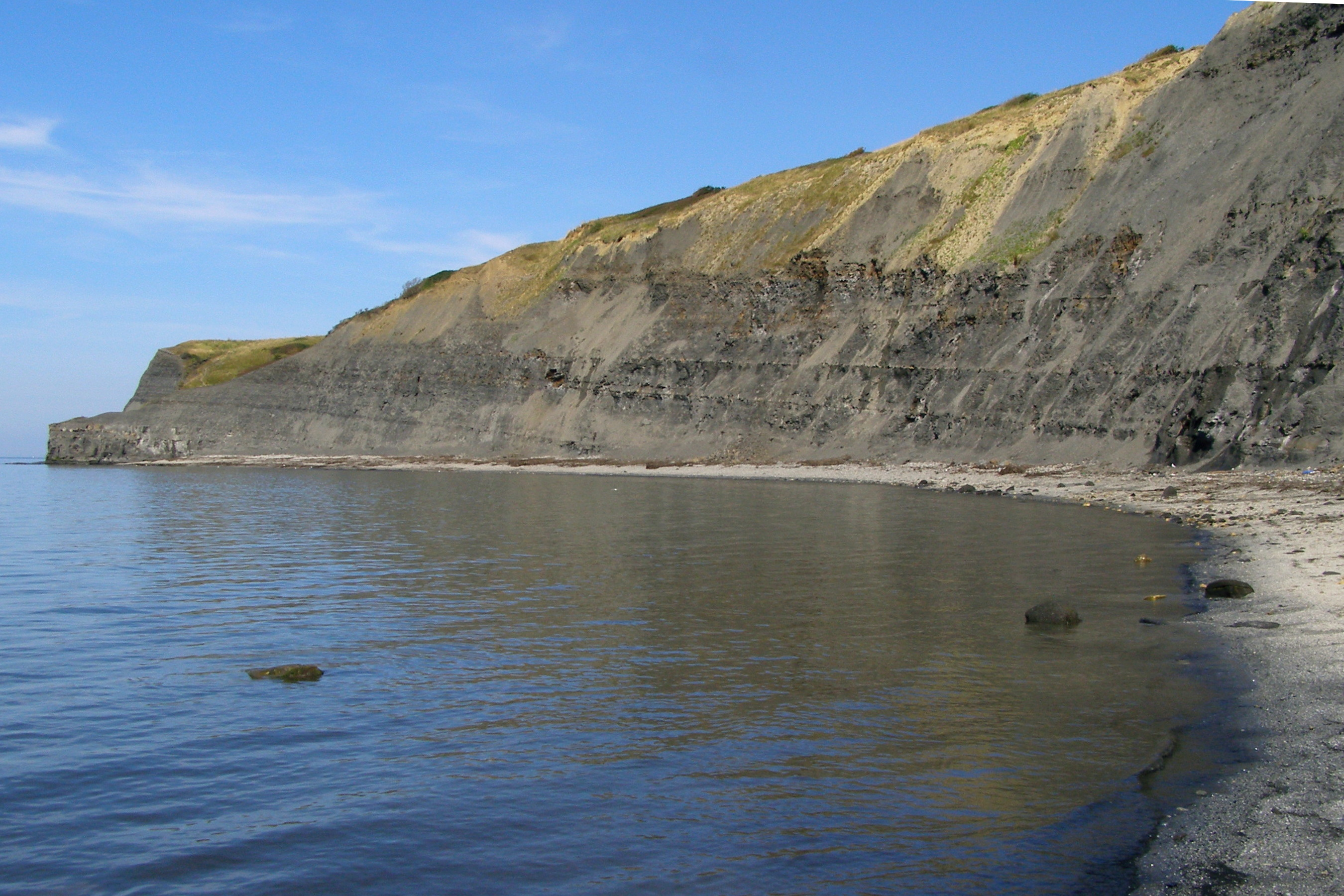
Egmont Bight

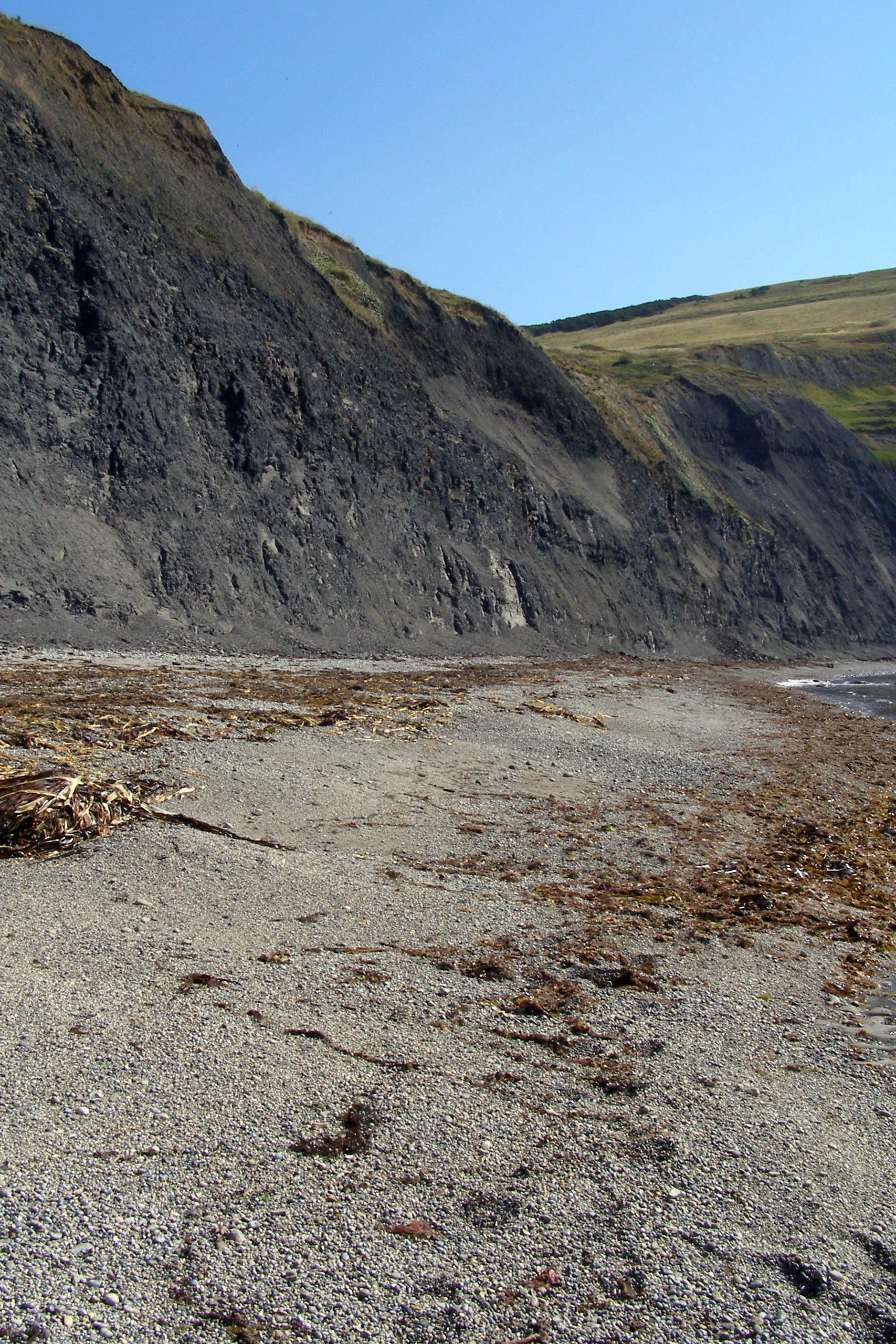
Stony beach, Egmont Bight

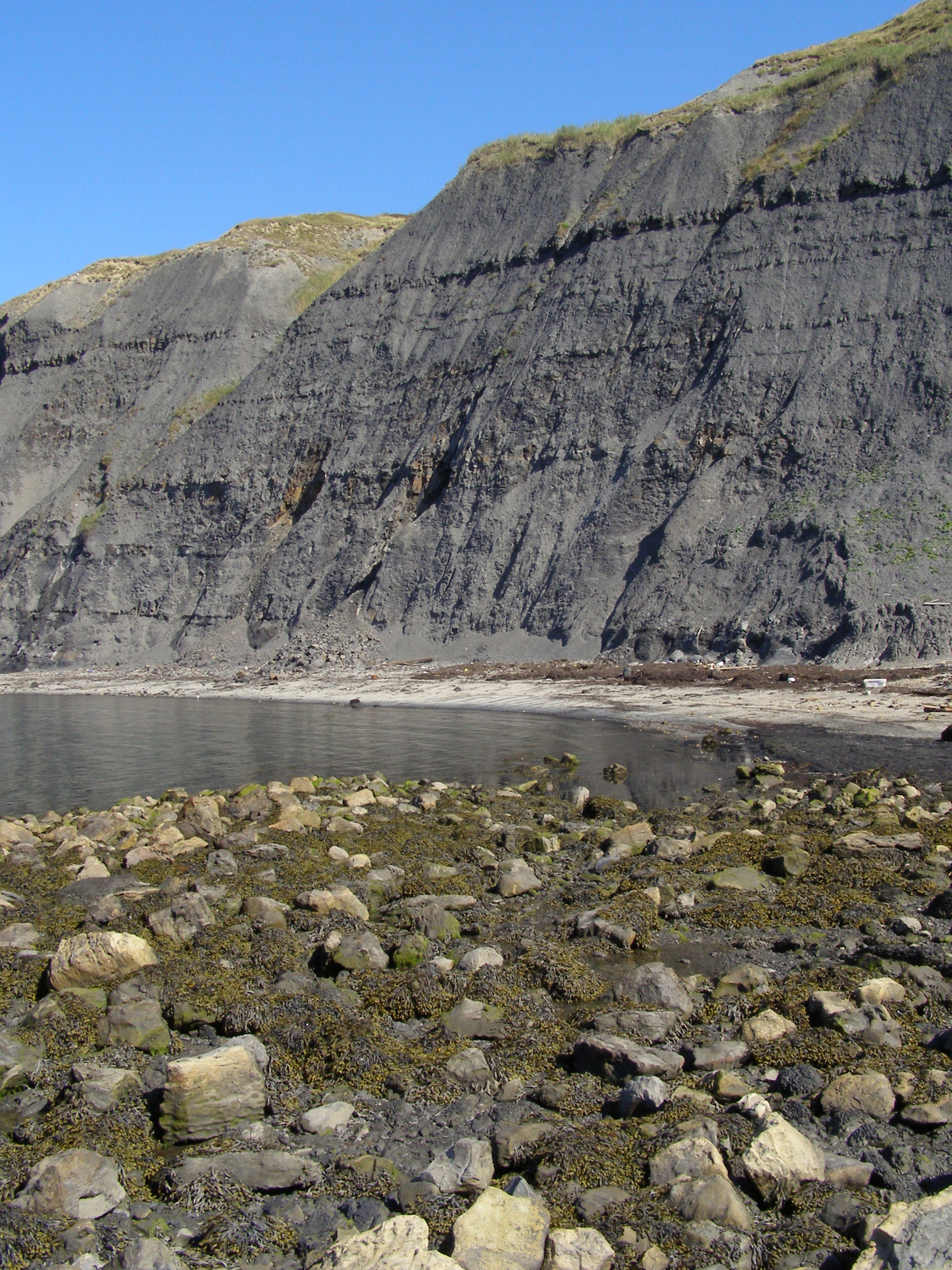
East end of the beach

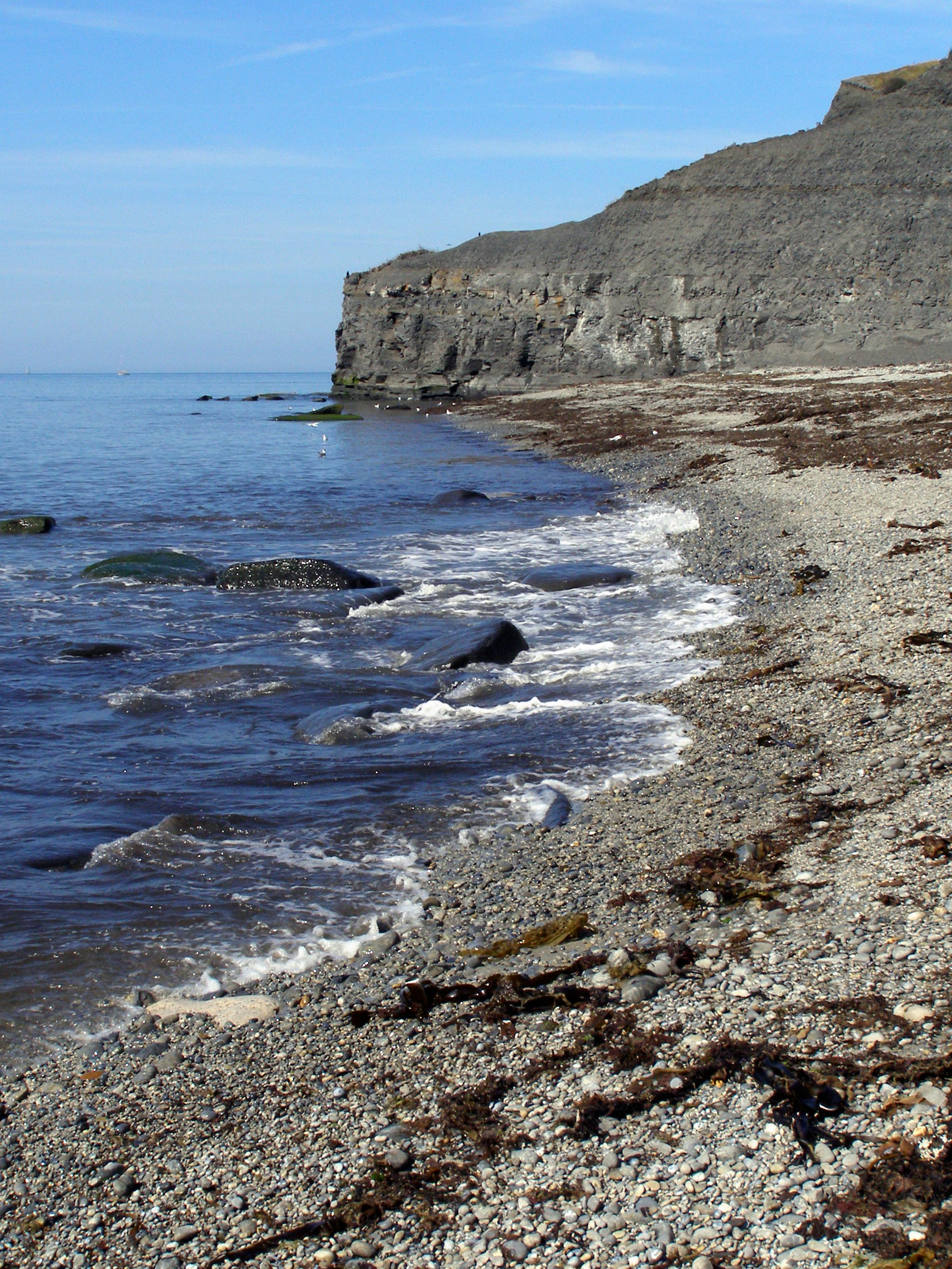
West end of the beach

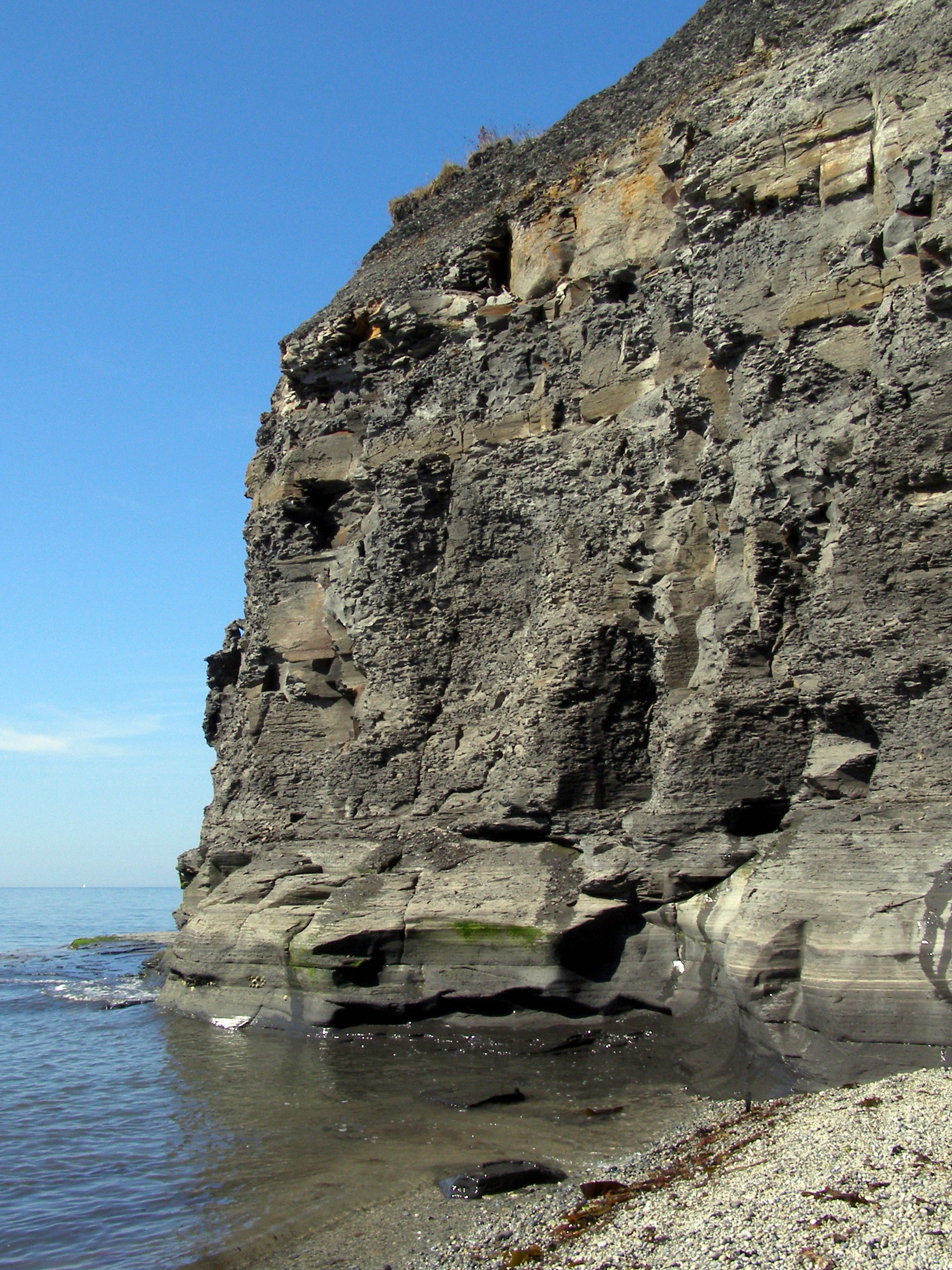
East side of the small Freshwater Steps promontory

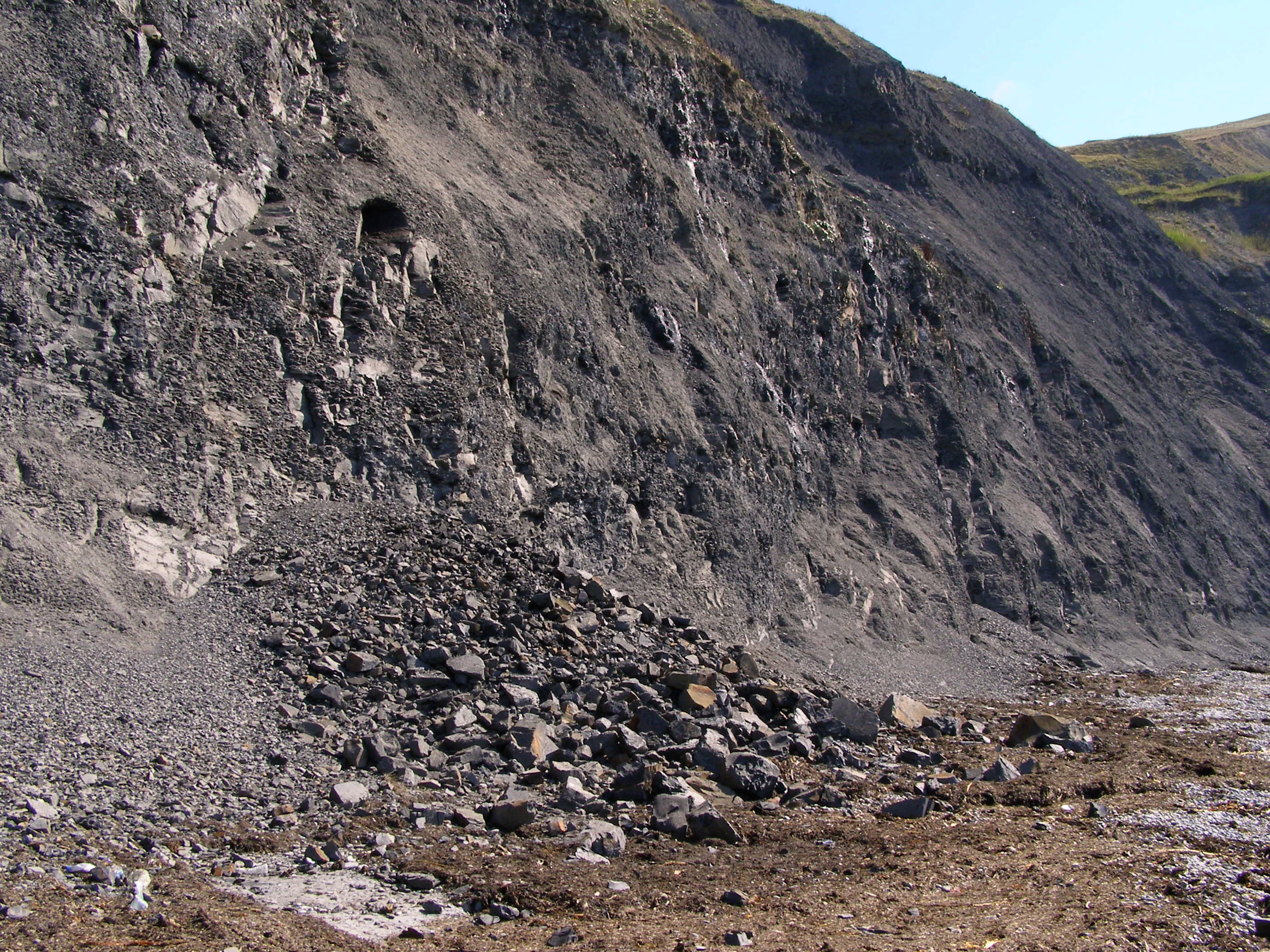
Cliff-fall of shale on the beach
