= Parson's Barn =

Cavern in Dorset, UK

Coordinates: 50°38′27″N 1°55′31″W

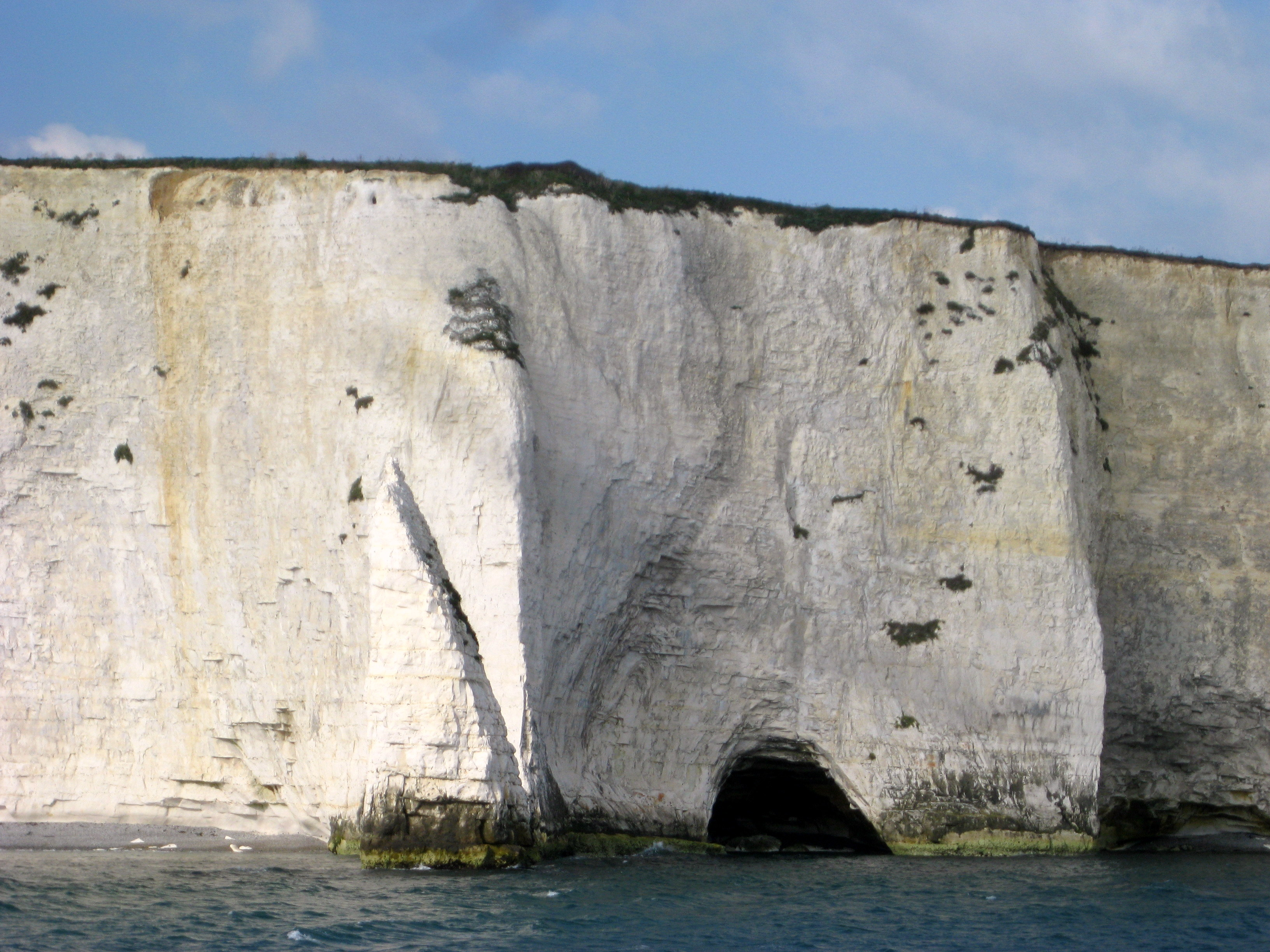
The cave Parson's Barn and to its left a Pinnacle

Parson's Barn is a large sea-level cavern below the Ballard Point cliffs, between Studland and Swanage bays in the English Channel. Ballard Point is the headland of the Ballard Downs, an area of chalk downland, on the Isle of Purbeck in Dorset, southern England.

Parson's Barn lies directly east of Studland, about 5 kilometres (3.1 mi) northeast of Swanage, and a few hundred metres south of Handfast Point and the Old Harry Rocks. Parson's Barn is the largest of several arches and caverns in this location and is 12 metres high at its mouth.

The cavern was once used as a smugglers' cave. A large section has collapsed since then and has been eroded away by the sea. Now only a few chalk stacks, called the Pinnacles, remain.

== Folklore ==
As the winds blow through the arches during severe gales it results in sounds similar to a ghostly pealing of bells. Legend has it that the eerie sound comes from a ship that had transporting bells to a church in Poole and that sank because of the crew's blasphemy. Legend also has it that Parson's Barn became its name because the local parson was brought here once a month to hold his sermon and to bless the local fishermen and their work.
