= Winspit =

Quarry on the Isle of Purbeck, Dorset, England

Coordinates: 50.5848°N 2.0342°W

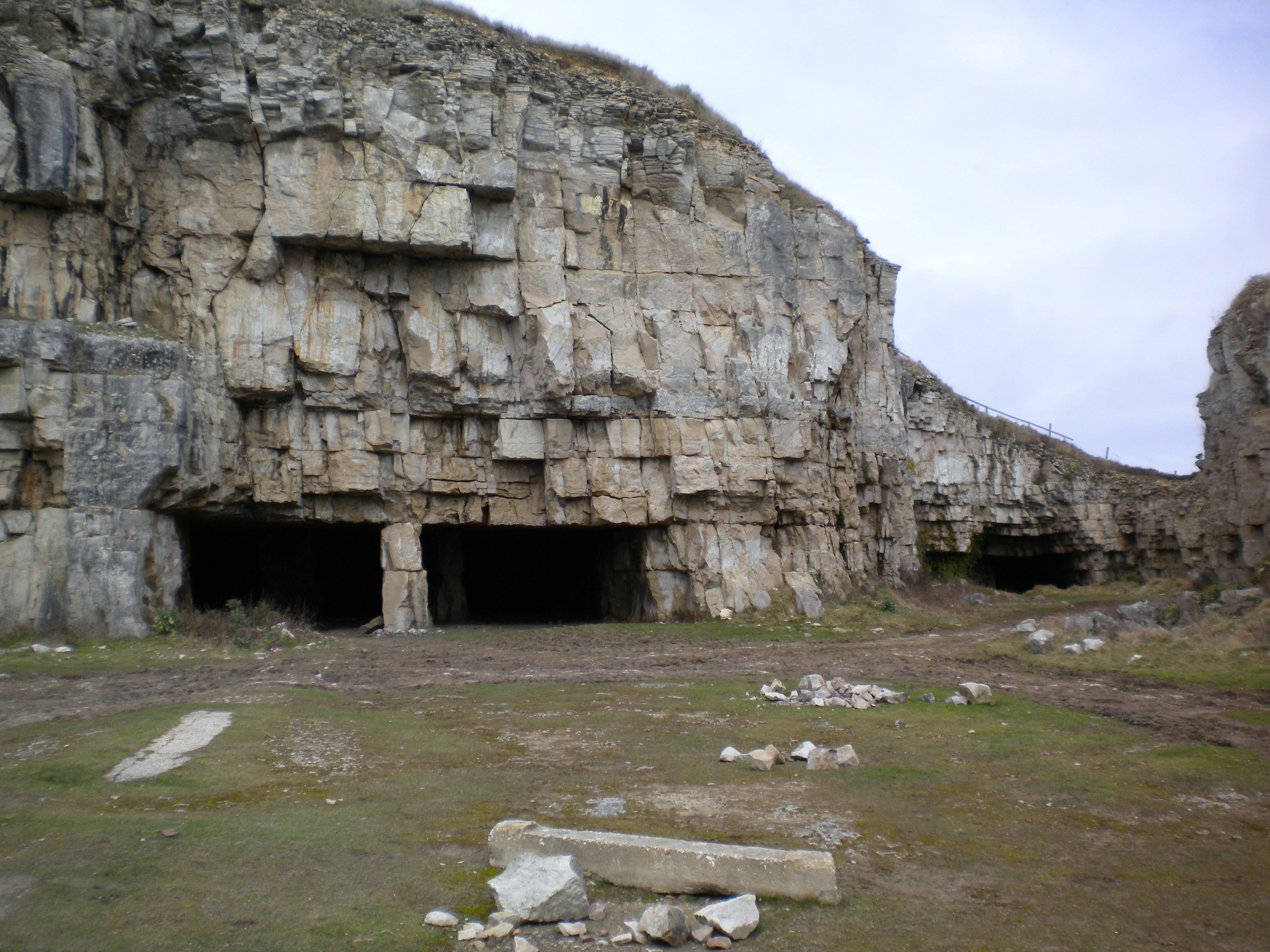
Winspit quarry

Winspit is a disused quarry on the cliffs near Worth Matravers in the Isle of Purbeck, Dorset, England. To the west and east are the hills of West Man and East Man.

Until around 1940, Winspit was used as a stone quarry, providing stone for buildings in London. During World War II, it was used as a site for naval and air defences. After the war, the caves were opened to the public.

The quarry is now a lesser-known tourist attraction. Recently many of Winspit's caves have been closed off for public safety and bat conservation.

In March 2022, the National Trust purchased the 350 acres (140 ha) Weston Farm, including Winspit and its bat caves, adding to its other landholdings in the village and its vicinity such as Spyway.

== Filming location ==
Winspit Quarry and caves were used as a location for the planet Mecron II in the Blake's 7 episode "Games", and in Doctor Who they were used in the story "The Underwater Menace", and then as the planet Skaro in the serial "Destiny of the Daleks", the quarry's stone cottage and two other larger buildings, (which were just empty derelict shells, with their roofs missing), were used in "Destiny", they were transformed into the external ruins of the long abandoned Dalek city and disused Kaled Bunkers.

Later for the 2012 Disney film John Carter it was used as the scene location for the "Orkney Dig".

The quarry was used for the British drama film Jubilee (1978).

In May 2021, the quarry was also used for a location shoot for the Star Wars television series Andor.

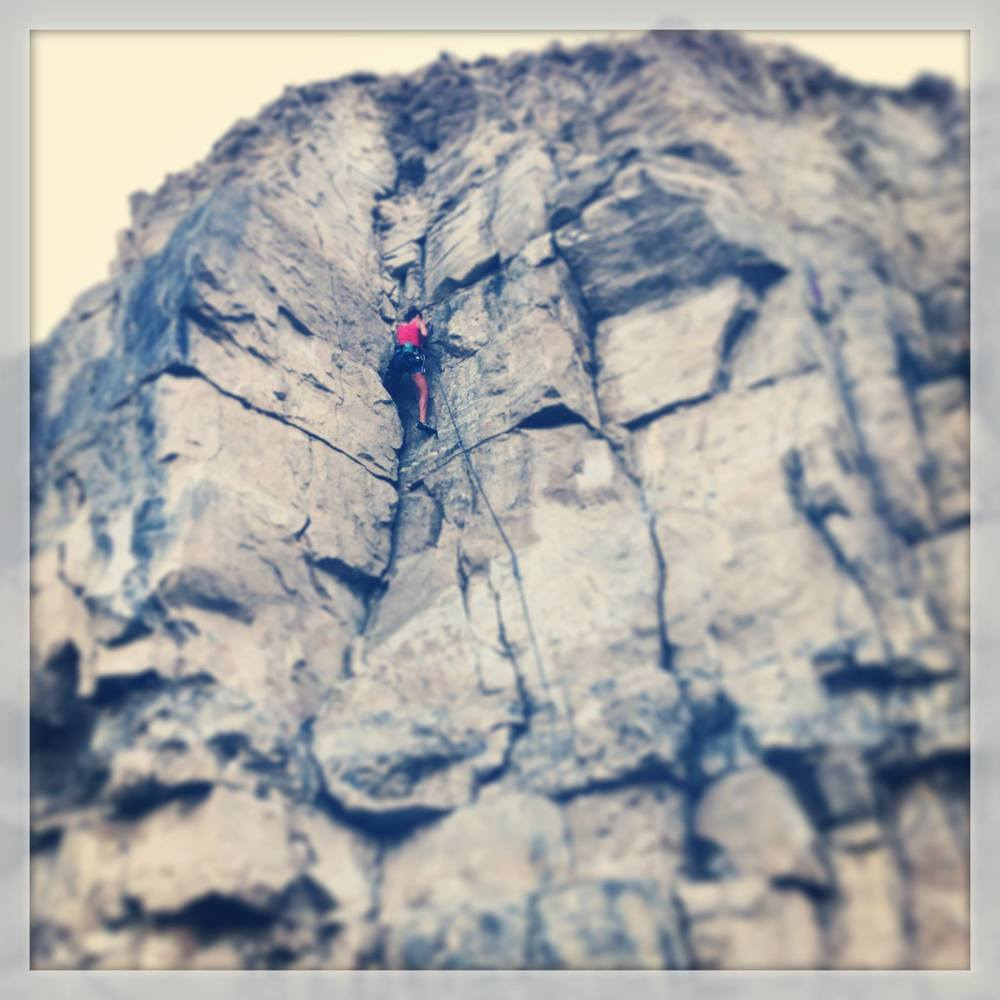
climber, Winspit, Dorset, England

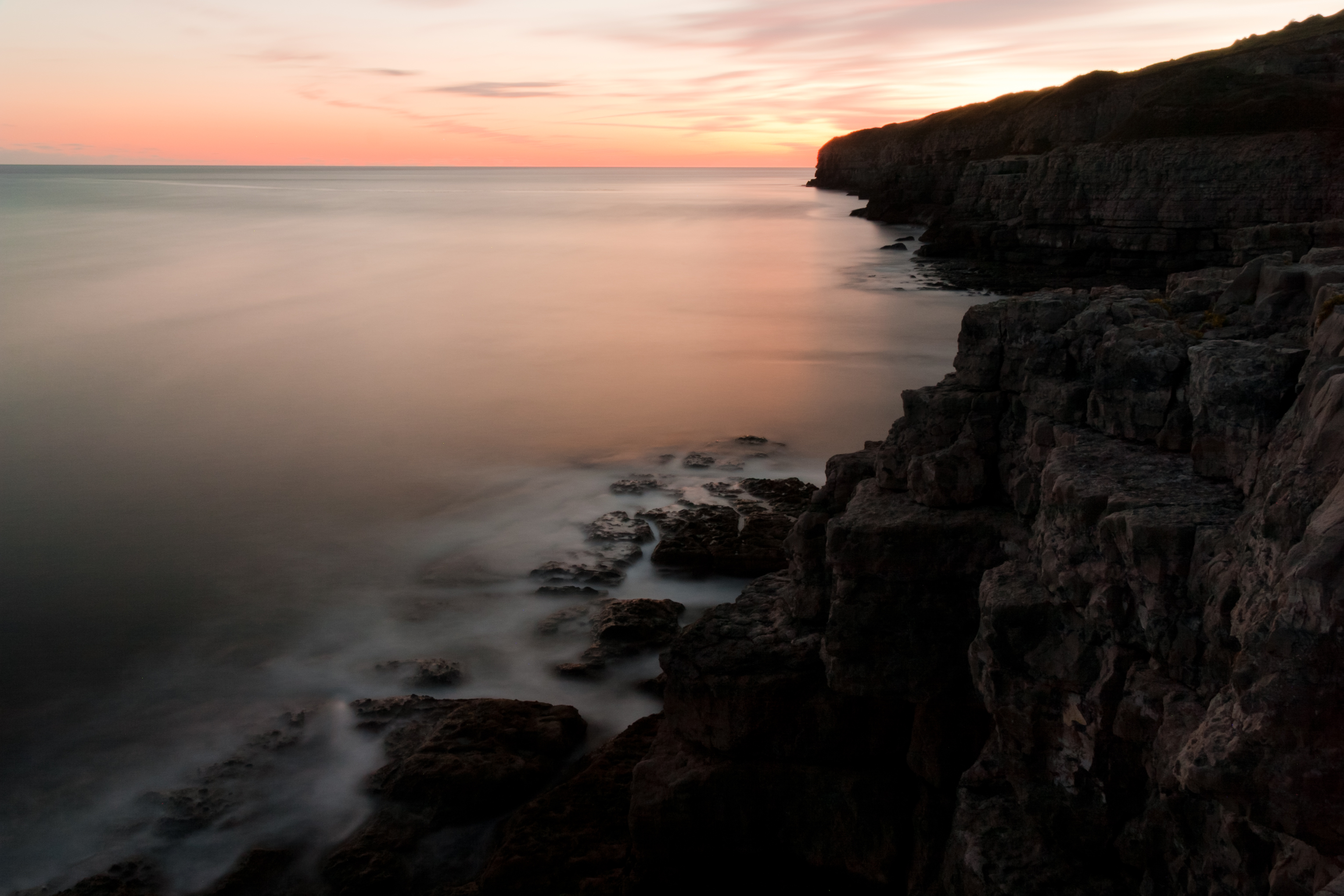
Winspit Cove

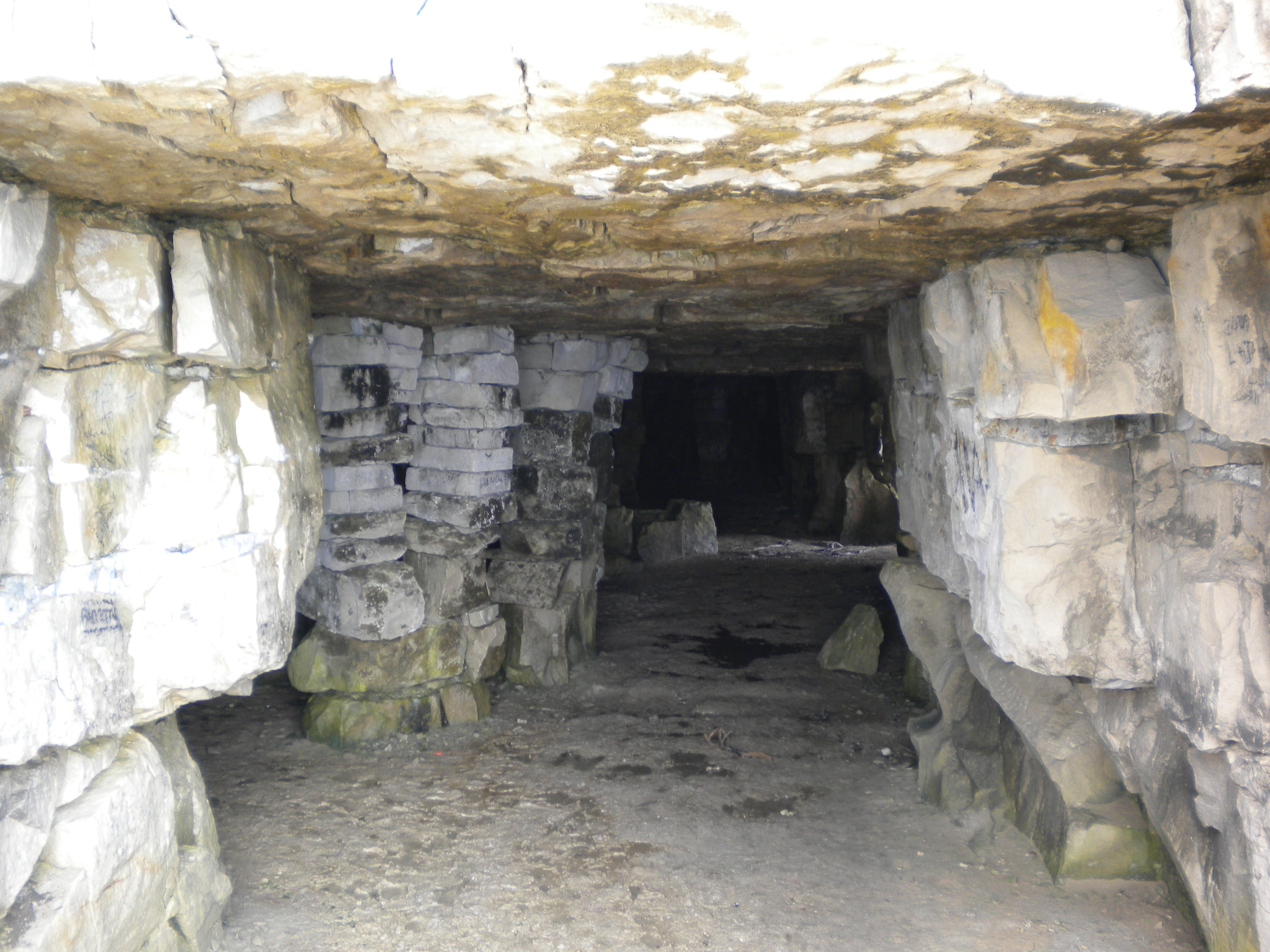
Inside a gallery
