= Orcombe Point =

Headland on the south coast of Devon, England

Coordinates: 50°36′26.38″N 3°23′06.80″W

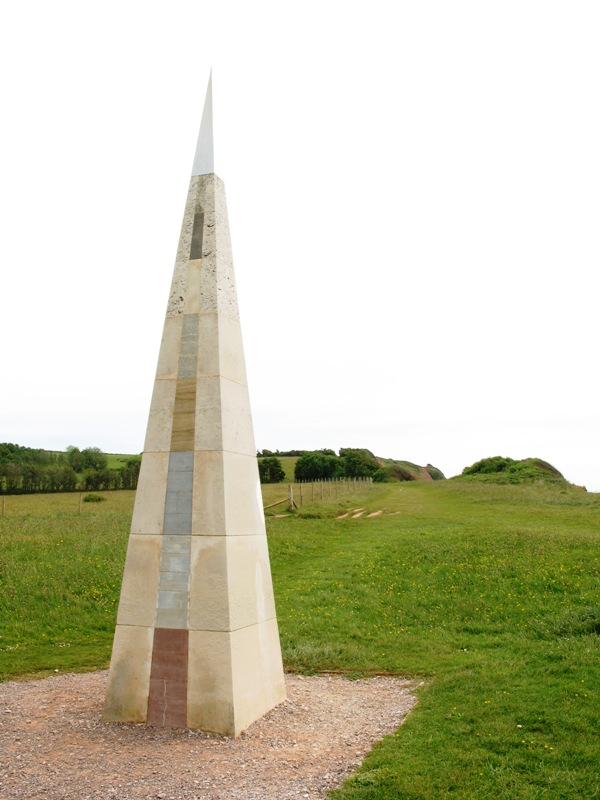
The "geoneedle" is made from different rocks along the Jurassic Coast and marks its western end at Orcombe Point near Exmouth, Devon.

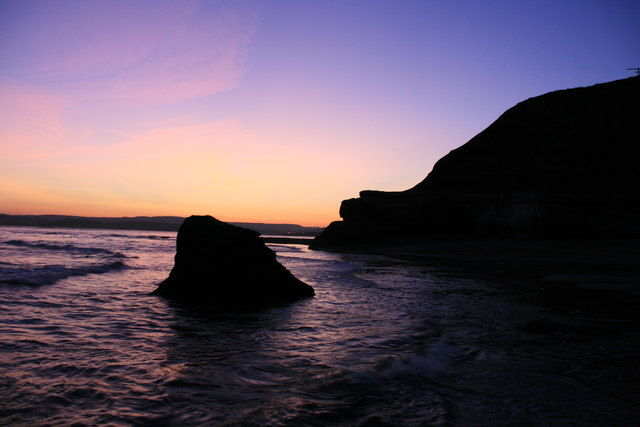
Orcombe Point - The furthest Western extremity of Sandy Bay.

Orcombe Point is a coastal feature near Exmouth, Devon, on the south coast of England. It lies about 10 mi (16 km) south of the city of Exeter, 2 mi (3.2 km) southeast of Exmouth town centre and about 7.5 mi (12.1 km) southwest of Sidmouth.

Directly to the west lies Exmouth Beach and to the east is Sandy Bay, a holiday beach, that can be reached either along the coastal path or through the large caravan park. The two beaches are part of a long strip of sand and are connected to each other below Orcombe Point at low tide.

Sited high upon the hill, Orcombe Point is marked by the "Geoneedle", which was unveiled by Prince Charles, in 2002, at the inauguration. The artist whose conceived and designed the "Geoneedle" sculpture was Michael Fairfax. He also conceived and designed the "Exeter Riddle" in Exeter. The Geoneedle is constructed from a variety of different stones, representing both the major building stones to be found on the Jurassic Coast and the sequence of rocks that form this part of the coastline.

== Geology ==
The rocks dip gently to the east. Due to this tilting and erosion the oldest exposed rocks are found here in the west, with progressively younger rocks forming the cliffs further east. The coastal exposures along the coastline provide a continuous sequence of Triassic, Jurassic and Cretaceous rock formations spanning approximately 185 million years of the Earth's history. The localities along the Jurassic Coast includes a large range of important fossil zones.

Orcombe Point is the western end of the Jurassic Coast and the South West Coast Path includes the entire length of the site.

The ascent to Orcombe Point shows the successive layers of different sedimentary rocks, which were deposited under varying geological conditions. At the base are cross-bedded sandstones. Towards the top, the rock types are those deposited by quieter, slower-flowing waters (i.e. siltstones and mudstones). The sediments are markedly red and this indicates that they were formed in a desert. These formations belong to the Aylesbeare Mudstone Group and date from the Triassic period 250 million years ago.
