= Weston Mouth =

Beach in Devon, England

Coordinates: 50.6851°N 3.1836°W

Weston Mouth (Beach) on 8 August 2008.

Weston Mouth is an isolated beach on the East Devon coast between Sidmouth and Seaton in England. It can be reached only by footpath, either along the South West Coast Path or from the village of Weston. The beach is mostly shingle with some sand at low tide, and has no facilities.

Parts of the beach have a long tradition of use as a nudist beach. This is well known locally and has continued without significant problem for many years. It is 1 of 19 nude beaches in the United Kingdom, and one of three in Devon.

== See also ==
- List of social nudity places in Europe
