= Sandy Bay, Devon =

Bay and sandy beach on the south coast of Devon, England

Coordinates: 50.60993°N 3.36472°W

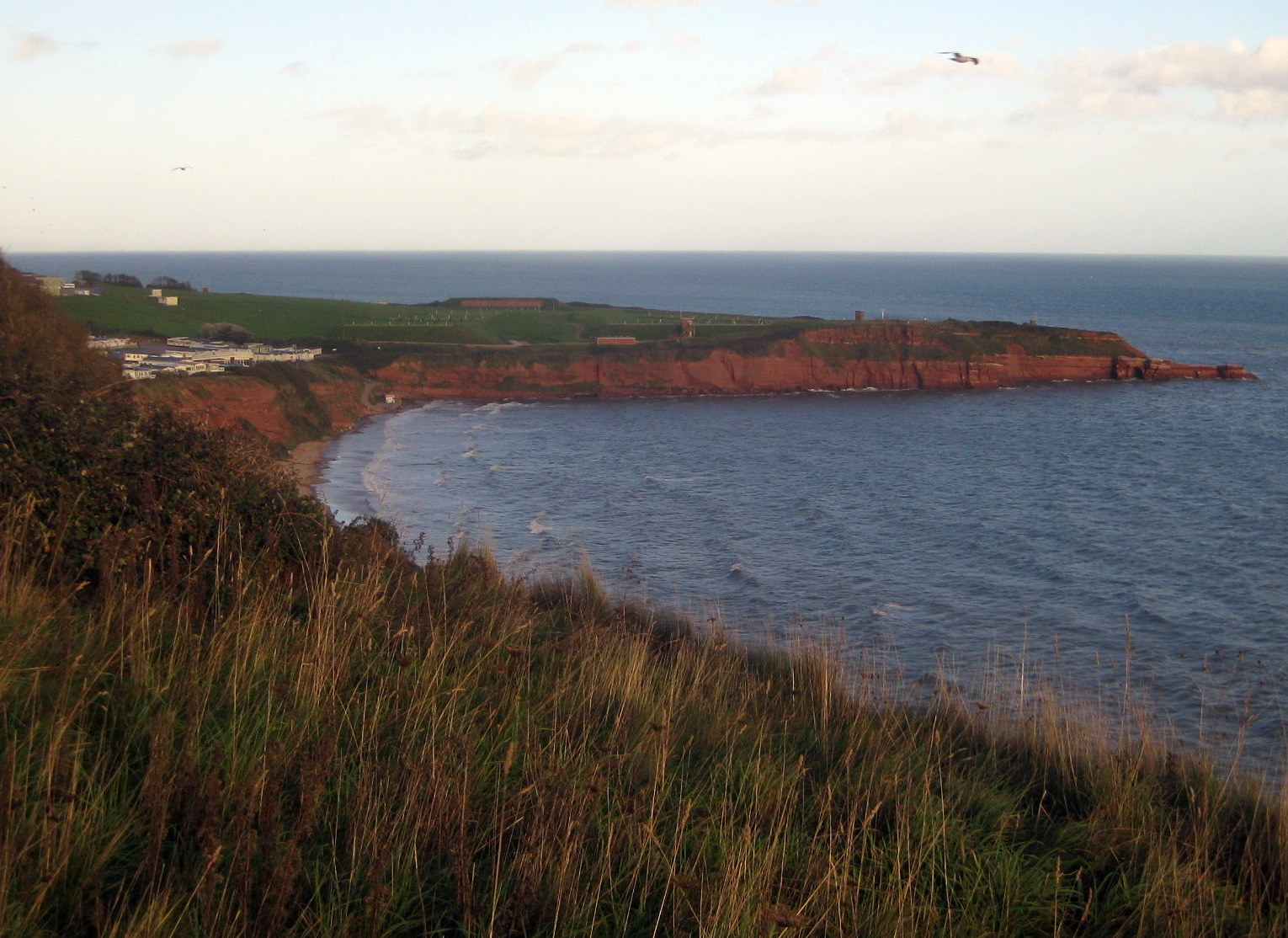
View across Sandy Bay, looking towards Straight Point

Sandy Bay is a secluded bay with a sand beach, about 1.6 kilometres (0.99 mi) long, in Exmouth, Devon, England. It is a sandy beach with rock pools at one end, backed by high cliffs. It is part of a long strip of sand which is connected to the beach at Exmouth at low tide. Nearby are the Orcombe rocks, which is a famous spot for fossils.

Sandy Bay is about 16 kilometres (9.9 mi) south of the city of Exeter, 4 kilometres (2.5 mi) southeast of Exmouth and about 11 kilometres (6.8 mi) southwest of Sidmouth.

The large seaside caravan resort at Sandy Bay is owned by Haven Holidays, and is called Devon Cliffs. West of Sandy Bay are the Orcombe rocks, well known for its fossils. To the east is Straight Point, this headland is used by the Royal Marines as a firing range. Further to the east is Otter Cove, Littleton Cove and the town of Budleigh Salterton.
