= Littleham Cove =

Cove on the south coast of Devon, England

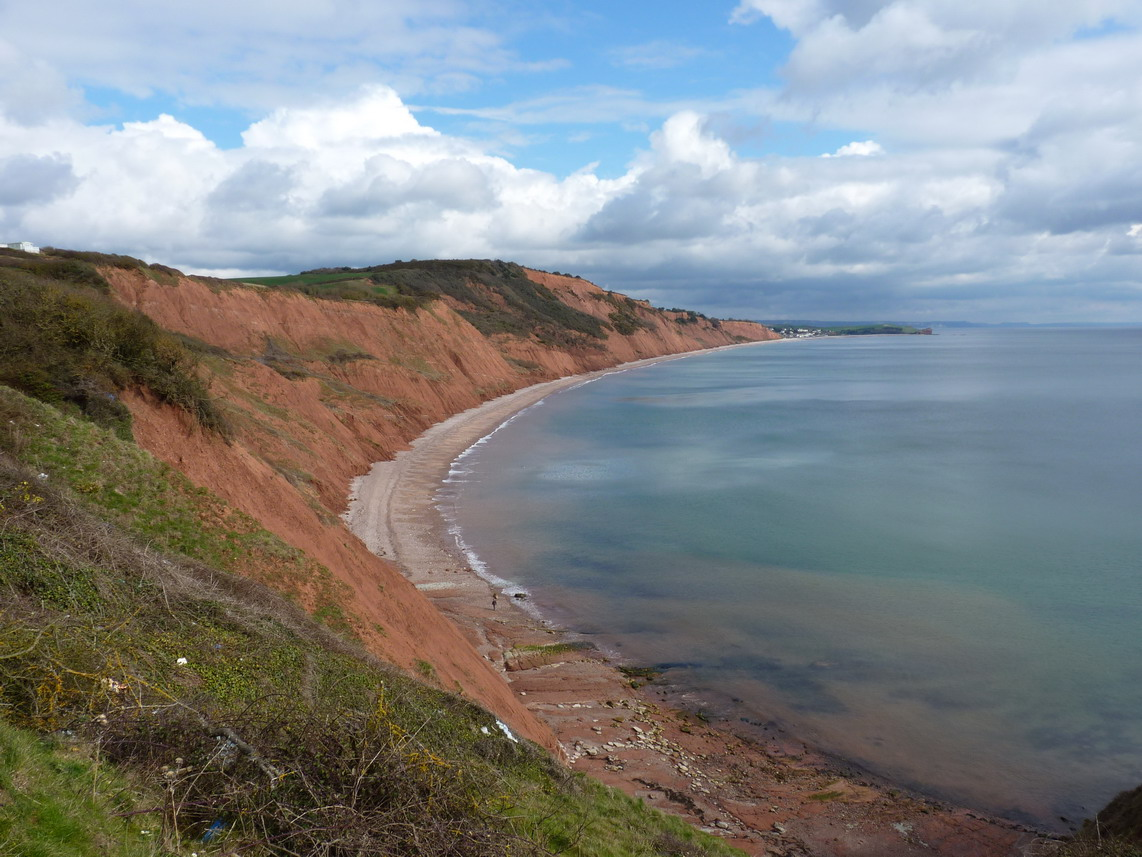
- Cliffs by Littleham Cove
- Location: Devon, England
- Coordinates: 50.61912°N 3.35227°W

Location
- Interactive map of Littleham Cove

Littleham Cove is a cove on the south coast of Devon, England. Located between Exmouth and Budleigh Salterton, it is part of the Jurassic Coast World Heritage Site.

== Geography ==
The cove is characterized by its dramatic red sandstone cliffs and pebble beaches. It lies approximately 3.2 kilometres (2.0 mi) west of Budleigh Salterton.

The area is part of the East Devon National Landscape. The cliffs provide nesting habitats for various seabirds. The cove, along with Otterton Point, largely control the wave-energy distribution of the Budleigh Salterton Beach.

=== Geology ===
Littleham Cove is a site of geological importance. The cliffs provide a clear record of environmental changes occurring roughly 250 million years ago.
