= Chapman's Pool =

Cove in Dorset, England

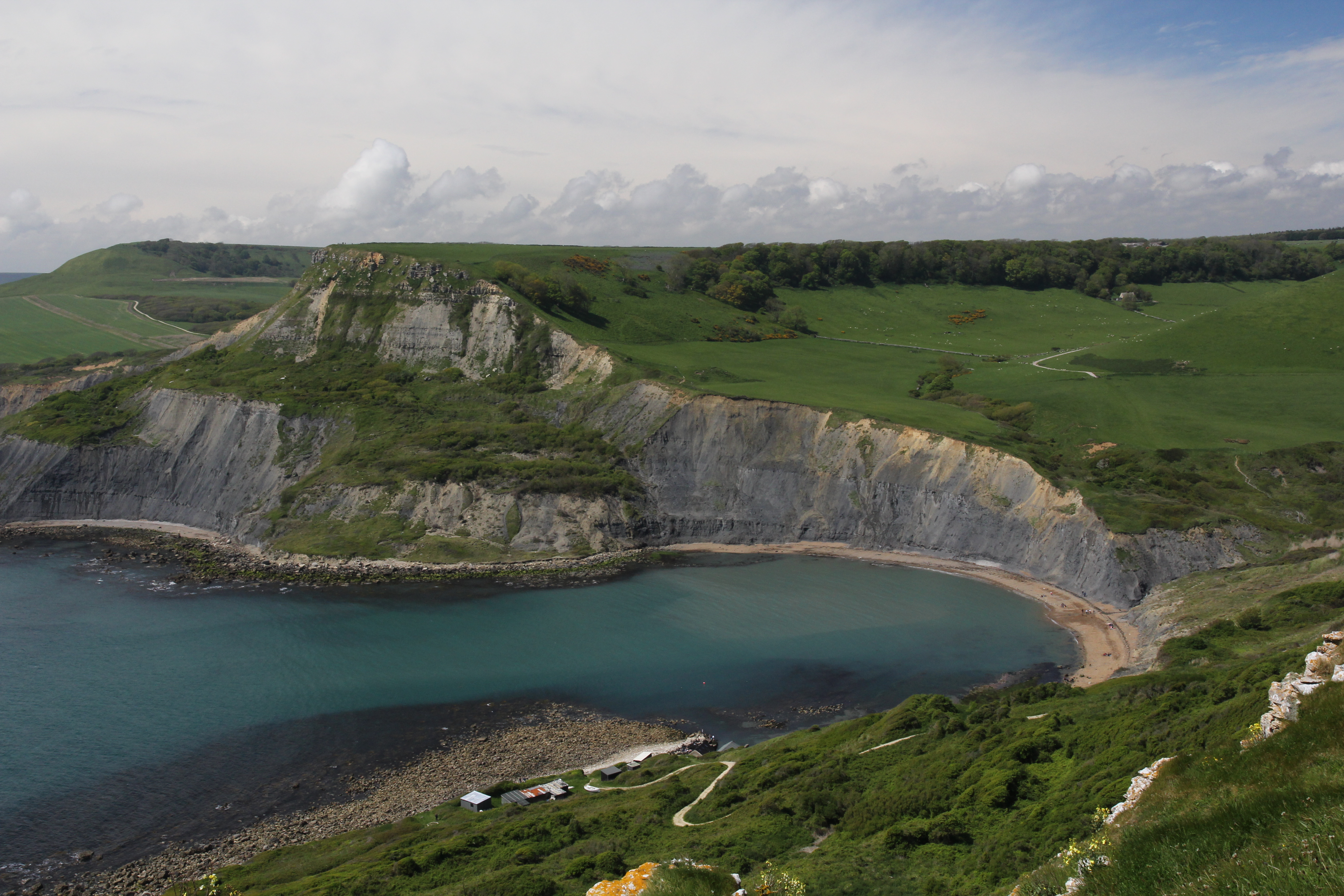
- Chapman's Pool, Dorset, seen from Emmetts Hill

- Location in Dorset
- Coordinates: 50.59348°N 2.06440°W

Chapman's Pool is a small cove to the west of Worth Matravers on the Isle of Purbeck, in Dorset, England.

== Geology ==
The rocks that form the cove are the upper parts of the Kimmeridge Clay, and are rich in fossils, especially bivalves and ammonites. Most of these fossils are flattened, but three-dimensional examples are preserved in the "Rotunda Nodules", including the age-marker ammonite, the coarse-ribbed Pavlovia rotunda.

Although manganese oxide nodules are seen, these are not local but from the cargo of the SSTreveal wrecked on the Kimmeridge Ledges below Hounstout on 10 January 1920.

== Emmetts Hill Memorial ==
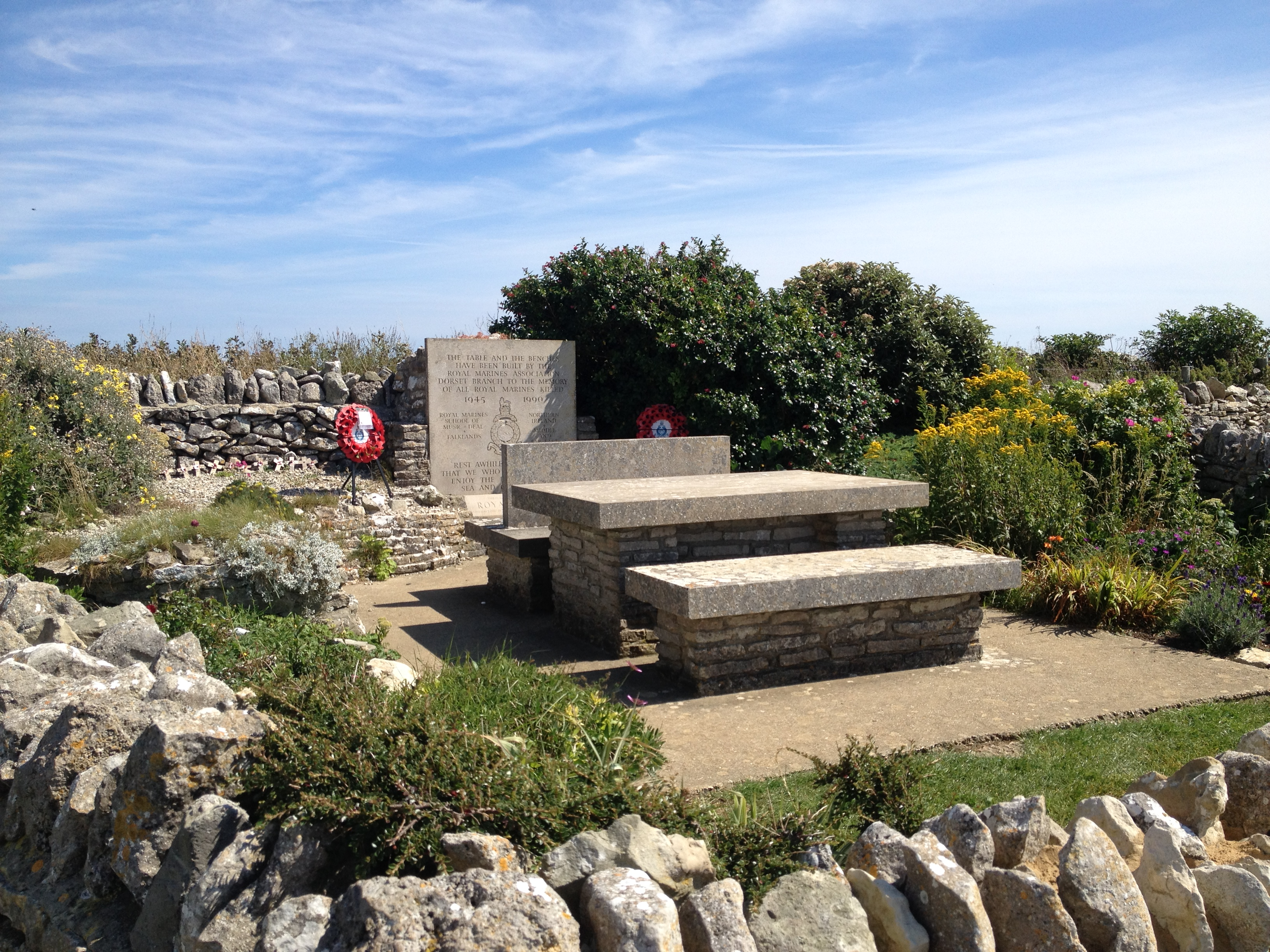
The Royal Marines memorial garden at Emmetts Hill

The Royal Marines Association memorial garden at Emmetts Hill was initiated following the IRA attack on the Royal Marines Barracks at Deal, home and training centre for the Royal Marines Band Service, in September 1989. The originator and organiser for the project was Colin Dishington, a member of the Dorset Branch of the RMA, since renamed the Poole and District Branch. A suitable site was chosen on an exposed headland looking out over the wild seas of Kimmeridge Bay with a view down to Chapman's Pool and along the rugged Jurassic coastline to Portland. The site also overlooks a training area used by the Royal Marines both during World War II and since; in addition, it fitted the beauty and tranquility required for the memorial location. The land, which is within the boundary of the Enscombe estate, was freely given by the then owner, David Scott (Lt Col ret'd), and right of access to the site is written into the deeds of the tenant farmer. It was decided to add to the initial Deal inscription to remember Royal Marines lost in all the conflicts from 1945 to 1990. In 2005 a new stone was added to commemorate ongoing losses of Royal Marines in current conflicts over more recent years. A service of dedication was conducted by the Rev. W. Aires, with the stone unveiled by Maj.-Gen. F. C. Barton, CB CBE RM, on 19 August 2006. Each year since the unveiling, a service has been conducted by the RMA at the memorial. The calls are sounded by a serving RM bugler from the RM Band Service. Details of the monument are registered with the Imperial War Museum's Monument section and local guides give reference to it. Access to the site is by footpath from the car park at Renscombe Farm. The original three-bar wooden rail fence has been replaced by a Purbeck stone wall to blend in with the stone walls of the area, and gives better protection to the garden, which is maintained by volunteers from the Poole and District RMA. As the site is on the main coastal path many people pause to reflect at the memorial, or use it as a resting point on their walk to enjoy the views. The ashes of RMA members have also been scattered in the monument gardens, and the families of those lost and resting elsewhere often visit the site, a truly peaceful and fitting memorial to the members of the Royal Marines family who have given their lives since WW2.

== Chapman's Pool Lifeboat ==
The Royal National Lifeboat Institution opened a lifeboat station at Chapman's Pool in 1866 to serve the area around Purbeck. The lifeboat was a 6-oared Self-Righter named George Scott. The station closed in 1880 owing to the great expense involved in up keeping the boathouse, the landslips that constantly swept down upon it and, lacking a village nearby, the dearth of local volunteers to serve on the lifeboat. The building still stands and is used as a fishing hut.

== See also ==
- List of Dorset beaches
- Jurassic Coast

== Gallery ==
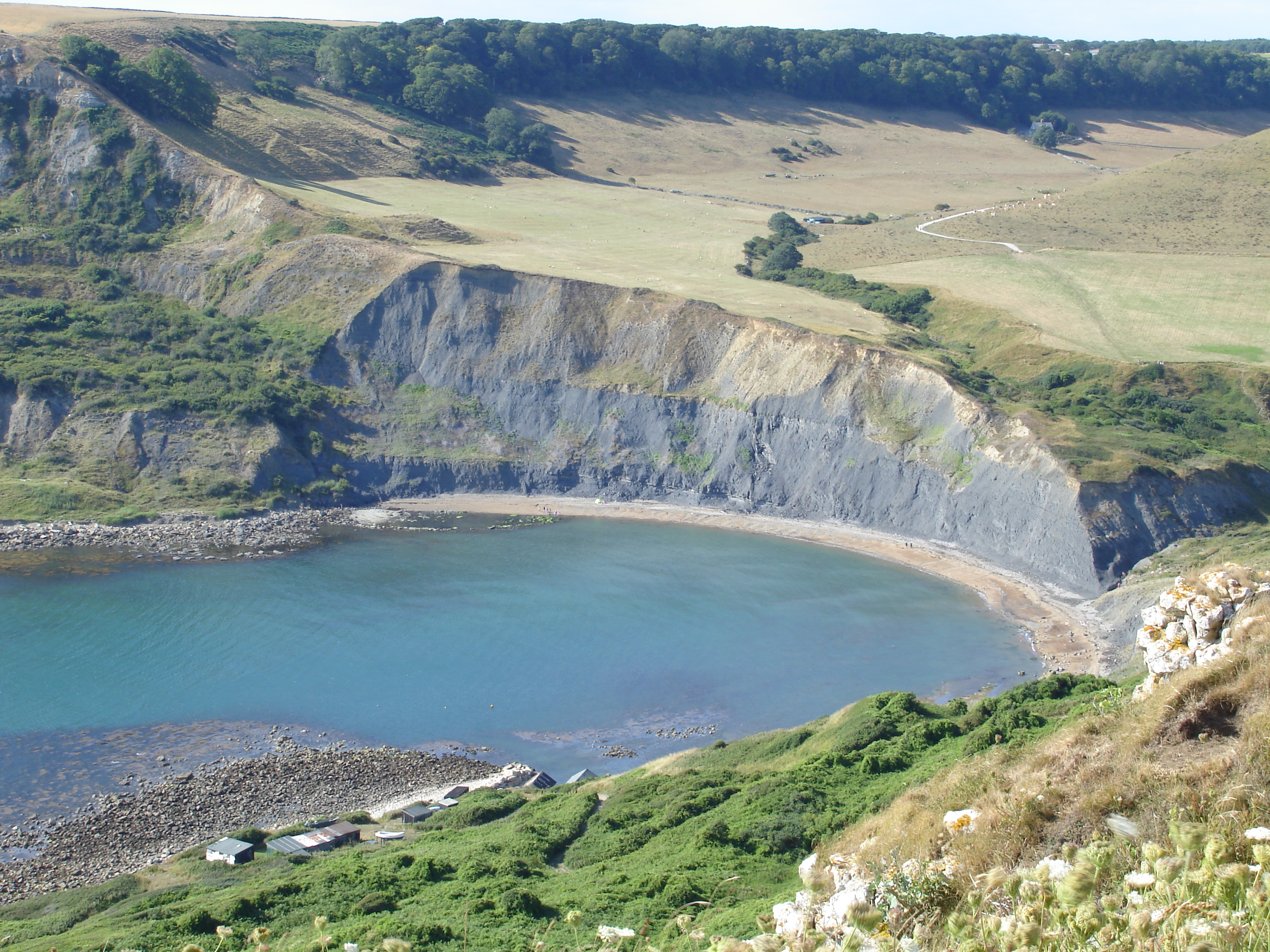
Chapman's Pool - detail

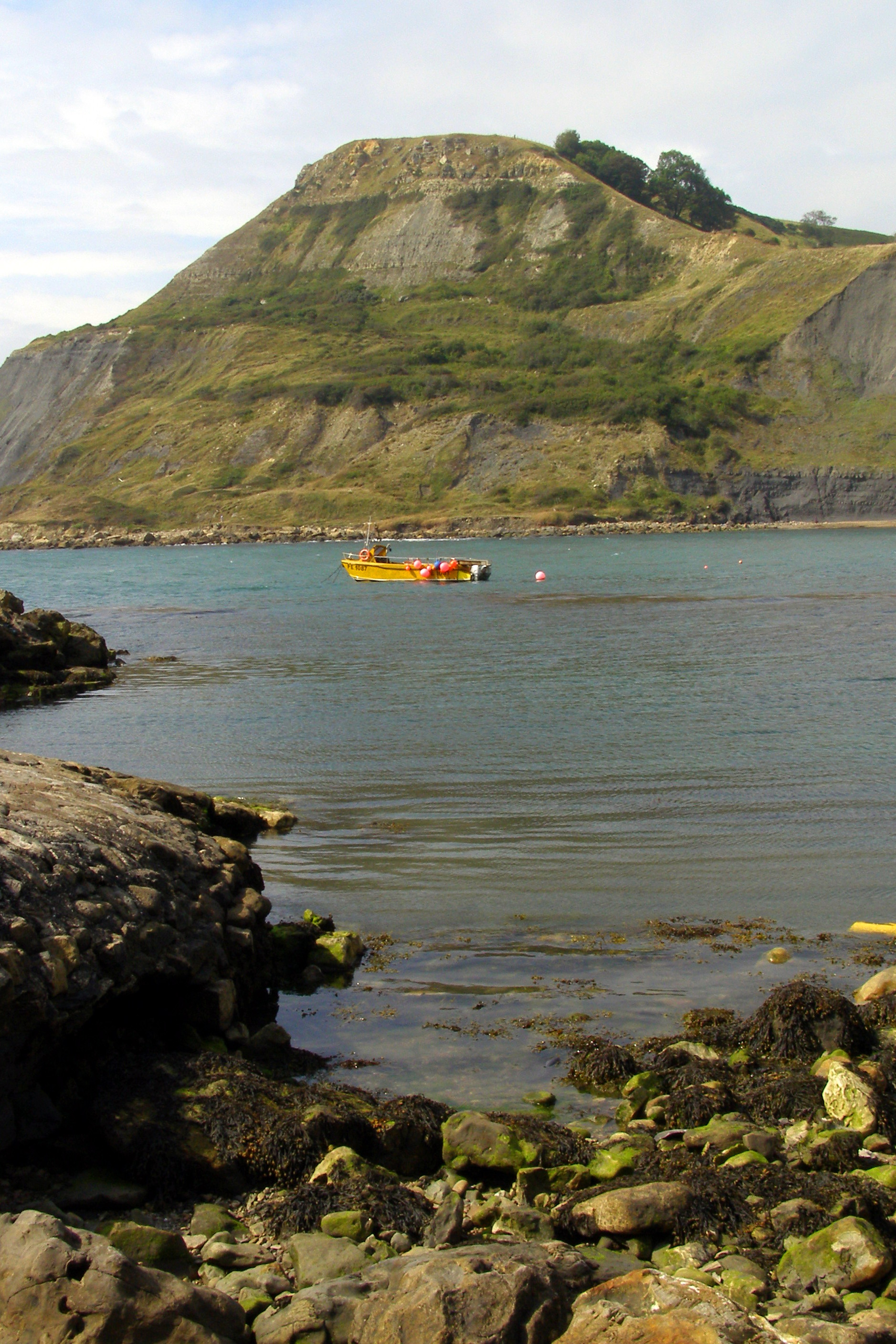
View across the cove to Hounstout

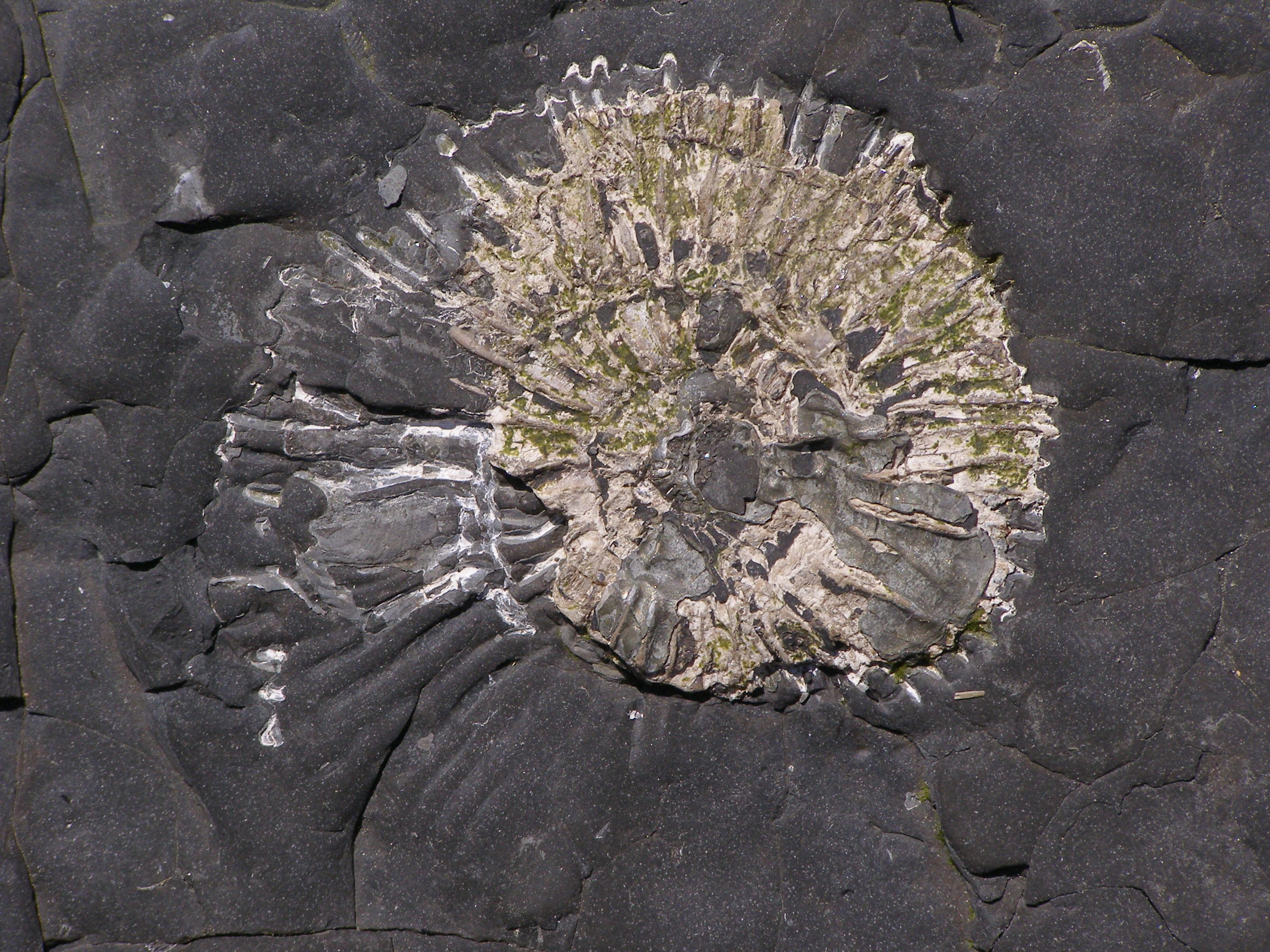
Crushed ammonite fossil on the beach

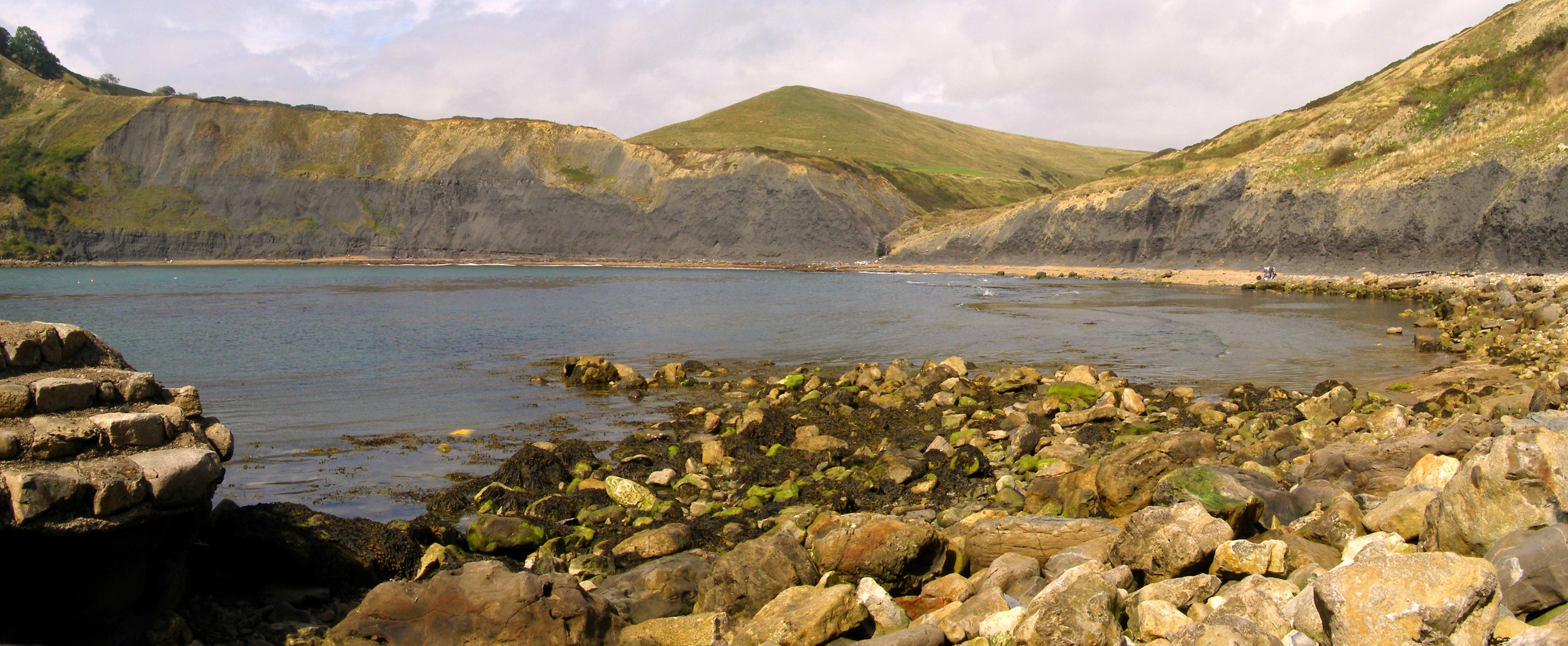
Panoramic view of the cove

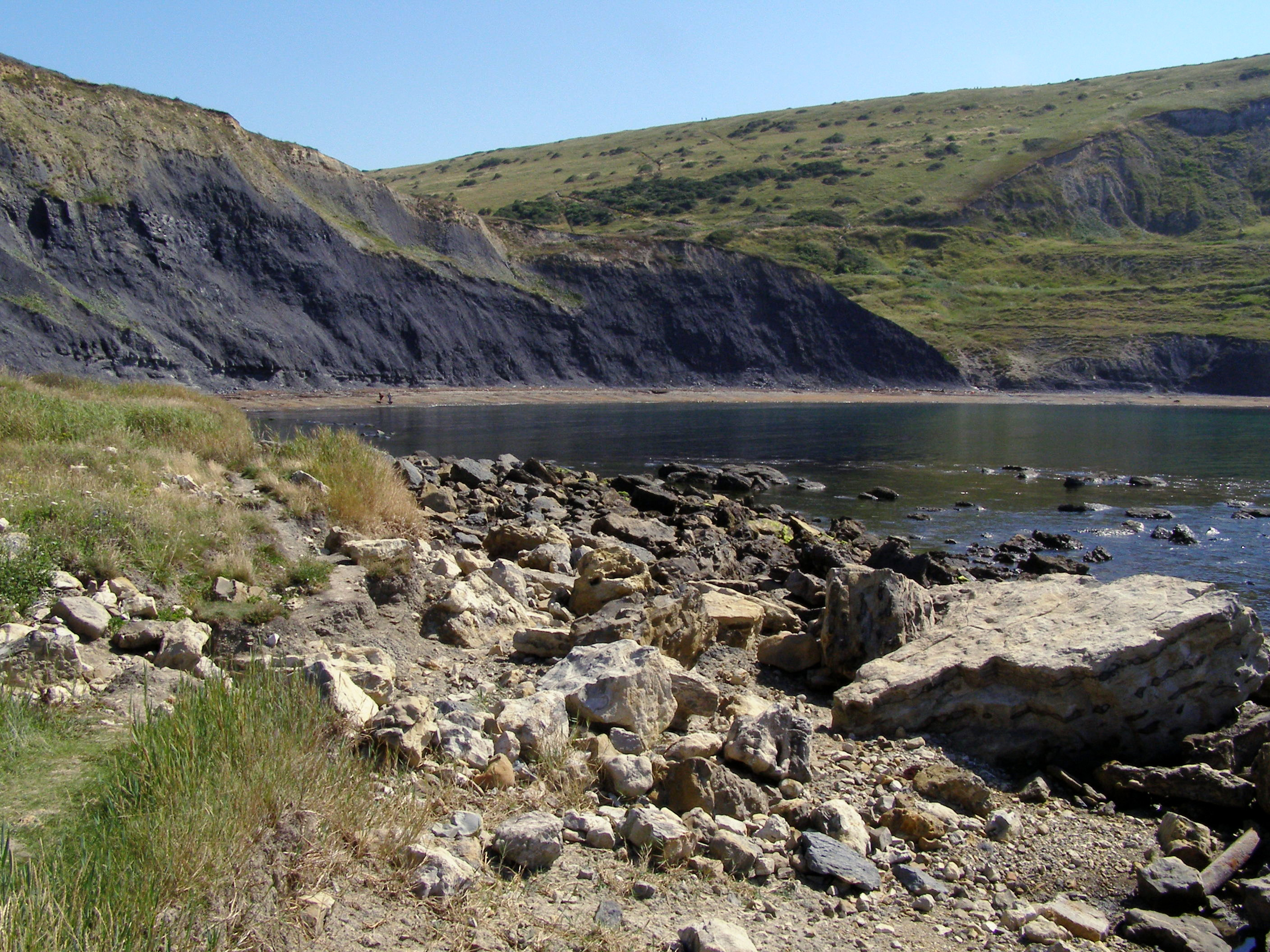
The cove from the west

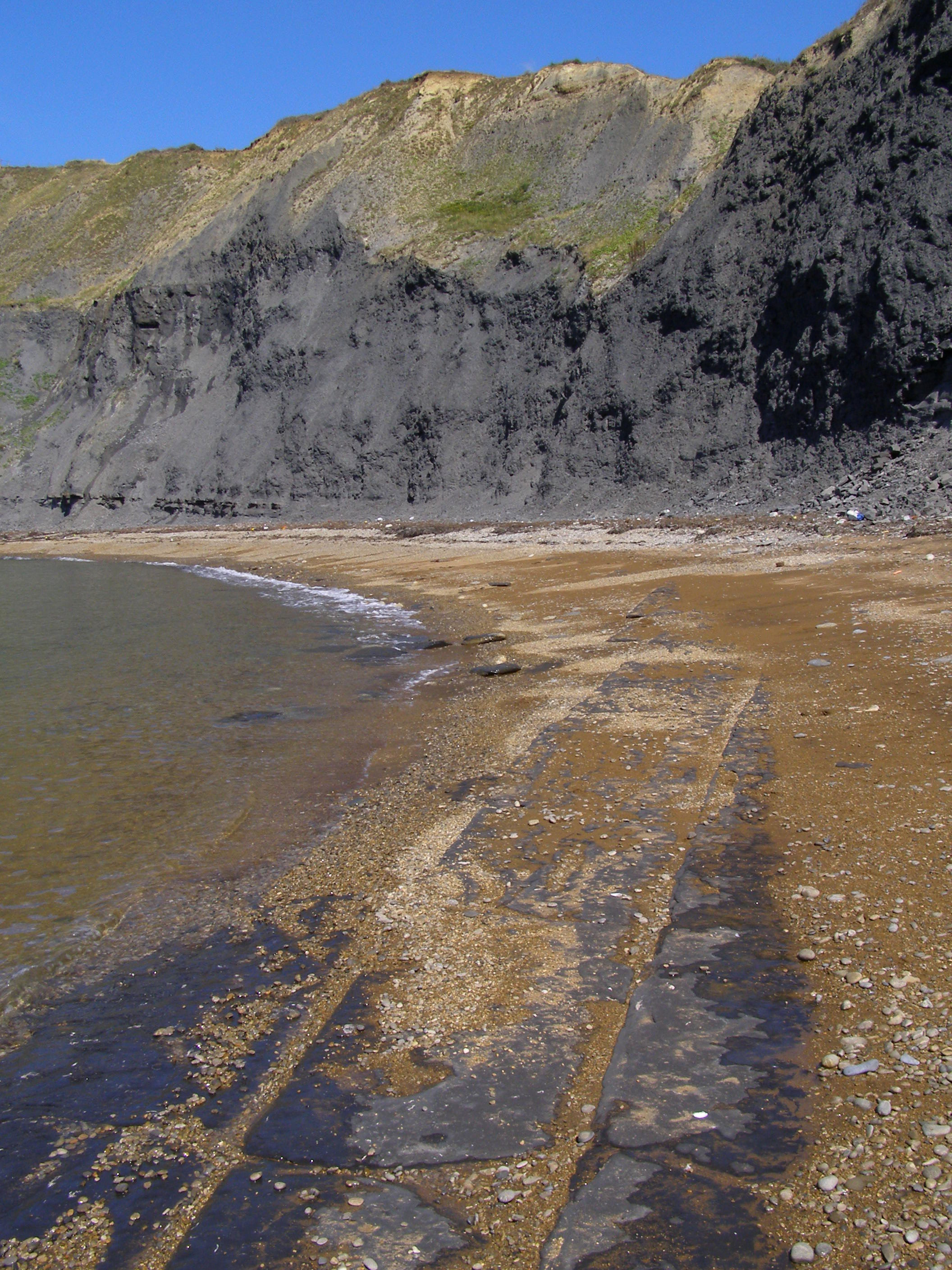
Shale beach and cliffs

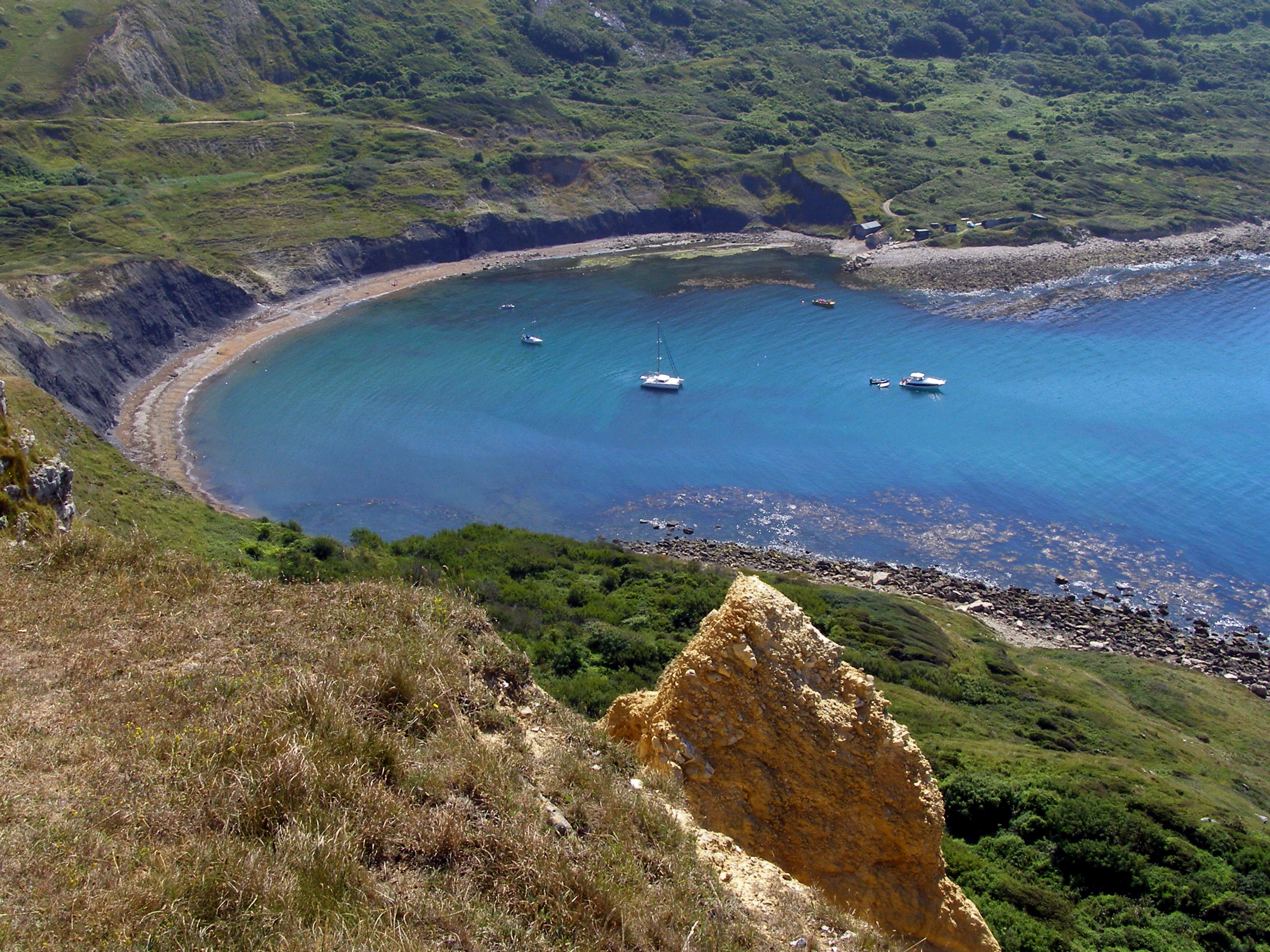
The cove from Hounstout cliff
