= Clay Ope =

Place in Dorset, England

Coordinates: 50.5483°N 2.4528°W

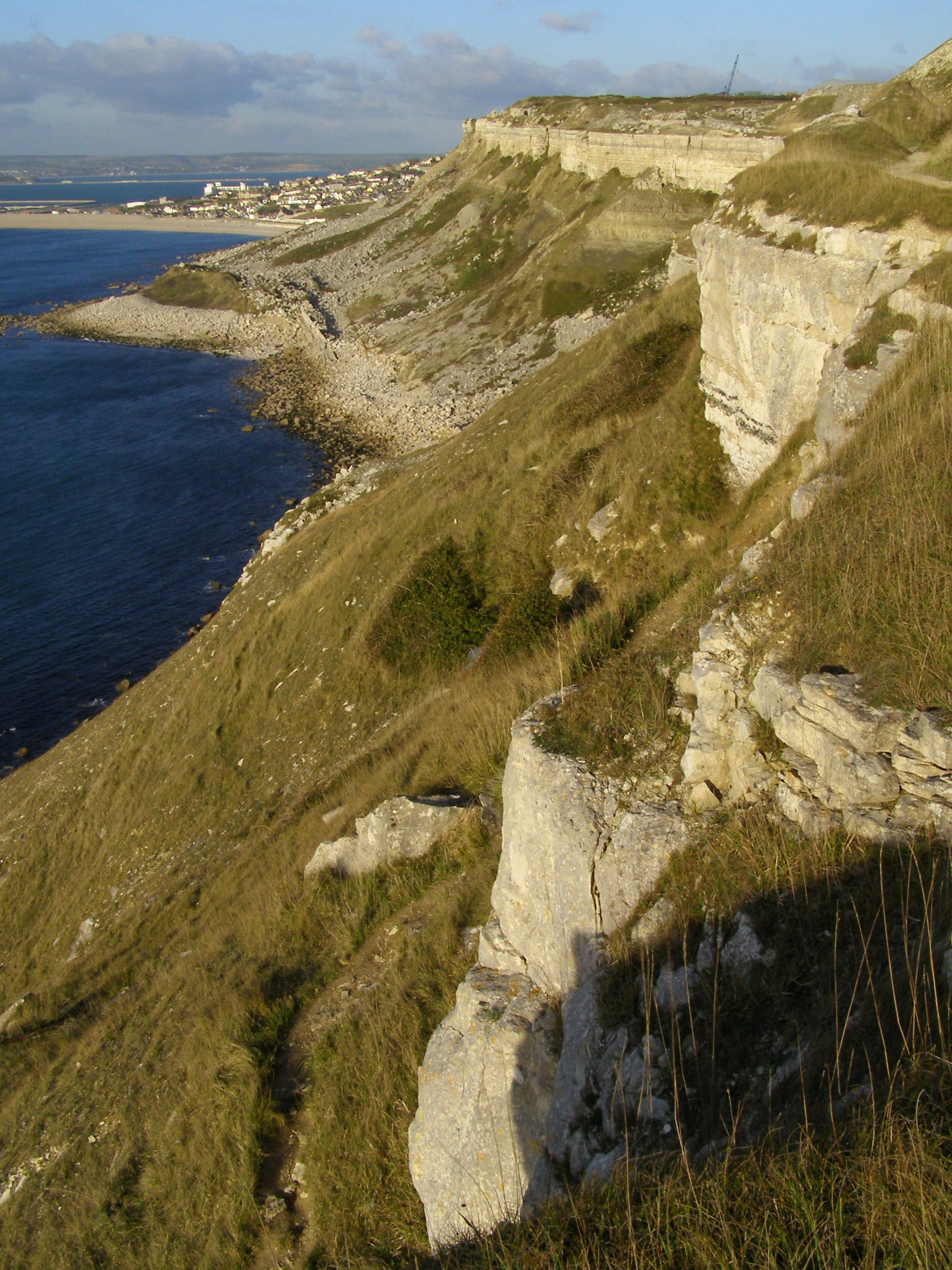
The cliffs above Clay Ope

Clay Ope is on the west side of the Isle of Portland in Dorset, England. It forms part of the Jurassic Coast. The geology of the area includes Purbeck Beds, Portland stone, Portland Sand, and Kimmeridge Clay. Above Clay Ope is West Cliff.
