= Purbeck Monocline =

Geological fold in southern England

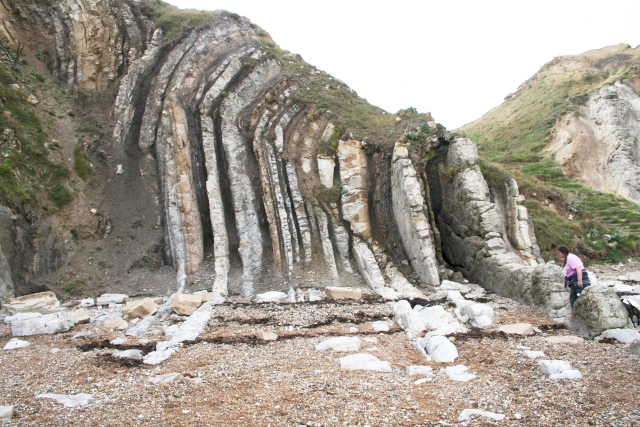
Vertical rock strata on the west side of St Oswald's Bay, at the western end of the Purbeck Monocline

The Purbeck Monocline is a geological fold in southern England. The term 'fold' is used in geology when one or more originally flat sedimentary strata surfaces are bent or curved as a result of plastic (i.e. permanent) deformation. A monocline is a step-like fold, in which one limb is roughly horizontal. The Purbeck Monocline was formed during the late Oligocene and early Miocene epochs, about 30 million years ago. It is the northernmost 'ripple' of the Alpine Orogeny.

The Purbeck Monocline gives rise to the prominent ridge of steeply dipping Cretaceous chalk which now forms the Purbeck Hills. This chalk band runs from Swyre Head via Flower's Barrow to Old Harry Rocks. From here the fold continues under the sea to The Needles and forms the central spine of the Isle of Wight. Here it is also known as the Purbeck-Isle of Wight Disturbance. The monocline continues under the English Channel as the Wight-Bray Monocline.

The Purbeck Hills run east–west through the small broad peninsula known as the Isle of Purbeck. The resistant beds of chalk and limestone form two ridges and the softer Wealden rocks between them have been eroded to form a valley.

Some visible features along the monocline include the disharmonic folds and faults, known as the Lulworth Crumple, at Stair Hole, Lulworth Cove, Arish Mell and at Peveril Point further east. These features also include the polygonal thrust ridges developed in the harder rock bands at Kimmeridge Bay and related to the growth of the monocline is the fault at Ballard Down.
