= Cow Corner =

Location on the Isle of Purbeck, England

Coordinates: 50°37′23″N 2°11′57″W

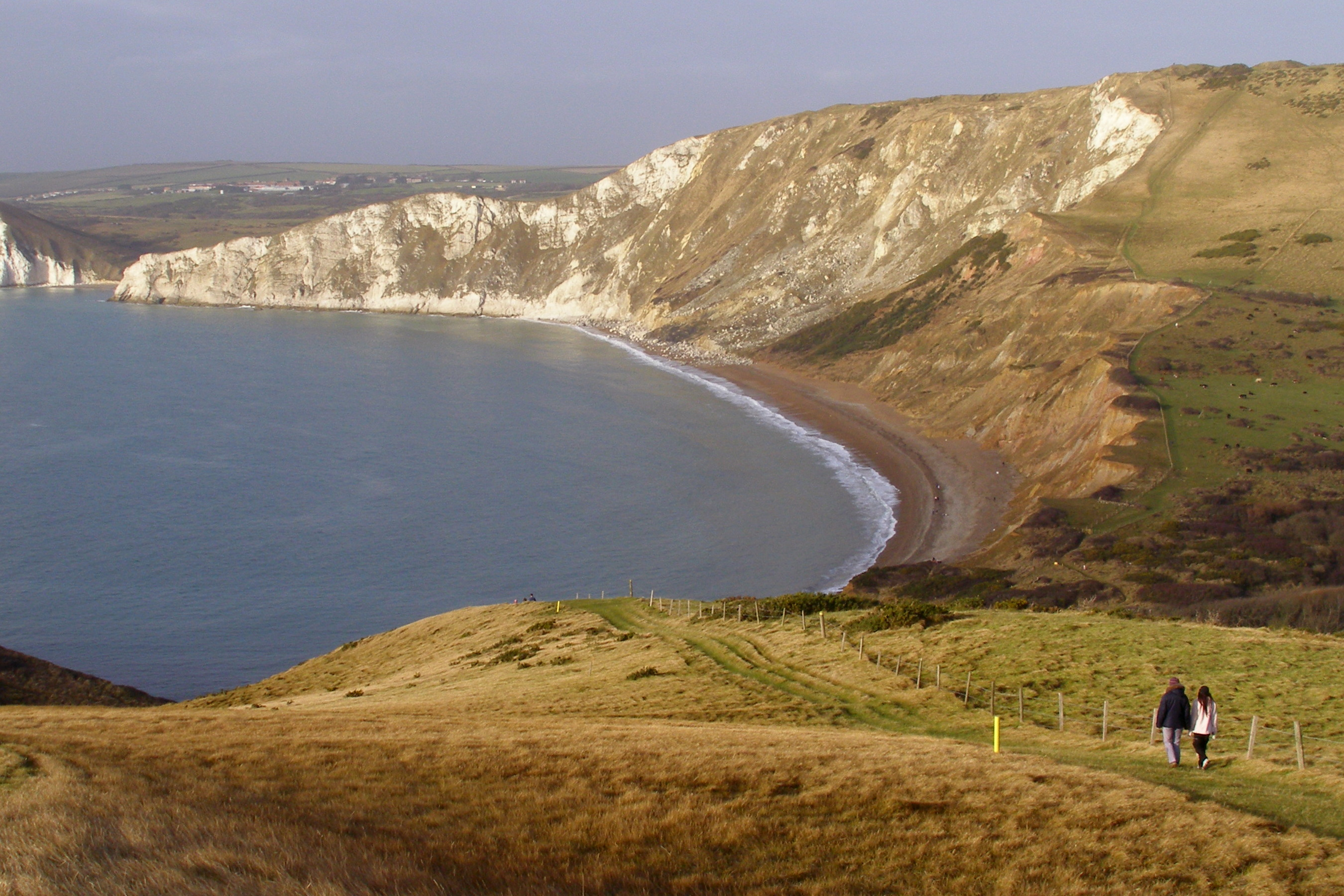
Looking down to Worbarrow Bay and Cow Corner. On the far left is Arish Mell

Cow Corner is the north-western end of Worbarrow Bay, a small secluded bay on the south coast of the Isle of Purbeck in Dorset, England.

== Location ==
Worbarrow Bay and Cow Corner are located about six kilometres south of Wareham und about 16 kilometres west of Swanage. The bay lies directly south of the ghost village of Tyneham. Access to Cow Corner is only possible on foot when the Lulworth army firing ranges are open to the public, either from Tyneham, or alternatively via the South West Coast Path.

== Geology ==
The geology of the Isle of Purbeck is very complex and this is shown very clearly along this stretch of coast. The northern side of Worbarrow Bay is mainly Upper and Middle Chalk. This is subject to frequent landslides because of the unstable underlying Gault Clay. At the top of the cliffs is the Iron Age hill fort on Flower's Barrow, which is threatened by erosion on its seaward side. The Flower's Barrow ridge forms the western end of the ridge which runs all the way to Ballard Point north of Swanage. The Chalk cliffs become lower to the west of Cow Corner and just beyond they form a knife-edge ridge that drops down to the little Bay of Arish Mell, where a stream has cut a gap in the Cretaceous hills.

The steep angular layers of rock are clearly visible in the cliffs of the bay. They reveal complex sedimentary folding, that deranged the geology of this neighbourhood about 30 million years ago, caused by the tectonic pressures as the African and European continents collided. The rock sediments were twisted horizontally and this is why the Chalks that are between 85 and 145 million years old are found at the rear of the bay.

The sediments that form Mupe Ledges and Worbarrow Tout are the 150-million-year-old Portland Limestones and the 147-million-year-old Purbeck Beds.

== Bibliography ==
- The Jurassic Coast Trust (2003). A Walk Through Time, the Official Guide to the Jurassic Coast. Coastal Publishing. ISBN 978-0-9544845-0-7.
