= Geology of Dorset =

Geology of English county

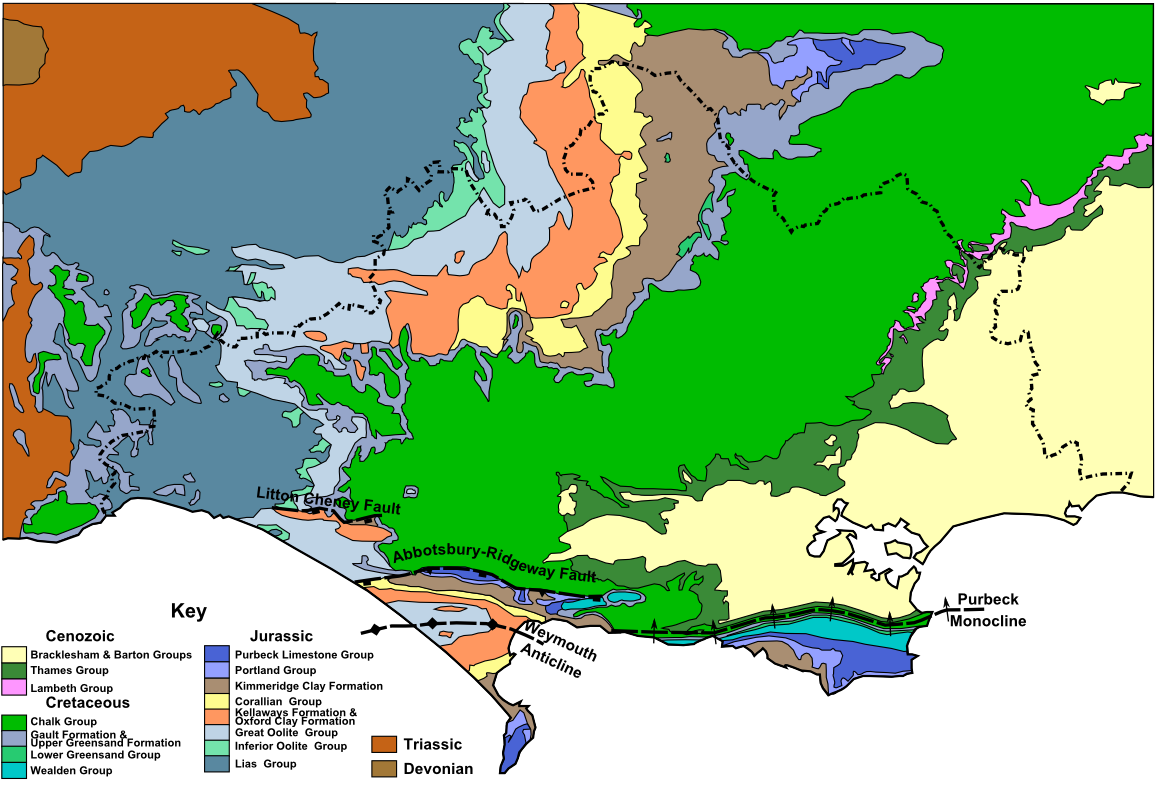
Geological map of Dorset

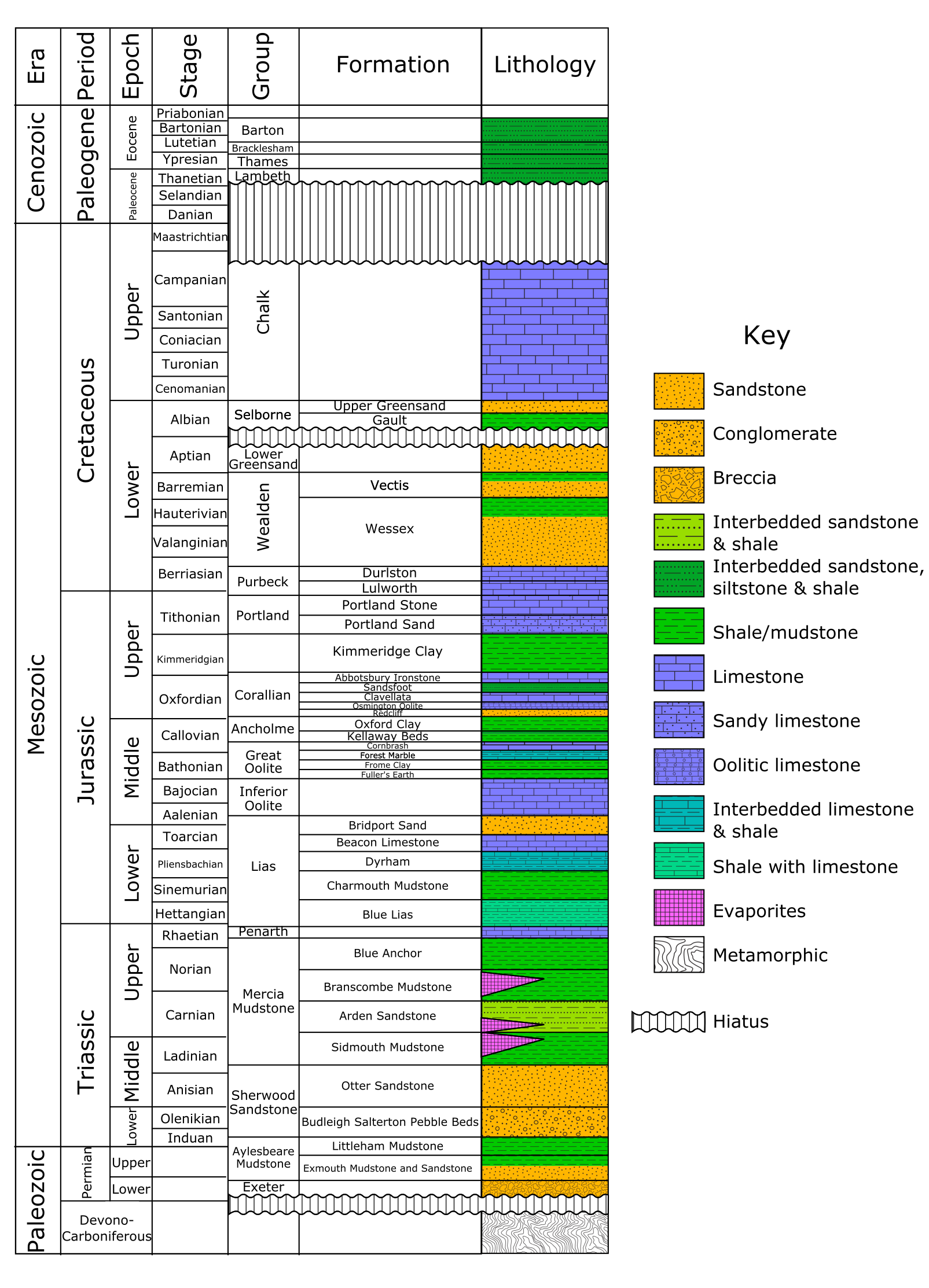
Stratigraphic column

Dorset /ˈdɔːrsɪt/ (or archaically, Dorsetshire) is a county in South West England on the English Channel coast. Covering an area of 2,653 square kilometres (1,024 sq mi); it borders Devon to the west, Somerset to the north-west, Wiltshire to the north-east, and Hampshire to the east. The great variation in its landscape owes much to the underlying geology, which includes an almost unbroken sequence of rocks from 200 to 40 million years ago (Mya) and superficial deposits from 2 Mya to the present. In general, the oldest rocks (Early Jurassic) appear in the far west of the county, with the most recent (Eocene) in the far east. Jurassic rocks also underlie the Blackmore Vale and comprise much of the coastal cliff in the west and south of the county; although younger Cretaceous rocks crown some of the highpoints in the west, they are mainly to be found in the centre and east of the county.

Dorset's coastline is one of the most visited and studied coastlines in the world because it shows, along the course of 95 miles (153 km) (including some of east Devon), rocks from the base of the Triassic, through the Jurassic, to the top of the Cretaceous, documenting the entire Mesozoic era with well-preserved fossils. Throughout Dorset there are a number of limestone ridges. The largest and most notable is the band of Cretaceous chalk that runs from the south-west to the north-east of the county and forms part of the Chalk Group that underlies much of the south of England, including Salisbury Plain, the Isle of Wight, and the South Downs. Between the bands of limestone and chalk are wide clay vales with flood plains.

South-east Dorset, around Poole, Bournemouth, and the New Forest, lies on younger and less resistant beds: Eocene clays (mainly London Clay), sands, and gravels. These rocks produce thin soils that historically have supported a heathland habitat. The chalk and limestone hills of Purbeck lie atop Britain's largest onshore oil field. The field, operated from Wytch Farm, produces a high-quality oil. Nearby is the world's oldest continuously pumping well at Kimmeridge, which has been in use since the early 1960s. The source of this oil is the organic-rich shales found in the lower Lias. Landslides along the coast have been known to ignite these shales, causing cliff fires, the most recent of which occurred in 2000.

== Devonian to Carboniferous ==
About 380 Mya, the landmass that later formed Southern Britain was some 19° south of the equator. It lay on the northern shore of an ocean basin separating the continents of Laurasia and Gondwanaland. When these continents collided to form the single supercontinent of Pangaea, the sediments on the ocean floor were pushed up and over, while the molten rock below the surface was forced out. Today, these igneous intrusions and the red sandstones, visible in the neighbouring county of Devon, slope away from west to east, and are deeply buried beneath younger deposits in Dorset.

== Triassic ==
Through most of this period, southern Britain experienced continental conditions, initially with deposition by large river systems forming the Sherwood Sandstone Group. This was succeeded by mudstones with evaporites (including locally thick deposits of halite) deposited in a desert environment, forming the Mercia Mudstone Group. A major change to marine conditions is shown by the mudstones with limestones and sandstones of the overlying Rhaetian age Penarth Group. No rocks from this period crop out in Dorset, but they are known to be present in the subsurface from hydrocarbon exploration drilling.

== Latest Triassic to Jurassic ==
Around 204 Mya, Dorset, now 30°N, was underwater, and the first ammonites (Psiloceras planorbis) appear among the shales and limestones that make up the lower Lias.

=== Lower Lias ===
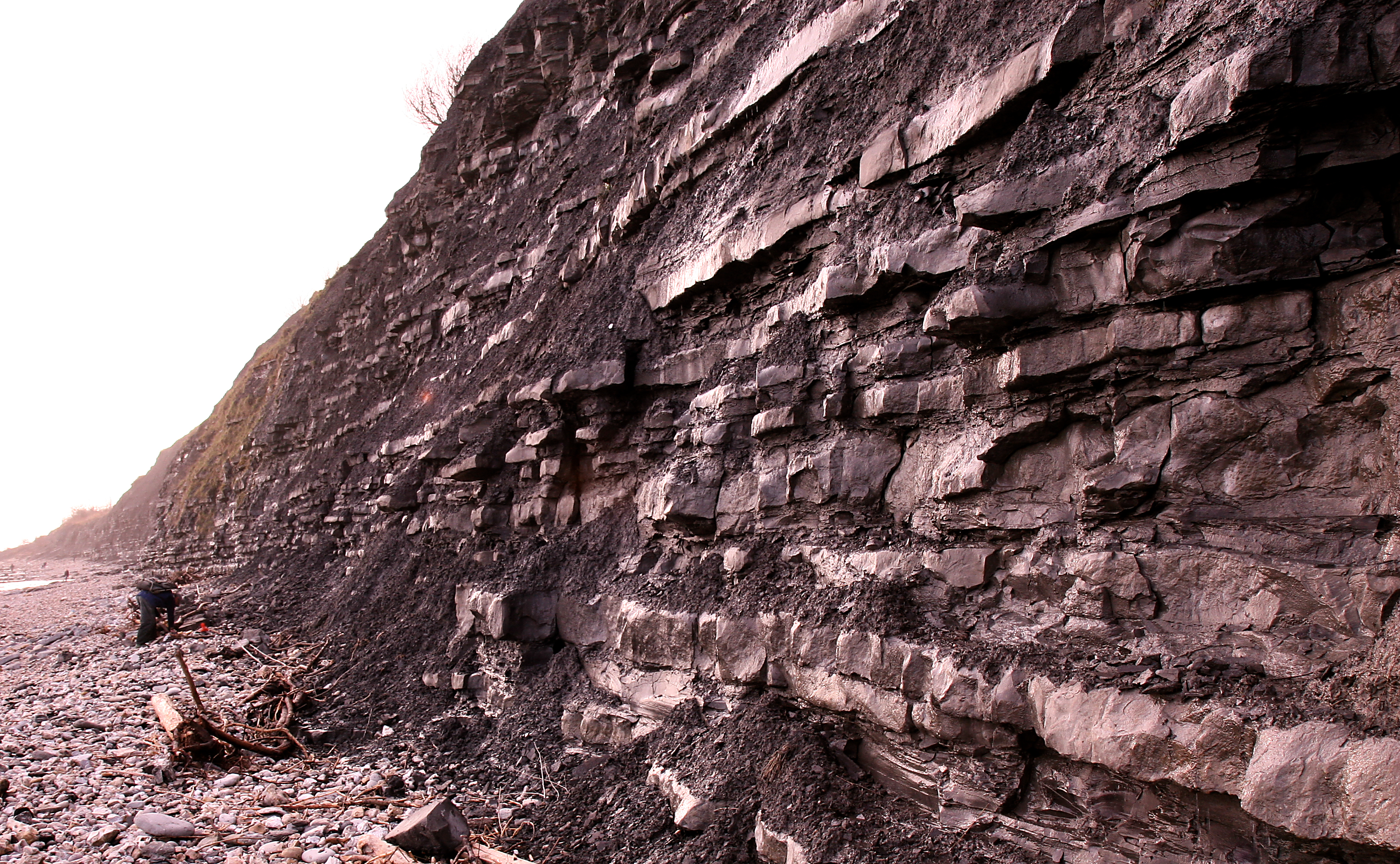
The Blue Lias cliffs at Lyme Regis

Formed during the Late Rhaetian to Pliensbachian, in what was then a shallow marine environment, the lower Lias is composed of Blue Lias, Black Ven Marls, and Green Ammonite Beds (Charmouth Mudstone Formation). Mostly covered by lush vegetation, it forms the floor of Marshwood Vale in the west of Dorset and can be seen in stream beds, where the land has been excavated, and along the coast to the west of Seatown. The sides of the vale are mainly made from the clays and sands of the upper and lower Lias, while younger strata from the Cretaceous Period (145–66 Mya), crown the higher points. The Blue Lias is the lowest of the Liassic strata and where it is visible on the coast near Lyme Regis is layered with hard limestone and oil-rich shale. The iron pyrites in the clay can heat up when exposed to the air and occasionally ignite the shales.

Around Lyme Regis, during the 18th and 19th centuries, the collection and sale of fossils became a popular occupation. Landslides and the excavation of the clays, used in cement production, exposed not only an abundance of ammonites of varying size, but also much larger specimens such as ichthyosaurs and plesiosaurs. Although these rocks were formed under water, the discovery of fossil wood, land-dwelling animals, and a pterosaur suggests that dry land was close by.

=== Middle Lias ===
Laid down during the Pliensbachian to Early Toarcian in a shallower marine environment that was subjected to much more turbulent weather conditions, the sediments of the middle Lias are not as muddy as those in the lower Lias, and are much nearer to silt and sand. These sands are thought to have come from the islands that now form part of Cornwall and South Wales. Again, inland exposure is poor, although the middle Lias is visible along the spring line of the hills that surround the Marshwood Vale. The cliffs either side of Eype and the coastal stretch between Thorncombe and Watton Cliff provide the best view. The base of the middle Lias is composed of three thick layers of calcareous sandstone beds separated by marls. These resistant bands form massive buttresses along the sea cliffs, and where eroded, boulder aprons on the foreshore.

Above these three layers is the Eype clay, which was probably deposited in deeper, calmer waters. Ammonites found in this layer had apparently been attacked by larger crustaceans. The fossilised remains of large numbers of brittle stars, found towards the end of this deposition, indicate that they were rapidly covered. Theories put forward suggest a great storm or tidal wave was the cause, and indeed many of the remains appear to have been swept along the sediment, some losing limbs on the way. This particular section of the Lias is appropriately known as the "starfish bed". The succeeding layers of Downcliffe and Thorncombe sands also appear to have been deposited in a periodically stormy environment where silts and sands dominate. Pebbles and cobbles are found here, encrusted with fossilised animals, which suggest that some of the sediments were already lithified; also, some evidence exists of localised fault activity. The last layer in the Middle Lias is the Marlstone Rock bed.

=== Upper Lias ===
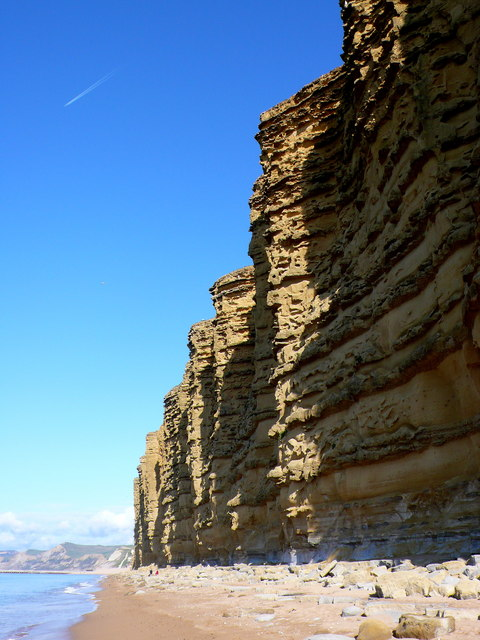
The distinctive yellow cliffs near West Bay, formed of Bridport Sand

The lowest part of the upper Lias, the Beacon Limestone Formation, formed during the Pliensbachian to Toarcian, around 182 Mya. It is known as the junction bed and, despite representing 3 million years of deposition, is only 0.6 to 1.5 m thick, where it can be seen at Eype Mouth. In Yorkshire, the equivalent stratum is around 100 m thick, suggesting that Dorset remained underwater much longer and was robbed of supplies of sand and clay. This bed is composed of fine-grained limestones from white to pale pink in colour. The clearest evidence of fault activity exists in a section of cliff between West Bay and Eype Mouth, where the junction bed thickens in a section of steps, and fractures in the rock contain sediment from the ocean bed, which most likely was sucked in as the cracks opened.

The remaining part of the upper Lias is the bright yellow Bridport sandstone of Toarcian age, which gives the cliffs between West Bay and Burton Bradstock their distinctive colour. The sands form a band that runs inland to Yeovil. In the east of the county, these sands are some 900 m below the surface and form the Wytch Farm oilfield's middle reservoir.

=== Inferior Oolite ===
The succeeding Inferior Oolite was deposited in a shallow, tropical marine environment, 35° north of the equator, during the Aalenian to early Bathonian. It is only 2 m thick in the south, but increases to 20 m in the north, near Sherborne. It contains many fossils, including bryozoans, brachiopods, ammonites, belemnites, gastropods, bivalves, and echinoids, and, like the previous middle and upper Lias, shows signs of fault-controlled deposition. In some places, the sea floor appears to have been breached, and sediments and fossils were trapped like those in the junction bed between West Bay and Eype. Most of Dorset was starved of sediment, and condensed limestones collected. These limestone beds are often iron-rich, lending them a rusty colour. One particular bed, exposed at Burton Cliff, contains large numbers of orange, discus-shaped concretions, which on closer inspection reveal themselves to be pieces of shell from a species of mussel, coated with a thin layer of iron-rich sediment.

In the upper section of the Inferior Oolite, two beds are packed with numerous types of sponges, which can be seen around Shipton Gorge and Burton Bradstock. Despite being formed in a marine environment, the oolite, like the lower Lias, contains some fossilised remains of land-dwelling creatures, including two species of Megalosaurus that were found near Sherborne.

=== Great Oolite ===
Fuller's Earth Formation clays were deposited across much of southern Dorset when the continental shelf subsided, forcing the region deeper underwater during the early Bathonian. The lower clays are visible at Burton Bradstock and contain large numbers of Bositra buchi. These bivalves may have been able to swim freely, thus able to avoid the soupy mud on the sea floor. A limestone known as Fuller's Earth rock is found in the north-west of the county, between the clays south and east of Sherborne. It is rich in ammonites and bivalves. Previously referred to as the Upper Fuller's Earth Clay, the succeeding Frome Clay can be seen to the west of West Bay, where it forms the major part of the West Cliff. It contains many brachiopods, particularly in the Weymouth Anticline where the oyster beds are 5 m thick. At the junction between the Frome Clay and the overlying Forest Marble is the Boueti Bed, so called because of the large numbers of the brachiopod Goniorhynchia boueti found there. It is best viewed on the Herbury peninsula south of Langton Herring. The limestone known as Forest Marble is not a true metamorphic marble, but it takes a high polish and has been used as a building material and marble substitute for many years. Outcrops of Forest Marble are concentrated around the Weymouth Anticline, the coastal escarpment between Burton Bradstock and Abbotsbury, and inland as far as Bothenhampton, where they disappear below younger Cretaceous deposits. Surfacing once more at Rampisham, they turn east and then north into Somerset. The limestone does not form one continuous bed as previously thought, but rather forms pockets in a formation that is predominantly clay. Severe tropical storms likely swept up large quantities of shells and other invertebrates and deposited them in this way. The formation of the Forest Marble suggests a shallowing of the sea, and the remains of pieces of tree and bits of land-dwelling animals are found among the turtles, frogs, and salamanders within.

Above the Forest Marble lies the Cornbrash sequence of early Callovian age, which is dominated by rubbly limestone. Unsuitable for building stone, these limestones have been used for lime production and road construction. In the north of the county, an already lithified Cornbrash floor was being eroded, and the resulting pebbles gathered serpulid worms, bryozoans, and bivalves as they rolled around beneath the shallow sea.

=== Ancholme Group ===
From the early Callovian to the early Kimmeridgian, the future Dorset, at 36°N, still had a tropical climate and the limestones, clays, silts, and sands from this period were laid down in a marine environment that ranged from deep water to tidal shallows. The shallow water in which the Cornbrash limestones were deposited was followed by marginally deeper water in which the Kellaway Beds were laid down. The Kellaway Beds are only visible in the banks of streams and rivers, and the brick pits at Chickerell and Rampisham, where the succeeding Oxford Clays were quarried. The Oxford Clays were deposited in much deeper water and cover the valley floors between Weymouth and the Blackmore Vale. They can also be seen in the cliffs at Tidmoor Point, Jordan Hill, and the previously mentioned brick pits at Chickerell. Poor exposure, coupled with a decline in the brick industry, has made detailed mapping of the clays difficult, and now relies heavily on trenches dug for services. These excavations have unearthed some impressive examples of Septarian nodules.

The exposure of Nothe Grit, to the south of Weymouth, suggests a return to shallower water conditions and a more turbulent environment. In the following 4.5 million years, a cycle of lagoonal, tidal, and deep-water environments caused by worldwide fluctuations in sea levels deposited beds of sand, clay, and limestone across the entire county. The Corallian strata can be seen on the Weymouth anticline, between Abbotsbury and Osmington. It then disappears to emerge as a low escarpment between Mappowder and Cucklington on the Somerset border. Near the top of this formation is the Ringstead Waxy Clay, in which large delta-shaped oysters are found, and at the top of the Corallian is the Ringstead Coral Bed.

Benecliff Grit, a soft sandstone containing large doggers, is well exposed at the headland, Bran Point. Once a reservoir, oil sometimes seeps from the cliff here, and an oily residue is present in the sands nearby.

=== Kimmeridge Clay ===
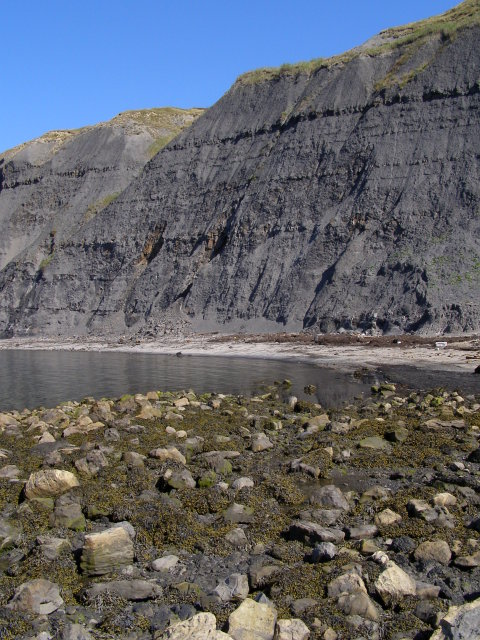
Kimmeridge Clay in the cliffs at Egmont Bight

The varied rock types of the Corallian are superseded by the Kimmeridge Clay, a bed of dark clays and shales up to 500 m thick. These deposits occurred in a deep marine environment, 38° north. Deposited in an oxygen-deficient environment, the Kimmeridge beds make up the major part of the Purbeck Monocline and the periphery of the Weymouth Anticline. They form a low-lying band running north to south through the Blackmore Vale, and underpin the strip of land between the Isle of Portland and the mainland. The unusual iron-rich sediment near Abbotsbury was, in a departure from the norm, deposited in shallow iron-rich water, and the pale bands throughout the formation were caused by coccoliths following periodic blooms of algae.

Many of the fossilised remains are squashed flat, indicating that the Kimmeridge beds were heavily compacted, perhaps to an eighth of their original thickness. This was not sufficient to produce oil reservoirs like those beneath the North Sea, yet the oil-rich shales have, in the past, been economically important as a local fuel.

=== Portland Group ===
Whether the formations created between the Upper Jurassic and Lower Cretaceous were deposited across the whole of Dorset like the preceding beds, and subsequently eroded, or only formed in the areas in which they are now found is unclear.

The Portland sands were created in a deep marine environment, whereas the Portland stone was a near-shore deposit. The lower Portland sand formation, usually greyish-blue in colour, consists of dolomite beds best viewed on the West Weares, Gad Cliff, and Hounstout. The overlying Portland stone is a distinctive white oolite containing thick-shelled fossils and marine algae. The marine algae, which formed large reefs, are responsible for the occasional stacked and arched bands in the formation and are best viewed in the Roach, an extremely fossiliferous limestone confined to the north of Isle of Portland.

To the north of the oolite is a fine-grained limestone, which was deposited in calm, shallow water. It contains flint-like rocks known as chert, which, were it not for the presence of very large ammonites, might be mistaken for an early chalk. Previously thought to be around the middle of the Purbeck Strata, modern research suggests that the boundary between the Jurassic and Cretaceous periods lies within the basal few metres of the overlying Lower Purbeck.

== Latest Jurassic to Cretaceous ==
=== Purbeck Group ===
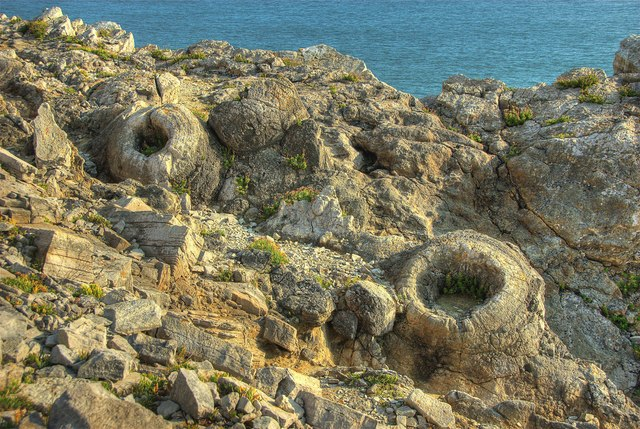
Part of the Fossil Forest at Lulworth

The Purbeck Limestone Group is a succession of limestones, shales, and clays named after the Isle of Purbeck, laid down in the latest Tithonian to late Berriasian, mainly in very shallow lagoons and freshwater lakes, with only occasional marine influence at the lower levels where halite, gypsum, and other evaporites are found. The muddled sediments around Lulworth are thought to be caused by a thick layer of these evaporites dissolving. Evidence also exists of uplift and erosion of earlier formations. The climate around this time had changed from a tropical to a subtropical one, with pronounced wet and dry seasons as indicated by the growth rings in the fossilised trees also found in the lower levels of the Purbeck strata. These trees grew around the low coastal areas and were, from time to time, subjected to drowning from the sea. The fallen trees and their stumps became covered by stromatolites which trapped sediments. The limestones at this level, which vary greatly in colour, are composed of densely packed shells of the freshwater snail Viviparus. Their ability to take a very high polish has led them to become known as Purbeck Marble. Like the older Forest Marble, it is a sedimentary marble rather than a true metamorphic one.

The Purbeck Limestone Group has yielded a diverse selection of fossilised remains, including rare reptiles, amphibians, and mammals, for which the formation has become internationally important.

=== Wealden Group ===
The Wealden Beds are confined to the south, and increase in thickness from 107 to 716 m, between Upwey and Swanage. By the latest part of the Berriasian, the waters covering Dorset's landmass had subsided, leaving the area almost completely terrestrial save for the large rivers that dominated it. These rivers drained the upland areas to the north and west, and were responsible for depositing much of the succeeding sediment across southern Dorset. Comprising clays, silts, sands, and grits, they cover the floors of the valleys between Lulworth and Swanage. The sands and grits are also exposed in the cliffs there, and form ridges along the valleys. Traces of granite from Cornubia, the landmass that later became Cornwall, were also washed down. The Wealden Beds contain a great deal of plant matter and charcoal, indicating periodic fires in the region. At Mupe Bay, some of the sands have been bound together by oil and formed into sandstone boulders, suggesting that oil generation had already begun when these sands were deposited.

=== Lower Greensand and Selborne groups ===
The marginal marine incursions that occurred in the previous period increased in severity until Dorset was completely underwater by the Aptian. The geology from this period indicates a gradual flooding of the county from the south-east to the north-west. The earliest deposit, the Lower Greensand, covers the preceding Wealden Beds in the south, and the Oxford and Kimmeridge clays in the north. It is so called because of its green colour, which is caused by the presence of the mineral glauconite.

In the west, overlying the eroded Lias, is a thin layer of Gault Clay of Albian age, which decreases in thickness from 27 to 7 m the further west it stretches, and can be located by the spring lines around the chalk ridges and escarpments. The water that sits between these two beds is responsible for the many landslips that have occurred throughout the county's history. Around Compton Valence, it lies on the Fuller's earth, whereas between Ringstead and White Nothe, it covers the Kimmeridge Clay and the Portland and Purbeck strata. Because geologists are certain all the formations from the Lias to the Kimmeridge Clay were deposited over the whole of the county, the Gault clay reveals the scale of uplift and erosion that must have taken place before Dorset was flooded. The overlying Gault is revealed in the spring lines around the chalk ridges and escarpments. This water is also responsible for the many landslips throughout Dorset's history from the prehistoric to modern times.

Above the Gault is the Upper Greensand, which varies from the golden sands that crown the West Dorset heights, such as Pilsdon Pen and Golden Cap, to the rubbly sandstones found in the centre of the county. The fossiliferous, green sandstone found around Shaftesbury contains many ammonites, which, when compared to other deposits, indicates condensed deposition during different periods at different locations, and detailed analysis reveals that basement structures were still active at this time.

=== Chalk Group ===
The sea levels remained more or less unchanged until the end of the Cretaceous period, and despite Dorset having moved even further north to 40°, the climate had reverted to a tropical one. During the Late Cretaceous epoch, the sea deposited an enormous amount of chalk across the county, perhaps as much as 300 m more than currently remains. The first chalk deposits contained sands and grits thought to have originated in Cornubia. This gritty chalk was deposited across central Dorset, and can clearly be seen in the sides of Eggardon Hill. As the water deepened, plankton, coccoliths, and foraminifera became the main source for the calcareous soup, which would later form the Dorset chalk. The chalk forms a narrow strip inland between Studland and Worbarrow Bay, when it reaches the coast once more. A much wider strip continues westward along the coast until it meets the wide swathe of chalk that cuts north-west across the county and forms the south-east point of the Hampshire Basin. Generally, the Dorset chalk is too soft to be used as a building stone except along the Ridgeway, where faulting and folding produced a particularly hard variety popularly used by the Romans in their mosaics. The chalk often contains larger fossils, including ammonites, belemnites, and brachiopods. Flint occurs throughout in both nodule and tabular layers.

The iridium-rich layer of sediment, found globally at the K-Pg boundary, is missing in Dorset. This may be due to the uplift and erosion that removed the upper layers of the chalk. The sediments resting on the Dorset chalk are, for the same reason, distinctly different from those in other parts of the world, and the remains of the plants and animals within are much more recent.

== Early Paleogene ==
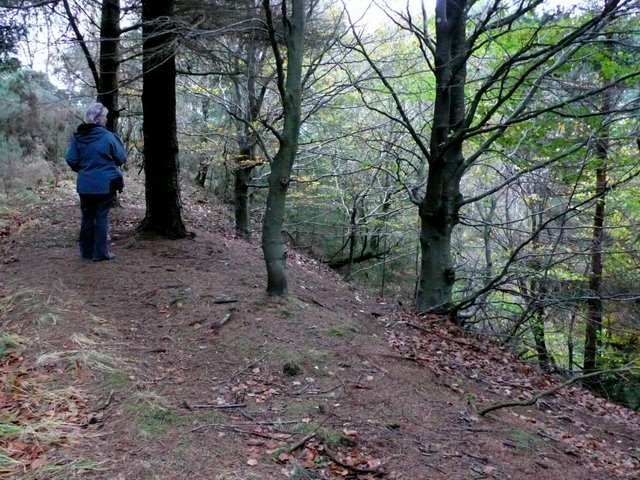
The edge of Culpepper's Dish, a large doline on Briantspuddle Heath

The expansion of the North Atlantic, which first occurred during the Triassic period, now reached a point where it was affecting the Dorset landscape. Areas that were previously underwater were exposed to erosion as the chalk was folded and forced upwards. The early deposits from this period, found across South-East England, do not occur in Dorset. The small amounts found in Devon, however, coupled with the many solution holes found across the Dorset chalk, suggest that erosion may have removed them. Some of the larger solution holes, known as dolines, are found on the heaths between Dorchester and Bere Regis. Near Briantspuddle is Culpepper's Dish, 86 m wide and over 21 m deep.

The first deposits found from this period in Dorset are the Reading Formation clays. A subdivision of the Lambeth Group, they are visible above the chalk at Studland. Mottled, brightly coloured, and generally lacking fossils, the clays are thought to be deposited beneath lagoons. In the east of the county, however, fossilised remains of gastropods and sharks' teeth have been found alongside flint pebbles, clearly identifying these clays as marine deposits.

The Bracklesham Group, found across much of the Dorset portion of the Hampshire Basin, was mainly deposited by rivers, and forms the foundations of the Dorset heathland. The frequent and heavy rains that occurred during this period transported large amounts of material from northern uplands across the Purbeck and Weymouth areas. A thick layer of chert gravel from the Purbeck strata can be found on Blackdown Hill near Portesham, but whether it was carried there or is the remains of an earlier deposit is unknown. Blocks of quartzite can be found across the downlands of southern Dorset, and these sarsens have been used in some of the local prehistoric monuments.

To the north and east of the county, much finer sands and gravels are found, including ball clay, which was widely mined on the heaths around Wareham. The fine particles that make up the clay are believed to have originated in the west, where rocks were being broken down by the alternating dry, humid conditions and torrential rain, which in turn formed rivers and carried the material to its current position. Overlying the clay is the Agglestone grit, an iron-cemented sandstone, which forms the Agglestone near Studland, and has been used in the buildings in and around the heathland where it is found.

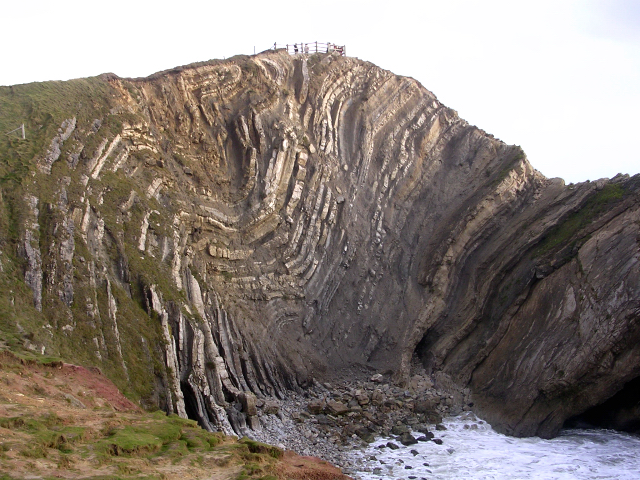
The crumpled rock strata at Stair Hole caused by a collision between the African and Eurasian plates

Fossilised palms taken from the cliffs at Bournemouth confirm that Dorset had a tropical climate at the time. Creech Barrow Hill is crowned with a unique early Eocene limestone that has yielded some important fossils. Outcrops of rock from the Barton Group occur along the coast between Bournemouth and Hengistbury Head.

== Late Paleogene to Neogene ==
During this period, Dorset drifted a further 9° north, the climate cooled rapidly, and by the late Eocene was temperate. Mainly terrestrial with fresh and brackish water environments, the county, despite its low-lying nature, remained largely without marine influences except for some minor incursions at the end of the ice ages. The late Palaeogene deposits that filled the Hampshire Basin as the sea levels fell are not found in Dorset, nor are the Neogene, which are absent from virtually all of the British Isles.

The collision of the African Plate and Eurasian Plate that occurred around this time caused a violent uplift in the south of the county, the results of which can be seen clearly at Stair Hole, where the strata run almost vertically. Further, but less dramatic folding and uplift, along the county's subsurface faults, coupled with continuing erosion of Jurassic and Cretaceous sediments, created Dorset's modern landscape and drainage patterns.

== Quaternary ==
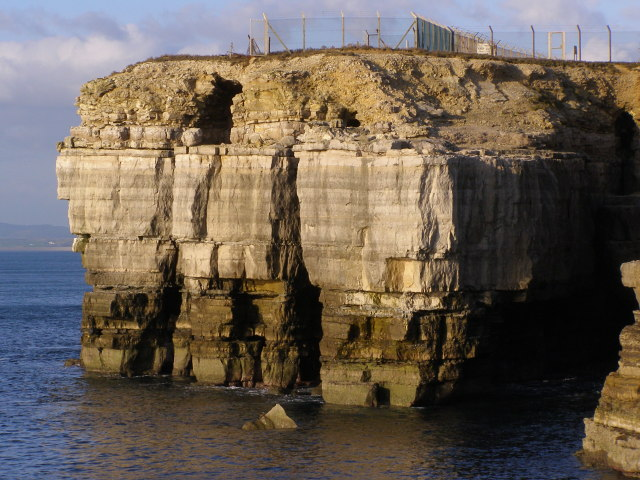
Raised beach deposits at White Hole, Portland

During the last 2,600,000 years, Britain was subjected to a number of extreme fluctuations in temperature, which included three ice ages. Dorset was not affected by glaciation, but did experience very low temperatures with permafrost on the high ground. Sudden changes in sea level, and successive warming and cooling, significantly modified the landscape. The two raised beaches at Portland, created 210,000 and 125,000 years ago, are a dramatic testament to the fluctuations in sea levels. The causes of these two fluctuations were twofold – the growth of the ice sheets, which locked away large quantities of water, and the weight of the ice in the north that caused the landmass to tilt.

During the summers, partial melting of the ice created large rivers that washed enormous amounts of sand and gravel across Dorset, forming huge terraces in both the upland areas and valleys. These rivers cut down into the landscape as they made their way to the lower sea levels. This action caused many large-scale landslips, most notably around Shaftesbury and Abbotsbury.

Landslips caused by marine erosion still occur today, with some of the largest taking place along the West Dorset Coast. Fossilised remains, including the teeth and tusks of elephants and mammoths dating back 500,000 years, are often exposed. Flint and chert tools from early human visitors have been retrieved from the river terraces around the Dorset and Devon border, although these may have been transported here with the other river deposits. Chesil Bank, a 29 kilometres (18 mi) long barrier beach stretching from West Bay to Portland, was created 10,000 years ago, when sea levels rose at the end of the last ice age.

== Structure ==
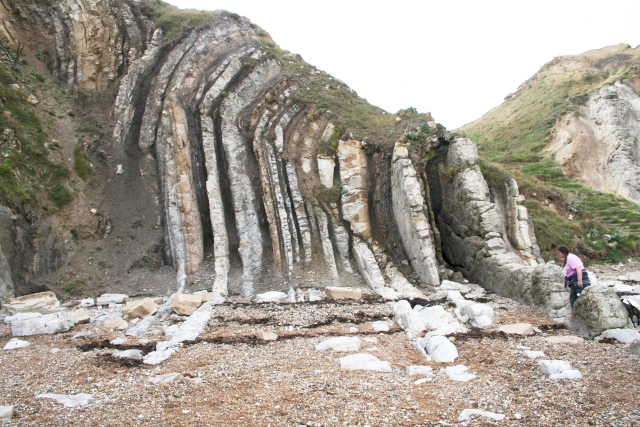
Vertical rock strata on the west side of St Oswald's Bay, at the western end of the Purbeck Monocline

=== Structural development ===
The Variscan orogeny is the oldest event for which evidence is found in Dorset, forming a major series of thrust faults in Carboniferous and older rocks. These thrusts trend west–east, dip moderately towards the south, and have controlled later basin development and subsequent phases of inversion. During the Permo-Triassic, the area was affected by a phase of rifting that reactivated the older thrusts in extension. These extensional faults were themselves reactivated during further rifting in Jurassic to early Cretaceous times. The area experienced the effects of the early stages of Alpine collision during the Late Cretaceous to Palaeogene, with reverse reactivation of many of the extensional faults, creating the most visible of the structures in the Dorset area, such as the Purbeck Monocline.

=== Litton Cheney Fault ===
The Litton Cheney Fault is a west–to-east-trending, south-dipping normal fault. The fault was active during deposition of the Lias Group and again during the late Jurassic to early Cretaceous. Some evidence exists of minor reversal on the fault during the late Cretaceous to Palaeogene inversion.

=== Abbotsbury–Ridgeway Fault ===
This major west–to-east-trending, south-dipping normal fault was mainly active during the late Jurassic to early Cretaceous, as shown by the local preservation of the Wealden in its hanging wall. It was reactivated as a reverse fault during the late Cretaceous to Palaeogene, and now juxtaposes Portland and Purbeck beds in the hanging wall against chalk in the footwall. The fault is not directly linked to faults beneath the Triassic salt layer.

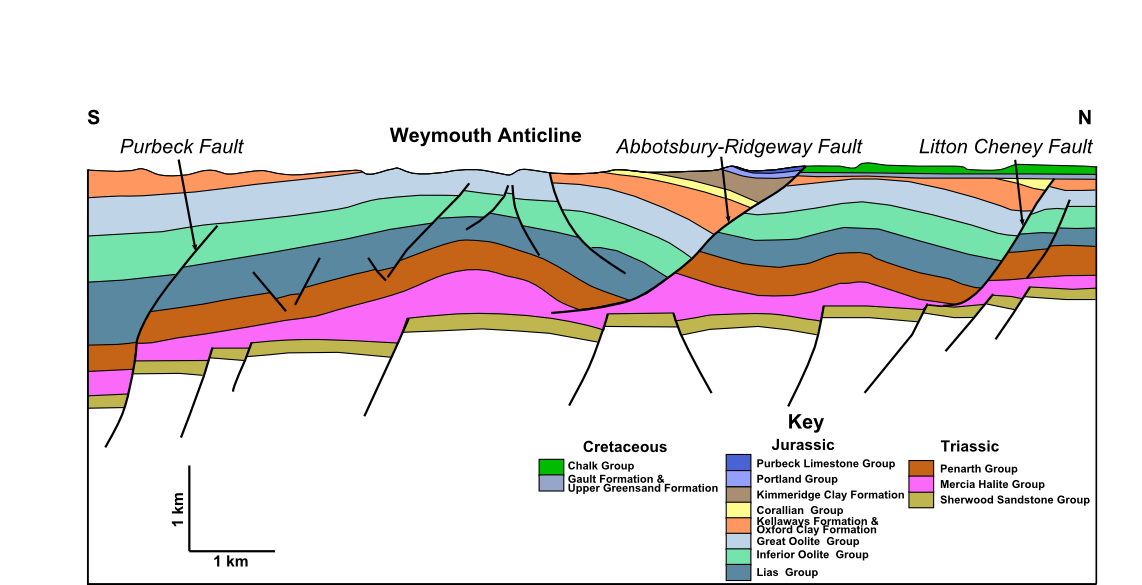
Cross-section over the Weymouth Anticline

=== Weymouth Anticline ===
The Weymouth Anticline has a west–to-east-trending axis and plunges to the east. Strata beneath the Upper Triassic halite are unfolded, indicating that the salt is acting as a decollement. The anticline is a result of inversion along the Abbotsbury–Ridgeway Fault, although it may have developed by the tightening of an earlier rollover anticline, formed during an earlier extensional phase, due to the soft-linked nature of the faulting.

=== Purbeck Monocline ===
This monoclinal structure forms part of a semicontinuous structure extending eastwards through the Isle of Wight as the Portland-Wight Monocline (or Disturbance). This was formed by reverse reactivation of the Purbeck–Isle of Wight fault zone.

== See also ==
- Mary Anning – English fossil collector and palaeontologist (1799–1847)

== Bibliography ==
- Chaffey, John (2004). The Dorset Landscape, Its Scenery and Geology. Tiverton, Devon: Dorset Books. ISBN 1-871164-43-5.
- G. M., Davies (1964). The Dorset Coast. London: Adam and Charles Black.
- Paul, Ensom (1998). Discover Dorset: Geology. Wimborne: Dovecote Press. ISBN 1 874336 52 0.
- House, Michael R. (1993). Geology of the Dorset Coast. Gower Street, London.: The Geologists' Association. ISBN 0-900717-58-0.
