= Worbarrow Bay =

Bay in Dorset, England

Coordinates: 50°37′N 2°12′W

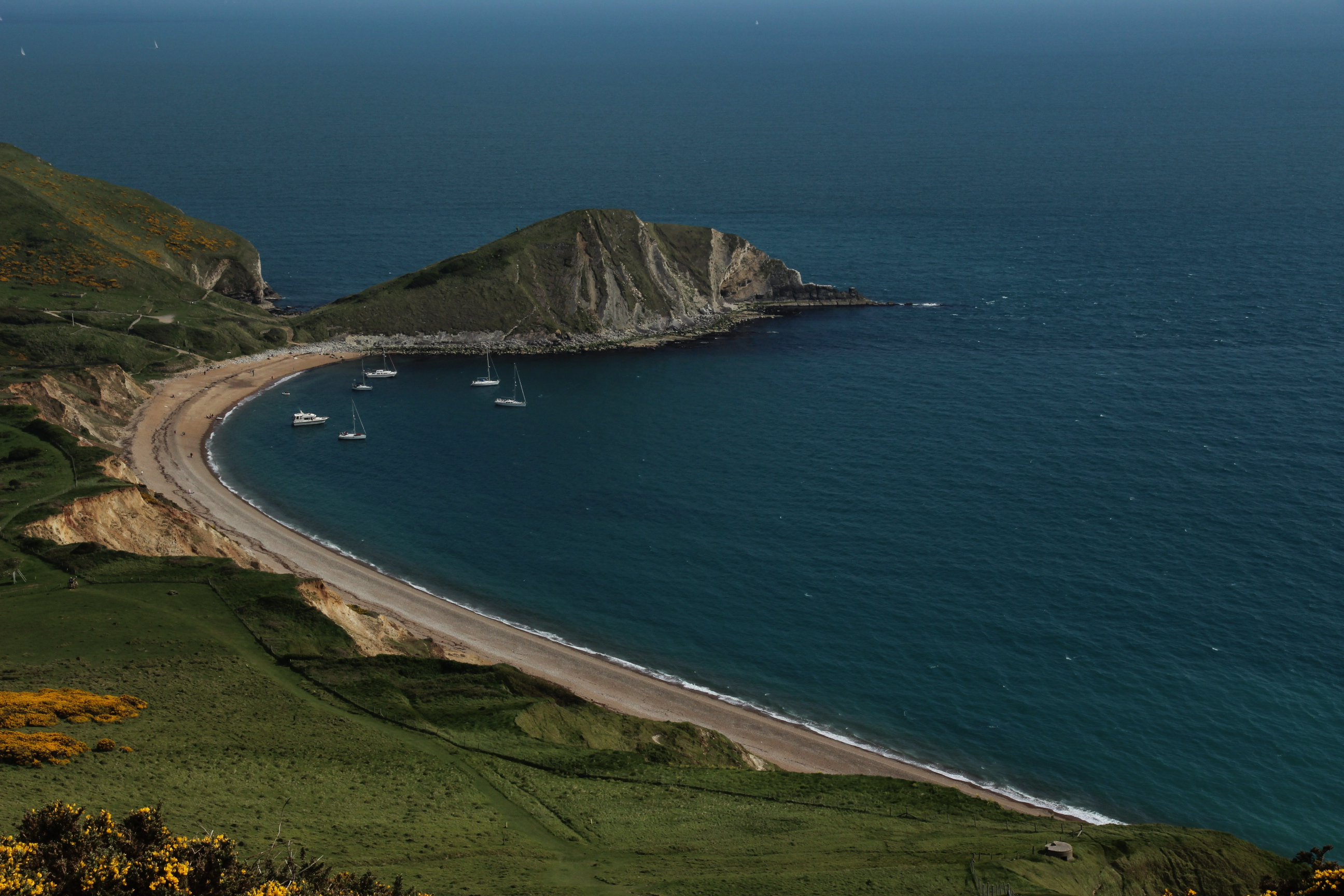
Worbarrow Bay seen from Flower's Barrow, with the headland of Worbarrow Tout in the background

Worbarrow Bay is a large broad and shallow bay just to the east of Lulworth Cove on the Isle of Purbeck, Dorset, England.

== Location ==
Worbarrow Bay is located about six kilometres south of Wareham and about 16 kilometres west of Swanage. At the eastern end of the Bay is a promontory known as Worbarrow Tout. The northwest end of the bay is known as Cow Corner. Towering over Worbarrow Bay to the north is Flower's Barrow ridge, which due to coastal erosion is gradually falling into the sea. Flower’s Barrow forms the western end of the ridge which runs all the way to Ballard Point, north of Swanage.

Worbarrow Bay is only accessible when the Lulworth Ranges are open to the public. It can be reached by a 1.4-kilometre (0.9 mi) walk down an easy track alongside Tyneham Gwyle, from the car park alongside the ghost village of Tyneham. The residents of Worbarrow were required to leave their homes in 1943, including the Miller family who had lived at Worbarrow for many generations. Little evidence now remains of the eight cottages and coastguard station (disbanded in 1910) that once stood close to the bay.

== Geology ==
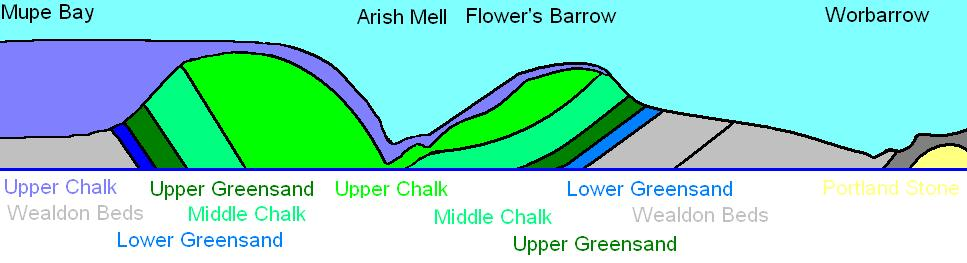
Geology of the coastline from Mupe Bay to Worbarrow Bay

The geology of Worbarrow Bay and Mupe Bay are very similar and they almost mirror each other. The plane of the "mirror" bisects the point where the two bays meet, the Arish Mell gap.

The cliffs behind Worbarrow Bay expose a sequence of Cretaceous rocks. These range from the chalks at the northwest end of the bay, at Cow Corner, that are between 85 and 145 million years old, through to the hard stone outcrop in the east. The sediments that form the peninsula are Portland limestones, which is 150 million years old, and the Purbeck Beds, 147 million years old.

The cliffs and the tout have distinctive angular layers of rock that visibly demonstrate the complex sedimentary folding that affected this area some 30 million years ago. The foldings were caused by tectonic pressures as the African and European continents collided. At that time the cliff sediments were twisted horizontally and that is why the younger chalks are found towards the rear of the bay and the older sediments face the sea at the front of the bay.

== Fossil zones ==
The localities along the Jurassic Coast include a large range of important fossil zones. The Purbeck lagoonal limestones and the shales that are exposed in the cliffs of Worbarrow Tout contain dinosaur footprints and have abundant brackish water bivalves, gastropods and ostracods.

== In popular culture ==
The 1928 short story "Wailing Well" by M. R. James takes place at Worbarrow Bay.

== Gallery ==
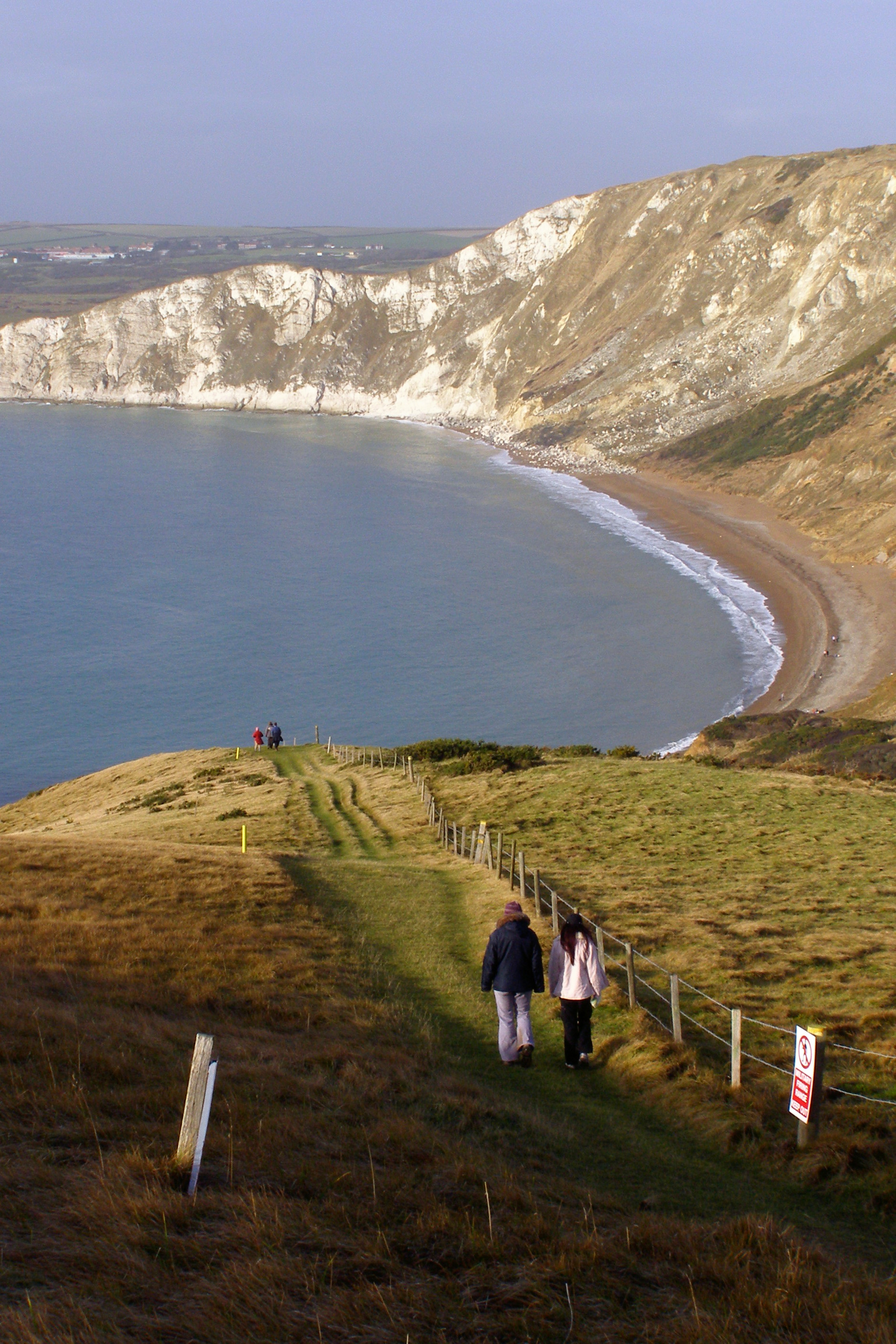
Worbarrow Bay from Gold Down

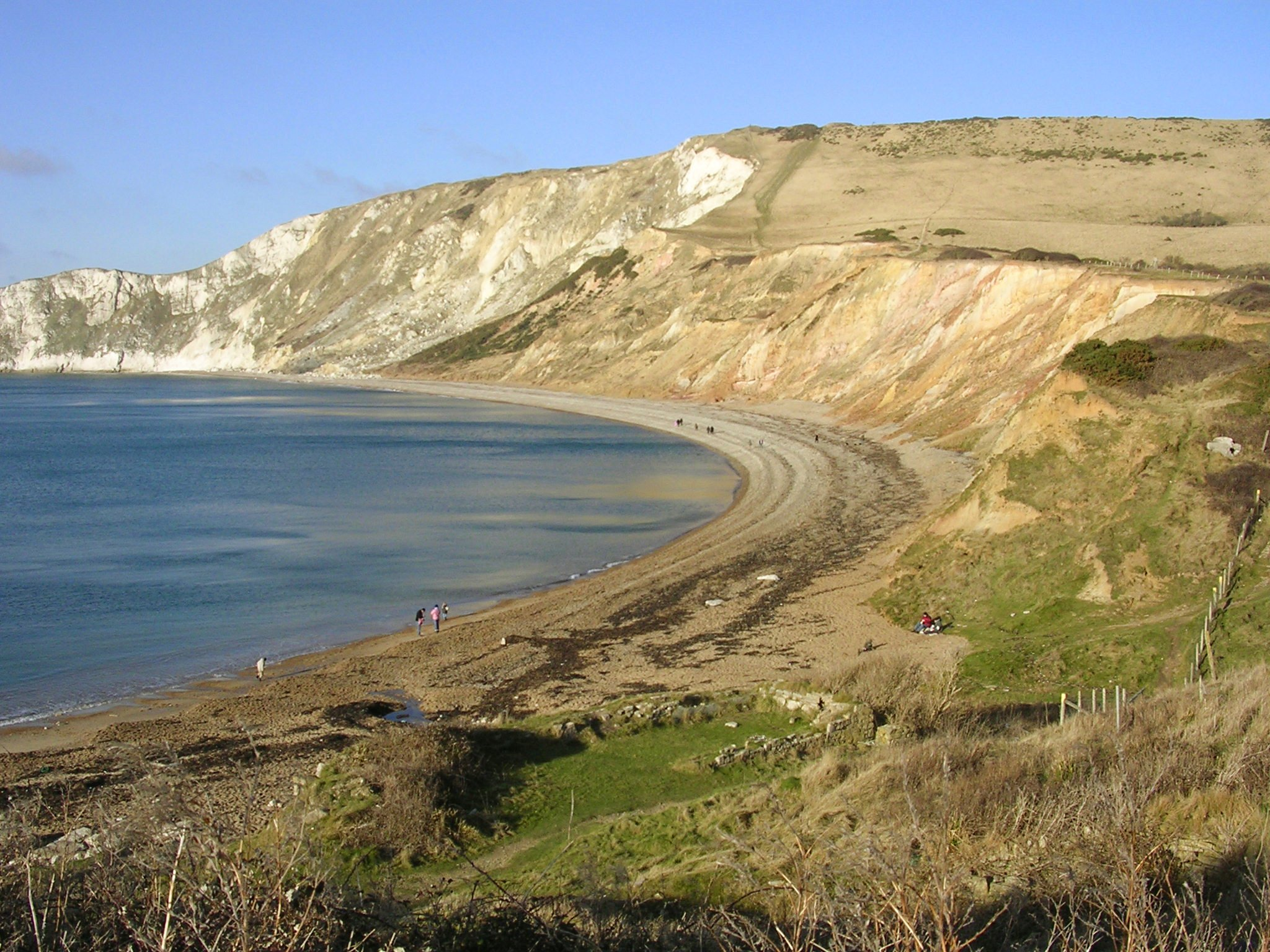
Worbarrow Bay from the end of Tyneham Gwyle

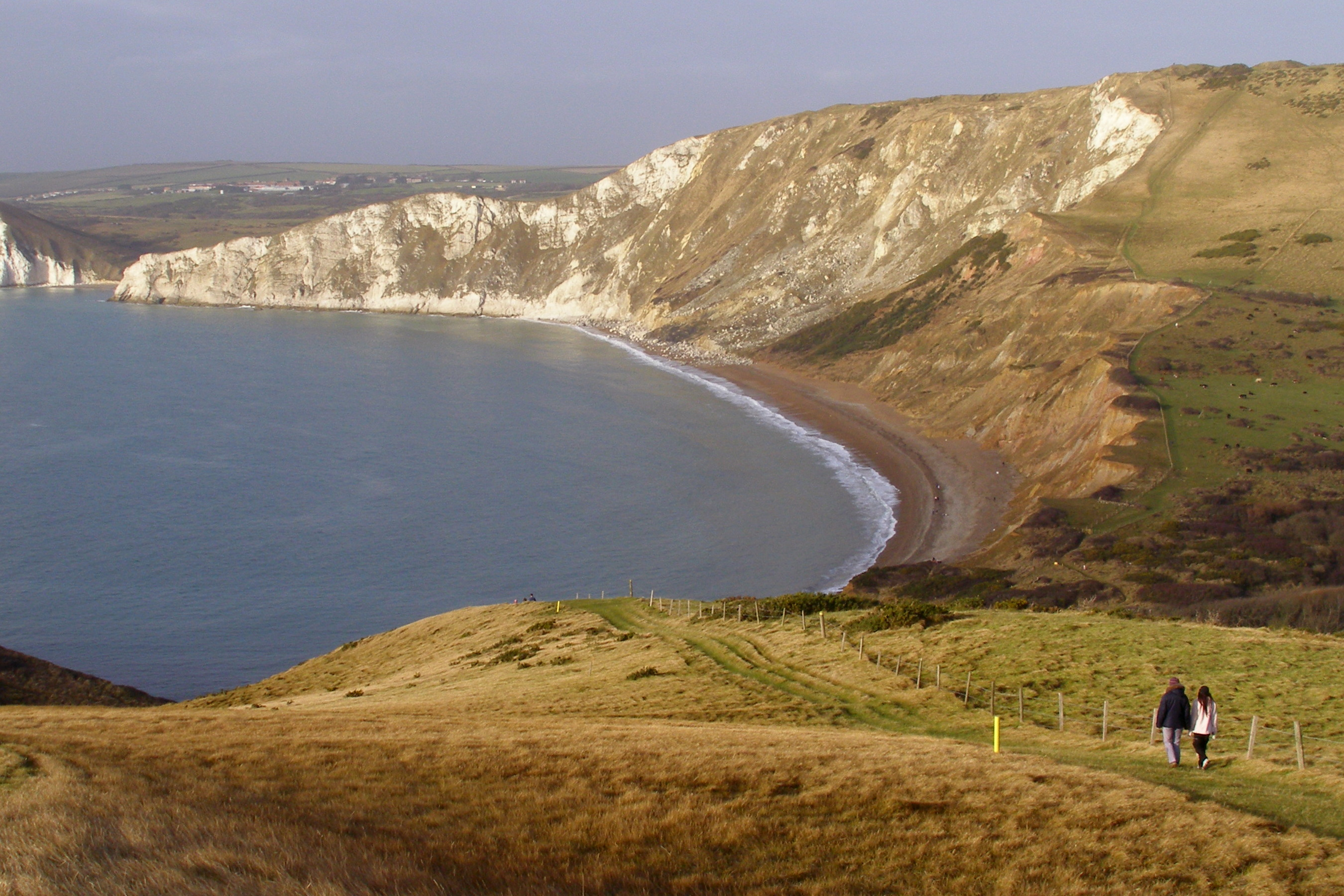
Worbarrow Bay from Gold Down
