= Flower's Barrow =

Iron Age hillfort in Dorset, England

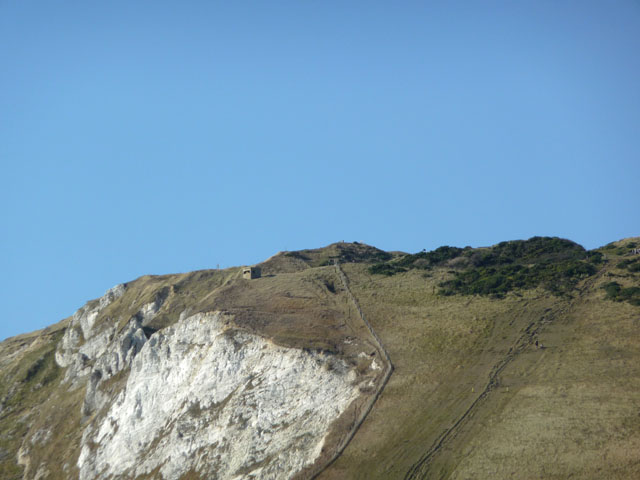
- Flower's Barrow from Worbarrow Bay
- Interactive map of Flower's Barrow
- 50°37′26″N 2°11′38″W
- Type: Hillfort
- Periods: Iron Age
- Location: Worbarrow Bay, Dorset, England
- Region: Isle of Purbeck
- Nearest city: Wareham
- Part of: Jurassic Coast
- OS grid reference: SY8638080560

History
- Formed: Iron Age
- Original use: Hillfort

Site notes
- Current use: Disused
- Owner: Ministry of Defence
- Public access: Pedestrian access when Lulworth Ranges are open

Flower's Barrow is an Iron Age hillfort, built over 2,500 years ago on Rings Hill, above Worbarrow Bay in Dorset on the south coast of England. It is located about 11 miles (18 km) west of Swanage and about 6.25 miles (10 km) southwest of Wareham. It is within the Jurassic Coast World Heritage Site and the Dorset National Landscape area.

Towering to the north over Worbarrow Bay is Flower's Barrow ridge, part of the Purbeck Hills, a chalk ridge which runs east to Ballard Point north of Swanage. The ancient hillfort of Flower's Barrow rises behind the beach at Arish Mell. The hill lies directly west of the ghost village of Tyneham. Flower's Barrow has a limited future because the southern part is falling into the sea at Worbarrow Bay due to coastal erosion. Probably more than half of it has already disappeared.

== Military use and access ==
Access to Flower's Barrow hillfort is solely possible on foot, either from Tyneham village, with a steep uphill walk, or alternatively from the viewing point and car park at Whiteway Hill, walking along the hill to the west. Flower's Barrow is only accessible when the Lulworth Ranges are open to the public. The ranges are owned by the Ministry of Defence and are part of the Armoured Fighting Vehicles Gunnery School. The more than 2,830-hectare (7,000-acre) ranges stretch along the coastline between Lulworth Cove to just west of Kimmeridge. Safety warnings about explosives and unexploded shells are posted around the site by the MoD, and visitors are advised to keep to official footpaths and abide by local site notices, because tanks and armoured vehicles are used in this area.

== Hillfort ==
This early Iron Age hillfort, taken over by the Romans when they invaded, has double and triple ramparts. The parallel double ramparts on the east and west flanks are connected along the northern border and are unmistakably visible. Because the cliff face acted as defence, probably, there were never ramparts along the southern end.

Several sections of the interior of the hillfort have been exposed following coastal erosion. Hut circles are visible within the interior of the fort. During a minor excavation in 1939, fragments of Iron Age pottery, as well as sling-stones and bones, were found in a pit near the western entrance. Subsequent landslides have revealed the floor of the hillfort. The continual ground disturbances at the southern fringe increase the possibility of further archaeological finds. However, the twin hazards of cliff erosion and the possibility of unexploded military shells from the Lulworth Ranges command extreme caution. Visitors are warned to keep to the footpaths and between the yellow MoD markers.

The site is a Scheduled Monument on the National Heritage List for England (no. 1008141), listed in 1932.

== Geology ==
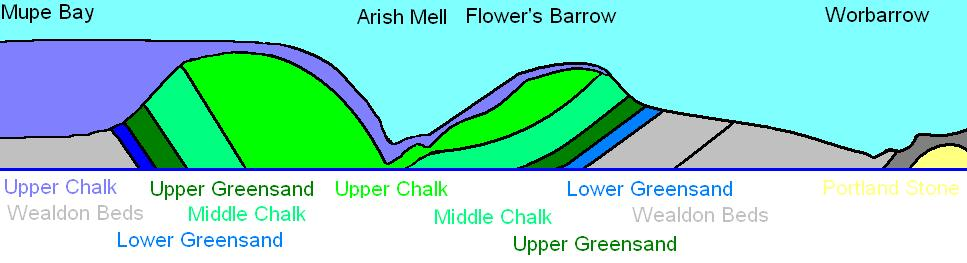
Geology of the coastline by Flower's Barrow and Arish Mell

The steep angular layers of rock, which are clearly visible in the bay, reveal the complex sedimentary folding that disturbed the geology in this vicinity. These folds were caused by tectonic pressures some 30 million years ago as the African and European continents collided. At this time the cliff sediments were twisted horizontally, and this is why the Chalks that are between 85 and 145 million years old are found at the rear of the bay. The sediments that form Mupe Ledges, the Mupe Rocks and the peninsula Worbarrow Tout are 150-million-year-old Portland Limestone and 147-million-year-old Purbeck Beds.

== Bibliography ==
- The Jurassic Coast Trust (2003). A Walk Through Time, the Official Guide to the Jurassic Coast. Coastal Publishing. ISBN 978-0-9544845-0-7.
