= Nuts in May (Play for Today) =

- Play for Today episode
- Roger Sloman and Alison Steadman
- Episode no.: Series 6 Episode 12
- Directed by: Mike Leigh
- Written by: Mike Leigh
- Original air date: 13 January 1976

Episode chronology
← Previous "The Other Woman"	Next → "Doran's Box"

"Nuts in May" is the 12th episode of the sixth season of the British BBC anthology TV series Play for Today. The episode was a television play that was originally broadcast on 13 January 1976. "Nuts in May" was written and directed by Mike Leigh, produced by David Rose, and stars Roger Sloman and Alison Steadman.

"Nuts in May" is the tragicomical story of a nature-loving and rather self-righteous couple's exhausting battle to enjoy what they perceive to be an idyllic camping holiday. Misunderstandings and awkward clashes of values occur, and an explosive conflict when a less high-minded guest pitches his tent nearby.

== Plot ==
Childlike Candice-Marie Pratt and eccentric-obsessive Keith Pratt arrive at a campsite in Dorset and pitch their tent in a quiet spot suitable for appreciating nature's wonders while keeping other human beings safely at arm's length. The couple take day trips to Corfe Castle, a quarry, and a local farm to purchase some unpasteurised milk. Their usual routine (which includes performing their own guitar-banjo compositions, preparing healthy vegetarian dinners and following the Country Code) is rudely interrupted by Ray, a lone student and trainee PE teacher who camps nearby and switches on his radio: this is treated by the couple as an unforgivable crime, and they try to force Ray to turn it off. Later, on the way home after a trip to Stair Hole, it begins to rain and the couple notice a figure (which turns out to be Ray) walking along the road and give him a lift home.

Their relationship becomes increasingly tense and tempers flare when Keith notices Candice Marie exhibiting an unseemly interest in Ray – "she crawls into his tent to show him stones she has collected on the beach; Keith explodes with jealous rage after spying on them from behind the bushes with his binoculars, like a character in a farce." Later, Ray is asked to take a photograph of the couple but is patronised by Keith and Candice Marie and is forced to participate in a song at Keith's behest. As soon as some kind of order seems to have been restored, Brummie couple Finger and Honky arrive on their motorbike, equipped with an army tent, a football and a fondness for late-night drinking. Befriending Ray, who has more in common with their personalities than Keith and Candice Marie, they all get drunk at the local pub. After arriving back at the campsite and continuing to make a large amount of noise, Honky and Finger raise the ire of Keith who shouts at them to be quiet. The next day, Keith and Candice Marie have an intense argument with Finger and Honky over Finger's plans to light an open fire to cook some sausages. Keith highly objects to this, as it contravenes the rules of the site and the country code, so resorts to physical threats to stop it, chasing Finger around the campsite with a large branch. Eventually running out of energy, Keith bursts into tears and runs off into the woods. When he returns some time later, Keith decides that he and Candice Marie will leave the campsite but is unable to get a refund from Miss Beale, the site's owner.

While searching for a new campsite (or "a bed and breakfast if the worst came to the worst," says Keith), a police car pulls up behind them. Keith provides the policeman with his documents, but is humiliated when the officer points out that the Morris Minor's spare tyre is bald, an offence.

Finally finding peace, Keith and Candice Marie pitch their tent in the field of a nearby farm. Having marvelled at how the wind plucks the strings of their guitar, Keith heads off looking for a suitable spot to go to the toilet and Candice Marie sings along to another composition of hers on guitar. Meanwhile, it is revealed they are seemingly oblivious to the battery farming of chickens and mechanical cow milking practised on the farm.

== Cast ==
- Alison Steadman as Candice Marie
- Roger Sloman as Keith
- Anthony O'Donnell as Ray
- Sheila Kelley as Honky
- Stephen Bill as Finger
- Richenda Carey as Miss Beale
- Eric Allan as Quarryman
- Sally Watts as Farm-Girl
- Matthew Guinness as Farmer
- Richard Ireson as Policeman

Sheila Kelley and Stephen Bill were a couple in real life at the time.

== Filming ==
The play was filmed during the summer of 1975 in June and July in Dorset for a winter release in mid January 1976.

== Locations ==
The episode is set, and was filmed in its entirety, in the geologically and historically rich Isle of Purbeck area of Dorset in South West England. The characters visit a number of significant points of interest including Corfe Castle, Stair Hole, Kimmeridge, Lulworth Cove and the Jurassic Coast, a World Heritage Site. The location was chosen at the suggestion of the producer David Rose, who came from Purbeck: "I told him about the quarries in the district and asked him to film everything out of doors, under the skies; he reneged only slightly on this condition – there is one sequence of about one minute twenty seconds, in the Greyhound pub near Corfe Castle, and one short scene in a toilet. Apart from that, the only interiors are those of some very small tents." The campsite used for filming was Corfe Castle Campsite, just outside Corfe Castle, which is still used as a campsite. The quarry visited is Keates Quarry in Acton.

== Reputation ==
"Nuts in May" was ranked 49th in the British Film Institute's list of the 100 Greatest British Television Programmes. Vic Reeves and Bob Mortimer chose the film to end At Home with Vic and Bob (1993), which was an evening of programmes scheduled by the duo.
