= Fossil Forest, Dorset =

Petrified forest in Dorset, England

Coordinates: 50.6163°N 2.2408°W

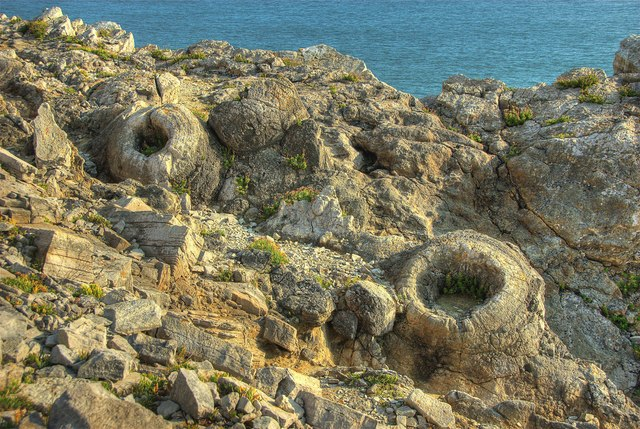
On this ledge are some ring-shaped structures up to 2 metres across. These are moulds of gymnosperms (early coniferous trees) which died after being encased in sediment. Most of the trees were upright leaving round holes, but some had fallen leaving elongate coffin-shaped moulds.

The Fossil Forest is the remains of an ancient submerged forest from Jurassic times, located to the east of Lulworth Cove on the Isle of Purbeck in Dorset, England. It lies on the Jurassic Coast, on a wide ledge in the seaside cliff. The site is within the Lulworth Ranges and thus has restricted access. Parts of forest can also be seen on the Isle of Portland and in quarries near the town of Weymouth to the west.

== History ==
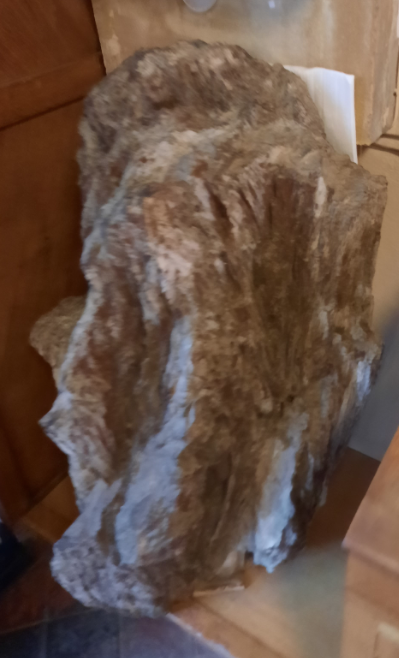
Protocupressinoxylon from the Fossil Forest

Near the end of the Jurassic period (c.144 million years ago) the sea levels dropped and a number of islands emerged in the Purbeck area, surrounded by saline lagoons and channels. For a short period, soil formed and a tropical forest grew up. It then flooded under a shallow saline lagoon. The remains are now preserved as the Fossil Forest. This provides the most complete fossilised record of a Jurassic forest in the world.

The c. 140-million-year-old Gymnosperm trees bear similarities with modern-day Cypress (Cupressus), with foliage having the characteristics of a 'Monkey Puzzle' (Araucaria araucana). Because of its closeness to Cupressus, the species found here at the fossilized forest has been named Protocupressinoxylon purbeckensis (i.e. 'Early cypress-wood from the Purbecks'). Dendrochronology indicates that they grew in a Mediterranean climate. Some of tree stumps show the remains of thrombolites.

Purbeckensis is fairly easily distinguished from other species of prehistoric tree, due to the timbers' characteristic "cross-field pitting". Algal stromatolites can be observed upon some of the stumps.

The Fossil Forest at Dorset has been described as "one of the most complete fossilized forest of any age".

== See also ==
- Fossil Grove, Glasgow, Scotland
- Gilboa Fossil Forest, New York, USA

== Bibliography ==
- The Jurassic Coast Trust (2003). A Walk Through Time, the Official Guide to the Jurassic Coast. Coastal Publishing. ISBN 978-0-9544845-0-7.
