= Bindon Hill =

Prehistoric hill fort in Dorset, England

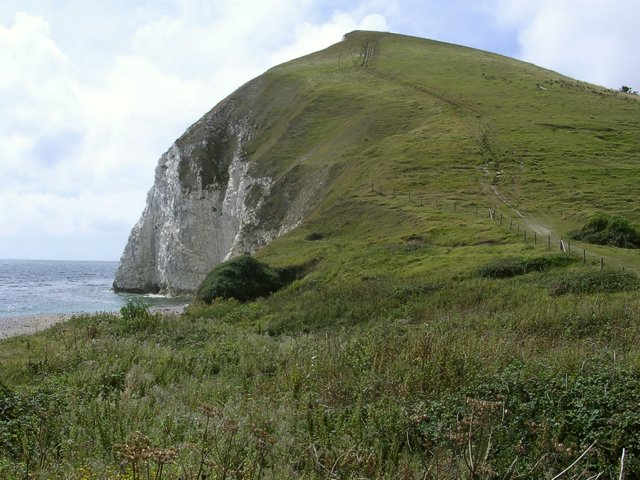
- East end of Bindon Hill from Arish Mell gap

Highest point
- Elevation: 168 m (551 ft)
- Prominence: 94 m (308 ft)
- Parent peak: Lewesdon Hill
- Listing: sub-HuMP
- Coordinates: 50.62217°N 2.23461°W

Geography
- Location: Dorset, England
- Parent range: Purbeck Hills
- OS grid: SY839802
- Topo map: OS Landranger 194

Map showing the location of Bindon Hill within Dorset.

Bindon Hill is an extensive Iron Age earthwork, enclosing a coastal hill area on the Jurassic Coast near Lulworth Cove in Dorset, England. It is about 19 kilometres (12 mi) west of Swanage, about 6 kilometres (3.7 mi) south west of Wareham, and about 17 kilometres (11 mi) southeast of Dorchester. It is within an Area of Outstanding Natural Beauty on the Jurassic Coast.

== Hill fort ==
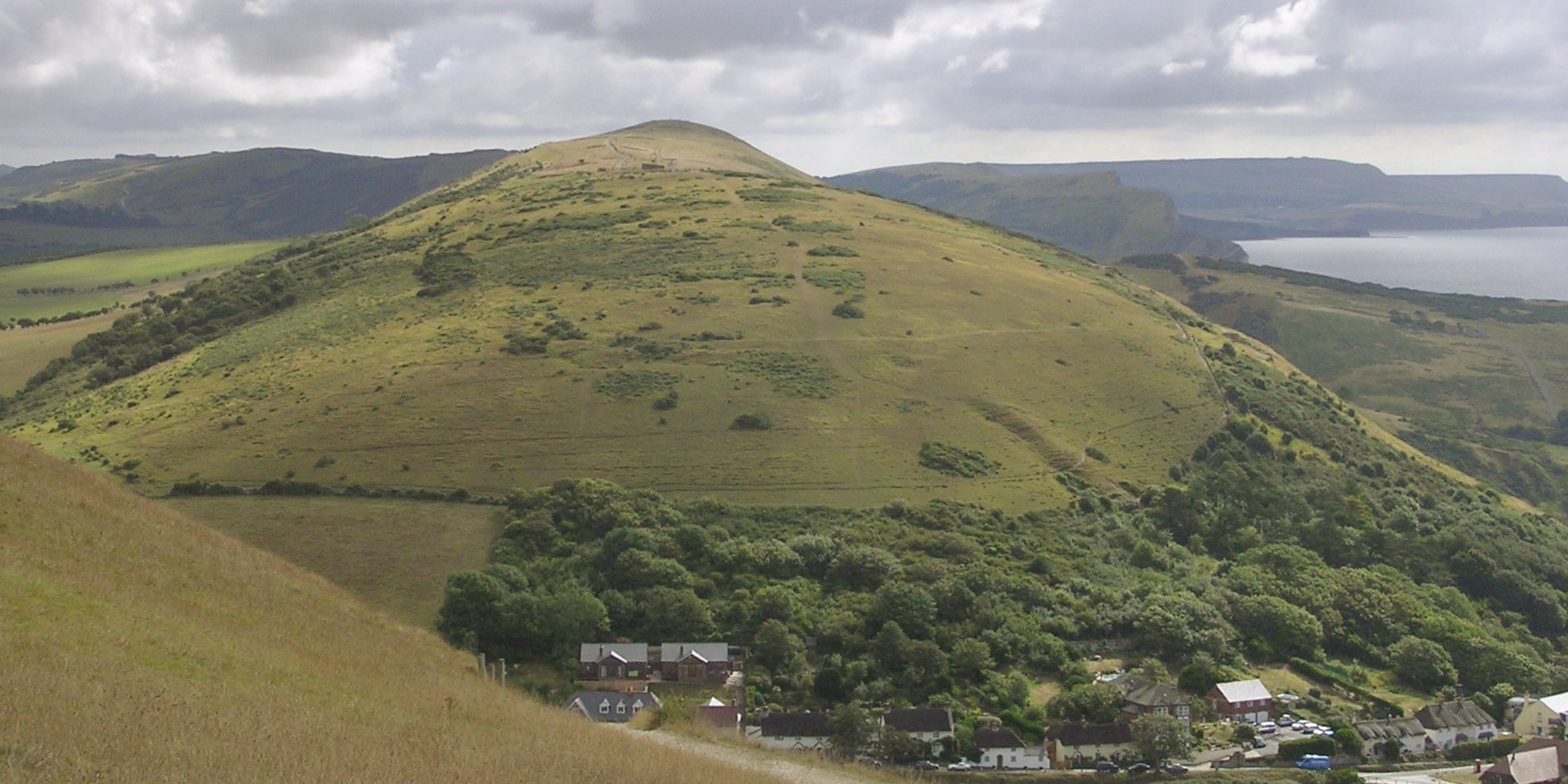
The western end of Bindon Hill, above Lulworth Cove

The main rampart and external ditch (univallate) run for over 2 km along an east-west ridge parallel to the coast, which lies about 750 m to the south. The ridge rises to 168 m and the cliffs are 30–120 m high. At the western end, an incomplete series of ramparts curves back to the cliffs of Lulworth Cove. At the eastern end, the main rampart reaches the cliffs on the north side of Mupe Bay. The total enclosed area is about 110 ha.

The enormous enclosed area, lack of evidence of settlement in the interior, and the impossibility of effectively defending such a large perimeter, all suggest it was primarily an enclosed pasture for domesticated animals, not a strategic tribal hill fort.

The area includes a Romano-British villa, which is a Scheduled Monument (no. 1002705), listed in 1924.

== Accessibility ==
The Eastern half of Bindon Hill is only accessible when the Lulworth Ranges are open to the public. It can be reached by a short walk from West Lulworth, or alternatively via the South West Coast Path from Lulworth Cove. The ranges are owned by the Ministry of Defence (MoD) and are part of the Armoured Fighting Vehicles (AFV) Gunnery School. The ranges are more than 2,830 hectares (7,000 acres). Visitors are advised to keep to official footpaths and abide by local site notices, because tanks and Armoured vehicles are used in this area. Safety warnings about explosives and unexploded shells are posted nearby by the MoD, and there is a flashing warning lamp situated on the hill, which is illuminated when the ranges are in use.

When the ranges are open, the area is suitable for walks, lying on the South West Coast Path, for example starting from West Lulworth or Lulworth Cove, and including the Fossil Forest on the coast. The hill is about 380 feet high.

== Bibliography ==
- The Jurassic Coast Trust (2003). A Walk Through Time, the Official Guide to the Jurassic Coast. Coastal Publishing. ISBN 978-0-9544845-0-7.
- Cunliffe, Barry (1974). Iron Age Communities in Britain. ISBN 978-0-7100-8725-6.
