= Matthew Guinness =

British actor (born 1940)

- Born: 6 June 1940 (age 85); London, England
- Spouses: Andrée Lefevre (m. 1967; div. 1985) Helen Lynch (m. 1989; div. 1993) Joanne Bristow (m. 1996)
- Children: 3
- Father: Alec Guinness
- Relatives: Nesta Guinness-Walker (grandson)

Matthew Guinness (born 6 June 1940) is an English actor. He gave a sensitive portrayal of cerebral palsy–afflicted Mr. Johnny in the 1974 BBC adaptation of Carrie's War. He played the part of the Farmer in the 1976 film Nuts in May, appears in Ridley Scott's The Duellists (1977) and had a small role in 1986's Lady Jane. He has also worked extensively in theatre.

== Life ==
Guinness was born on 6 June 1940 at Denmark Hill Hospital in London, the only child of Alec Guinness (1914–2000) and Merula Salaman (1914–2000); his father was appearing on stage in The Tempest at the Old Vic at the time.

According to his father, Guinness was afflicted with polio early in his life, although he later made a full recovery. Corin Redgrave, who knew Guinness from childhood, claimed that he was very strictly brought up. As a child, he appeared with his father in The Card.

Guinness has been married three times. His first marriage was to Andrée Lefevre, from 1967 to 1985, with whom he has a son, and a daughter Sally, who made a cameo as a Supreme Council member in the 2019 film Star Wars: The Rise of Skywalker. His second marriage was to Helen Lynch, from 1989 to 1993. He has been married to Joanne Bristow since 1996, and they have one daughter.

Guinness's grandson, Nesta Guinness-Walker, is a professional footballer.
