= Isle of Purbeck =

Peninsula in Dorset, England

Coordinates: 50.6376°N 2.0579°W

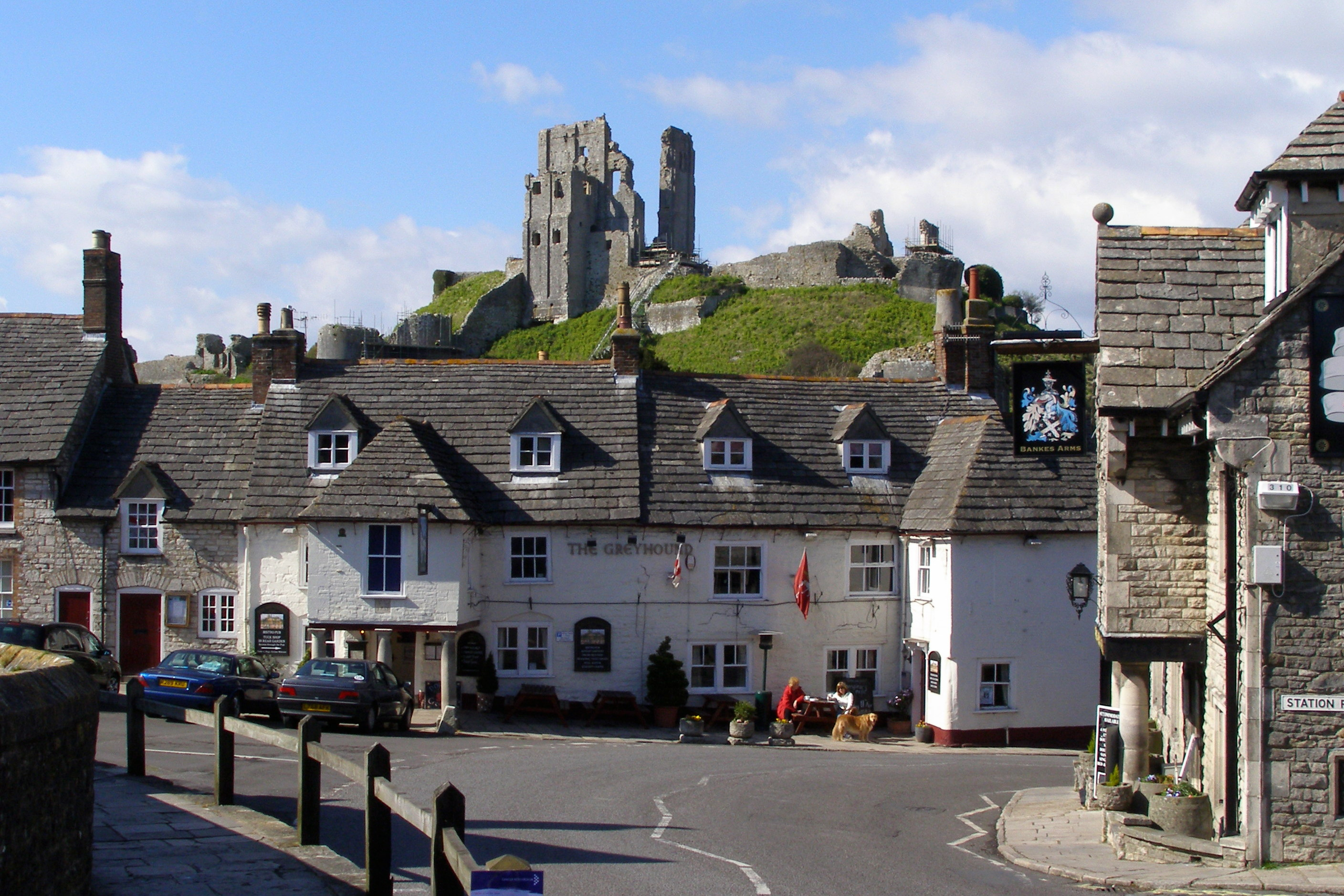
Corfe Castle

The Isle of Purbeck is a peninsula in Dorset, England. It is bordered by the English Channel to the south and east, where cliffs fall to the sea, and by the marshy lands of the River Frome and Poole Harbour to the north. Its western boundary is less well defined, with some medieval sources placing it at Flower's Barrow above Worbarrow Bay. John Hutchins, author of The History and Antiquities of the County of Dorset, defined Purbeck's western boundary as the Luckford Lake stream, which runs south from the Frome. According to writer and broadcaster Ralph Wightman, Purbeck "is only an island if you accept the barren heaths between Arish Mell and Wareham as cutting off this corner of Dorset as effectively as the sea." The most southerly point is St Alban's Head (archaically St. Aldhelm's Head).

From 1974 to 2019, the whole of the Isle of Purbeck lay within the local government district of Purbeck, which was named after it. The district extended significantly further north and west than the traditional boundary of the Isle of Purbeck along the River Frome. Following the abolition of the district on 1 April 2019, the Isle now lies within the Dorset unitary authority area.

In terms of natural landscape areas, the southern part of the Isle of Purbeck and the coastal strip as far as Ringstead Bay in the west have been designated as National Character Area 136 – South Purbeck by Natural England. To the north are the Dorset Heaths and to the west, the Weymouth Lowlands.

== Geology ==
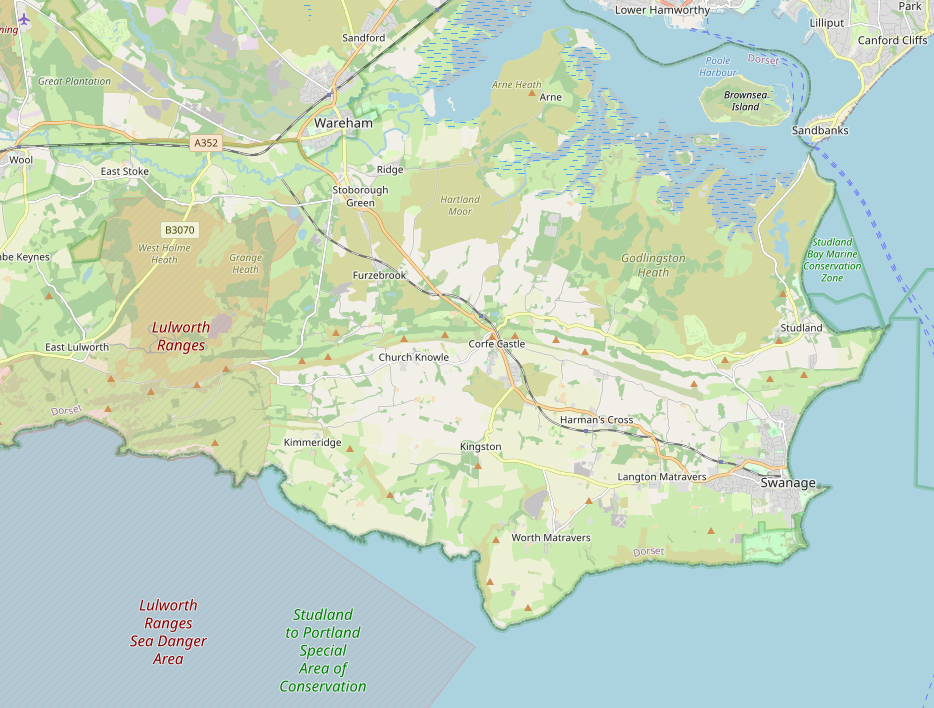
Map of the Isle of Purbeck

The geology of the Isle is complex. It has a discordant coastline along the east and concordant coastline along the south. The northern part is Eocene clay (Barton Beds), including significant deposits of Purbeck Ball Clay. Where the land rises to the sea, there are several parallel strata of Jurassic rocks, including Portland limestone and the Purbeck beds. The latter include Purbeck Marble, a particularly hard limestone that can be polished (though mineralogically, it is not marble). A ridge of Cretaceous chalk runs along the peninsula creating the Purbeck Hills, part of the Southern England Chalk Formation that includes Salisbury Plain, the Dorset Downs and the Isle of Wight. The cliffs here are some of the most spectacular in England, and of great geological interest, both for the rock types and variety of landforms, notably Lulworth Cove and Durdle Door, and the coast is part of the Jurassic Coast World Heritage Site because of the unique geology.

In the past, quarrying of limestone was particularly concentrated around the western side of Swanage, the villages of Worth Matravers and Langton Matravers, and the cliffs along the coast between Swanage and St. Aldhelm's Head. The "caves" at Tilly Whim are former quarries, and Dancing Ledge, Seacombe and Winspit are other cliff-edge quarries. Stone was removed from the cliff quarries either by sea or using horse carts to transport large blocks to Swanage. Many of England's most famous cathedrals are adorned with Purbeck marble, and much of London was rebuilt in Portland and Purbeck stone after the Great Fire of London.

By contrast, the principal ball clay workings were in the area between Corfe Castle and Wareham. Originally the clay was taken by pack horse to wharves on the River Frome and the south side of Poole Harbour. However, in the first half of the 19th century the pack horses were replaced by horse-drawn tramways. With the coming of the railway from Wareham to Swanage, most ball clay was dispatched by rail, often to the Potteries district of Staffordshire.

Quarrying still takes place on Purbeck, with both Purbeck Ball Clay and limestones being transported from the area by road. There are now no functioning quarries of Purbeck Marble. The Purbeck Mineral and Mining Museum exhibits ball clays, mining, and the associated narrow-gauge railways.

== Flora ==
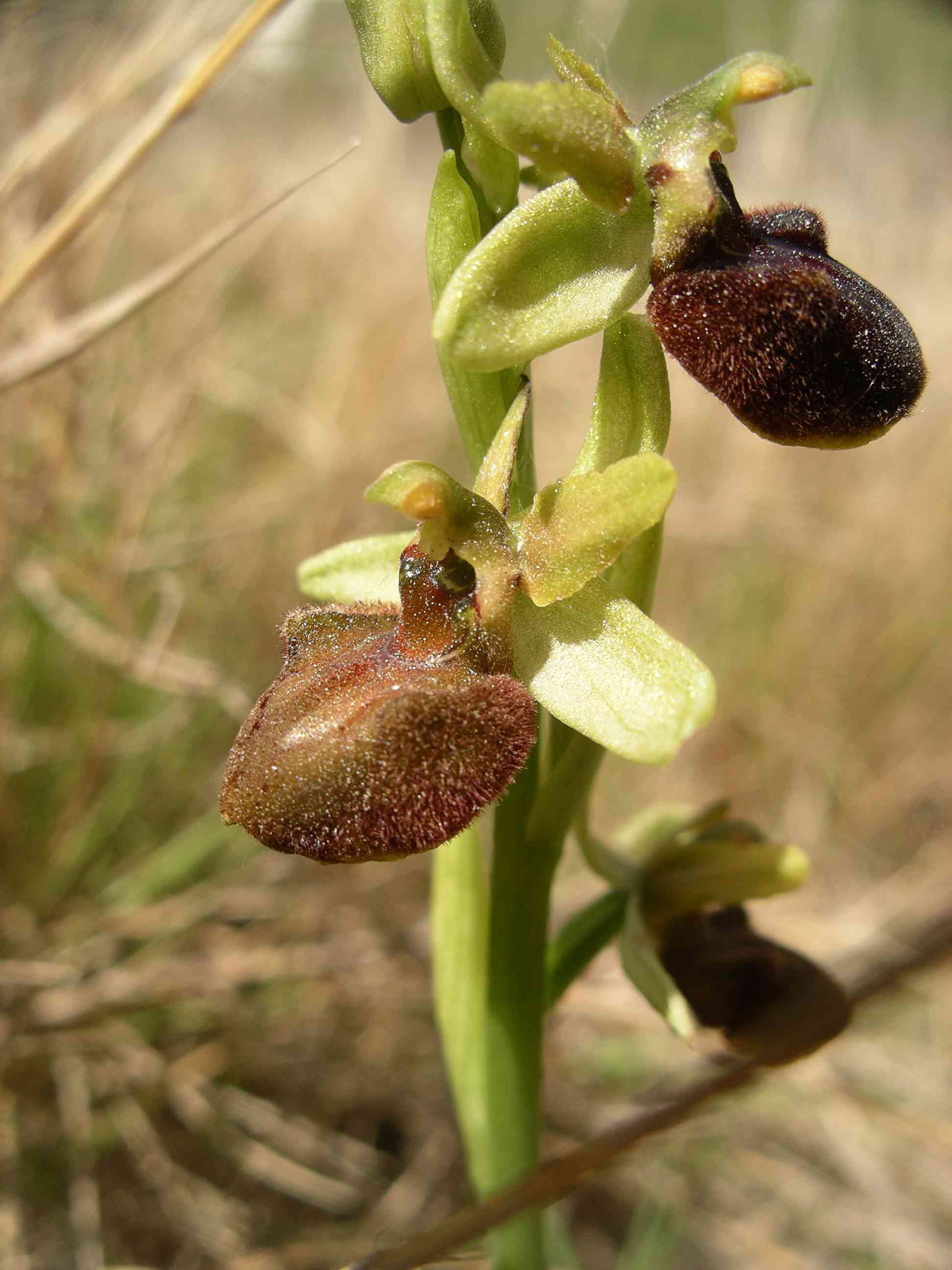
Ophrys sphegodes, the Early Spider Orchid

The isle has the highest number of species of native and anciently introduced wild flowers of any area of comparable size in Britain. This is largely due to the varied geology. The species most frequently sought is Early Spider Orchid (Ophrys sphegodes), which in Britain is most common on Purbeck. Nearly 50,000 flowering spikes were counted in 2009. Late April is the best time, and the largest population is usually in the field to the west of Dancing Ledge. Smaller numbers can be seen on a shorter walk in Durlston Country Park. This orchid is the logo of the Dorset Wildlife Trust. Cowslip meadows (Primula veris and Primula deorum) are at their best shortly afterward, and Durlston Country Park has several large ones.

In early May, several woods have carpets of Wild Garlic (Allium ursinum). King's Wood and Studland Wood, both owned by the National Trust, are good examples. At around the same time and later, some Downs have carpets of yellow Horseshoe Vetch (Hippocrepis comosa) and blue Chalk Milkwort (Polygala calcarea). In late May, the field near Old Harry Rocks has a carpet of yellow Kidney Vetch (Anthyllis vulneraria).

Blue and white flowers of Sheep's bit (Jasione montana) and pink flowers of Sea Bindweed (Calystegia soldanella) lend colour to Studland dunes in June. Both Heath Spotted Orchid (Dactylorhiza maculata) and Southern Marsh Orchid (Dactylorhiza praetermissa) are frequent on Corfe Common that month, and Harebells (Campanula rotundifolia) and Purple Betony (Stachys officinalis) flowers add colour to the Common in July.

Dorset Heath (Erica ciliaris), the county flower, can be found in July and August in large numbers, especially on and around Hartland Moor, in damper parts of the heathland. Bog Asphodel (Narthecium ossifragum) gives displays of yellow flowers there in early July. Marsh Gentian (Gentiana pneumonanthe) is found less frequently in similar areas from mid-August to mid-September.

== Human history ==
A number of Romano-British sites have been discovered and studied on the Isle of Purbeck, including a villa at Bucknowle Farm near Corfe Castle, excavated between 1976 and 1991. The Kimmeridge shale of the isle was worked extensively during the Roman period, into jewellery, decorative panels and furniture.

At the extreme southern tip of Purbeck is St. Aldhelm's Chapel, which is Norman work but built on a pre-Conquest Christian site marked with a circular earthwork and some graves. In 1957, the body of a 13th-century woman was found buried to the north of the chapel, suggesting there may have been a hermitage in the area. In 2000, the whole chapel site was declared a Scheduled Ancient Monument. The precise function of the chapel building is disputed, with suggestions that it may have been a religious retreat, a chantry for the souls of sailors who had drowned off St. Aldhelm's Head, or even a lighthouse or warning bell to warn sailors. Victorian restoration work of the chapel found signs that a beacon may have adorned the roof. The present cross on the roof is Victorian.

The town of Wareham retains its Saxon earth embankment wall, and its churches have Saxon origins. One of these, St Martins-on-the-Walls, was built in 1030 and today contains traces of medieval and later wall paintings.

The village of Corfe Castle is named after the castle that overlooks the village, commanding a strategic gap in the Purbeck Ridge. The present castle dates from after the Conquest of 1066 but may have replaced Saxon work, as the village was where Saxon King Edward the Martyr was murdered in 978. The supposed location of his murder is traditionally on or near the castle mound. Corfe was one of the first English castles to be built in stone, at a time when earth and timber were the norm. This may have been due to the plentiful supply of good building stone on Purbeck.

Sir John Bankes bought the castle in 1635. He was the owner during the English Civil War. His wife, Lady Mary Bankes, led the defence of the castle when it was twice besieged by Parliamentarian forces. The first siege, in 1643, was unsuccessful. Still, by 1645 Corfe was one of the last remaining royalist strongholds in southern England and fell to a siege ending in an assault. In March that year, Corfe Castle was "slighted" (demolished) on Parliament's orders. Owned by the National Trust, the castle is open to the public. It is protected as a Grade I listed building and a Scheduled Ancient Monument.

== Geography ==
A large part of the Isle of Purbeck is within the Dorset National Landscape area. A portion of the coast around Worbarrow Bay and the ghost village of Tyneham is owned by the Ministry of Defence, which has used it as a training area since 1943. Lulworth Ranges are part of the Armoured Fighting Vehicles Gunnery School at Lulworth Camp. Tanks and other armoured vehicles are used in this area and shells are fired. For safety reasons, entry is only permitted when the army ranges are not in operation. Large red flags are flown and flashing warning lamps on Bindon Hill and St Alban's Head are lit when the ranges are in use. At such times the entrance gates are locked, and wardens patrol the area.

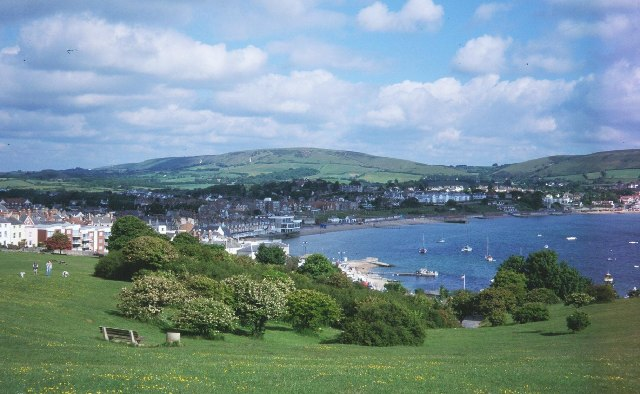
Swanage, the main town and resort of Purbeck, with the Purbeck Hills in the background.

Other places of note are:

- Swanage, at the eastern end of the peninsula, is a seaside resort. At one time it was linked by a branch railway line from Wareham; this was closed in 1972, but has now partially reopened as the Swanage Railway, a heritage railway.
- Studland: This is a seaside village in its own sandy bay. Nearby, lying offshore from The Foreland (also Handfast Point), are the chalk stacks named Old Harry Rocks: Old Harry and his Wife.
- Poole Harbour is popular with bird watchers, windsurfers and yachters; it contains Brownsea Island, the site of the first-ever Scout camp.
- Corfe Castle is in the centre of the isle, overlooking Corfe Castle village.
- Langton Matravers, which was once the home of several boys' preparatory schools; the last of these, The Old Malthouse School, closed in 2007.
- Kimmeridge Bay, with its fossil-rich Jurassic shale cliffs and the oldest continually working oil well in the UK.
- Worth Matravers: A village of stone houses around a pond, which is a regular feature on postcards of the Isle of Purbeck.
