= Arish Mell =

Bay in Dorset, England

Coordinates: 50.622°N 2.207°W

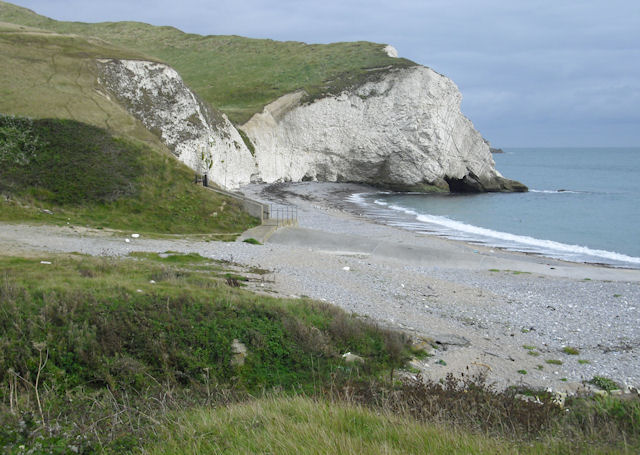
Arish Mell from the west

Arish Mell is a small embayment and beach between Mupe and Worbarrow Bays in Dorset, England and is part of the Jurassic Coast and the South West Coast Path passes just to the north.

Cliffs on either side rise to over 100 m. Bindon Hill is to the west, and Rings Hill is to the east. The bay is about 1 mile (1.6 km) due south of Lulworth Castle and East Lulworth. The bay is relatively inaccessible because it is within the Lulworth Ranges, an Army tank firing range, and although the Range Walks are open at most weekends and public holidays, there is no public access to the beach and cliffs. There are hiking trails that pass by Arish Mell.

Arish Mell forms a small cove about 330 yards wide. From the valley behind, a gate leads onto the shore, but a sign prohibits public access due to the possible danger of unexploded shells. The beach is mostly chalk rocks and flint pebbles, with some parts consisting of coarse sand.

== History ==
Roman remains have been found in the vicinity, including a brooch, a quern stone, and a stone mortar.

Arish Mell was the site of a series of discharge pipes carrying effluent from the Winfrith Nuclear Power Station into the sea. In summer 1959, construction of a 5-mile effluent pipeline from Winfrith to the coast was started. At the coast, twenty lengths of 1,200-foot pipes were taken out to sea by ship. These were welded into continuous lengths extending for two miles. They were lowered and anchored to the seabed.

== Geology ==
Arish Mell forms a break in the line of chalk hills that form the Purbeck Ridge. The bay is within the South Dorset and South-East Devon World Heritage Coast, which runs from Orcombe Point in Devon, to Old Harry Rocks, about 10 miles east of Arish Mell.

== See also ==
- List of Dorset beaches

== Gallery ==
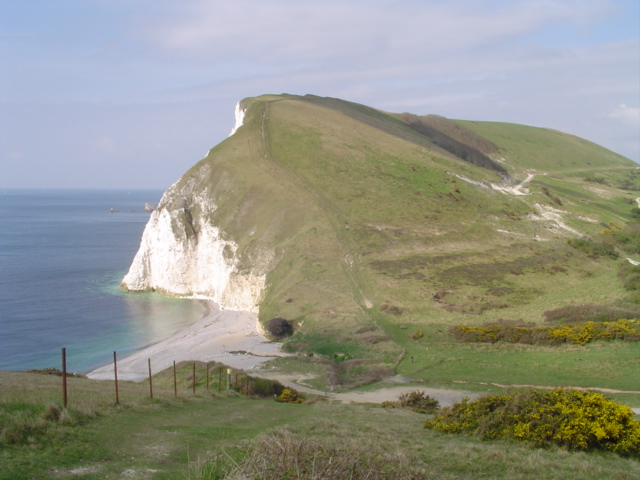
Arish Mell from the east

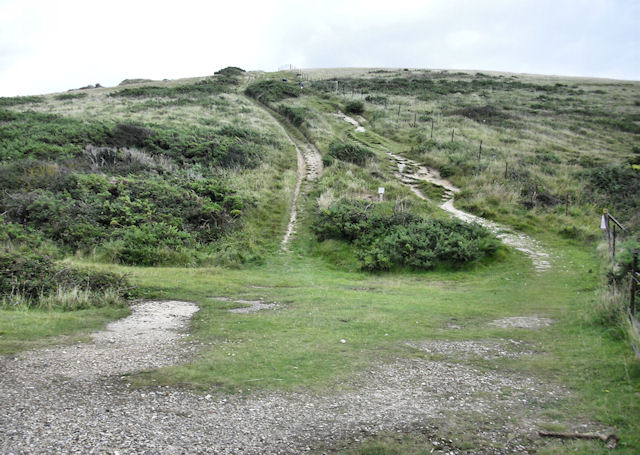
Behind Arish Mell
