= Stair Hole =

Cove in Dorset, England

Coordinates: 50°37′05″N 2°15′09″W

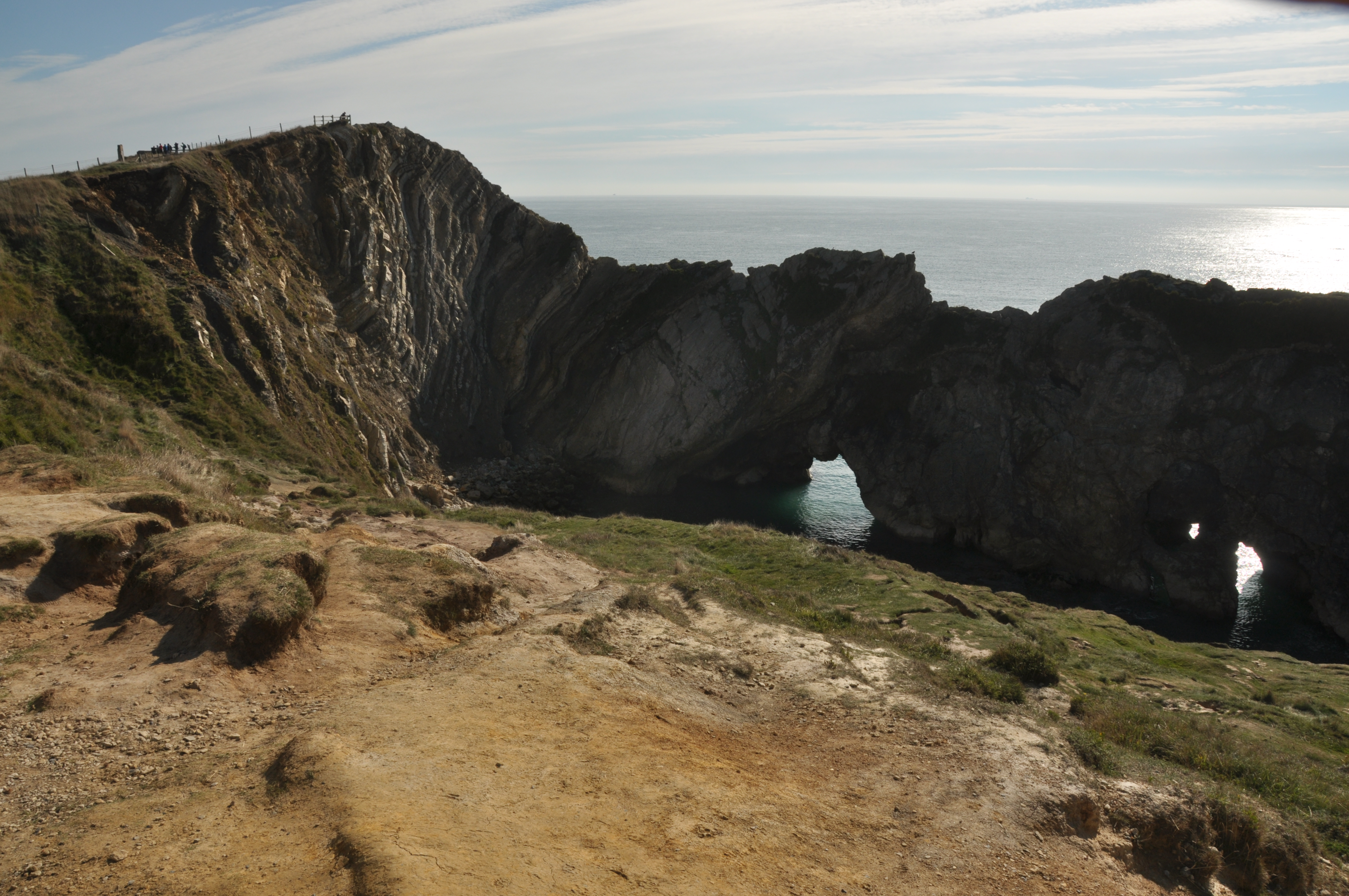
Stair Hole

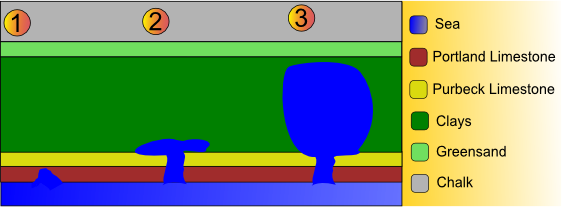
Stair Hole formation

Stair Hole is a small cove located just west of Lulworth Cove in Dorset, southern England. The folded limestone strata known as the Lulworth crumple are particularly visible at Stair Hole. There are several caves visible from the seaward side of Stair Hole; Cathedral Cavern is supported by pillars of rock rising out of the water. The rock structure was created during the Alpine orogeny and exposed by subsequent erosion.

Stair Hole featured in Nuts in May, a Play for Today directed by Mike Leigh, and in Five on a Treasure Island, a 1957 film serial by the Children's Film Foundation and was the background for the climactic sword fight between George Baker and Peter Arne in The Moonraker (1957).

== Gallery ==
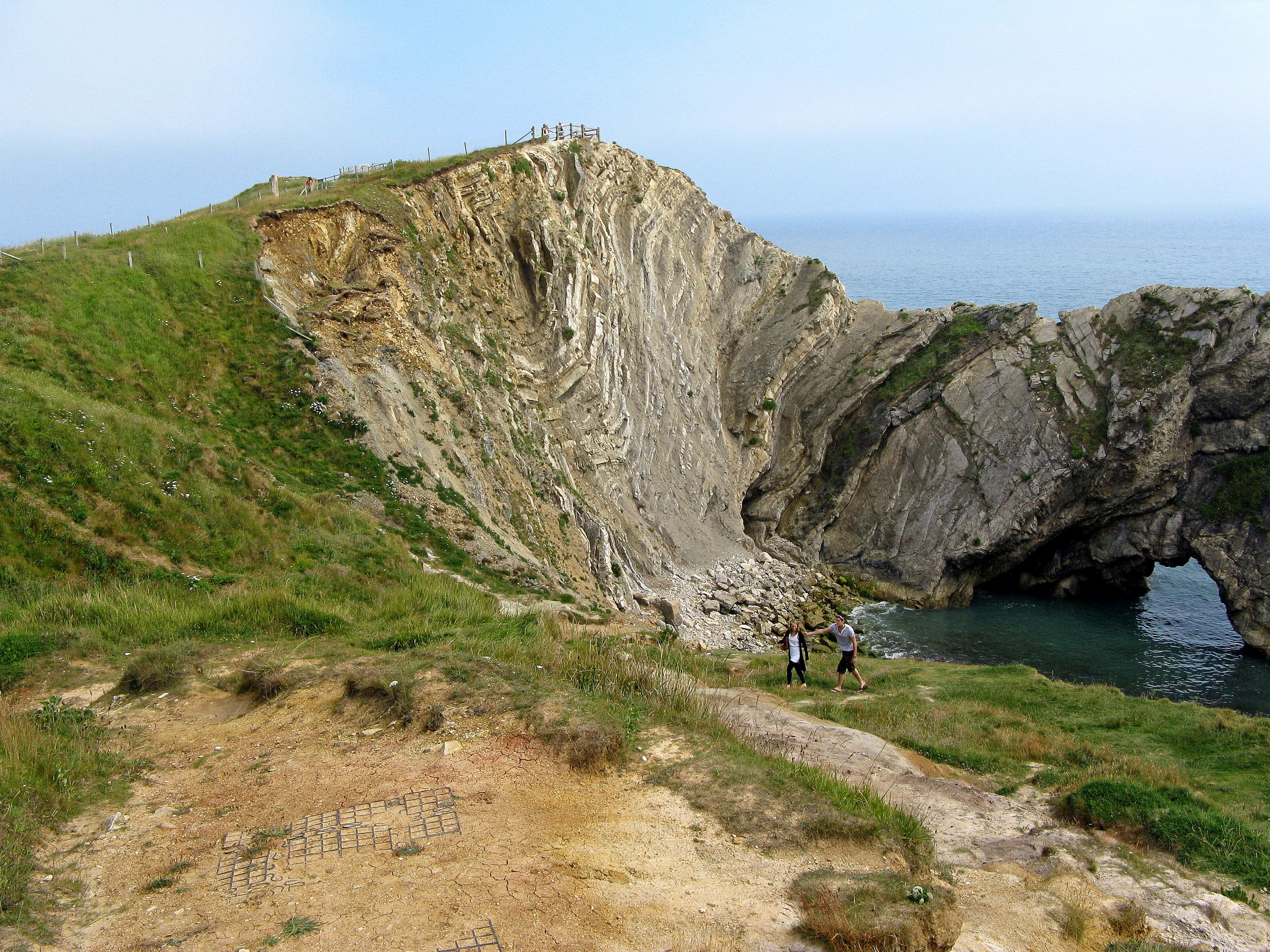
East end of the Lulworth Crumple at Stair Hole

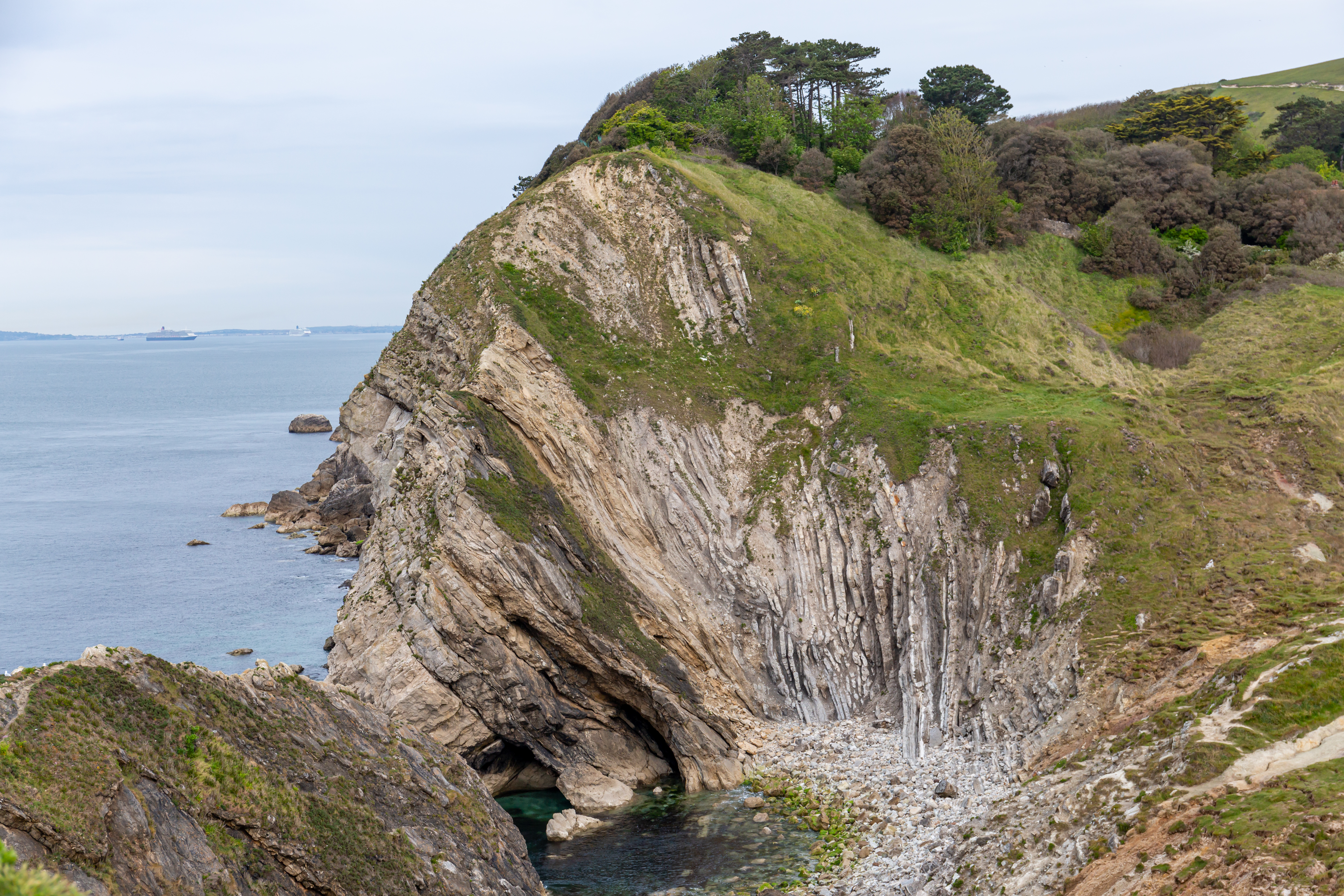
West end of the Lulworth Crumple at Stair Hole

== See also ==
- Durdle Door
