= Mupe Bay =

Bay in Dorset, England

Coordinates: 50°37′7″N 2°13′21″W

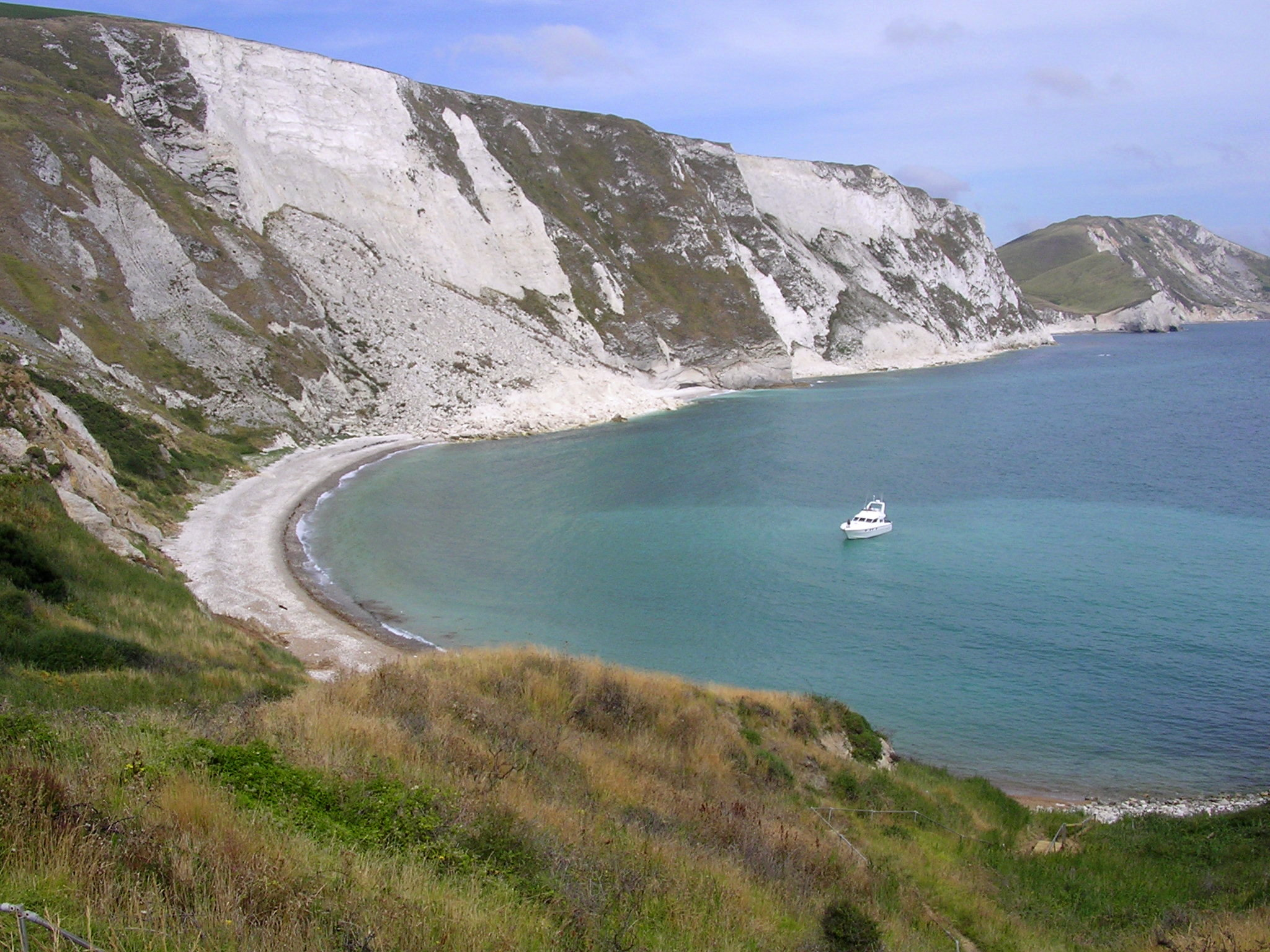
Mupe Bay

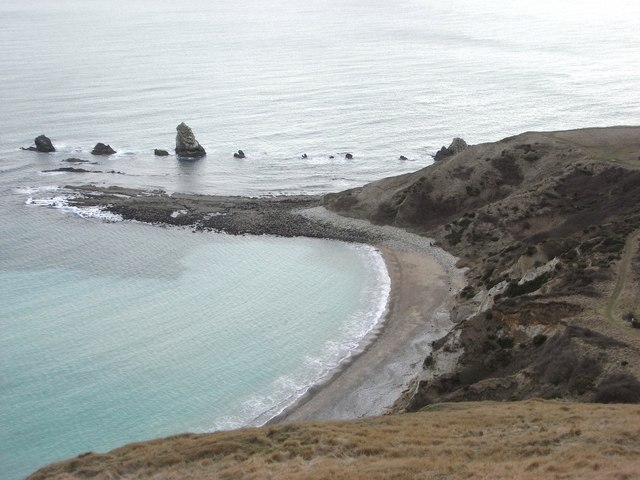
Mupe Beach, Mupe Ledges, and Mupe Rocks

Mupe Bay is a bay with a shingle beach to the east of Lulworth Cove in Dorset, England, and is part of the Jurassic Coast World Heritage Site.

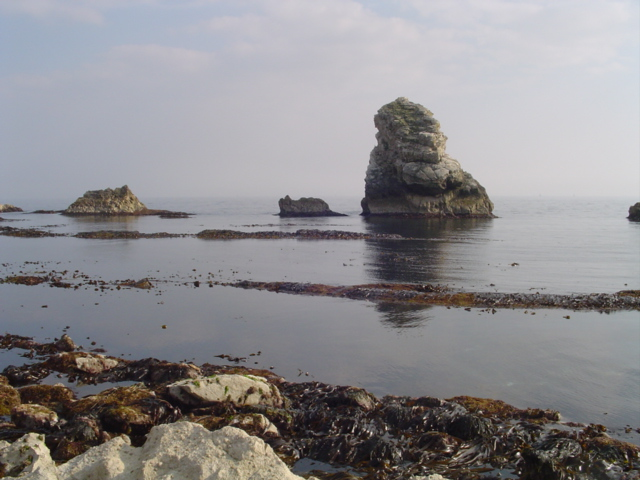
View of Mupe Rocks

The bay exposes a sequence of Cretaceous rocks from the Bindon Hill Chalk in the north through the Wealden Beds to the Purbeck Beds in the south at Mupe Rocks.

Mupe Bay is only accessible when the Lulworth Ranges are open to the public. It can be reached by a 2.5-kilometre (1.6 mi) walk from the car park at Lulworth Cove.

To the south are Mupe Ledges and out to sea Mupe Rocks.

Black Rock is located at the eastern end of the bay.

== See also ==
- List of Dorset beaches
