= Lulworth Ranges =

Shooting ranges in Dorset, England

- Purbeck Hills, Dorset
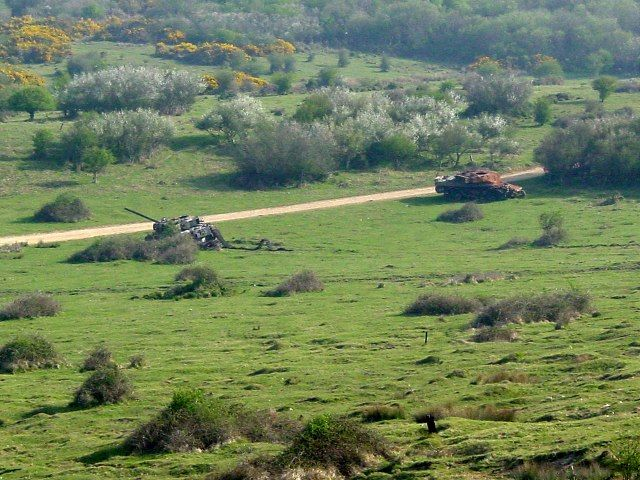
- Tank hulls used as targets on the ranges

Site information
- Type: Range
- Owner: Ministry of Defence
- Operator: British Army

Location
- Location within Dorset
- Coordinates: 50.64000°N 2.17000°W

Site history
- Built: 1917
- Built for: War Office
- In use: 1917-Present

The Lulworth Ranges are military firing ranges located between Wareham and Lulworth in Dorset, England. They cover an area of more than 2,830 hectares (7,000 acres), are leased in a rolling contract from the Weld Estate by the Ministry of Defence and are part of the Armoured Fighting Vehicles Gunnery School based at Lulworth Camp. The ranges were established in 1917.

== Location ==
The ranges are about 10 km (6 mi) west of Swanage and about 15 km (9 mi) east of Dorchester. They lie within an Area of Outstanding Natural Beauty and stretches along the coastline between the east of Lulworth Cove to just west of Kimmeridge. The coastline is part of the Jurassic Coast, a UNESCO World Heritage Site. The range includes the ghost village of Tyneham, deserted in 1943 and abandoned permanently following its compulsory purchase by the Army in 1948.

== Use ==
The ranges are used for static and mobile live-firing practice by tanks and other armoured vehicles. The ranges are cleared for use by tank main armament and other vehicle-mounted heavy weapons.

=== Moving targetry system ===
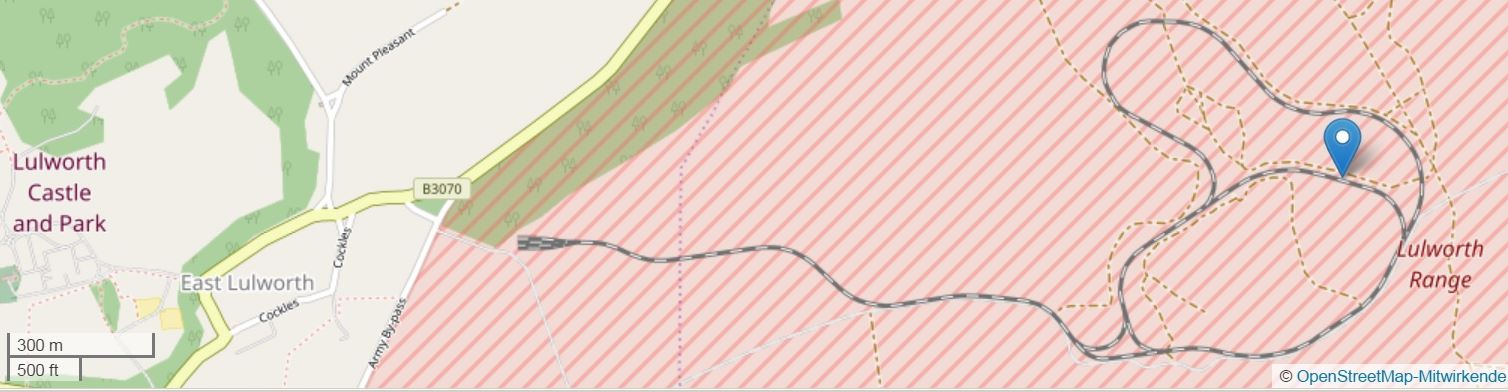
Track of moving targetry system

Lulworth Ranges has an electrically powered rail targetry system which is visible on Google Earth and from the surrounding hills. The railway consists of a four track shed on a short branch, which is connected to a small within a large loop.

== Access ==
For safety reasons, access to the public is only permissible when the ranges are not in operation. Large red flags are flown and flashing warning lamps on Bindon Hill and St Alban's Head are lit when the ranges are in use. At such times the entrance gates are locked and wardens patrol the area.

Access to the area is by foot either via the South West Coast Path or from the car parks at Lulworth Castle, Tyneham, Ridgeway Hill and Povington Hill. The range walks and coast path are open most weekends and some weekdays.
