= Lulworth Cove =

Cove on the Jurassic Coast, England

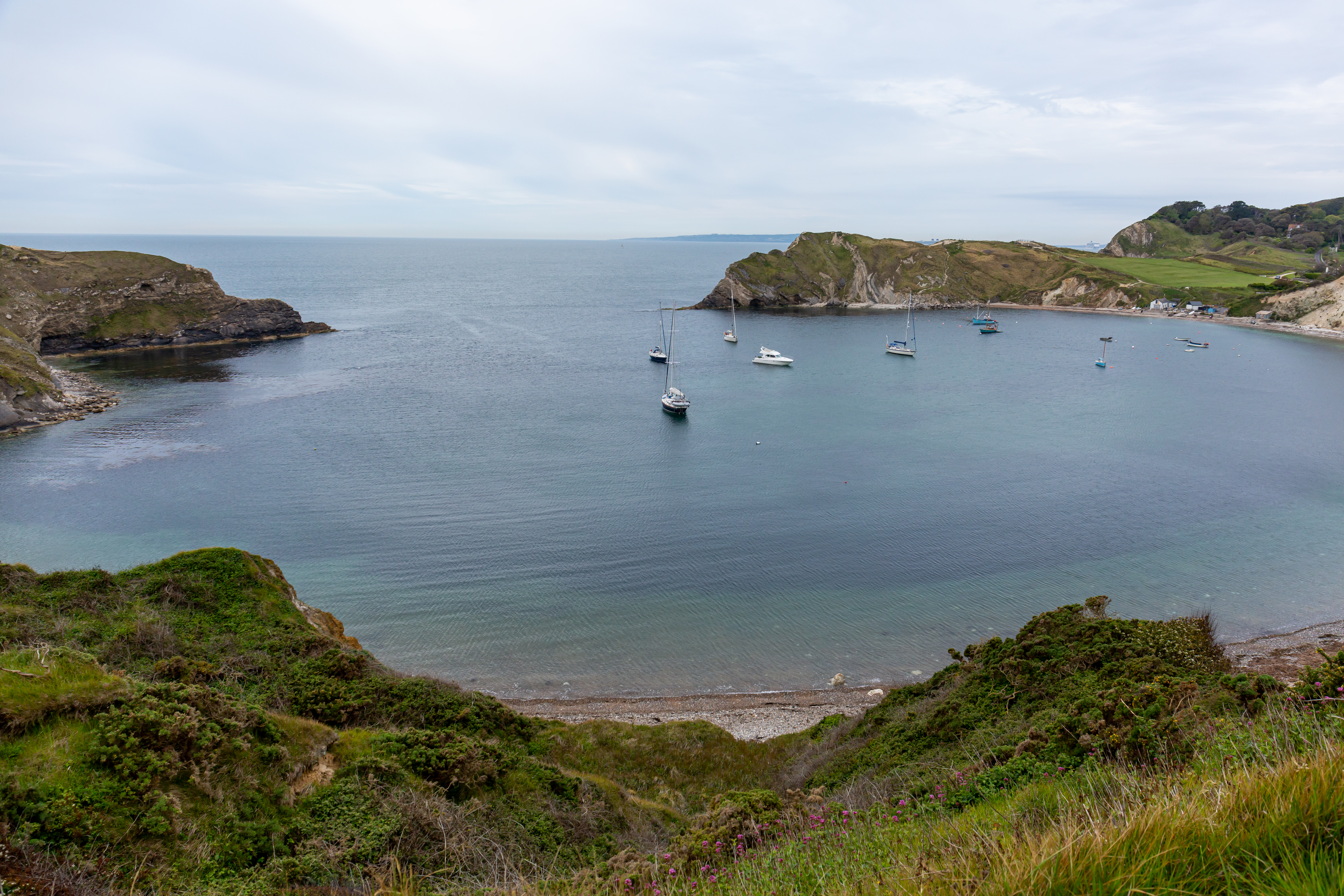
- Lulworth Cove from the north

- Location: Dorset, England
- Coordinates: 50.6183°N 2.2469°W

Lulworth Cove is a cove near the village of West Lulworth, on the Jurassic Coast in Dorset, southern England. It is privately owned by the Weld family along with Durdle Door and the Lulworth Estate. The cove is one of the world's finest examples of such a landform, and is a World Heritage Site and tourist location with approximately 500,000 visitors every year, of whom about 30 per cent visit in July and August. It is close to the rock arch of Durdle Door and other Jurassic Coast sites.

== Geology ==
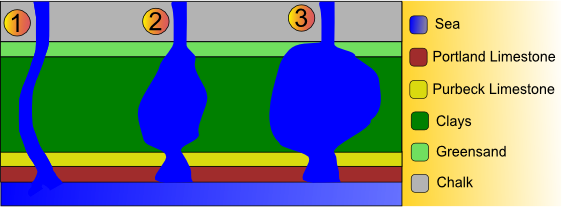
Lulworth Cove formation

The cove has formed as a result of bands of rock of alternating geological resistance running parallel to the coastline (a concordant coastline). On the seaward side the clays and sands have been eroded.

A narrow (less than 30 metres (98 ft)) band of Portland limestone rocks forms the shoreline. Behind this is a narrow (less than 50 metres (160 ft)) band of slightly less-resistant Purbeck limestone. Behind this are 300 to 500 metres (980 to 1,640 ft) of much less-resistant clays and greensands; Weald Clays, Gault and Upper Greensand.

Forming the back of the cove is a 250-metre-wide (820 ft) band of chalk, which is considerably more resistant than the clays and sands, but less resistant than the limestones. The entrance to the cove is a narrow gap in the limestone bands, formed by wave action and weathering. The wide part of the cove is where the weak clays and greensands have been eroded.

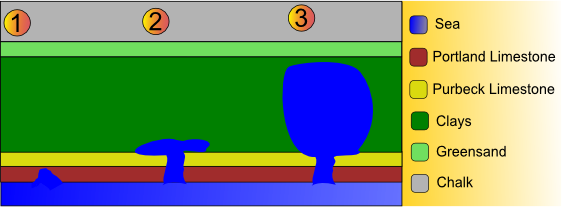
Stair Hole formation

Stair Hole, less than 0.5 miles (0.8 km) to the west, is an infant cove which suggests what Lulworth Cove would have looked like a few hundred thousand years ago. The sea has made a gap in the Portland and Purbeck limestone here to the Wealden clays and begun eroding them.

== Geography ==
The shape of the cove is a result of wave diffraction. The narrow entrance to the cove causes waves to bend into an arc shape, as is visible in the panorama photograph.

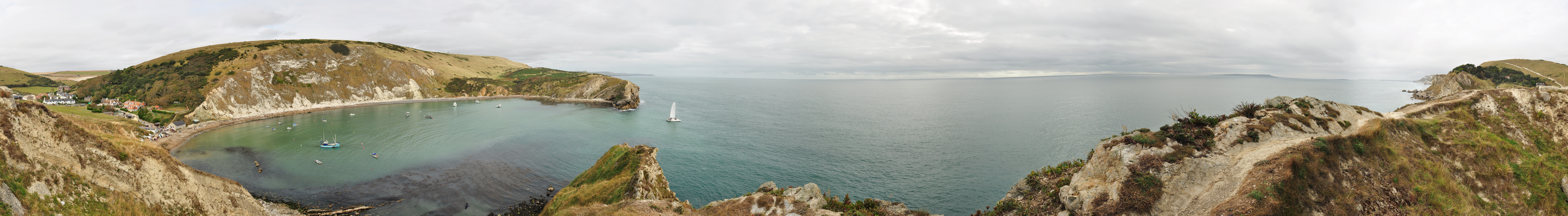

== Conservation ==
As well as the cove, across Hambury Tout (the large chalk hill to the west) is Durdle Door, a natural arch. To the east there is a fossilised forest. Lulworth is also close to Kimmeridge, famous for its rocky shore and fossils. Geologists and geographers have been interested in the area since the beginning of the 19th century, and in the 1830s the first serious study of the area took place. Since then the area has drawn students from all over the world.

The area suffers from trampling from its many visitors. Wooden steps, fences and steps have been put in place to limit this surface damage. Each year over 250,000 people walk across the hill linking the cove to Durdle Door.

In 2001 the coast was granted World Heritage Site status by UNESCO. Experts at UNESCO have been working on preserving the shape of Lulworth Cove. Lulworth was one of a number of gateway villages on the coast with a Heritage Centre—part visitor centre, tourist information and natural history museum; in 2002 the last received 418,595 visitors.

The coast and land to the north and around the village is privately owned and managed by the Lulworth Estate. Land to the east, including Tyneham, is owned by the Ministry of Defence and used for tank training; it is open only at weekends and holidays.

== In popular culture ==
- Four Sided Triangle (1953)
- Nuts in May (1976)
- The Boys in Blue (1982)
- The Curse of Fenric (1989)
- Seven Natural Wonders (2005)
- Walking Through History (2013)
- World War Z (2013)

== Miscellaneous ==
The bay of Lulworth Sinus in the largest hydrocarbon sea, Kraken Mare, on Saturn's largest moon, Titan, is named after Lulworth Cove.

== See also ==
- Geology of Dorset
- List of Dorset beaches
