= Durlston Castle =

Castle in the United Kingdom

Coordinates: 50.5951°N 1.9534°W

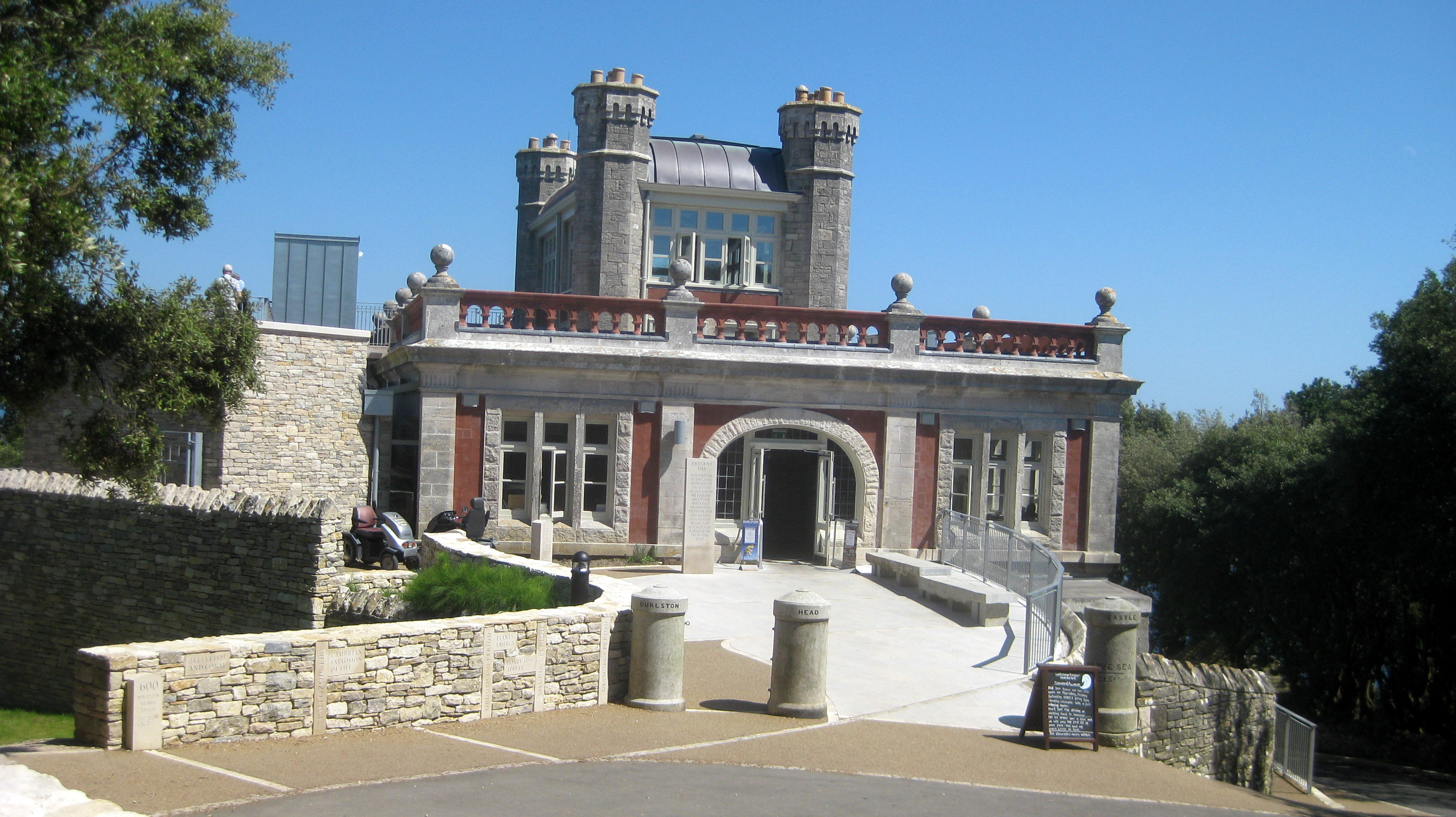
Durlston Castle, main entrance 2012

Durlston Castle stands within Durlston Country Park, a 1.13 square-kilometre (280-acre) country park and nature reserve stretching along the coastline south of Swanage, on the Isle of Purbeck in Dorset.

== History ==
John Mowlem (1788-1868), a Swanage-born man, was a stonemason and builder. He was the founder of the quarrying and construction company Mowlem. He and his nephew and business partner George Burt (1816-1894) wanted to give something back to their home town, which was the source of their Portland and Purbeck limestone, popular for building at the time. John Mowlem built the Mowlem Institute, a reading room and public library, in 1862. George Burt purchased an undulating tract of land covering Durlston Head during the same year. This estate, the Durlston Estate, included quarries that supplied their firm with limestone. Burt developed this estate as a tourist attraction.

Burt established the Durlston Estate upon the crest of the hill and here he built his folly Durlston Castle. The castle was designed by the Weymouth architect G.R. Crickmay (1830-1907) and built by W.M. Hardy in 1886-87 entirely of local stone. The 'castle' was never a real castle: it was purpose-built by Burt as a restaurant for the visitors to his estate.

The castle played a part in the evolution of radio and telecommunications. A team of Marconi's engineers used the roof of the castle in the 1890s for some of their early wireless experiments to transmit to the Isle of Wight.

The castle passed through the hands of many owners until in 1973 it was bought by Dorset County Council. It was designated as a listed building at Grade II in 1983.

== Description ==
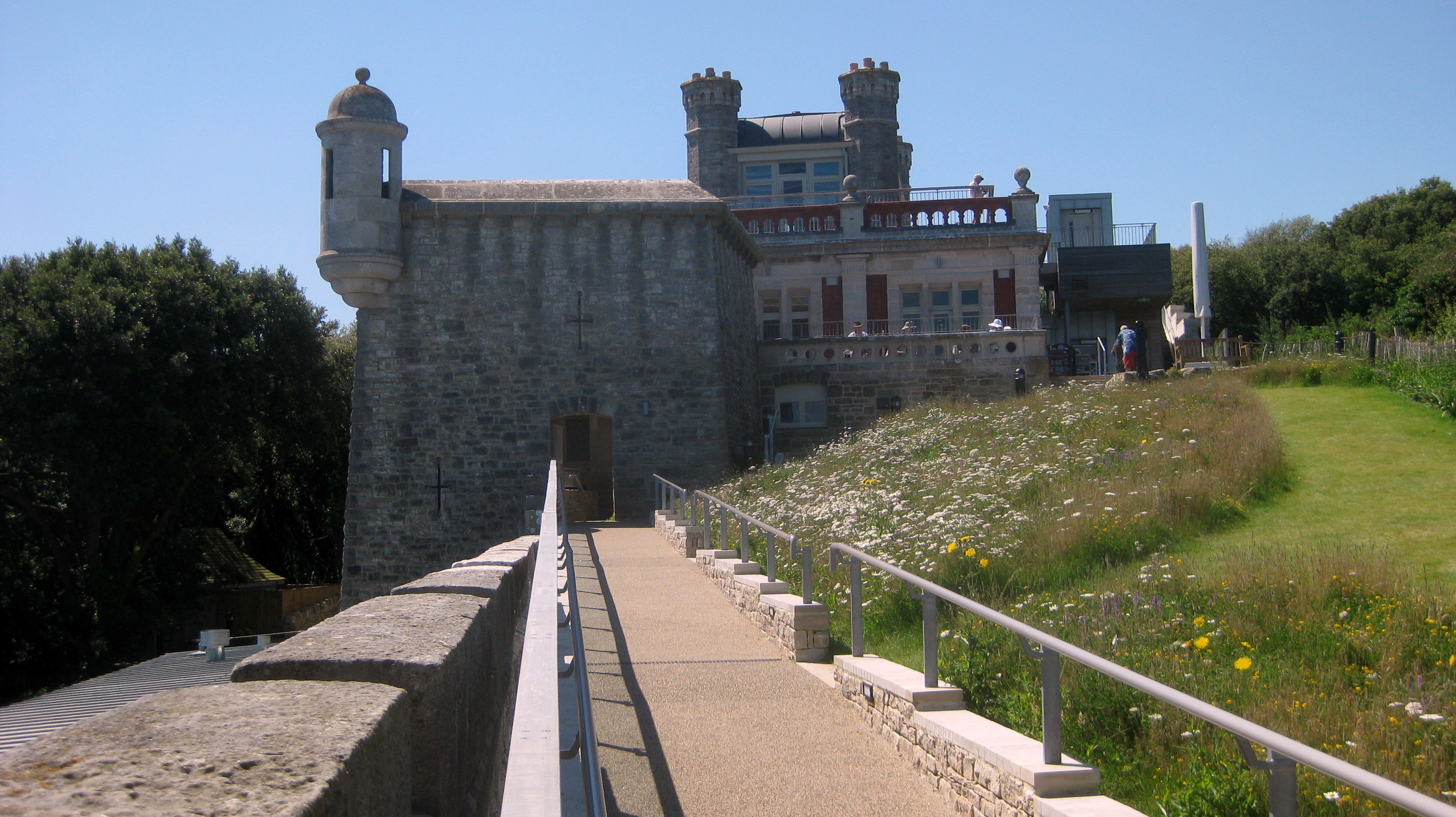
2012-07-25 Durlston Castle view from rear

The side wall of the castle features a sundial and two stone tablets inscribed with various statistics such as clock times and tides around the world. South of the castle is the Great Globe, built by Burt in 1887. The footpaths around the Castle and Great Globe are lined with cast iron bollards that were brought from London. All around the estate there are further stone plaques carved with quotations from Shakespeare and the Bible, maps showing the English Channel and the United Kingdom, and further facts about the natural world. These surrounds were placed during the period 1887 to 1891.

Also within the Durlston Country Park and within walking distance of the Globe are Durlston Bay, the Tilly Whim Caves and the Anvil Point Lighthouse. The Park is partly of the Jurassic Coast World Heritage Site (although the castle itself is outside the boundary) and is included on the Historic England Register of Historic Parks and Gardens at Grade II.

== Restoration ==
Durlston Castle and the Great Globe were both restored during 2010 and 2011 by the Council. The castle now houses a new Visitor Centre to Durlston Country Park and National Nature Reserve, and stands as a gateway to the Jurassic Coast. It also contains an art gallery and a cafe.

== See also ==
- Durlston Country Park
