= Anvil Point =

Headland on the Isle of Purbeck in Dorset, England

Coordinates: 50°35′31″N 1°57′36″W

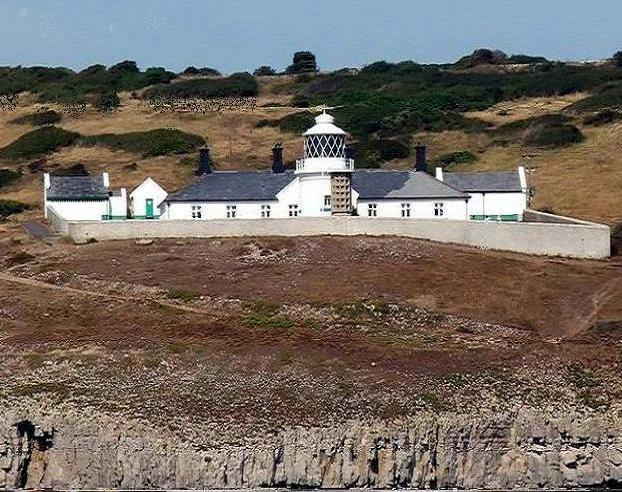
The Lighthouse on Anvil Point

Anvil Point is a headland that is part of the Jurassic Coast on the Isle of Purbeck in Dorset, England. It is within the grounds of Durlston Country Park and is about 3 kilometres (1.9 mi) from Swanage town centre. Anvil Point Lighthouse is located on the point and was established in 1881.

A Point-class sealift ship is named after the headland.

== Geology ==
Anvil Point is in the eastern part of the Portland limestone and the Purbeck beds that stretches from Durlston Head to St. Aldhelm's Head. For a long time the cliffs along this stretch of coast were quarried at Tilly Whim Caves, Dancing Ledge, Seacombe and Winspit.

== Leisure ==
Local leisure activities include walking and rock climbing.
