= Durlston =

Suburb of Swanage, Dorset, England

Coordinates: 50.6006°N 1.9581°W

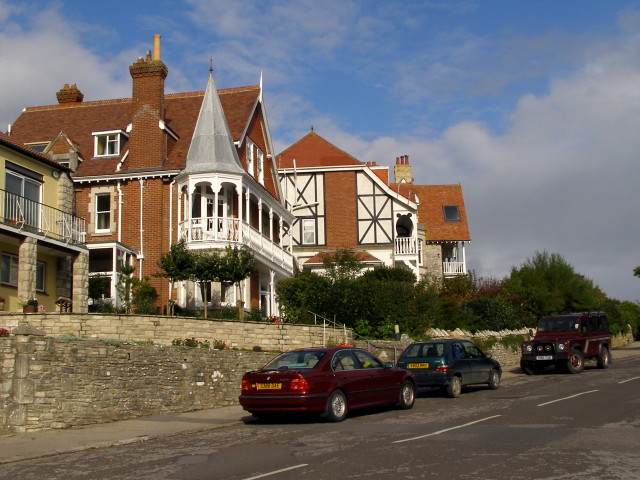
- Houses on Durlston Road

- Location within Dorset
- OS grid reference: SZ030778
- Civil parish: Swanage
- Unitary authority: Dorset
- Ceremonial county: Dorset
- Region: South West
- Country: England
- Sovereign state: United Kingdom
- Post town: SWANAGE
- Postcode district: BH19
- Dialling code: 01929
- Police: Dorset
- Fire: Dorset and Wiltshire
- Ambulance: South Western
- UK Parliament: South Dorset

Durlston is an area of Swanage, in Dorset, England. The area was developed by George Burt as a residential suburb, and includes many large Victorian villas as well as modern developments.

== Durlston Country Park ==
Durlston has a country park overlooking Durlston Bay, with a mock castle built in 1887. The castle (a restaurant when built, and still in use as a cafe) is surrounded by stone ornaments, including the Great Globe, three metres in diameter. The area is now owned and managed by Dorset Council. There is a modern visitors' centre on the hillside above the castle.
