= Prince Albert Gardens =

Park in Swanage, Dorset, England

Coordinates: 50°36′25″N 1°57′08″W

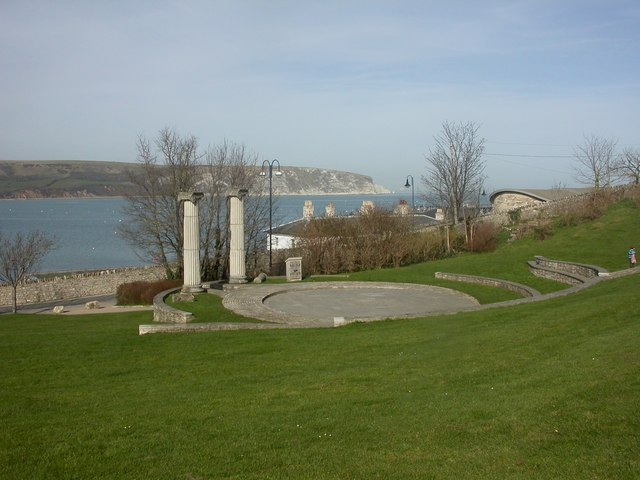
The Prince Albert Gardens

Prince Albert Gardens is a park in Swanage, Dorset, England. It was established in 1996.

== Origins ==
The site was originally open grazing land. Prior to being established as a park, Prince Albert Gardens was the site of a miniature golf course.

Prince Albert Gardens was established in 1996 as part of the Swanage Seafront Improvement Scheme. In 1997 the project received a commendation at the Civic Trust Awards.

== Features ==
The landscaping of the gardens forms a gradual transition from the urban edge of town to the wilder adjoining landscape of the Downs.

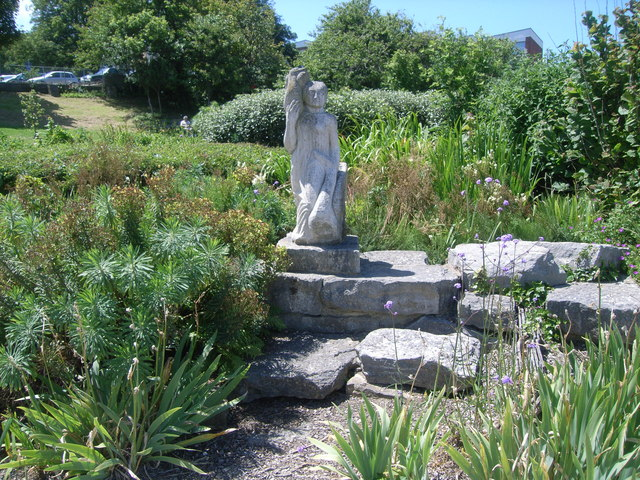
The Lady of the Rocks by Mary Spencer Watson

A sculpture by Mary Spencer Watson, the Lady of the Rocks, made from Purbeck stone, is located in the gardens.

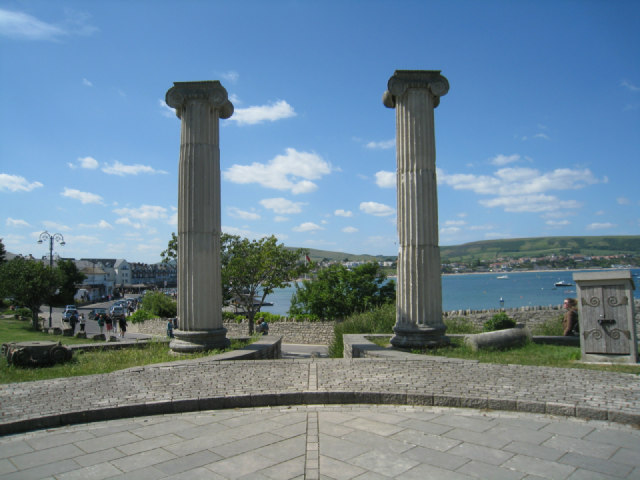
The Ionic columns in Prince Albert Gardens

The gardens also feature two Ionic columns, made from Portland stone and dating from the early 19th-century, around which is built an outdoor amphitheatre. The columns, which are Grade II listed, were formerly part of the forecourt of the Grosvenor Hotel, which has been demolished since the columns were listed.

The Prince Albert Memorial was erected by George Burt in 1862, and was the first civic memorial to Prince Albert. It was removed from its original site in 1971, and stored, until it was re-established at the eastern end of Prince Albert Gardens in 2021. There had been earlier attempts in 1996 and 2000 to place the memorial in the gardens.

In June each year the gardens host the Swanage Fish Festival. An episode of BBC's Songs of Praise was filmed in the gardens in 2021. Other music and theatre performances take place in the gardens. The open air theatre group, SISATA, started with a week's run in the gardens in 2012.
