= Durlston Country Park =

Park in Dorset, England

Coordinates: 50.5951°N 1.9528°W

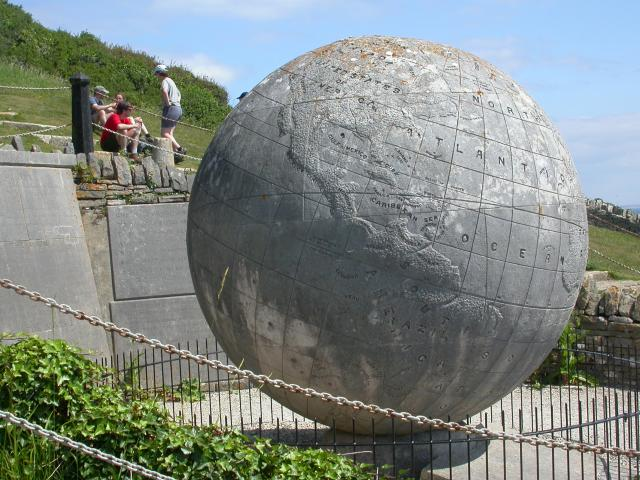
The Great Globe at Swanage

Durlston Country Park is a 320-acre country park and nature reserve stretching along the coast of the Isle of Purbeck on the outskirts of Swanage in Dorset, England. The park is a popular destination for tourists to enjoy the walks, views, visitor centre, climbing, and wildlife, including Durlston Castle, the Great Globe, Tilly Whim Caves, and Anvil Point Lighthouse. It is a gateway to the Jurassic Coast World Heritage Site, forms part of the 630 mile South West Coast Path, and is owned by Dorset Council.

== Wildlife and Geology ==
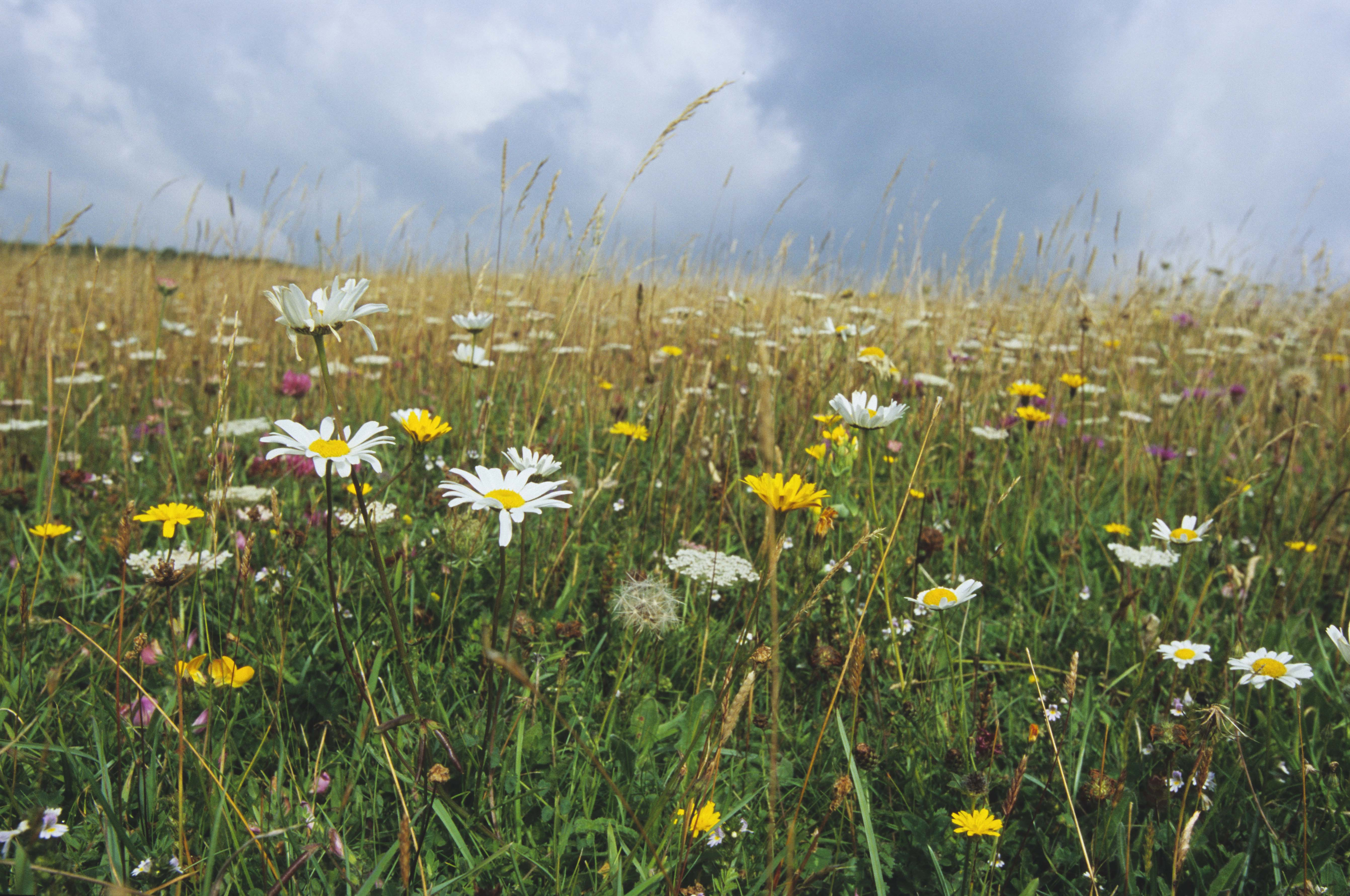
Wildflower Meadow at Durlston Country Park

The Park has a mosaic of habitats, hosting a wide range of species. Habitats include sea-cliffs, downs, ancient meadows, hedgerows, woodland, and dry-stone walls – each with their characteristic plants and animals. These include 33 species of breeding butterfly, over 250 species of bird recorded, 500 wildflowers, 500 moths and thousands of other invertebrates. The site is an important resting place for migrating birds in the spring and autumn. The sea-cliffs are home to a variety of breeding seabirds including a colony of 400 guillemots - the second largest on the south coast of England. The rangers write a wildlife diary every morning which can be read on their website.

The underlying rock is limestone so the majority of the park is calcareous grassland, probably created about 1000 years ago by clearing of oak forest, hosting a range of wild flower species and associated animals such as butterflies. The sea-cliffs at Durlston are popular climbing areas; Subliminal, Boulder Ruckle and Cattle Troughs.

== History ==
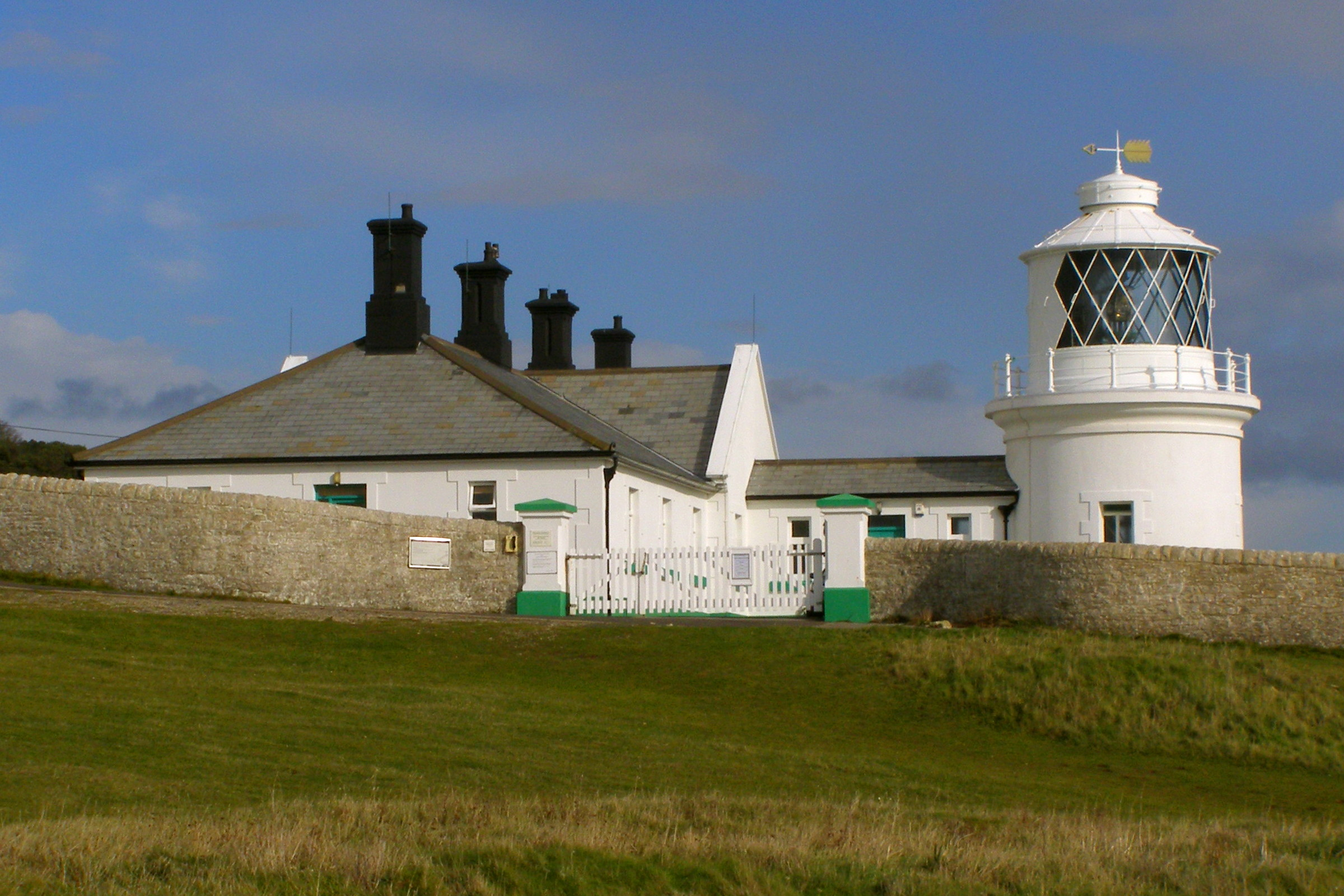
The Lighthouse at Anvil Point

In the 19th and 20th centuries Purbeck was quarried for its high-quality limestone. There were few open-cast quarries, and none in Durlston, but there are many mine shafts across the landscape, notably Tilly Whim Caves in a dry glacial meltwater valley.

In 1887 George Burt built a small Castle at Durlston Head, on the hill above Durlston Bay and the town of Swanage. The Durlston Castle was never a real castle, but was purpose-built to be used as a restaurant for his Durlston estate. Burt also commissioned a 40-ton limestone Great Globe, three metres in diameter, engraved with an 1880s world map. The footpaths around the Castle and Globe are lined with cast iron London bollards which were left in Swanage having been used as ballast by the ships transporting stone to London. Other ornaments include plaques carved with quotations from Shakespeare and the Bible, maps showing the English Channel and the United Kingdom, and facts about the natural world.

== Facilities and Events ==
Durlston Castle hosts a Visitor Centre, Toilets, Shop, Cafe, Gallery, Cinema Room, and Fossil Room (open every day except Christmas Day and Boxing Day). Durlston hosts an extensive events programme which can be viewed on their website. Events include ranger-led guided walks, family activity trails, sea-bird boat trips, stargazing, arts & crafts and other children's events. The Visitor Centre hosts a Belvedere and Fine Foundation Gallery which regularly hosts exhibitions, performances, weddings, and other functions. The Learning Centre hosts an activity classroom available for hire by schools, businesses, and community groups. Ranger-led 'Discovery Sessions' offer teachers and students a fantastic opportunity for outdoor learning.

== Accessibility ==
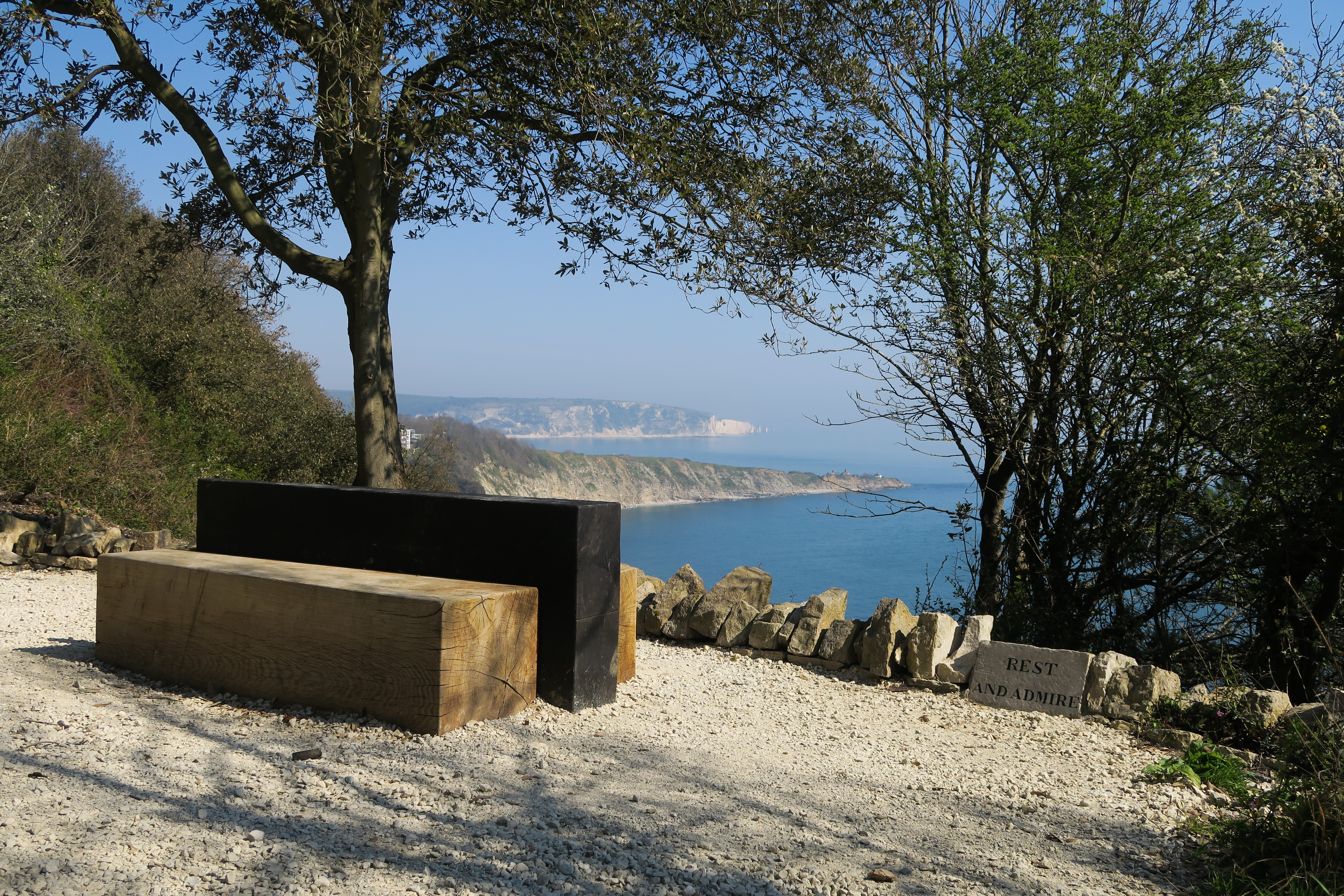
Viewpoint at Durlston Country Park

Durlston won Gold in VisitEngland's Awards for Excellence 2020 in the Accessible and Inclusive Tourism category. The park has put a lot of investment into improving its footpaths, making them easier to walk along or for use with off-road wheelchairs or mobility scooters that are available to hire at the Visitor Centre. The accessible 'Everyone Needs a Shed' facility welcomes people of all ages and abilities to socialise, learn new skills, and volunteer in support of the park.

== Awards and designations ==
The Park is Grade II listed in the National Register of Historic Parks and Gardens. Most of the Park is designated Site of Special Scientific Interest and since 1997, a Special Area of Conservation. The majority is also designated as a Site of Nature Conservation Importance. In 1997 the Dorset and East Devon Coast was awarded World Heritage Site status for its geological importance. Durlston is in the Dorset National Landscape area and the Purbeck Heritage Coast (which holds a Council of Europe Diploma for its management). In June 2008, Durlston was awarded national nature reserve status by Natural England in recognition of the national importance of Durlston for wildlife. Durlston has also been awarded the Green Flag Award in recognition of the quality of its amenities for visitors.

== Travel ==
The car parks provide space for cars, motorbikes, coaches and bicycles. Buses from Poole (No. 40) and Bournemouth (No. 50) arrive at Swanage Bus Station which is a one-mile walk from Durlston Country Park. The Durlston Explorer bus D5 normally runs shuttles from Swanage Bus Station every half hour between May and September.
