= Prince Albert Memorial, Swanage =

Memorial to Prince Albert in Prince Albert Gardens, Swanage

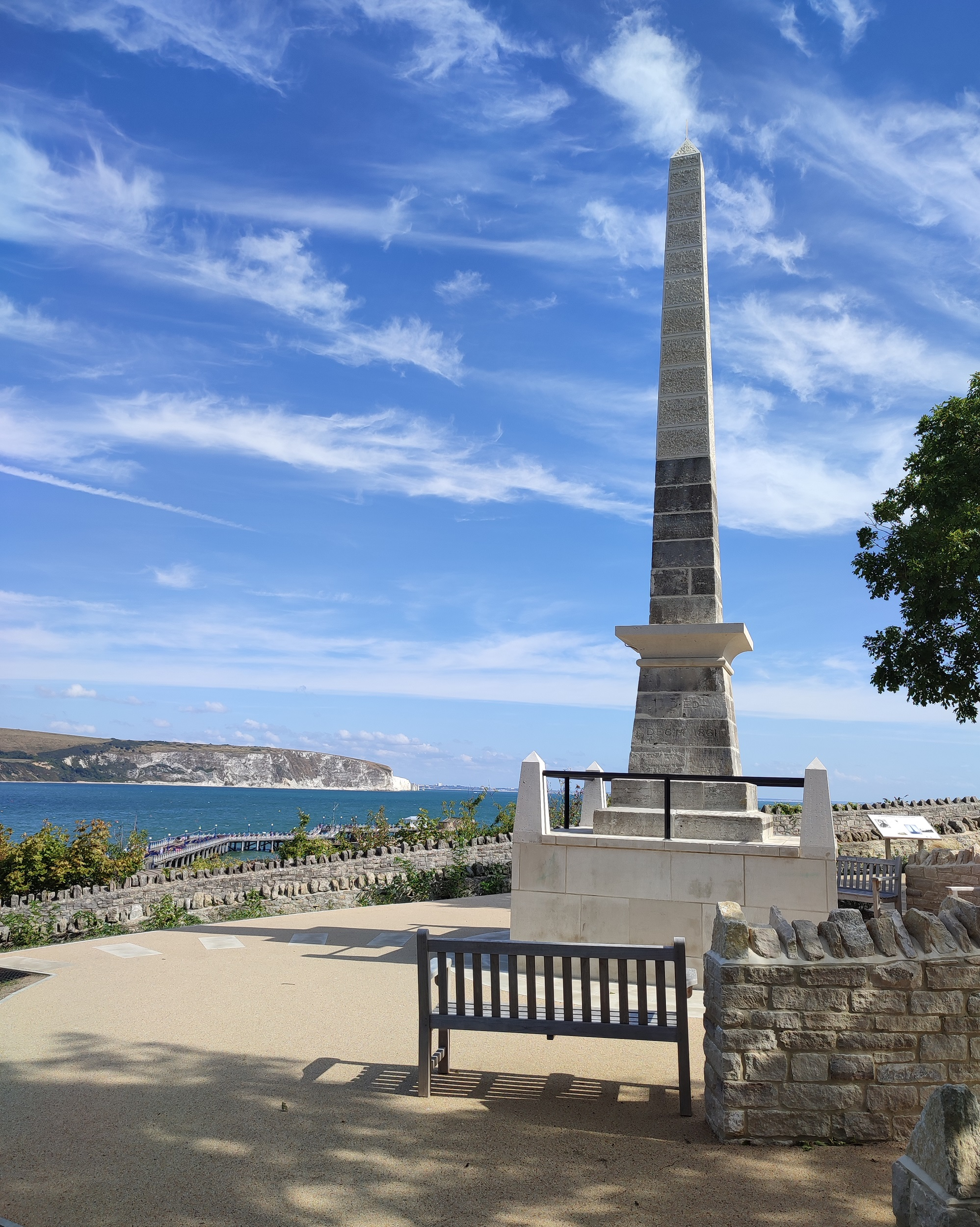
The memorial after reinstatement in 2021

The Prince Albert Memorial is a memorial in Swanage, Dorset in the form of a stone obelisk to Prince Albert, the consort of Queen Victoria, who died in 1861. The memorial was erected in 1862, and is notable for having been the earliest civic memorial to the Prince. It was dismantled in 1971, and only rebuilt 50 years later, in 2021.

== 1862 memorial ==
In January 1862, just four weeks after Prince Albert's death, Swanage builder George Burt wrote to the Rector of Swanage, the Revd Duncan Travers, to propose the erection of an obelisk of native stone. Burt's design was modelled on the obelisk in Ludgate Circus (now in Salisbury Square, off Fleet Street), commemorating the politician Robert Waithman.

Built of Purbeck stone, the memorial was the first civic memorial to be erected to Prince Albert, in 1862. The memorial by Thomas Worthington in Albert Square, Manchester, was the first major memorial and the first to depict an effigy of the Prince, but was not erected until three years after the one in Swanage, in 1865. The memorial was located on Court Hill, near to the current site of the Royal British Legion.

== Deterioration, and removal ==
The top two courses were damaged by the Great Blizzard in 1881, only being restored after Burt reminded the local authority that it had accepted responsibility for its maintenance. It was damaged by a heavy storm in 1901, but was still intact in 1925. By 1931 the top 13 courses had been removed, probably by local builder Frank Smith on the instructions of the owner of the adjacent property at 158 High Street, who believed it had become unsafe but had been unable to get the council to act. The stone was taken to Smith's yard on Northbrook Road and then, 15 years later, was sold to George Hancock & Co. Hancock was acquired by Lander's Quarries and the stone was taken to its yard at Langton Matravers.

Local historian David Lewer attempted to have the memorial restored for the centenary of Prince Albert's death in 1961, but without success. The developer of 160 High Street obtained planning permission for the construction of housing and, as such, was to agree the relocation of the stump of the memorial. Despite this, the memorial was removed and its remains stored.

There were abortive attempts to re-establish the memorial for the Queen's Silver Jubilee in 1977, when Prince Albert Gardens was opened in 1996 and for the Millennium in 2000.

== 2021 rebuilding ==
Planning permission for the re-erection of the memorial was obtained in 2020. At the time, the surviving remnants of the memorial were stored at St Aldhelm's quarry in Worth Matravers. The work was commissioned by Swanage and Purbeck Development Trust and Swanage Museum & Heritage Centre, and paid for by a private benefactor, Mike Sloggett. The work was undertaken by Dorset Design Build.

The new location is in Prince Albert Gardens, close to Peveril Point where Prince Albert is said to have disembarked from the royal yacht (HMY Victoria and Albert) on his visit to the town in 1856. Prince Albert Gardens was built on the site of a former miniature golf course: the memorial is located on the site of the 4th hole.

The memorial was opened in 2021.
