= Great Globe =

Giant limestone globe in Swanage, Dorset, England

Coordinates: 50°35′42″N 1°57′07″W

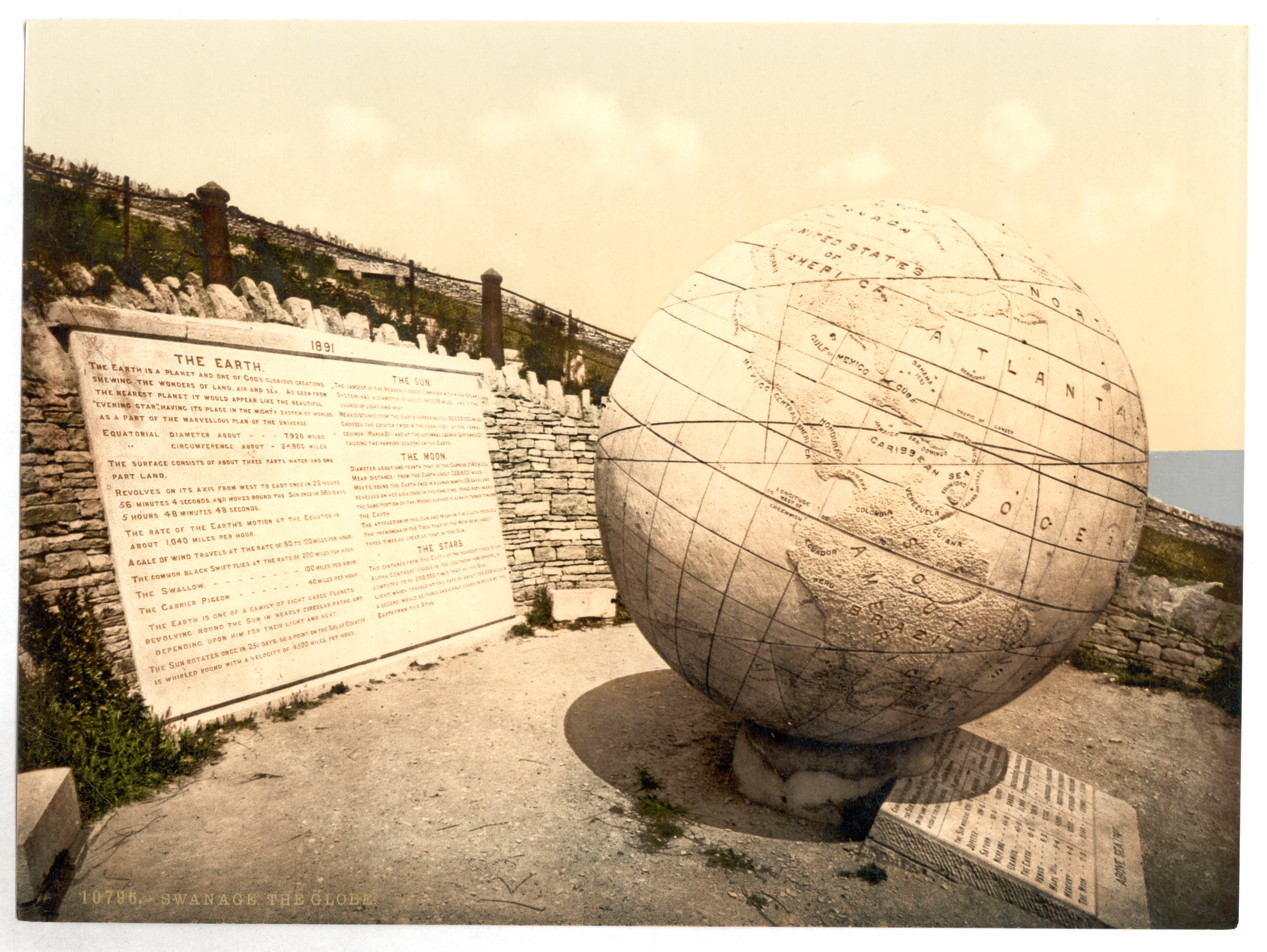
The Great Globe, Durlston Country Park (1890s photochrome)

The Great Globe at Swanage is one of the largest stone spheres in the world and stands at Durlston Castle within Durlston Country Park, a 113-hectare (280-acre) country park and nature reserve. It is constructed of Portland stone, weighs about 40 tonnes and is 3 metres (10 ft) in diameter.

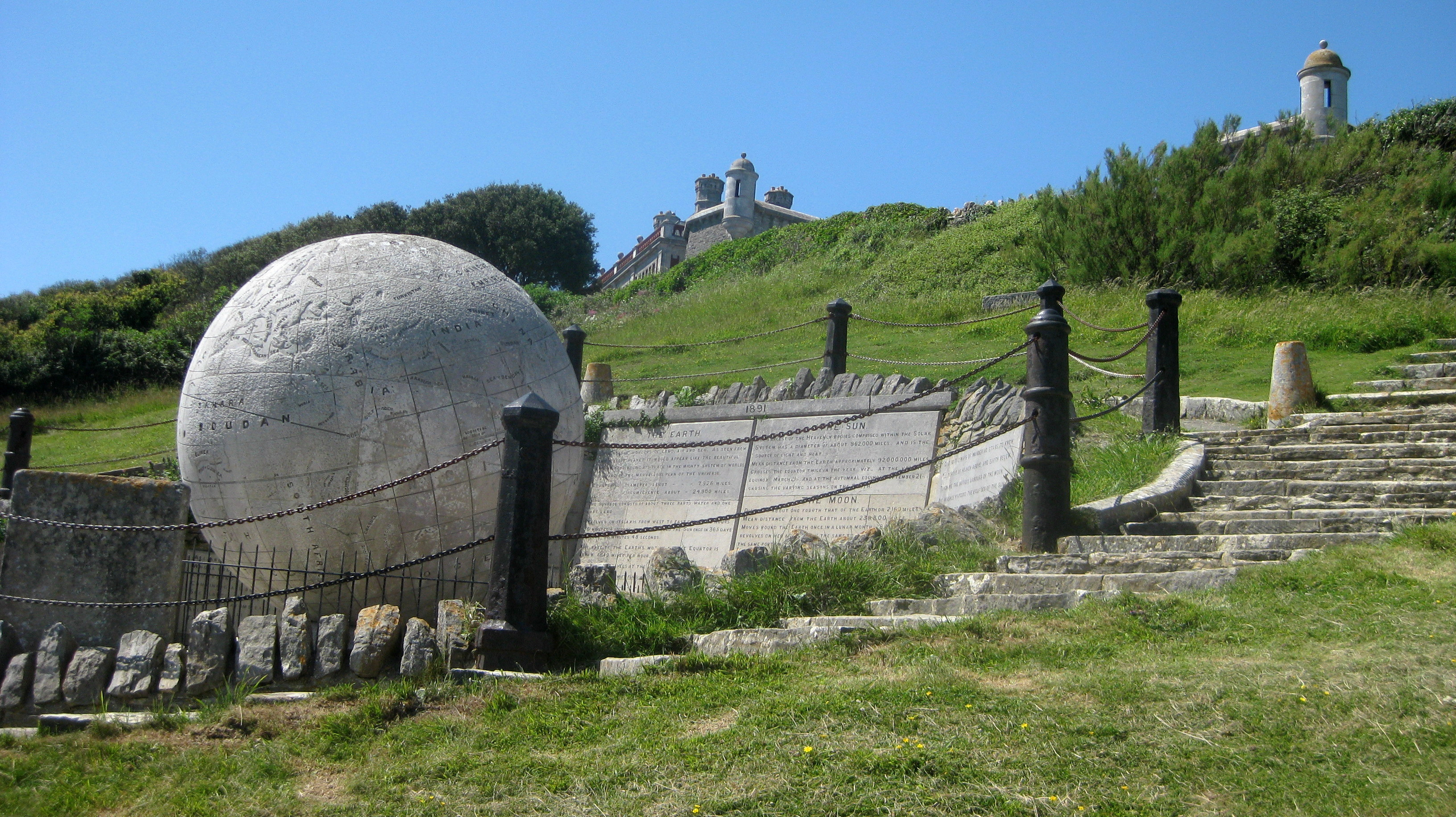
The Great Globe with Durlston Castle in the rear

== Location ==
South of Durlston Castle within the Estate grounds is the Great Globe.

== Description ==
Constructed in Greenwich in 1887 in Mowlem's stone-yard (whose founder John Mowlem had lived in Swanage), it was brought to Swanage by sea. The Globe, which is made of Portland stone, consists of 15 segments, with four stones for each of the lower three courses and three in the top-most course, the segments connected by granite dowels. It measures 10 feet (3.0 m) in diameter and weighs 40 tons. Its surface is carved in detail and lettered to show the continents, oceans and certain more specific areas of the world. It was erected by W.M. Hardy that year upon a platform cut into the solid rock of the hill some 136 feet (41 m) above sea level. Around the globe is a set of stone plaques carved with quotations from English, Roman poets and the Bible, and also various facts about the natural world. These were not completed until 1891. Eight large stone blocks around the globe represent the points of the compass. The globe is now surrounded by an iron fence.

The globe is a Grade II listed building, having been designated thus in 1983.
