= Anvil Point Lighthouse =

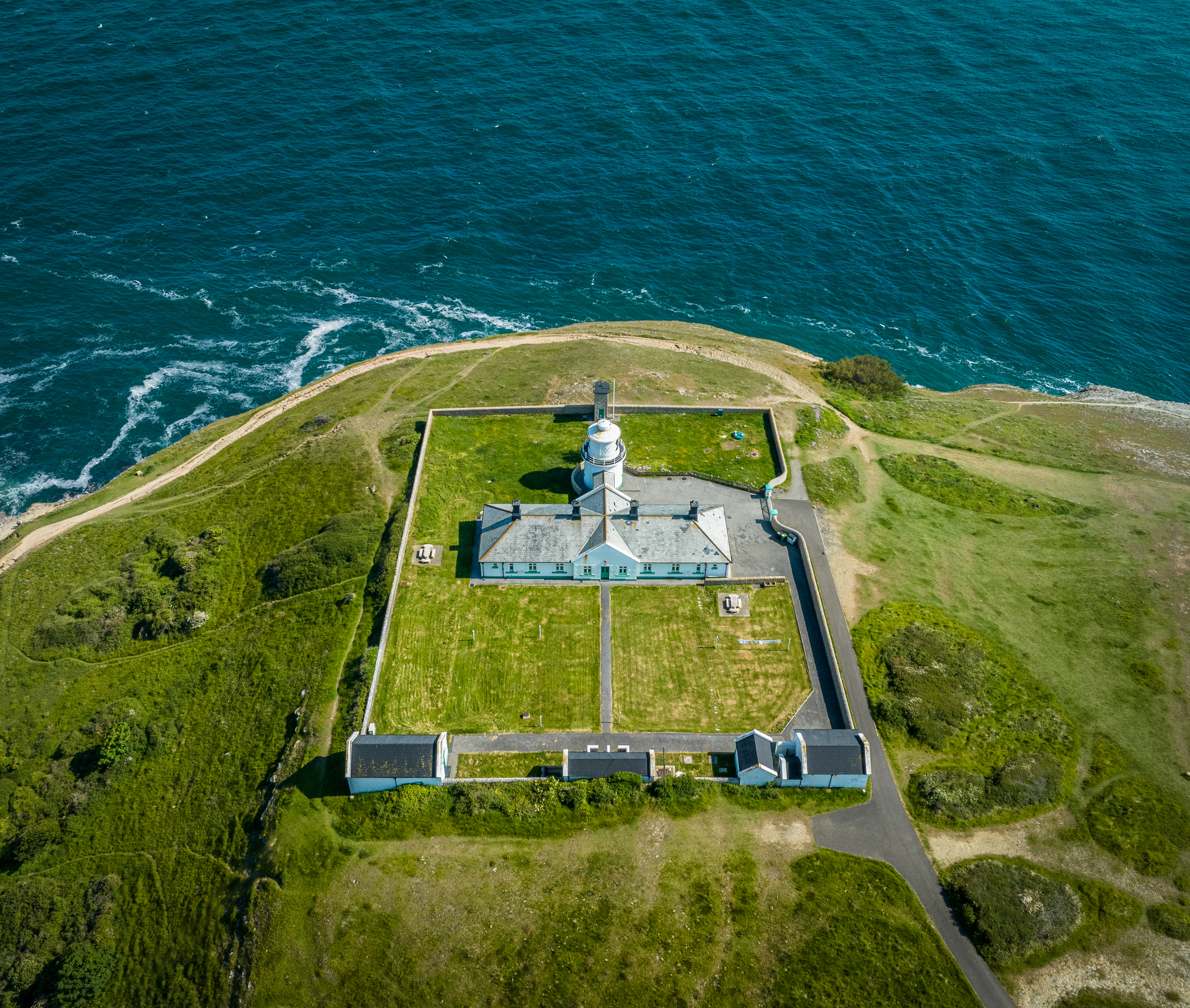
- Anvil Point Lighthouse from the north
- Location: Swanage; Dorset; England
- Coordinates: 50°35′30.8″N 1°57′35.3″W

Tower
- Constructed: 1881
- Construction: stone tower
- Automated: 1991
- Height: 12 m (39 ft)
- Shape: cylindrical tower with balcony and lantern
- Markings: white tower and lantern
- Operator: Trinity House

Listed Building – Grade II
- Official name: The lighthouse residential block, link building, sheds (now used as garage, engine house for lights and stores) and wall at Anvil Point
- Designated: 21 March 1983
- Reference no.: 1153160
- Fog signal: deactivated

Light
- Focal height: 45 m (148 ft)
- Lens: 250mm 6 panel fourth order rotating optic (original), 1 single tier LED lantern (current)
- Intensity: 1,080 candela
- Range: 9 nmi (17 km; 10 mi)
- Characteristic: Fl W 10s.

The Anvil Point Lighthouse is a fully automated lighthouse located at Durlston Country Park near Swanage in Dorset, England. It is owned by Trinity House.

The lighthouse, residential block and associated buildings are listed Grade II as part of a single entry on the National Heritage List for England.

== History ==
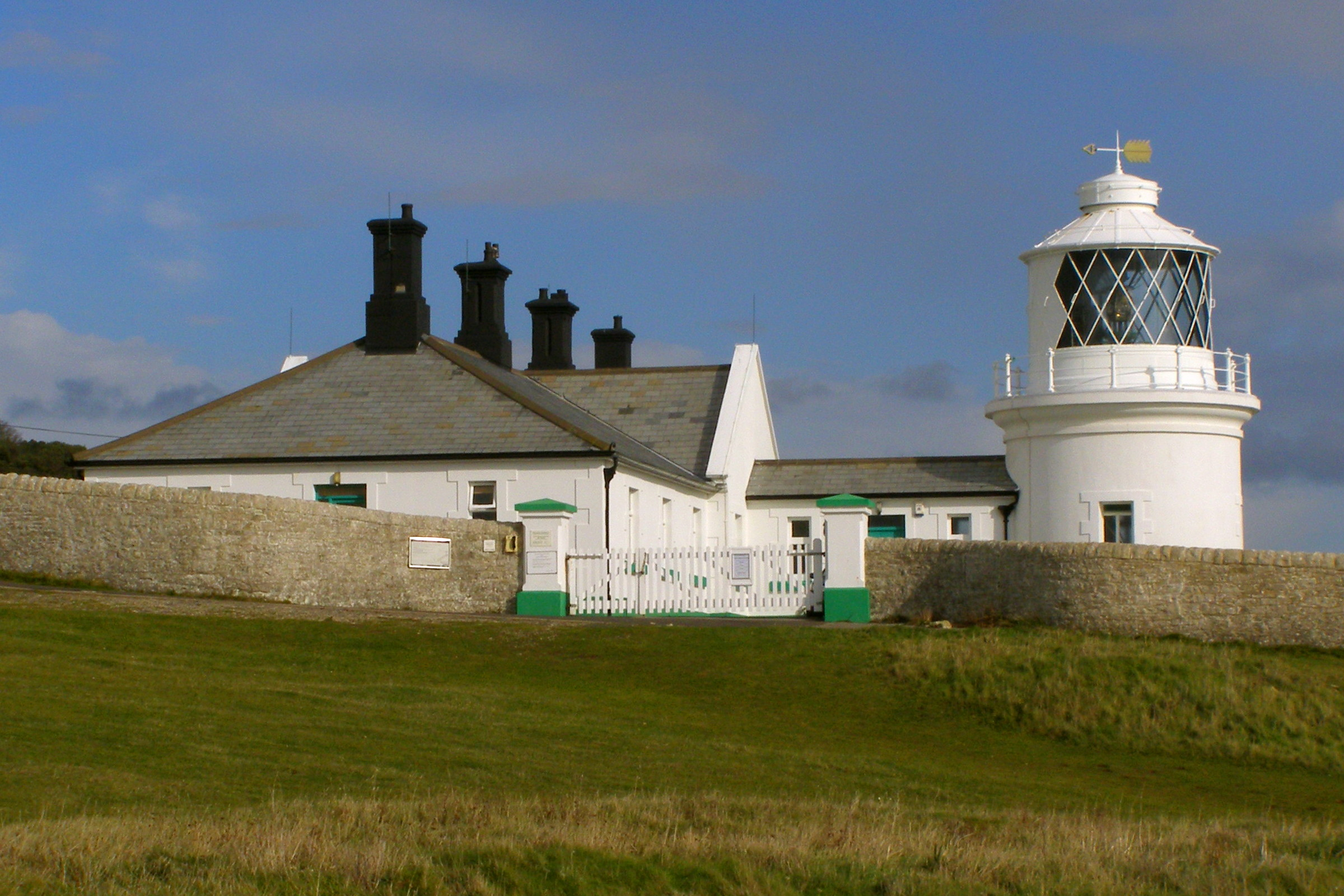
The lighthouse from the west

The lighthouse is built of local stone and was completed in 1881. It was opened by Joseph Chamberlain, the President of the Board of Trade. The lighthouse tower is twelve metres tall; the height of the light above the high-water mark is 45 m (148 ft). The light is positioned to give a waypoint for vessels passing along the English Channel coast.

Originally the light was illuminated by a Douglass multi-wick mineral oil burner, set within a large (first order) revolving 14-panel dioptric optic by Chance Brothers & Co. It was the first example of a significant new design of lighthouse optic, whereby (through the use of dense flint glass in the upper and lower portions) the height of a Fresnel lens could be significantly increased, dispensing with the need for additional reflective prisms above and below; the lenses alone stood 6 ft 2 in (1.88 m) high. The lamp was also specially designed for Anvil Point by James Douglass; it was subsequently used in other large coastal lighthouses, a series of international patents having been granted.

An explosive fog signal was established at the lighthouse in February 1894, which in foggy weather sounded once every ten minutes (later altered to every five minutes).

In the early 20th century a paraffin vapour burner (PVB) replaced the oil lamp.

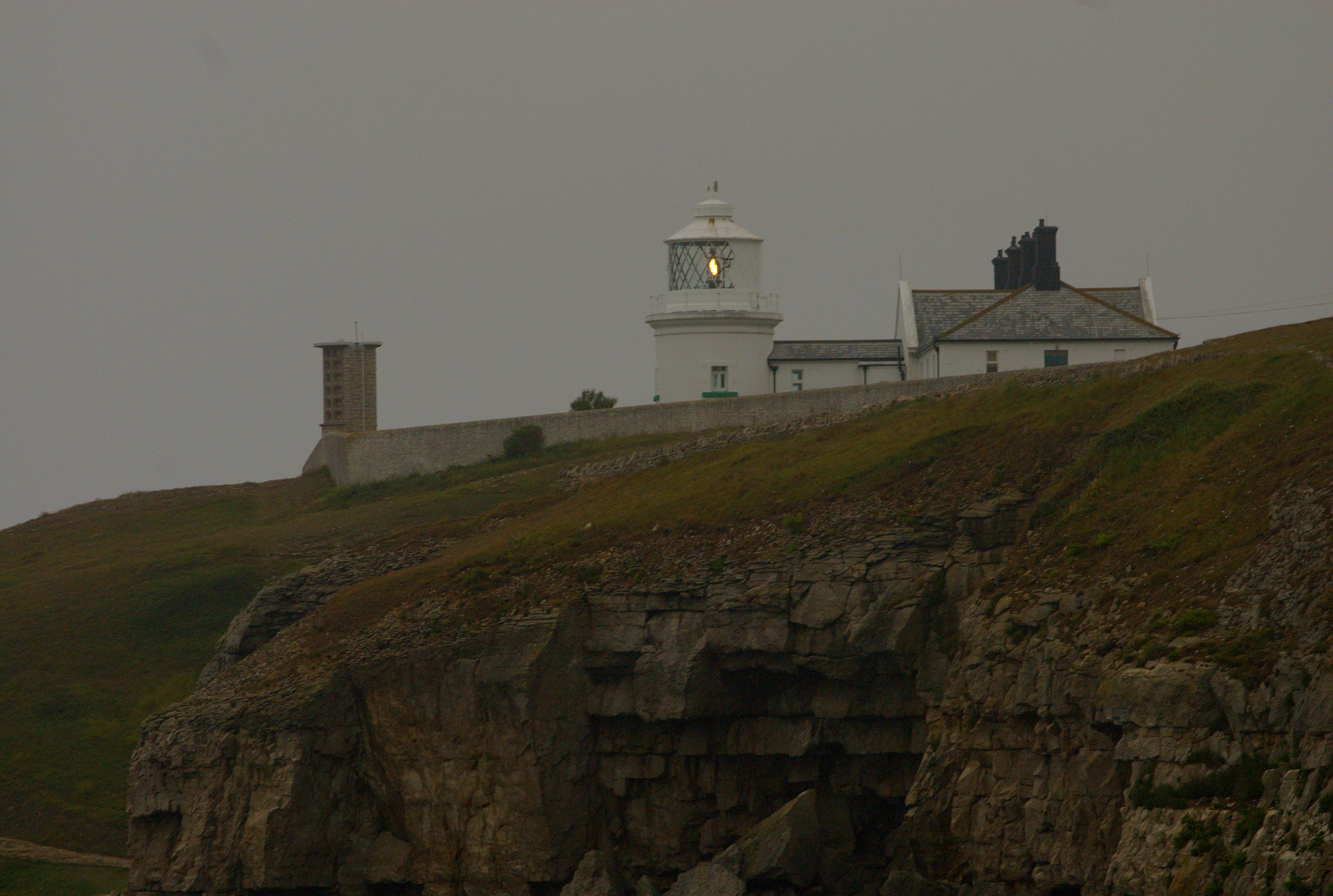
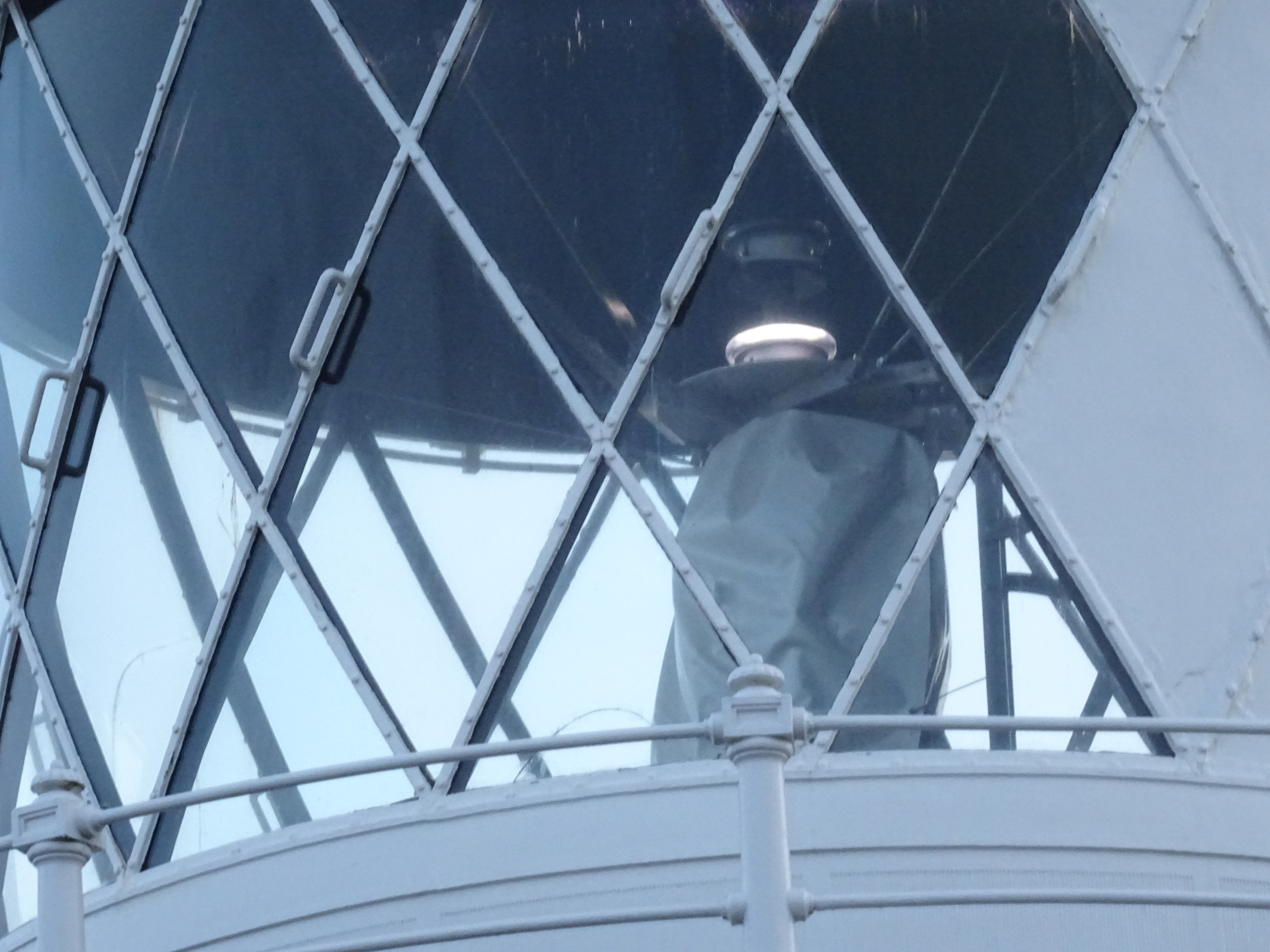
The lighthouse from the east to the right of the fog signal stack in 2009 (left). The LED light above the covered original lens in 2026 (right).

During 1960, the lighthouse was modernised and electrified (with a new lamp, powered by mains electricity, replacing the PVB). At the same time a smaller optic replaced the original lens array, which was removed and donated to the Science Museum. That same year, the five-minute explosive fog signal was replaced by a triple-frequency electric signal, sounded from a stack of thirty tannoy emitters positioned on the seaward edge of the compound directly in front of the lighthouse. In 1981 new automatic equipment was installed, but the fog signal was discontinued in 1988.

Anvil Point Lighthouse was fully automated on 31 May 1991 and is now monitored and controlled from the Trinity House Operations Control Centre at Harwich.

The lighthouse had a 1,000 watt filament lamp with an intensity of 500,000 candela. The light's range was about 19 nautical miles (35 km; 22 mi), but was reduced to 9 nautical miles (17 km; 10 mi) following a review of aids to navigation in 2010.

In 2012, an LED lamp was installed above the rotating Fresnel lens to serve as the main light at Anvil Point; its character is, as it was previously, a white flash every 10 seconds. (The old lens, though no longer in use, remains in place in the tower.)

== See also ==
- List of lighthouses in England
