= Swanage =

Town in Dorset, England

Coordinates: 50.608°N 1.960°W

- Town
- View of Swanage

- Coat of arms of Swanage

- Location within Dorset
- Population: 9,426 (2021 census)
- OS grid reference: SZ0278
- Civil parish: Swanage
- Unitary authority: Dorset
- Ceremonial county: Dorset
- Region: South West
- Country: England
- Sovereign state: United Kingdom
- Post town: Swanage
- Postcode district: BH19
- Dialling code: 01929
- Police: Dorset
- Fire: Dorset and Wiltshire
- Ambulance: South Western
- UK Parliament: South Dorset

Swanage (/ˈswɒnɪdʒ/) is a coastal town and civil parish in the south-east of Dorset, England. It lies at the eastern end of the Isle of Purbeck and is one of its two towns, approximately 6 1/4 miles (10 km) south of Poole and 25 miles (40 km) east of Dorchester. At the 2021 census, the civil parish had a population of 9,426. Nearby are Ballard Down and Old Harry Rocks, with Studland Bay and Poole Harbour to the north; within the parish are Durlston Bay and Durlston Country Park to the south of the town. The parish also includes the areas of Herston, just to the west of the town, and Durlston, just to the south.

The town, originally a small port and fishing village, flourished in the Victorian era, when it first became a significant quarrying port and later a seaside resort for the rich of the day. Today, the town remains a popular tourist resort, which is the town's primary industry; many thousands of visitors come to the town during the peak summer season, drawn by the bay's sandy beaches and other attractions.

During its history, the bay was listed variously as Swanawic, Swanwich and Sandwich, and only in more recent history as Swanage.

The town is located at the eastern end of the Jurassic Coast, a World Heritage Site. The town contains many listed buildings and two conservation areas – Swanage Conservation Area and Herston Conservation Area.

== History ==
While fishing is likely the town's oldest industry, quarrying has been important to the town and the local area since at least the first century AD. During the time of the Roman occupation this industry grew, with the distinctive Purbeck marble being used for decorative purposes in buildings as far away as London. When the Romans left Britain, quarrying largely ceased until the 12th century.

The town is first mentioned in historical texts in the Anglo-Saxon Chronicle of 877. It is stated as being the scene of a Danish naval disaster: "This year came the Danish army into Exeter from Wareham; whilst the navy sailed west about, until they met with a great mist at sea, and there perished one hundred and twenty ships at Swanwich." The Danish ships were driven by a storm onto Peveril Point, a shallow rocky reef outcropping from the southern end of Swanage Bay. A monument topped (historically incorrectly) by cannonballs was built in 1862 by John Mowlem at the southern end of the seafront promenade to mark this event - interpreted as great naval victory by King Alfred.

In the 12th century demand for Purbeck Marble grew once again. While Purbeck marble is not suited to external use, as it does not weather well, it is however strong and suitably decorative for use as internal columns. As such the stone was used in the construction of many large churches and cathedrals being built at the time.

In contrast to the decorative Purbeck marble, Purbeck limestone, or more commonly 'Purbeck stone', has been used in construction locally since the early days of quarrying on Purbeck. Its use is less well documented as it was taken for granted as the default construction materials in the area. However, the arrival of more modern quarrying techniques in the 17th century resulted in an increase in production. The Great Fire of London in 1666 led to a period of large-scale reconstruction in the city, and Purbeck stone was extensively used for paving. It was in this time that stone first started being loaded upon ships directly from the Swanage seafront; before this time quarried stone had been first transported to Poole for shipping.

The idea that Swanage could become a tourist destination was first encouraged by a local MP William Morton Pitt in the early 19th century, who converted a mansion in the town into a luxury hotel. The hotel is noted for having been visited in 1833 by the (then) Princess Victoria, later to become queen. The building was later renamed the Royal Victoria Hotel, now the building has been converted into flats and a bar and nightclub in the left and right wings respectively.

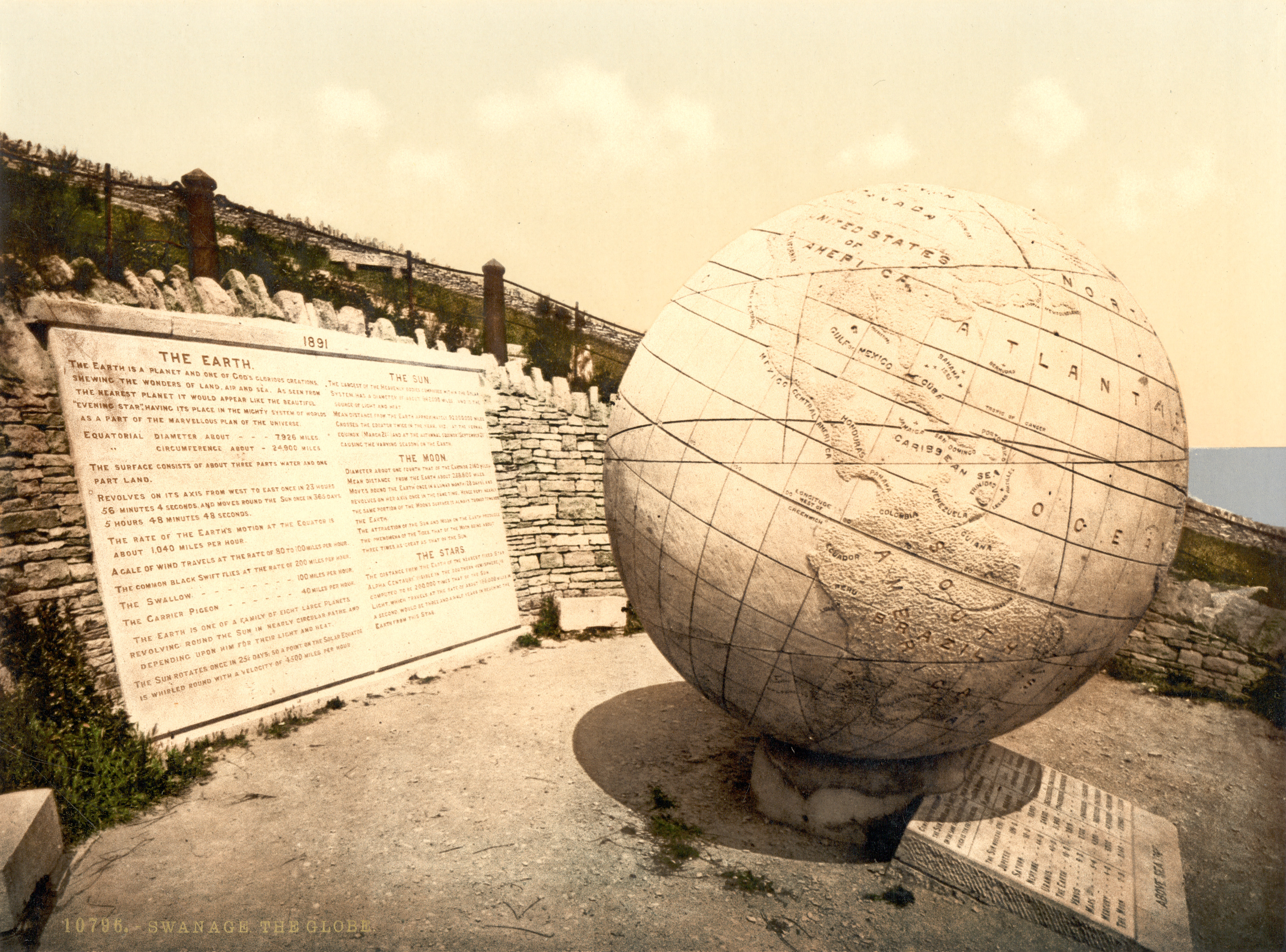
Globe at Durlston Country Park

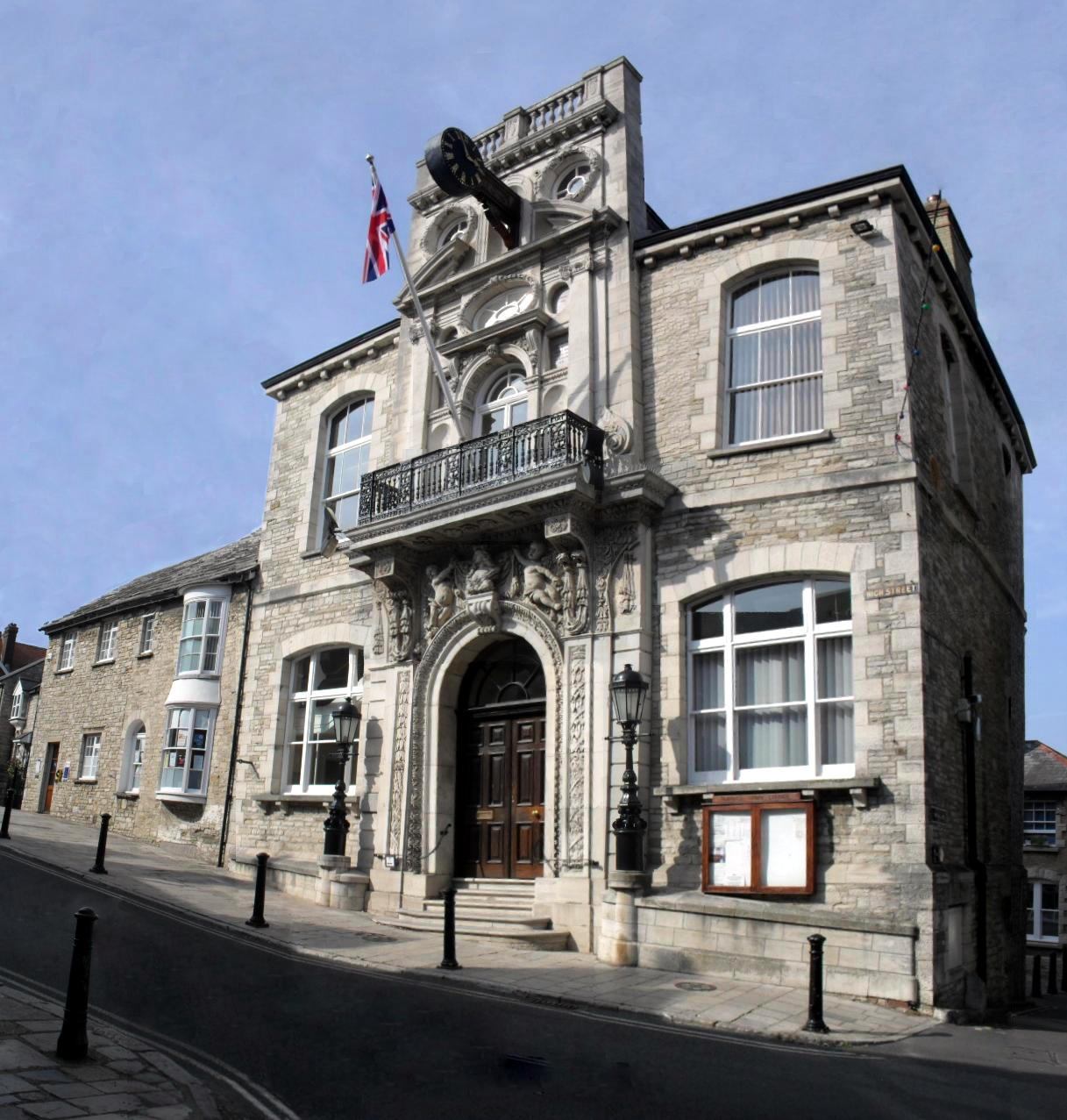
Swanage Town Hall

=== Mowlem and Burt – the Victorian era ===
The town's greatest prominence came during the Victorian period. John Mowlem (1788–1868), a Swanage resident, became a successful builder in London, creating the Mowlem construction company, which still existed as recently as 2006, when it was acquired by another company, Carillion.

John Mowlem made his business in London by importing stone into the city from around the country, including Purbeck limestone. Through this process, many relics and monuments were brought from London to Swanage in the 19th century by Mowlem and his nephew George Burt (1816–1894) who took over the business when Mowlem retired. It is said that these items brought from London were used as ballast for the empty vessels which transported the Purbeck stone to London.

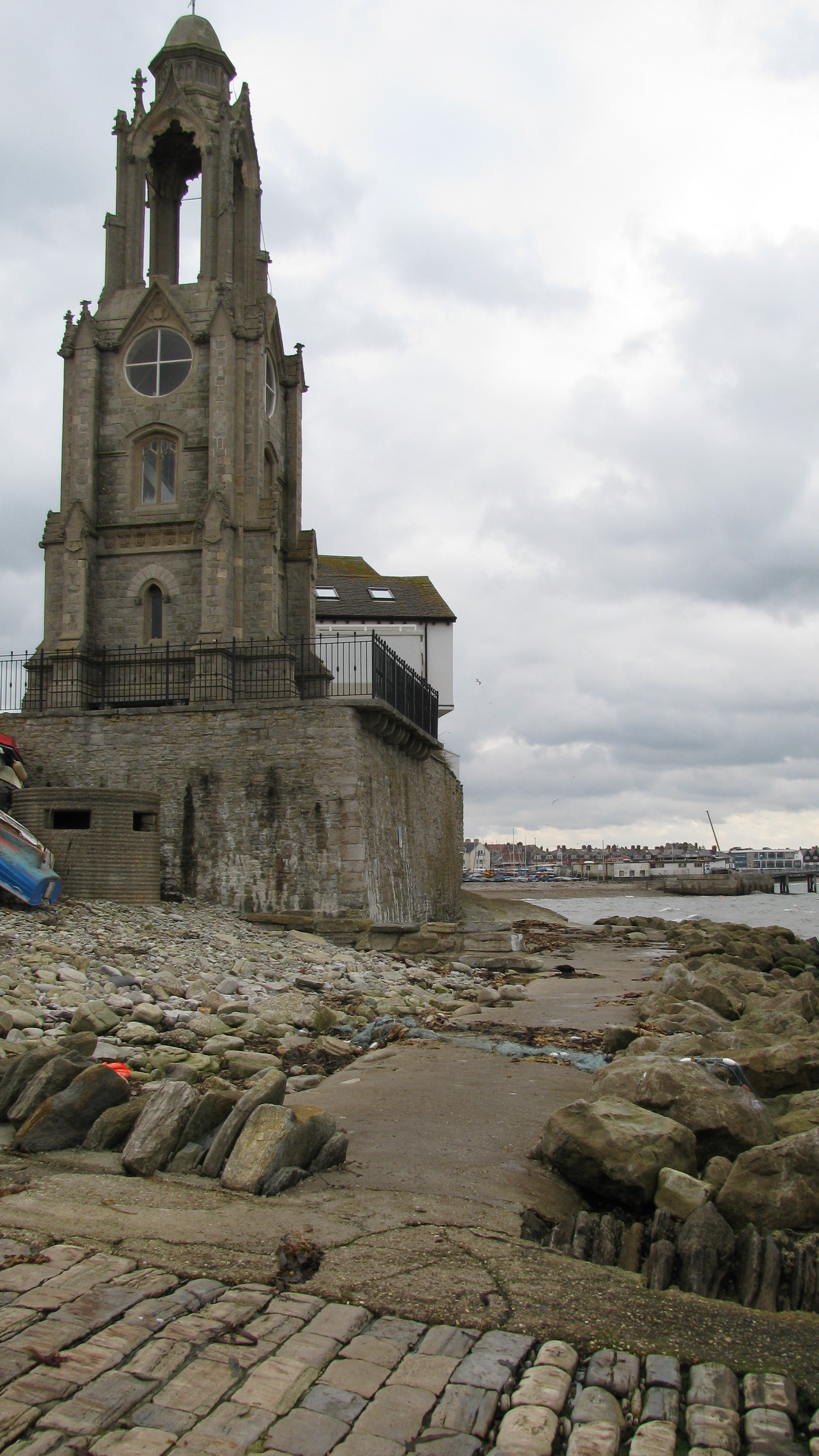
The Wellington clock tower in Swanage, relocated from London Bridge

These include the big clock tower near Peveril Point. The clock tower, commemorating the Duke of Wellington, designed by Arthur Ashpitel, was built in 1854 at the southern approach to the old London Bridge. Within 10 years it became an obstruction to traffic on the busy bridge and had to be removed. It was re-erected 1867–68 on its present site at the southern end of the bay on the sea front. A further item transported from London to Swanage is the 1860 façade of the Mercers' Hall, that was used as the façade of the Swanage Town Hall, which was designed by G. R. Crickmay (1830–1907) of Weymouth, and built during the early 1880s. Immediately behind the town hall, but pre-dating it, is the Swanage lock-up. Dating from 1803, it is a scheduled monument.

Mowlem and Burt were highly influential in the development of the town, taking an active interest in their town of birth into retirement. Between them they were responsible for the building of much of the town's infrastructure, including the town's first pier, the Mowlem Institute (a reading room), the first gas and water works, and the development of the Durlston estate and Country Park, at the southern end of the town. The Great Globe which can be found slightly south of Durlston Castle, both also designed by Crickmay, in the Durlston Country Park was completed by George Burt in 1887. It is made up of 15 sections of stone and joined with granite dowels. The Great Globe weighs 40 long tons (41 tonnes) and is 10 feet (3 m) in diameter. Burt was responsible for the erection of the first civic memorial to Prince Albert, the Prince Albert Memorial, in 1862.

Newton Manor House on the High Street was a 17th-century farmhouse, remodelled in the 18th and 19th centuries. For some centuries the house and estate belonged to the Cockram family. In c1876 it was bought by Sir John Charles Robinson, Director of the Victoria and Albert Museum.

Swanage Lighthouse was built in 1880, on the clifftop at Anvil Point, not far away from Durlston Castle.

The railways were introduced to the town in 1885 with the encouragement of Burt by the London and South Western Railway Company. By this time the town was becoming a popular resort destination for the wealthy, noted for its fine weather and clean air. The town previously had been fairly cut off due to its valley location, but the introduction of the railway made the town much more accessible to visitors, with direct services running from London. However, the greatest increase in visitors came with the building of the second 'new' pier in 1895, built primarily for use by pleasure steamers.

=== The Great War to the present ===
The town enjoyed several decades quietly being successful as a seaside resort. The First World War left few physical marks on the town; however, during the Second World War gun emplacements and pillboxes were built at spots along the shoreline at the southern end of the bay. The town also received bomb damage during the Second World War, with 20 people killed. The town and other nearby villages are noted for playing a part in the development of radar.

After the Second World War the town, like many other seaside resorts and indeed the country at large, suffered a recession with few people able to spare the money for holidaying. In 1972 the Swanage branch line of the railway was closed by British Rail as part of larger network-wide cutbacks. A group of local enthusiasts formed a charitable organisation with the purpose of restoring and preserving the branch line and steam and diesel locomotives to run along it, forming the Swanage Railway.

Through the years Swanage has suffered from flooding, with severe flooding occurring as recently as 1990. In 1993 a large-scale flood alleviation scheme was completed, ending in the banjo-shaped 'new jetty' outletting rainwater. This in itself created a new problem, disturbing the natural northward drift of sand up the bay, with a buildup on the southern side and reduction of sand on the northern. This reduction of sand levels exposed the foundations of parts of the seawall threatening to damage it. As a result, the beach was improved in 2005–06 by construction of new greenheart timber groynes and the placement of 90,000 m^{3} (3,200,000 cu ft) of sand as beach nourishment.

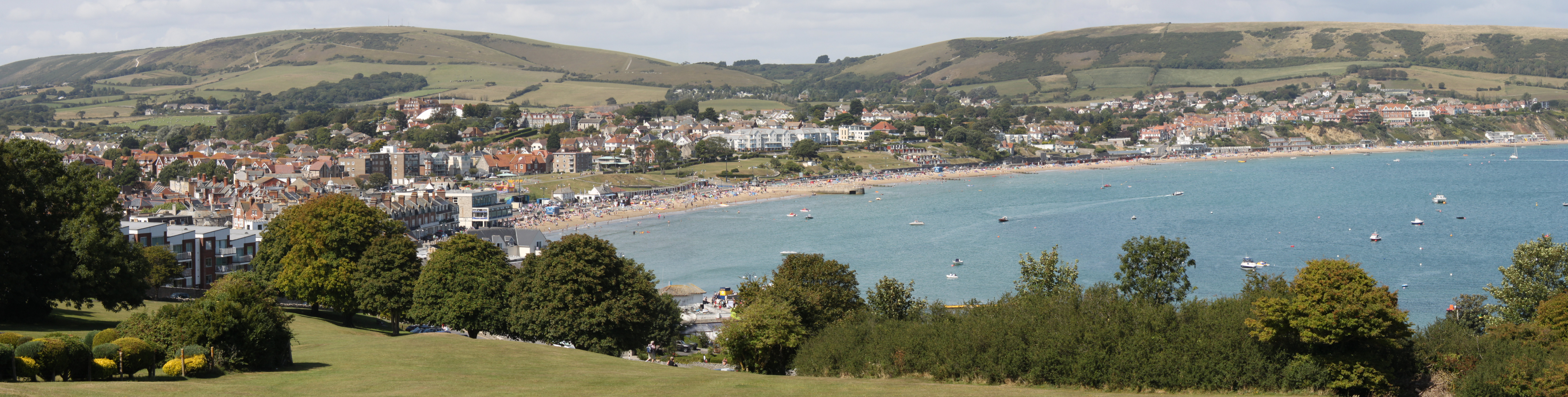
Panorama of Swanage, looking north-west from Peveril Point

== Governance ==
Local governance and service provision is provided by Swanage Town Council (based at Swanage Town Hall) and the unitary authority Dorset Council. Swanage is represented within Dorset council by two councillors from the Swanage Ward, William Trite and Gary Suttle of the Conservative Party. This changed with a local government reorganisation in 2019 from a two-tier structure (Purbeck District Council and Dorset County Council), to a single-tier unitary authority (Dorset Council) covering rural Dorset. In terms of UK parliamentary representation, Swanage falls within the constituency of South Dorset and is represented since 2024 by Lloyd Hatton of Labour.

=== Town council ===
Swanage Town Council is the parish authority based in the historic town hall in the High Street. Services provided by the town council include – "sport and recreational facilities, beach, tourist information and promotion of tourists, caravan parks, off-street car parks, public conveniences, cemeteries, allotments". The town council consists of twelve elected councillors, elected from two electoral wards (Swanage North and Swanage south), who each serve 4-year terms (after an initial 5-year term from 2019 due to local government re-organisation). As of the 2019 local elections, the political makeup of the town council is 10 Conservative councillors (57% of total votes) and 2 Labour councillors (23% of total votes). These councillors appoint a chairman to act as the town mayor, currently Cllr Avril Harris. Working groups and committees are formed for specific concerns and functions such as transport, capital projects and general operations. The council employs around 30 staff to deliver its services who are managed by the town clerk and various sub managers.

== Geography and geology ==
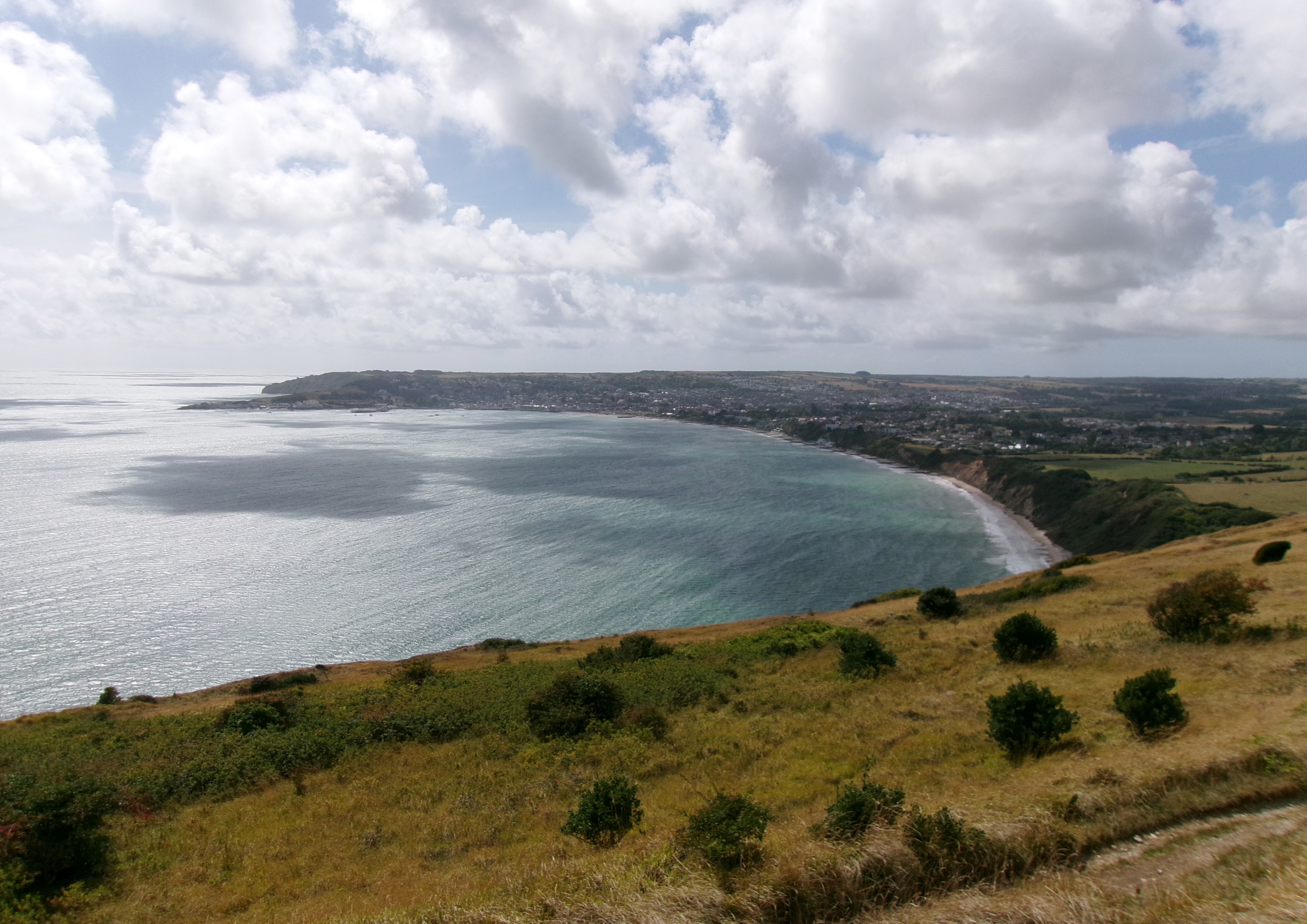
Swanage Bay

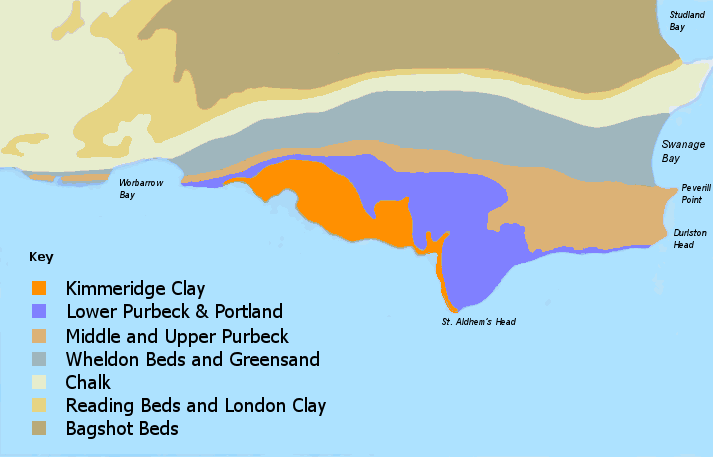
Simplified geology map of the Swanage area

Swanage faces to the east Swanage Bay in Dorset on the south coast of England. The bay is at the eastern end of the Isle of Purbeck, approximately 6 miles (10 km) south of Poole and 25 miles (40 km) east of Dorchester. The northern headland of the bay is formed of chalk, the southern of Purbeck Limestone, with softer primarily Wealden clays forming the bay and valley in which the town is sited. The Purbeck limestone was extensively quarried with several sites to the south west showing evidence of former quarries, particularly Tilly Whim Caves and Dancing Ledge, a man-made rock shelf used for loading ships. Natural erosion has formed stacks along and at the end of the northern headland, in particular the notable Old Harry Rocks. In part through the process of quarrying, fossils from the dinosaur age have been discovered in the local rock, and the coastline up to and including Swanage Bay has been included in the Jurassic Coast World Heritage Site.

=== Climate ===
As with the rest of the British Isles Swanage experiences a maritime climate with warm (but not hot) summers and cool winters. Within this climate zone, Swanage's coastal location ensures a smaller range in annual temperature than in places further inland. The Met Office operates a weather station at the town, and temperature extremes recorded range from −9.4 °C (15.1 °F) in January 1963 up to 33.1 °C (91.6 °F) during June 2026. Rainfall typically peaks in winter, and is at its lowest during summer. The town's position on an east-facing bay provides it some protection from the prevailing southwesterly winds.

Climate data for Swanage (1991–2020 normals, extremes 1931-present)
Month	Jan	Feb	Mar	Apr	May	Jun	Jul	Aug	Sep	Oct	Nov	Dec	Year
Record high °C (°F)	14.8 (58.6)	16.2 (61.2)	19.8 (67.6)	23.2 (73.8)	27.8 (82.0)	33.1 (91.6)	30.2 (86.4)	31.6 (88.9)	27.7 (81.9)	22.6 (72.7)	17.2 (63.0)	15.0 (59.0)	33.1 (91.6)
Mean daily maximum °C (°F)	9.0 (48.2)	8.9 (48.0)	10.5 (50.9)	12.8 (55.0)	15.7 (60.3)	18.3 (64.9)	20.5 (68.9)	20.6 (69.1)	18.6 (65.5)	15.5 (59.9)	12.2 (54.0)	9.8 (49.6)	14.4 (57.9)
Daily mean °C (°F)	6.5 (43.7)	6.3 (43.3)	7.7 (45.9)	9.6 (49.3)	12.4 (54.3)	15.1 (59.2)	17.1 (62.8)	17.3 (63.1)	15.4 (59.7)	12.7 (54.9)	9.5 (49.1)	7.2 (45.0)	11.4 (52.5)
Mean daily minimum °C (°F)	4.0 (39.2)	3.7 (38.7)	4.7 (40.5)	6.3 (43.3)	9.1 (48.4)	11.7 (53.1)	13.6 (56.5)	13.8 (56.8)	12.1 (53.8)	9.7 (49.5)	6.7 (44.1)	4.5 (40.1)	8.4 (47.1)
Record low °C (°F)	−9.4 (15.1)	−7.8 (18.0)	−6.7 (19.9)	−2.6 (27.3)	−0.6 (30.9)	3.4 (38.1)	5.0 (41.0)	5.6 (42.1)	2.8 (37.0)	−2.2 (28.0)	−4.5 (23.9)	−6.5 (20.3)	−9.4 (15.1)
Average precipitation mm (inches)	95.2 (3.75)	67.3 (2.65)	58.5 (2.30)	52.1 (2.05)	45.7 (1.80)	50.9 (2.00)	49.5 (1.95)	54.9 (2.16)	63.3 (2.49)	98.4 (3.87)	108.2 (4.26)	108.1 (4.26)	852.7 (33.57)
Average precipitation days (≥ 1.0 mm)	13.2	10.9	9.8	9.2	8.0	7.6	7.8	8.3	8.7	12.6	14.0	13.9	124.0
Mean monthly sunshine hours	66.5	88.4	134.7	188.1	222.0	226.9	236.0	213.1	167.3	119.8	81.2	61.0	1,805.5
Source 1: Met Office
Source 2: Starlings Roost Weather

== Demographics ==
At the 2021 census, the civil parish had a population of 9,426 people in 4,512 households. The Office for National Statistics also defines a contiguous built-up area for Swanage, excluding rural parts of the parish, which had a population of 9,110 in 2021.

Census population of Swanage parish
Census	Population	Female	Male	Households	Source
1921	7,106				
1931	6,277				
1951	6,866				
1961	8,120				
1971	8,560				
1981	8,650				
1991	9,520				
2001	10,124	5,416	4,708	4,441	
2011	9,601	4,980	4,621	4,504	
2021	9,426	4,916	4,510	4,512	

== Economy ==
Swanage's primary sources of employment are wholesale and retail trade (including mechanics), health and social work, and accommodation and food service activities. The town has a tourism industry; however, the demand level is highly seasonal, and as such people looking for permanent work may have to commute to nearby towns such as Poole and Bournemouth.

The town centre has a few medium-sized outlets for major retailers, a collection of local retailers, a number of cafes, bars, restaurants and pubs. The seafront has two amusement arcades, several ice cream outlets, fish restaurants and cafes. The town also has a number of successful small-scale cottage industries.

There is a brickworks on the outskirts of the town that uses the Wealden Clay found in the valley for producing bricks, and quarrying still continues to the south.

=== Tourism ===
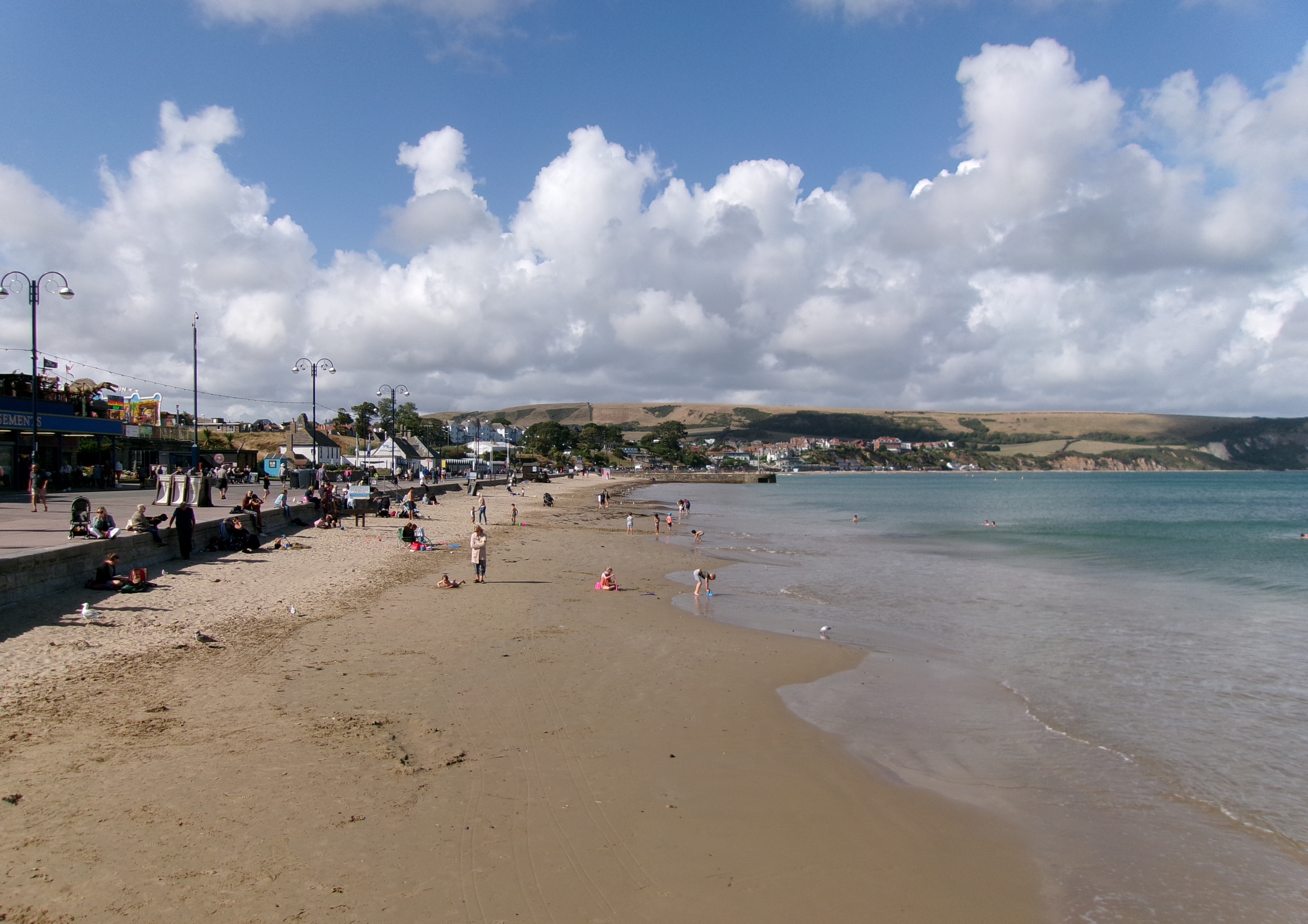
Swanage beach

During the peak summer season many people are drawn by the town's beautiful setting, the beach and other attractions. The town has numerous hotels and guest rooms though the number (particularly of hotels) has reduced slightly in recent years. Swanage has a gently sloping white sand beach which is sheltered and generally calm. The beach is well served by local businesses providing refreshments and services. For hire are deck chairs, boats, pedalos and general watersports equipment. There are amusement arcades and parks.

Besides the beach, other local attractions include the restored Swanage Steam Railway, the Victorian Swanage Pier, and Durlston Country Park National Nature Reserve. The town may also be used a base from which to visit other nearby areas of interest, such as Corfe Castle.

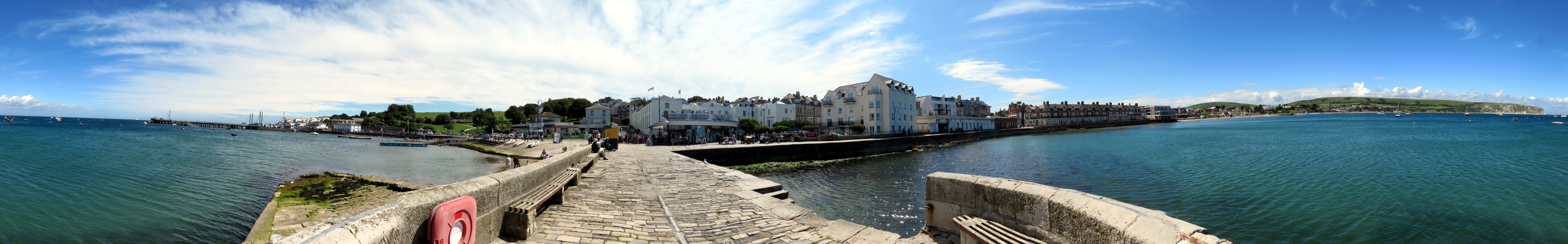

== Culture ==
As a small town there are no large cultural institutions based in the town, though there are a number of small clubs and groups, including the Swanage Town Band formed in the late 19th century. The largest facility in the town is the Mowlem Theatre, on the site of the former Mowlem Institute, opened in 1967. Performing a dual role as a 400-seat theatre and cinema, the complex also hosts a bar and restaurant and a small collection of shops. Typically there are around 200 film showings and 60–100 nights of live theatre.

Swanage has a detached flight of the Air Training Corps which regularly partakes in activities around the town, including charitable collections, training exercises and parades. 2185 (Swanage) DF is attached to 2185 (Wareham) Squadron ATC as its parent unit.

The town has been twinned with Rüdesheim am Rhein in Germany since 1986.

=== Festivals and events ===
The town hosts a number of annual festivals and events. In the summer months there is a carnival week which includes a procession of floats and dancers and several firework displays, and many other attractions and small events including live music from various bands from all over Southern England, races and a regatta.

The railway used to have special Thomas the Tank Engine themed events, and other special services.

The town also hosts successful festivals, which attract more than a purely local audience. These include a jazz festival, a folk festival, a blues festival, and there are plans for a food festival in the future.

New Year's Eve has traditionally been a big event for Swanage, with the town drawing more people from surrounding areas, and people travelling considerable distances to attend. In part this has been due to attendance by employees of the nearby Wytch Farm oil processing facility. While the popularity of the event has waned somewhat from its peak in the early 1990s, with fewer oil employees in the area, there is still a large gathering each year, spilling out into the square and High Street at midnight. It is a long-standing tradition in Swanage for people to dress up for New Year's Eve to add to the atmosphere. There is no specific fancy dress "theme".

== Media ==
Local news and television programmes are provided by BBC South and ITV Meridian. Television signals are received from Rowridge transmitting station.

Local radio stations are BBC Radio Solent on 96.1 FM, Heart South on 102.3 FM, Greatest Hits Radio South on 105.8 FM, Nation Radio South Coast on 106.6 FM and Purbeck Coast FM, a community based radio station that broadcast on 101.2 FM.

The town is served by these local newspapers:

- The Swanage & Wareham Advertiser
- The Purbeck Gazette
- Swanage News
- Dorset Echo

== Churches ==
There are several church congregations in Swanage, many of which meet at sites of historic interest. St Mary's Anglican Church was rebuilt from 1860 and Swanage Methodist Church was built in 1886. There are also three more Anglican churches, Emmanuel Baptist Church, a Quakers' meeting house, Roman Catholic, Salvation Army and United Reformed Church. All the churches are part of the ecumenical group known as "Churches Together in Swanage and District" which also extends to churches within Langton Matravers, Kingston and Worth Matravers.

The town also has the "Old Stable", a Christian-led community centre in the town centre.

== Transport ==
=== Railway ===
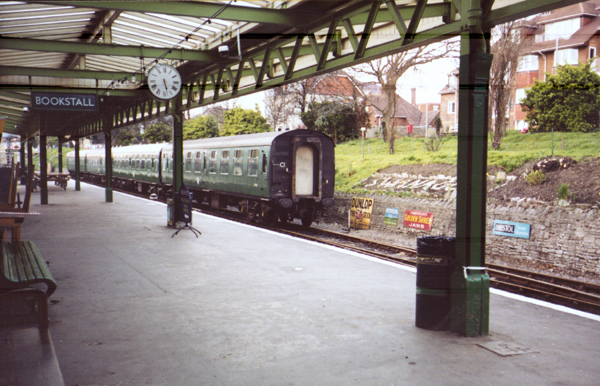
Swanage railway station is a terminus of the Swanage Railway

The nearest main line railway station to Swanage is Wareham, with South Western Railway services westward to Dorchester South and Weymouth and eastwards towards Poole, Bournemouth, Southampton Central and London Waterloo.

Swanage Railway is a heritage steam railway, which operates for most of the year; the town is served by Swanage railway station on this line. In February 2013, it obtained a government grant of £1.47 million to reintroduce regular services to the main line at Wareham. The physical connection between the Swanage Railway and the main line has been restored, but is currently used only during the summer months. In 2023, a regular four day per week service from Wareham was restored between April and September. Limited ferry services also run between Poole Quay and Swanage Pier. These are used by Swanage residents for shopping trips to Poole's large shopping centre and also by tourists in Poole for day trips into Swanage.

To avoid the narrow A351 through Corfe Castle village and parking in Swanage, a park and ride facility operates at Norden, with connections into Swanage provided by Swanage Railway steam trains or buses on routes 30 and 40. Together with Swanage Railway trains from Wareham, boat trips from Poole and the scenic bus route from Bournemouth, this provides an range of public transport options with low carbon footprint for visiting the town.

=== Roads ===
Swanage is accessible by main road either through Wareham and its bypass or via the Sandbanks Ferry which provides a shorter route to Bournemouth. There is a minor road connecting Swanage to East Lulworth via Corfe Castle but this passes through a military firing range and is closed during firing exercises.

=== Buses and coaches ===
Bus services are provided predominantly by Morebus; key routes include:

- 40 runs between Swanage and Poole
- 30 between Swanage and Weymouth (summer time only)
- 50 runs between Swanage and Bournemouth via the Sandbanks Ferry.

Double-deck open top buses are used on the Poole and Bournemouth to Swanage routes in the summer months. The buses on these routes are branded as Purbeck Breezers. The Bournemouth to Swanage route was voted one of Britain's top three scenic bus routes in 2018.

National Express Coaches operates a daily return coach service from Swanage to London.

== Education ==
=== Current ===
Swanage has four primary schools covering academic years 1–6; St Mary's Catholic, St Mark's CE, St George's CE, and Swanage Primary School (also known by its location of Mount Scar.)

Swanage has one secondary school, The Swanage School.

The town has a library in the town centre housed in a distinctive 1960s octagonal glass and Purbeck Stone building.

A small museum (the Swanage Museum & Heritage Centre) with artefacts and displays recounting the town and surrounding area's history is located at the square on the seafront. The museum had previously been housed in the historical Tithe Barn building; however, mounting maintenance costs forced the relocation of much of the collection to the new site, with the remainder in storage.

=== Former ===
Until 2013 schools in Purbeck District operated as part of a three-tier comprehensive pyramid system. Under this system, the Purbeck School in Wareham was fed by the various middle schools in the Purbeck district, including the former Swanage Middle School on the edge of the town at Herston. These in turn were fed by the district's primary schools. However, in November 2010 a move to change to a two-tier system was approved following a proposal from Dorset County Council in May of that year. This culminated in the closure of Purbeck's Middle Schools in September 2013. As a further result the district's primary schools, including the 4 in Swanage are required to accommodate children through two additional school years. These cover years 1–6, with children moving on to secondary education from year 7 onwards.

Concern from parents and teachers following the original announcement of these plans prompted the formation of the Education Swanage group, who put together a proposal to form a free school in the town to provide secondary education. Having successfully completed several rounds of reviews with the Department for Education, Education Swanage's proposal was finally accepted in October 2011. "The Swanage School" opened in September 2013 temporarily located at Harrow House, an international language school within the town until the new building became ready. Pupils moved to the new building in Easter 2014.

Harrow House, a large former private language school in the town catered for foreign pupils. The school, founded in 1969 had a large white pressurised dome which serves as a sports hall, which was visible from some distance. The school closed during the pandemic of 2020 and did not reopen.

Adjacent to Harrow House was Purbeck View School, owned by Cambian Education. This school catered to the needs of autistic children and teenagers and provides boarding facilities. Following a number of issue with Ofsted inspections and reducing the number of young people served the school finally closed in August 2023.

There was a Swanage Grammar School between 1929 and 1974.

== Public services ==
The town is served by a small fire station provided by Dorset & Wiltshire Fire and Rescue Service and located centrally within the town. Swanage Police Station, originally opened in 1899 and was operated by Dorset Police, before being closed in November 2012.

Swanage Hospital is a community hospital provided by Dorset Healthcare with an accompanying ambulance station provided by the South Western Ambulance Service. The hospital has a minor injuries unit, providing basic emergency care from 8 a.m. to 8 p.m., inpatient and outpatient departments, an operating theatre, radiography, physiotherapy and occupational therapy departments. Swanage Medical Practice provides GP services.

Given the coastal location, the town is also served by Swanage Lifeboat Station, an RNLI lifeboat station, a HM Coastguard post, and a National Coastwatch Institution station.

== Sport and recreation ==
Swanage is represented in a number of sports, including football, rugby, cricket, croquet, hockey, sailing and rowing.

Swanage Town and Herston F.C., who play in the Dorset Premier League have a dedicated football ground with limited covered seating and associated social club. Swanage & Wareham Rugby Club, who play in the South West 1 East League are based in neighbouring Wareham. Swanage and Wareham Hockey Club have Ladies', Men's and Mixed teams. The Ladies play in the Channel 1 and 2 West Leagues, the Men in the Hampshire League Division 4 and the Mixed team in the Mixed Division 5. Swanage Cricket Club has teams in both the Dorset Saturday and Sunday leagues each in Division 1. The town's Croquet Club is also based at the Cricket Club.

The sea cliffs and quarries to the west of Swanage provide excellent venues for rock climbing.

The surrounding areas make for excellent walking and as such the town is a popular destination for hikers who use the town as base. Many beauty spots are in walkable distance, while never being too far from refreshment. The town is on the Dorset Coast Path with attractive cliffs walks to Old Harry Rocks and Studland to the north, and Durlston Head and Lulworth Cove to the south and west.

=== Parks ===
Swanage has a King George's Field near the centre of town in memorial to King George V, which includes large playing fields, as well as skate park facilities and a hi-tech play area, both funded by community groups. There are plans also for the building of a new sports pavilion at the park, to replace the previous building which had been demolished due to safety concerns. Parks in the town centre include Prince Albert Gardens, where the Prince Albert Memorial is now located, and the Recreation Ground, where the war memorial and bandstand are located, and where a memorial to Trevor Chadwick is located.

Towards the eastern end of town is Days Park, which includes a playing field, play area and gardens.

=== Water sport ===
Swanage bay provides a well sheltered environment for a range of watersports, including swimming, kayaking, canoeing, sailing, windsurfing and jetskiing.

Scuba diving takes place under the piers and at nearby coastal wrecks. Swanage is considered by many to be the home of British scuba diving. It is one of the most popular sea water training sites for dive schools and clubs to take trainee divers due to the sheltered conditions within the bay. The dive school on the pier was the first dive school in Great Britain.

Swanage Sailing club was established in 1935 and is located immediately south of the pier.

Swanage Sea Rowing Club, formed in 2001 has been highly successful and currently has over 100 members and four Cornish pilot gigs of its own, funded through donations. Competitions take place at regattas of which the club attends several per year, including the World Pilot Gig Championships held on the Isles of Scilly.

There are two public swimming pools, one at the Swanage Bay View Holiday Home Park and another at Ulwell Caravan Park. Both offer swimming lessons and aquarobic sessions.

== Notable residents ==
Between 1934 and 1936, Swanage was the home of artist Paul Nash. He worked on the Shell Guide to Dorset and produced a considerable number of paintings and photographs during this period. Also staying in Swanage at this time was the surrealist Eileen Agar, with whom Nash collaborated. In 1936 Nash wrote an essay entitled "Swanage or Seaside Surrealism", in which he described the town as having something "of a dream image where things are so often incongruous and slightly frightening in their relation to time or place."

The novelist Charles Chadwick (1932–2025) was born in Swanage.

Artist and writer Philip Sugden was born and raised in Swanage. He is known for his drawings and paintings of India and Tibet, and his books entitled Visions From the Fields of Merit and White Lotus.

The Canadian poet, novelist and painter P. K. Page was born in Swanage, Dorset on 23 November 1916. In 1919, she left with her family for Canada. In 1954, Page won the Canadian Governor General's Award for poetry and in 1977 was made an Officer to the Order of Canada, and was subsequently promoted to the rank of Companion of the Order of Canada.

Swanage is stated as the hometown of John Cleese's character Basil Fawlty in the sitcom Fawlty Towers.

The first episode of the second series of the British sitcom The Inbetweeners, "The Field Trip", is set mainly in Swanage, although the episode was actually filmed in Littlehampton.

In 1997, a 12 mi (19 km) diameter crater on Mars was named after Swanage.

== In literature ==
Swanage is called Knollsea in Thomas Hardy's novels. In The Hand of Ethelberta it is described as "a seaside village lying snug within two headlands as between a finger and thumb".

In E. M. Forster's Howards End, Margaret and Mr. Wilcox first kiss there at the end of an evening's stroll, and the town is mentioned frequently throughout the book.

== See also ==
- List of Dorset beaches
