= Tilly Whim Caves =

Caves in Dorset, England

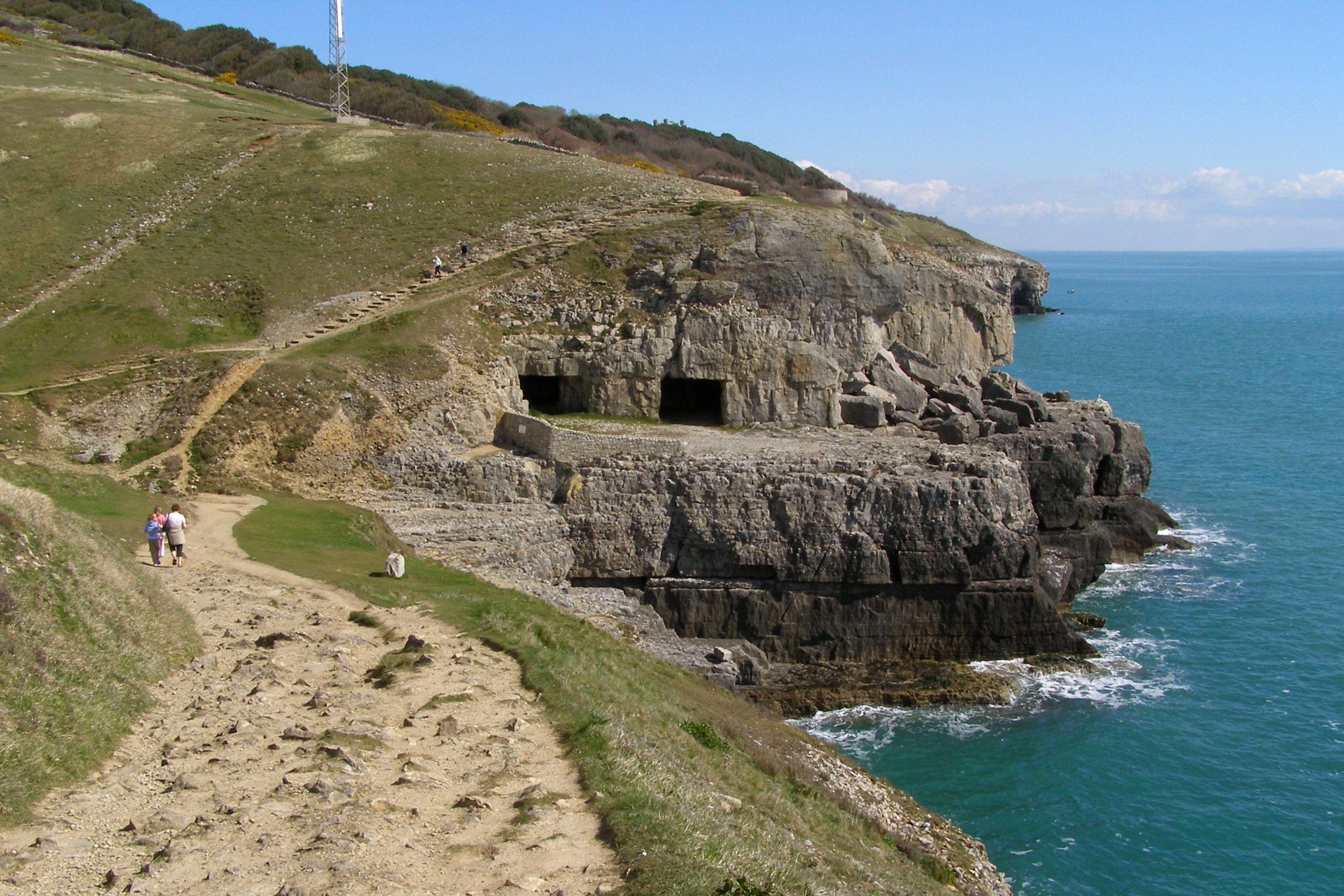
- Tilly Whim quarry and caves, from the coast path

- Location within Dorset
- Location: Durlston Country Park, 1 mile (1.6 km) south of Swanage, on the Isle of Purbeck, in Dorset, southern England
- Coordinates: 50.592511°N 1.957519°W
- Geology: Mesozoic Limestone
- Entrances: 1
- Access: Closed to the public

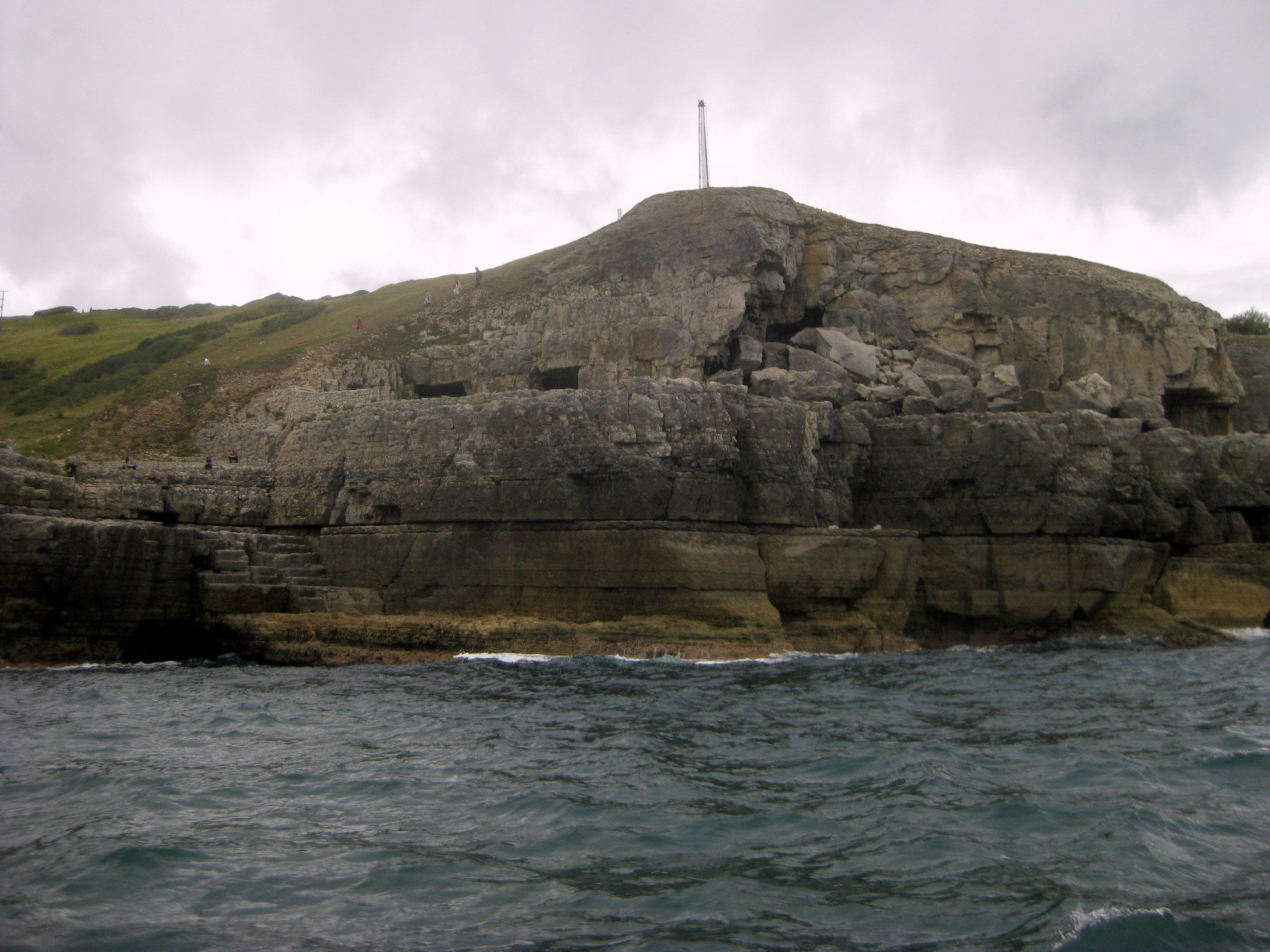
Tilly Whim Caves seen from the sea

A walker points to the old 'tourist' entrance to the caves

Tilly Whim Caves consists of three stone quarries in Durlston Country Park, 1 mile (1.6 km) south of Swanage, on the Isle of Purbeck, in Dorset, southern England. The Tilly Whim Caves are a part of the Jurassic Coast.

The name "Tilly Whim" may have been derived from a former quarryman, George Tilly, and the type of primitive wooden crane used at the time, known as a "whim", also called a derrick or gibbet. However, Tilly Whim lies at the southern end of the Manor of Eightholds and there is a common field called Tilly Mead at the northern end of the estate.

== History ==
Tilly Whim Caves were limestone quarries that were worked predominantly during the eighteenth century. Purbeck Stone, a valuable type of limestone, was extracted from the Tilly Whim caves. Using only metal punches, wedges and hammers to split the rock into workable blocks, the quarrymen mined the stone horizontally out of the cliff face. The quarrymen were also skilled stonemasons. They worked most of the stone within the quarry, either to building blocks or into finished items, for example as troughs or sinks. Using a "whim", a special type of wooden crane, the finished stonework was lowered from the quarry ledges to the boats below. The boats either shipped the stone directly to the stone yards on Swanage Quay or transferred them to large sailing ketches anchored offshore.

Purbeck stone was used extensively during the Napoleonic wars for building fortifications along the entire south coast of England. As the war ended, however, the demand for stone slumped and the quarries were closed. The caves have not been quarried since 1812. In 1887 George Burt opened Tilly Whim caves as a tourist attraction for his Durlston estate. In 1976 the caves were closed to the public completely, being considered too dangerous due to rock falls.

Today the caves are an undisturbed roost for bats. The cliffs and ledges are nesting grounds for seabirds. The area surrounding Tilly Whim is also a look out point for marine life, including grey seals and dolphins. However, the area is still popular with fishermen and "tombstoners".

== Notable visitors ==
The poet T. S. Eliot visited the Tilly Whim Caves in 1914 while studying at Merton College, Oxford.
