= John Mowlem =

English stonemason and builder

John Mowlem

John Mowlem (12 October 1788 – 8 March 1868) was an English stonemason, builder and founder of the quarrying and construction company "Mowlem, Burt and Freeman".

== Career ==
Mowlem was born in Swanage, Dorset, the son of a quarryman. As a young man, he worked in the quarries of the Isle of Purbeck: he was reputedly one of the last people to work in the quarry at Tilly Whim and, as a stonemason, on the Isle of Wight.

He travelled to London in 1807 where he started working for Henry Westmacott, the Government mason and builder, as a general foreman: Mowlem personally worked on Nelson's Tomb in St Paul's Cathedral, Somerset House and the Royal Mews at Charing Cross.

In 1812 he married Susannah Manwell, the daughter of another Swanage man. In 1822 he set up business as a paving contractor and stone merchant, building up a large business and paving Blackfriars Bridge amongst other areas. In 1839 Mowlem moved briefly to Guernsey, which was the source of much of the granite used by his business. He left the London side of the business in the care of George Burt (his wife's nephew), and Joseph Freeman (Burt's brother-in-law). By 1845 the two men had joined Mowlem as partners, and the company (aided by Mowlem's purchase and management of Guernsey quarries) had won several large contracts, including the maintenance of the masonry of all government property in the London district.

Once Burt and Freeman had been taken on as partners, Mowlem moved back to Swanage, but maintained an interest in the business as well as acting philanthropically within the town of his birth. He died in 1868, childless, and the business, which ultimately became known simply as Mowlem passed on to Burt.

== See also ==
- Mowlem — the company
