= Durlston Bay =

Bay and fossil site near Dorset, England

Coordinates: 50°36′04″N 1°56′55″W

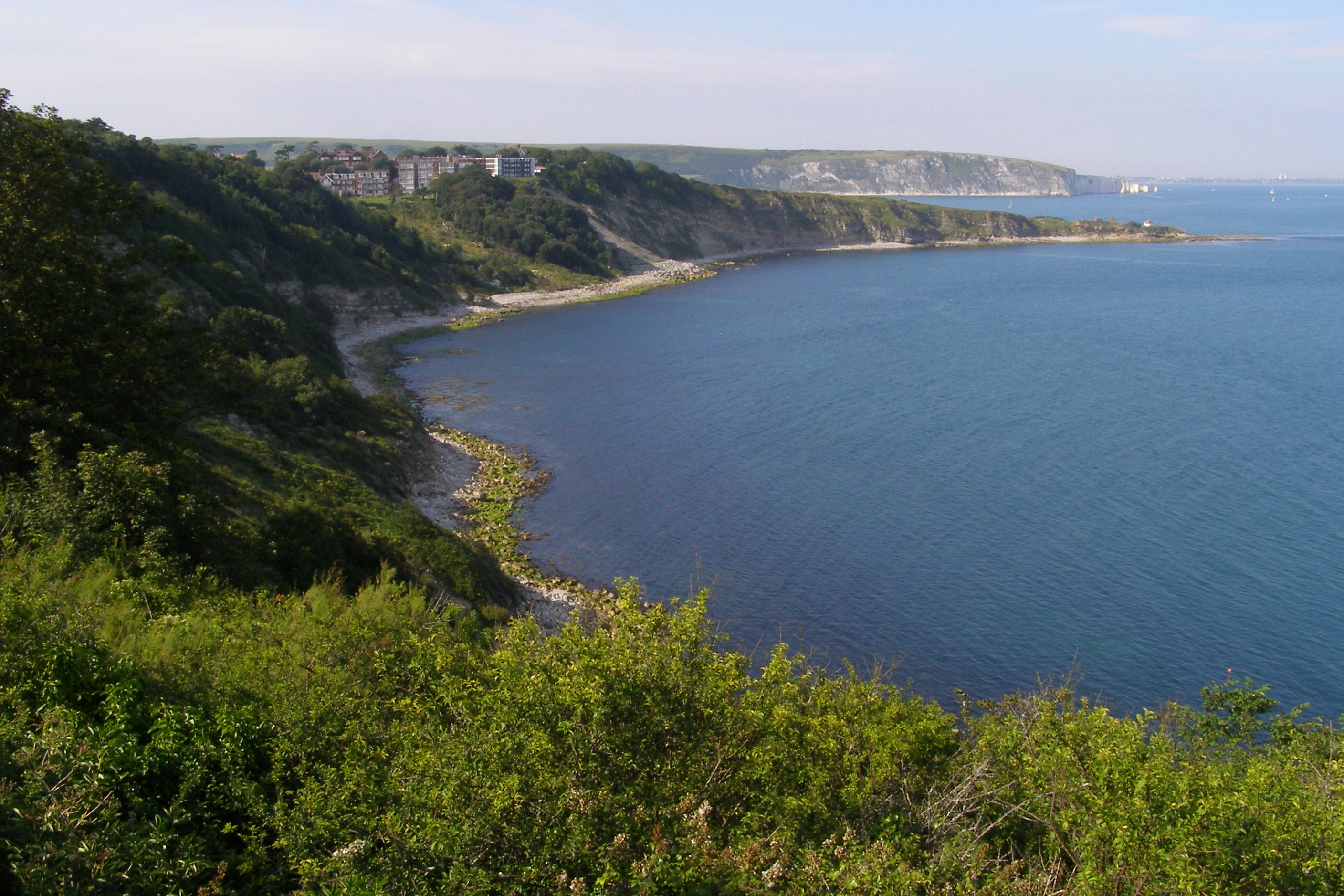
Durlston Bay from Durlston Head

Durlston Bay (also known as Durdlestone Bay) is a small bay next to a country park of the same name, just south of the resort of Swanage, on the Isle of Purbeck in Dorset, England. It has been a renowned site for Lower Cretaceous fossils since the initial discovery of fragments there by Samuel Beckles in the 1850s.

== See also ==
- List of Dorset beaches
