= George Burt (Britain) =

English stonemason and contractor (1816–1894)

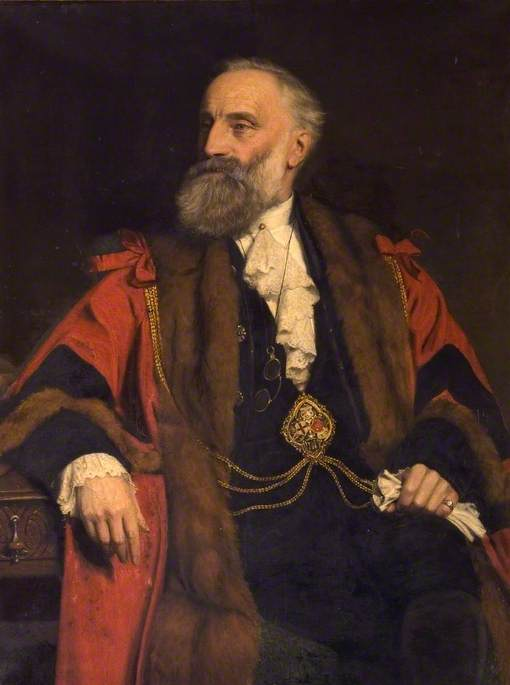
George Burt

George Burt (2 October 1816 – 18 April 1894) was a public-works contractor and businessman from Swanage, England, who managed the construction company Mowlem, that was founded by his uncle John Mowlem.

== Career ==
George's father was Robert (1788–1847), a stone merchant, whose stone and coal business was located in Swanage High Street. His mother was Letitia born Manwell (1786–1861), sister-in-law to John Mowlem who was a struggling workman in London at the time of George's birth. George, as did his uncle before him, worked in the quarries around Swanage. George had five siblings, Elizabeth Letitia (1818–1889), Robert Henry (1821–1876), Charles (1823-1890), Francis Alfred (1825-1898) and Susannah Ann, 'Susy' (1829–1871).

In 1835 George Burt moved to London to join Mowlem's business, becoming a partner in 1844, and managing the business after Mowlem's semi-retirement the following year. He married Elizabeth Hudson in 1841, and the couple had five children. Elizabeth Sophia (1843–1880), John Mowlem (1845–1894), Annie (1846–1918), Emma Rust (1849–1910) and George (1851-1919).

Upon taking over the Mowlem's company, Burt substantially expanded the firm's operations. Surviving the lean years during the financial crisis of 1866-7, his company became a major public-works contractor and won the contract for Queen Victoria Street in the City of London (1869), followed by Billingsgate Market (1874-7), and the City of London School in 1880 on the new Victoria Embankment, amongst others.

Burt, like his uncle, maintained an interest in Swanage, establishing gas and waterworks, developing the Durlston estate, and lived in a large house called "Purbeck House", now a hotel, on the main street. He and his wife bought the house for £550 and lived in it for 17 years. The porch is made of white Cornish granite, the mosaic floor is copied from the pavement in Queen Victoria Street, London and some of the tiles are from the Palace of Westminster. The Swanage suburb of Durlston was conceived of and developed by Burt. However it was never completed, part of the land originally intended for the development is now Durlston Country Park. Burt was responsible for the erection of the Prince Albert Memorial in 1862, which was the first civic memorial to the Prince.

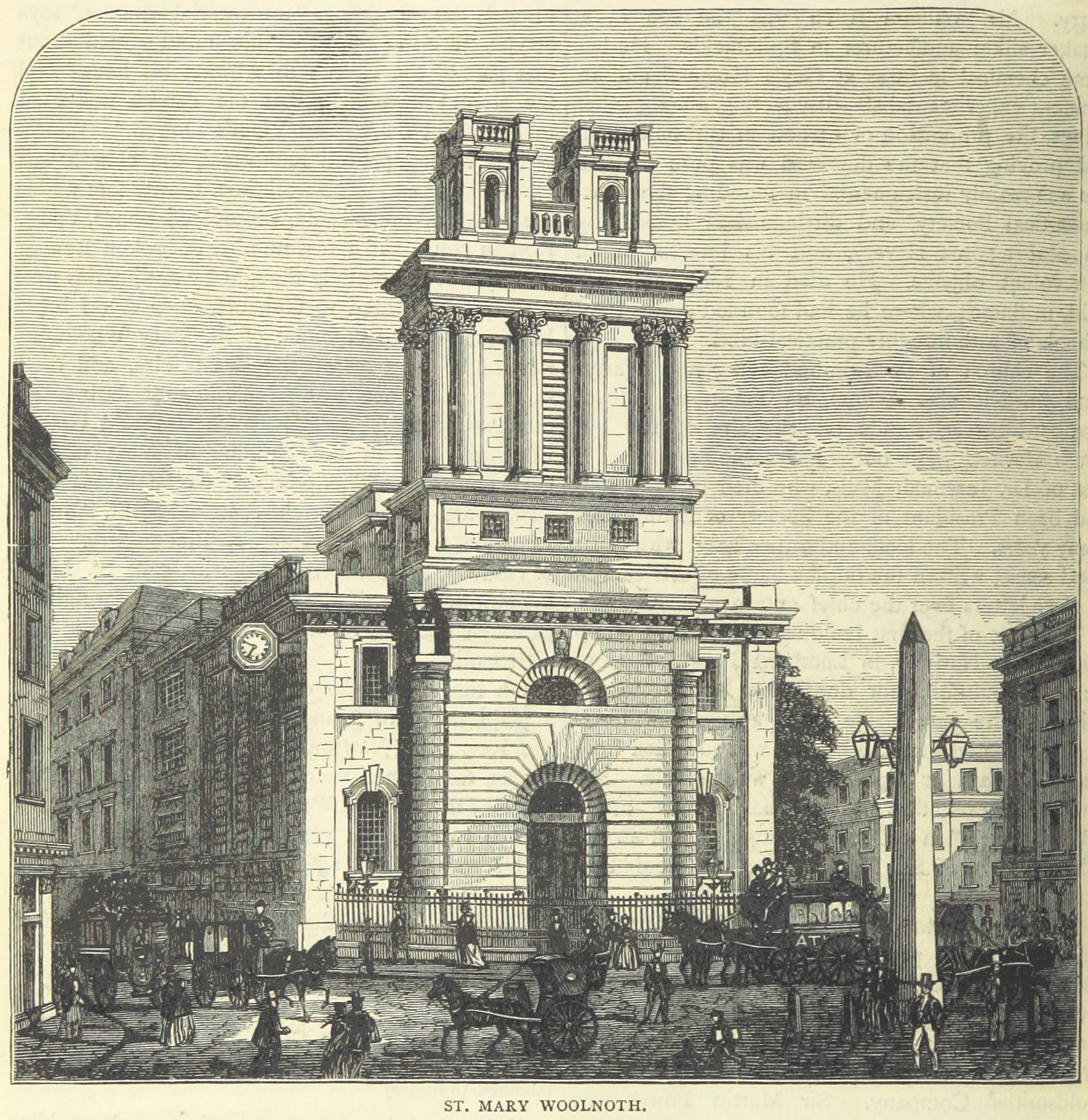
The monument outside St Mary Woolnoth, which was taken down by Burt and re-erected at Ballard Down in 1892.

Many architecturally interesting buildings and monuments were scavenged as a result of the company's construction work on prestigious projects in London, and re-erected by Burt in Swanage and Durlston. The 1670 porch for the Mercers' Hall now adorns Swanage town hall, and a clock tower commemorating the Duke of Wellington which once stood at the Southwark end of London Bridge is now a feature of Swanage seafront. More prosaically, many of Swanage's cast iron bollards were originally made for London boroughs, and still carry their names.

George Burt was buried at Kensal Green Cemetery. Control of the company passed to his descendants Sir John Mowlem Burt (1845–1918) and Sir George Mowlem Burt (1884–1964).

== See also ==
- Mowlem - the company
