= Corfe Castle railway station =

Railway station on Swanage heritage railway, Dorset, England

Corfe Castle
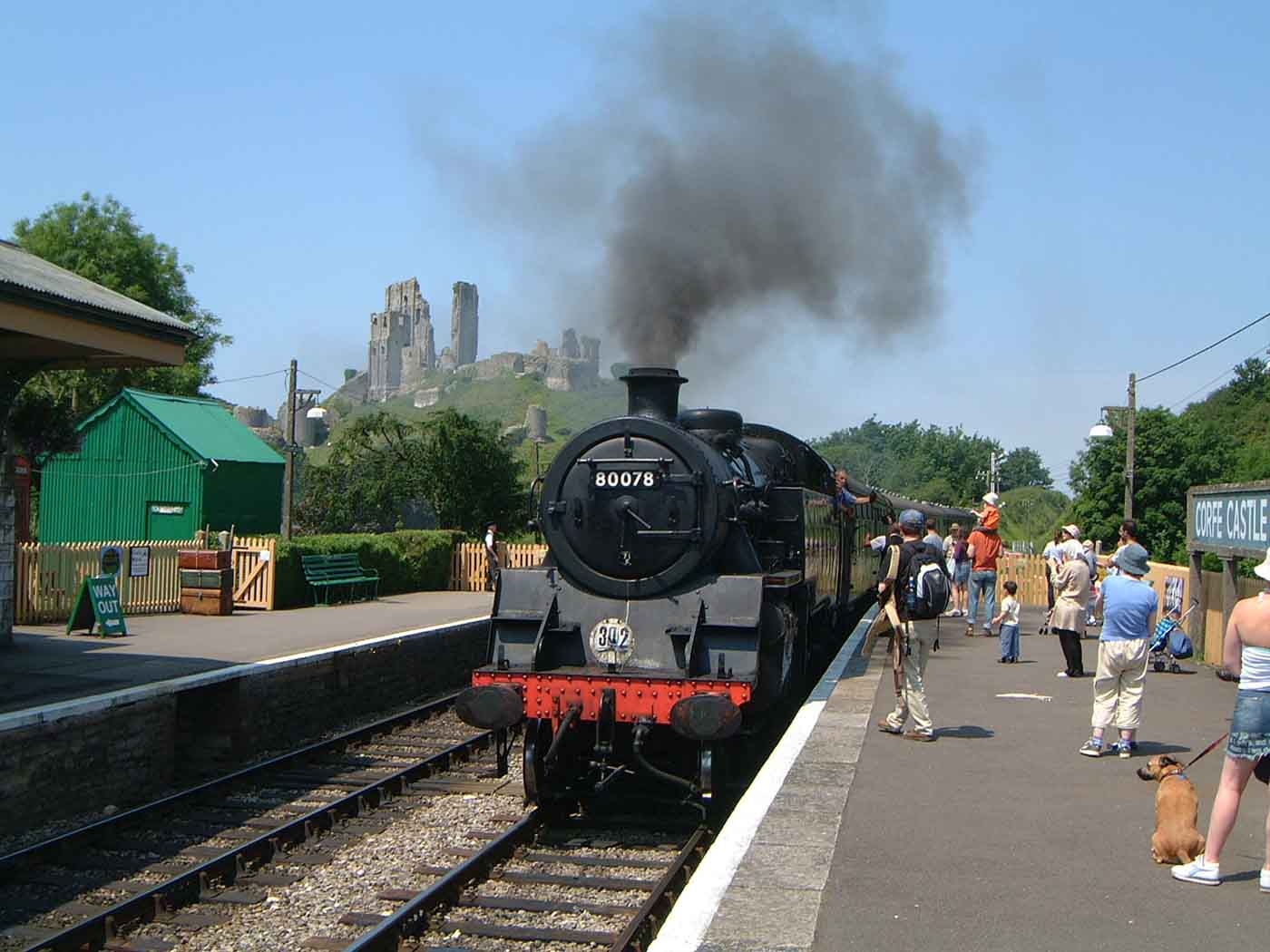
- Steam locomotive 80078 pulls into Corfe Castle station. The castle is visible in the background.

General information
- Location: Corfe Castle, Dorset; England
- Coordinates: 50.6383°N 2.0551°W
- Grid reference: SY962820
- Platforms: 2

Other information
- Station code: CFC

History
- Original company: Swanage Railway

Key dates
- 20 May 1885: Opened
- 3 January 1972: Closed
- 12 August 1995: Reopened
- 26 May 2018: National Rail services commence
- 6 July 2019: National Rail services suspended
Location

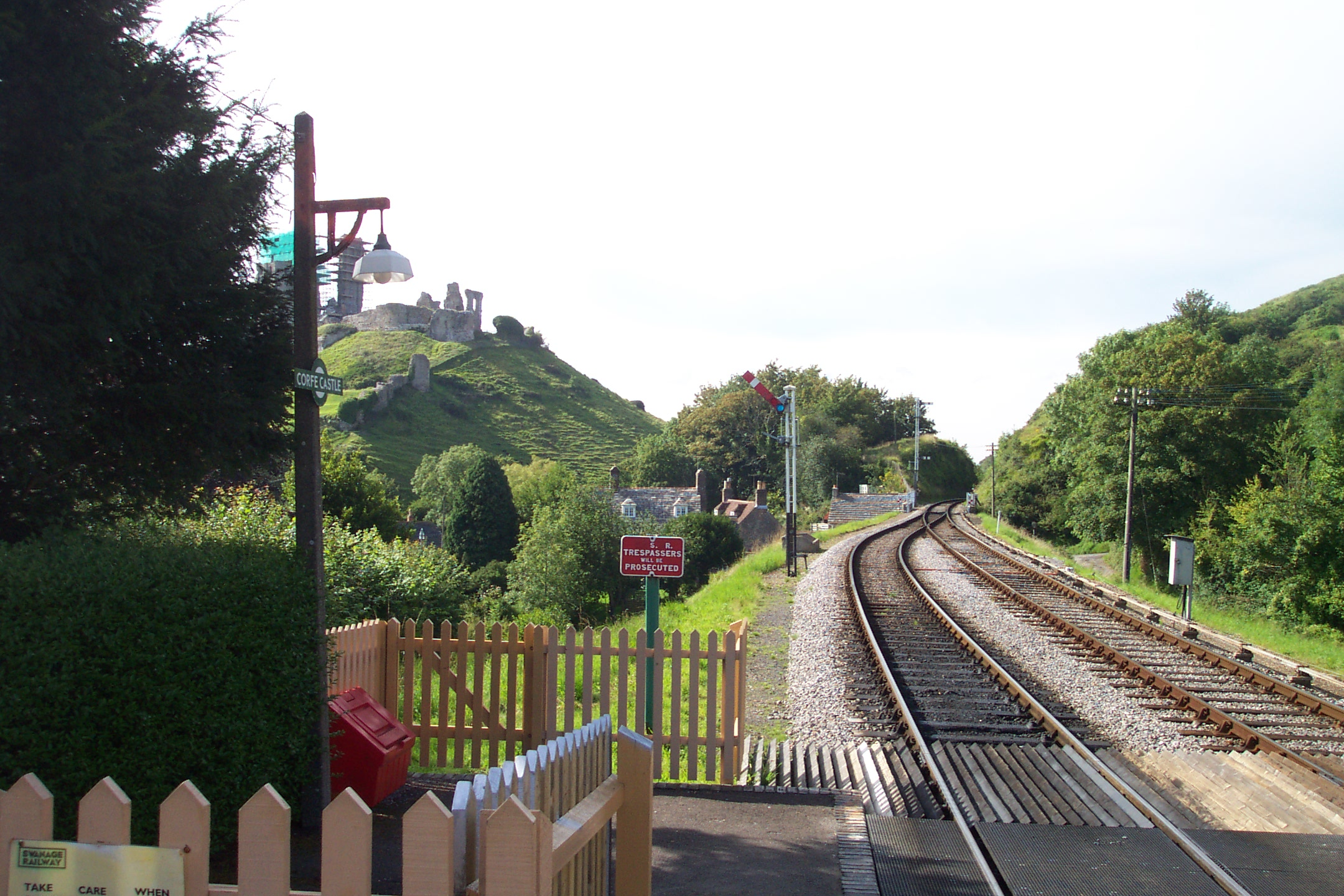
The railway line to the north of the station, showing the gap the line must pass through between Castle Hill to the left and East Hill to the right.

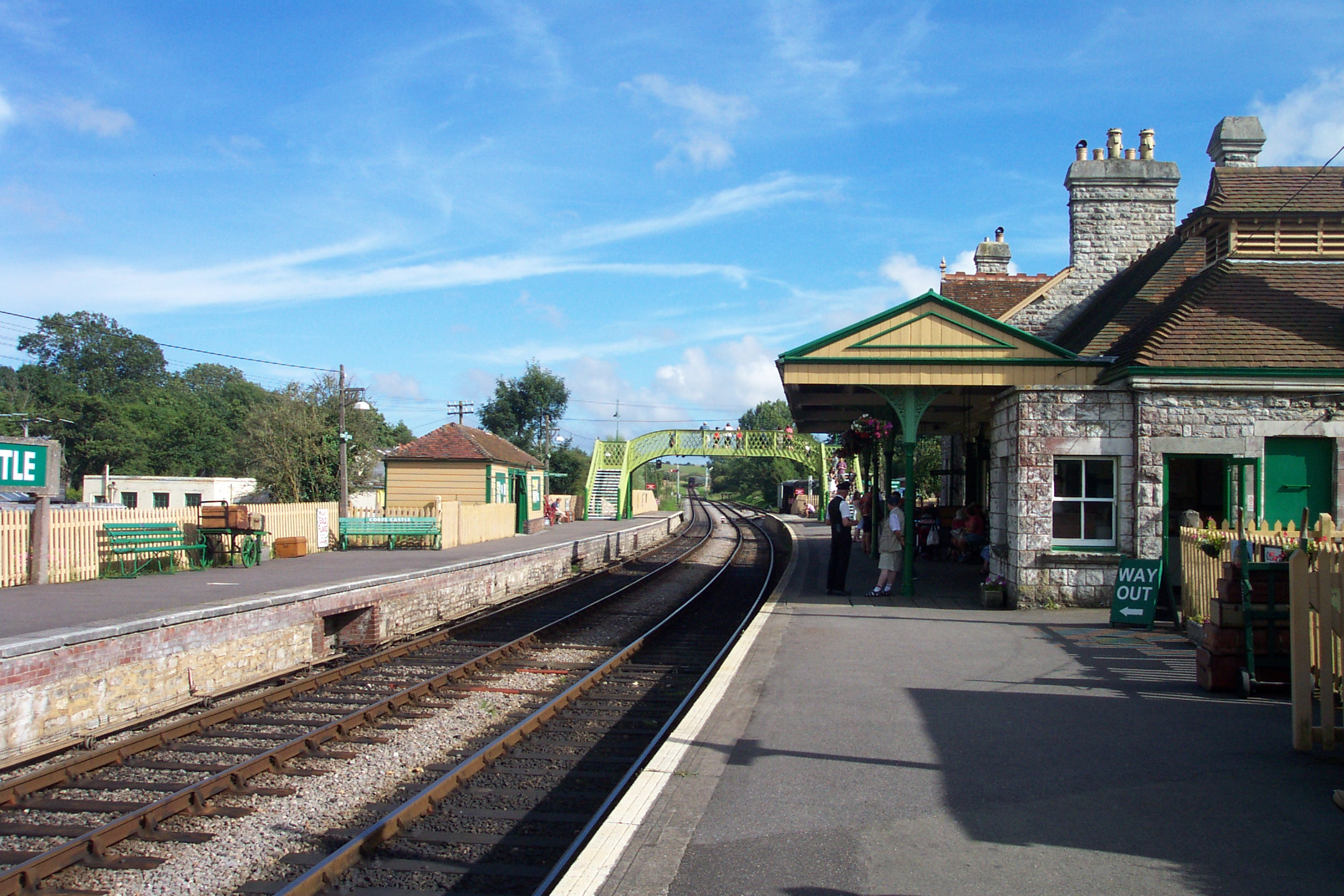
The railway station, looking south towards Swanage.

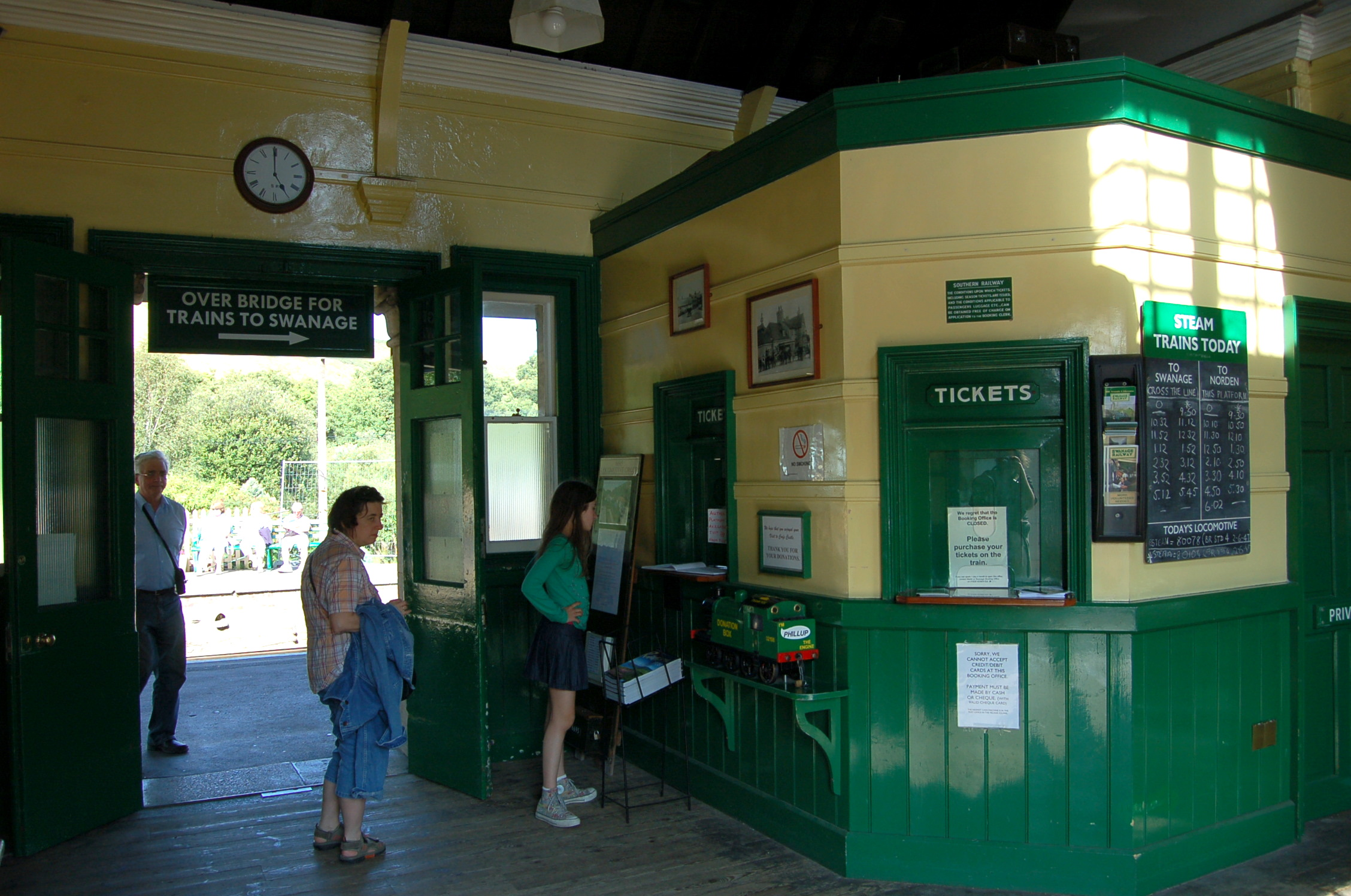
The ticket office

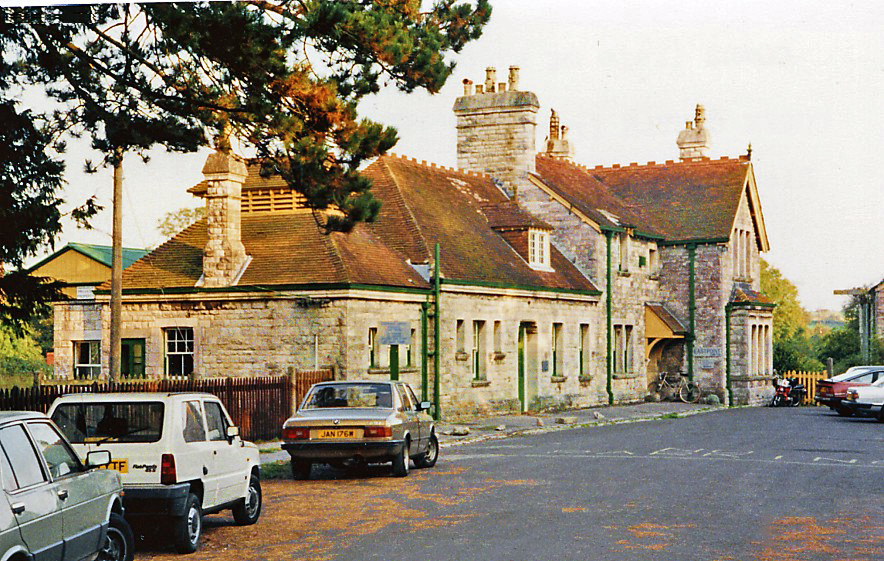
Station approach (1986)

Corfe Castle railway station is a railway station located in the village of Corfe Castle, in the English county of Dorset. Originally an intermediate station on the London and South Western Railway (L&SWR) branch line from Wareham to Swanage, the line and station were closed by British Rail in 1972. It has since reopened as a station on the Swanage Railway, a heritage railway that runs regularly from Norden station just north of Corfe Castle to Swanage station. The line also connects Wareham and Norden.

== History ==
Corfe Castle lies in the centre of the Isle of Purbeck, a peninsula bordered by the English Channel to the south, and by the marshy lands of the River Frome and Poole Harbour to the north and east. At the beginning of the 19th century, the area around Corfe Castle was known for its supply of Purbeck Ball Clay, which at that time was shipped by a pair of horse-drawn tramways (the Middlebere Plateway and the Furzebrook Railway) to wharves on Poole Harbour. The port of Swanage at the tip of the Isle was equally well known for the Purbeck Marble that was mined locally and shipped out by sea.

The presence of these industries attracted railway promoters once the L&SWR main line reached Wareham in 1847. Several schemes were promoted and failed, but eventually the Swanage Railway received its Act in 1881 and opened on 20 May 1885. The position of Corfe Castle, commanding the only relatively low level route across the hilly spine of the Isle of Purbeck, meant that line passed close to the centre of the village, and Corfe Castle station was built for the opening of the line. From its opening, the line was operated by the L&SWR, and line was absorbed into that railway in 1886. Corfe Castle station was the only intermediate station on the Swanage branch, a status it retained until closure by British Rail, and possessed the only passing loop between the junction with the main line at Worgret Junction and Swanage. At least one camping coach was positioned here by the Southern Region from 1954 to 1967, and probably from 1948 to 1953. From 1960, the allocated coach was a camping coach converted from a Pullman car, which was fitted with a full kitchen, two sleeping compartments and a room with two single beds, from 1962 until 1967 there were two of these coaches here.

While the development of Swanage as a tourist resort brought additional passenger traffic to the line, the collapse of both the clay and marble industries, and the increase in private car ownership in the second half of the 20th century made the line unprofitable. Closure was first proposed in 1967, and despite local opposition the line finally closed on 3 January 1972. During the final few years of the line's operation under British Rail, passenger train services were operated by two-car Class 205 diesel electric multiple units (also known as type 2H).

From the time of the first proposal of closure, a campaign to reopen the railway as a steam locomotive operated heritage railway developed. Most of the track bed, including Corfe Castle station, was bought by Dorset County Council. Proposals to use the railway route through the Corfe Castle gap as a road bypass for the village were eventually rejected by the county council in 1986. In the meantime the Swanage Railway had started operating a steam service at the Swanage end of the line in 1982.

There were concerns that reopening Corfe Castle station as a northern terminus for the Swanage Railway would cause parking problems in the village. It was therefore decided to extend the line a further half a mile north to a new Park and Ride site built on the former location of the exchange sidings between the Swanage branch and the clay tramways. Here the new Norden station was built and most trains terminate here. Corfe Castle station reopened on 12 August 1995, although the official opening was not until February of the following year.

A 5-year project by Swanage Railway volunteers to install a footbridge across the running lines between the platforms at Corfe Castle was completed in April, 2007, when David Quarmby, CBE, carried out the official opening. The footbridge was originally built in 1893 by the London, Brighton and South Coast Railway (LB&SCR), with cast-iron columns and a wrought iron span, the footbridge spent much of its life at Merton Park railway station near Wimbledon in London, on the Wimbledon - West Croydon line until removed by Swanage Railway volunteers prior to that lines conversion to London Trams in 2000. The footbridge can accommodate the people who now use Corfe Castle station, and is safer and more convenient for the public than crossing over the track via the gated and locked foot crossing. The project won the National Railway Heritage Awards in December 2007, with a plaque presented to civil engineer Philip Wycliffe-Jones of the Swanage Railway and his team of volunteers by the late Gwyneth Dunwoody, Chairman of the House of Commons' Transport Select Committee.

In summer 2018 and 2019 South Western Railway operated two trains per day to/from Wareham, one of which continued to Poole and the other to London Waterloo via Weymouth. There were also National Rail services on Saturdays and Sundays between Wareham and Swanage in summer 2018 and 2019 operated by West Coast Railway Company with three trains per day in each direction. However, in July 2019 these services were stopped and there are currently no National Rail services to Corfe Castle. For April to September 2023, Swanage Railway ran a four-days-per-week service from Wareham to Swanage via Corfe Castle.

== Services ==
Services run every day from the beginning of April to late October, with weekend only operation in March, November and December. The level of service varies from 6 to 17 trains a day in each direction, depending the season and the day of the week. Southbound, trains operate to stations at Harman's Cross (10 min), Herston (trains stop only on request), and Swanage (21 min). Northbound, trains operate to Norden station (3 min).

Preceding station	Heritage railways	Following station
Norden Terminus	Swanage Railway	Harman's Cross towards Swanage

== Museum ==
Corfe Castle station is also the home of the Swanage Railway's Railway Museum, which is housed in the old goods shed and an adjacent rail van. The museum is open on most operating days.

The museum includes Secundus, a narrow gauge steam locomotive built by Bellis and Seekings in 1874 for the nearby Furzebrook Railway. This locomotive was in use until 1955, and then displayed in the now defunct Birmingham Museum of Science and Industry until 2000. It is planned that the locomotive will eventually be transferred to a new home at the Purbeck Mineral and Mining Museum, currently being developed adjacent to Norden railway station.
