= Harman's Cross =

Village in Dorset, England

Coordinates: 50.623°N 2.0236°W

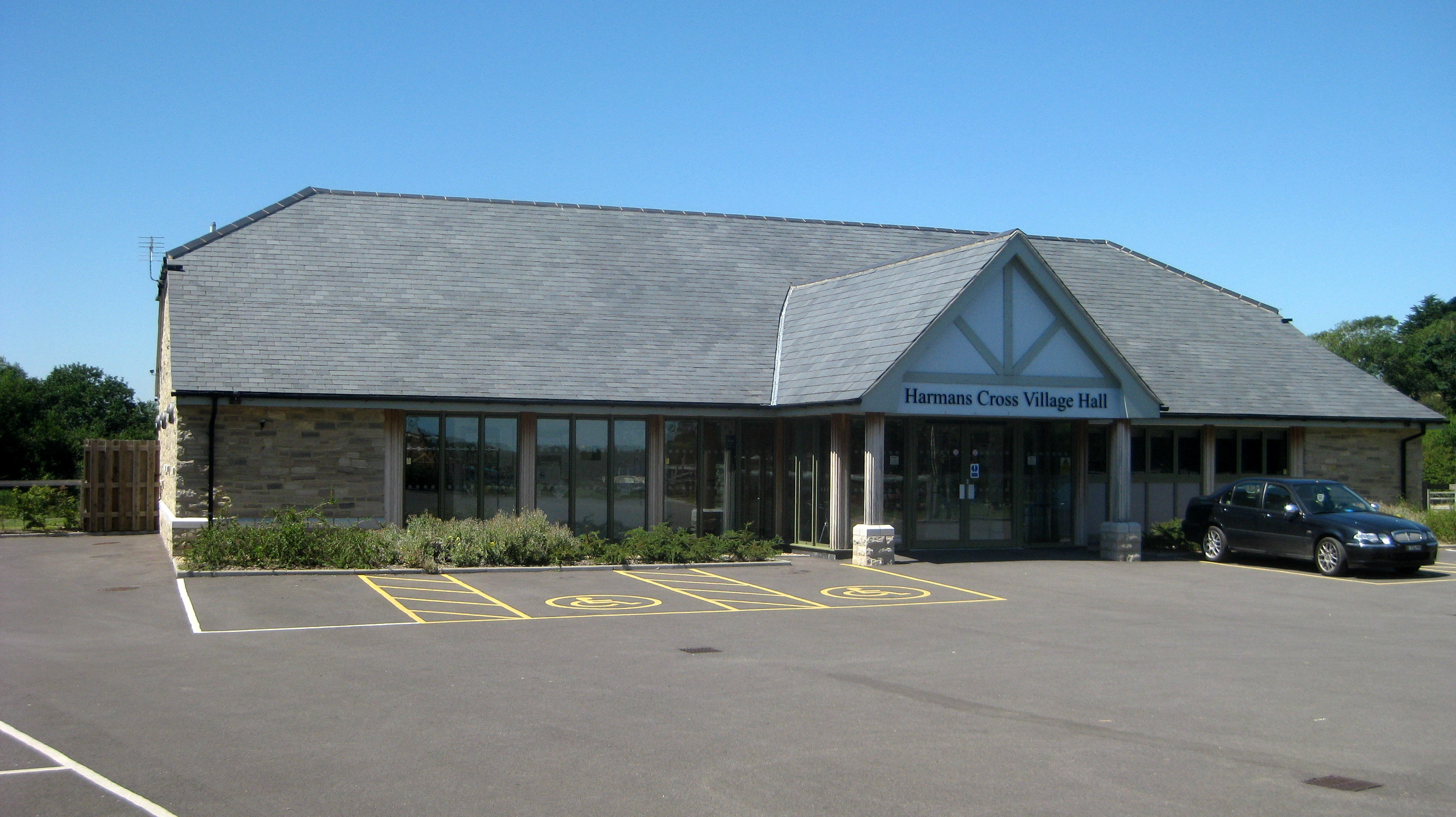
- Harman's Cross Village Hall

- Location within Dorset
- OS grid reference: SY984803
- Civil parish: Worth Matravers
- Unitary authority: Dorset
- Ceremonial county: Dorset
- Region: South West
- Country: England
- Sovereign state: United Kingdom
- Post town: SWANAGE/WAREHAM
- Postcode district: BH19/BH20
- Dialling code: 01929
- Police: Dorset
- Fire: Dorset and Wiltshire
- Ambulance: South Western
- UK Parliament: South Dorset

Harman's Cross is a small village on the Isle of Purbeck in Dorset, England. It is situated on the A351 road between Swanage and Corfe Castle.

The village is within the civil parish of Worth Matravers, which is itself within the South Dorset constituency of the House of Commons.

Harman's Cross is the location of Harman's Cross railway station, one of the intermediate stations on the Swanage Railway, a steam locomotive operated heritage railway. The railway links the tourist centres of Corfe Castle and Swanage with each other, and with a Park and Ride site at Norden station just to the north of Corfe Castle.

A new village hall opened in July 2010, achieved as a result of residents securing funding from various external sources.
