= Harman's Cross railway station =

Railway station in Dorset, England

Harman's Cross
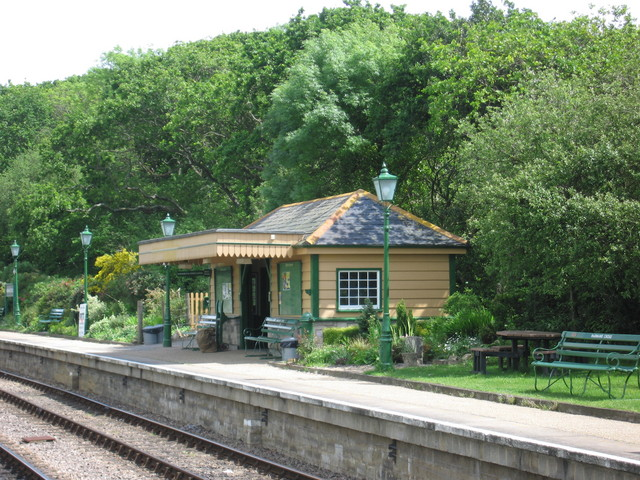
- The main station building

General information
- Location: Harman's Cross, Dorset; England
- Coordinates: 50.6198°N 2.0271°W
- Grid reference: SY982800
- System: Station on heritage railway
- Platforms: 2

History
- Original company: Swanage Railway

Key dates
- March 1989: Opened
Location

Harman's Cross railway station is a railway station located in the village of Harman's Cross, on the Isle of Purbeck in the English county of Dorset. It is an intermediate station on the Swanage Railway, a heritage railway that currently operates from Swanage to Norden (and occasionally to Wareham ).

== History ==
The Swanage Railway follows the route of the former London and South Western Railway line from Wareham to Swanage, a line that opened in 1885 and was finally closed by British Rail in 1972. From the time of closure, a strong campaign to reopen the railway as a steam locomotive operated heritage railway developed, and the Swanage Railway began operating a steam service at the Swanage end of the line in 1982.

The original line did not have a station at Harman's Cross, and the current station was opened in March 1989 by the Swanage Railway as a temporary terminus for the line. Following the extension of the line to Corfe Castle and Norden in 1995, a new signal box and passing loop were constructed in 1997, and this has made Harman's Cross the main crossing point for trains between Swanage and Norden.

== Services ==
Services run every day from the beginning of April to late October, with weekend only operation November to March. The level of service varies from 6 to 17 trains a day in each direction, depending the season and the day of the week. Southbound, trains operate to stations at Herston (trains stop only on request), and Swanage (11 mins). Northbound, trains operate to stations at Corfe Castle (10 mins) and Norden (13 mins) with certain services continuing on to Wareham.

Preceding station	Heritage railways	Following station
Corfe Castle towards Norden	Swanage Railway	Herston Halt towards Swanage
