= Swanage Museum & Heritage Centre =

History museum and family history centre in Dorset, England

Coordinates: 50.608263°N 1.9557850°W

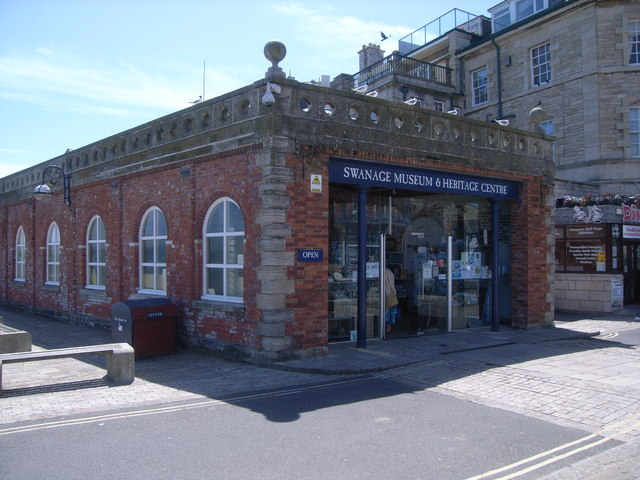
Swanage Museum and Heritage Centre in 2008

Swanage Museum & Heritage Centre is a local history museum and family history centre in Swanage, Dorset. The museum was established in 1976; it merged with and has been collocated with the heritage centre in its current location since 2005.

== Tithe Barn Museum ==
The museum was established in 1976 by David Florence and Phyllis Mapley and was known as the Tithe Barn Museum & Art Centre. The museum had exhibits relating to Swanage and Purbeck, including geology, local history, archaeology, maritime and stone quarrying.

The tithe barn is Grade II listed and is built of Purbeck stone. The listing entry describes the barn as 18th-century, although the local historian David Lewer attributed it to the 16th-century. The museum was held on a 99-year peppercorn lease. Since the museum vacated the tithe barn in 2005, it has become a private residence.

== Heritage Centre ==
The heritage centre was located in the old market building on the seafront, built in the 1890s. The remnants of the Swanage Pier Tramway commence on the footway adjacent to the old market building.

== The present museum and heritage centre ==
In 2005 the museum was forced to leave its home in the tithe barn due to deathwatch beetle in the roof which it could not afford to repair, and merged with the Heritage Centre in The Square. It moved into an area of the Heritage Centre that had formerly been dedicated to showing a film about Swanage. The combined facility was opened in 2006.

Until 2010 the museum was staffed by employees of the then Purbeck District Council, but budgetary constraints mean that the museum is now run by volunteers. It has two other sites apart from the main site which is open to the public. The other two sites are the local studies centre at Marine Villas on Swanage Pier and a climate-controlled family history storage facility on a local industrial estate. Until 2015, the storage facility was held at Belle Vue Farm.

The curator (2015) is David Haysom. The museum has exhibits on fossils, the fishing industry, Purbeck stone, and a number of Victorian shop fronts.
