= Herston Halt railway station =

Railway station in Dorset, England

Herston Halt
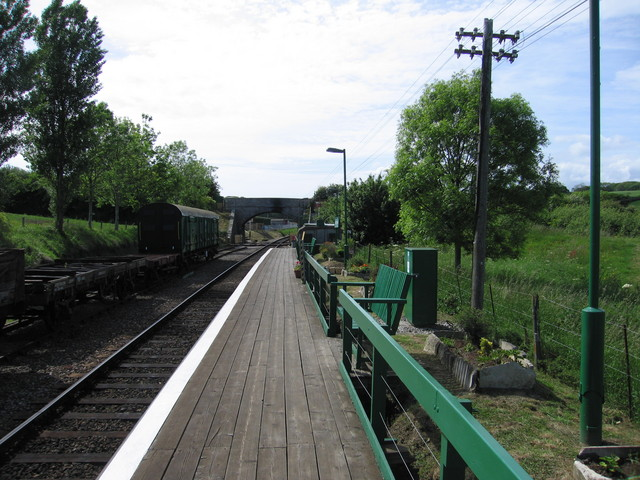
- The platform, looking west

General information
- Location: Swanage, Dorset; England
- Coordinates: 50.6131°N 1.9804°W
- Grid reference: SZ014792
- System: Station on heritage railway
- Platforms: 1

History
- Original company: Swanage Railway

Key dates
- 1984: Opened
Location

Herston Halt railway station is a railway station located at Herston near Swanage, on the Isle of Purbeck in the English county of Dorset. It is an intermediate station on the Swanage Railway, a heritage railway that currently operates from Swanage to Norden (and on special occasions to Wareham ).

== History ==
The Swanage Railway follows the route of the former London and South Western Railway line from Wareham to Swanage, a line that opened in 1885 and was closed by British Rail in 1972. From the time of closure, a strong campaign to reopen the railway as a steam locomotive operated heritage railway developed, and the Swanage Railway began operating a steam service at the Swanage end of the line in 1982.

The original line did not have a station at Herston Halt, and the current station was opened at Easter 1984 by the Swanage Railway as a temporary terminus for the line. The station opened as a simple wooden platform construction which took two coaches, which has now been dismantled and replaced with a concrete platform recovered from the old Woodside railway station. The station reopened on Good Friday 2009 – 25 years after the original opening.

== Future ==
The Swanage Railway have started working on a carriage shed just east of the station towards Swanage, this is because of the lack of covered accommodation. The foundations of the shed are complete as well as the track, but they still need £150,000 for the structure of the building.

== Services ==
Trains stop at Herston Halt on request only. Services run every day from the beginning of April to late October, with weekend only operation in March, November and December. The level of service varies from 6 to 17 trains a day in each direction, depending the season and the day of the week. Southbound, trains operate to Swanage station. Northbound, trains operate to stations at Harman's Cross, Corfe Castle, and Norden (also on special occasions to Wareham).

Preceding station	Heritage railways	Following station
Harman's Cross towards Norden	Swanage Railway	Swanage Terminus
