= Herston, Dorset =

Suburb of Swanage, Dorset, England

Coordinates: 50.611°N 1.976°W

Herston
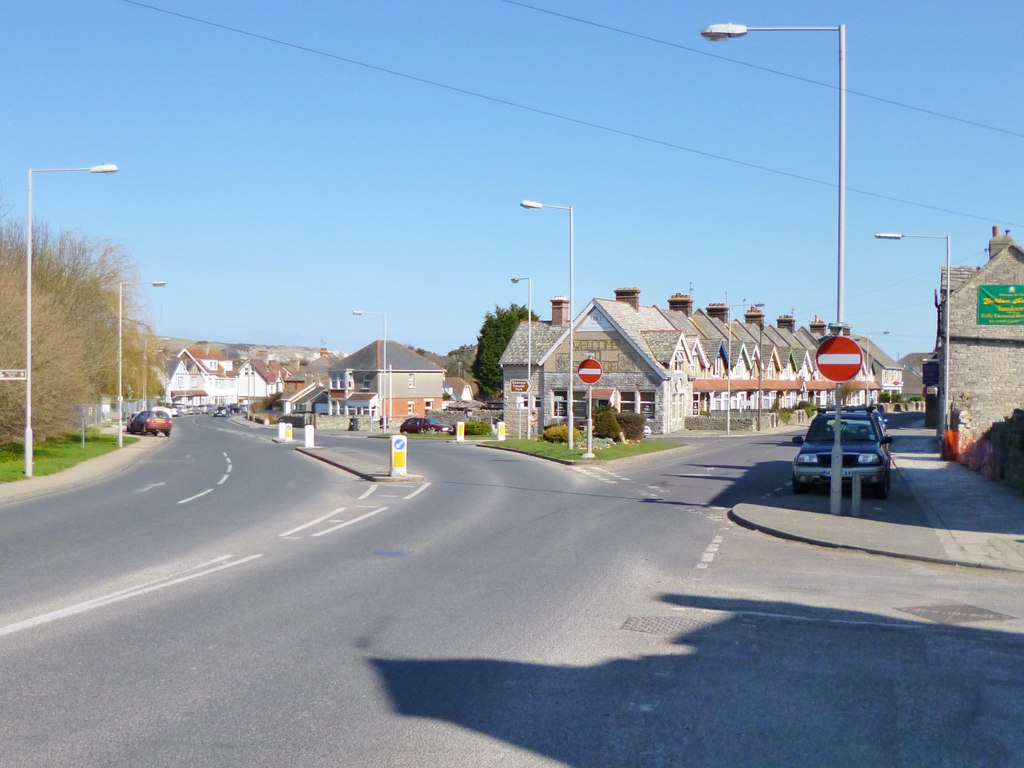
- Herston Cross

- Location within Dorset
- OS grid reference: SZ018788
- Civil parish: Swanage
- Unitary authority: Dorset
- Ceremonial county: Dorset
- Region: South West
- Country: England
- Sovereign state: United Kingdom
- Post town: SWANAGE
- Postcode district: BH19
- Dialling code: 01929
- Police: Dorset
- Fire: Dorset and Wiltshire
- Ambulance: South Western
- UK Parliament: South Dorset

Herston is a western suburb of the town of Swanage, in Dorset, England. It has its own railway station – Herston Halt railway station Near Corfe Castle – on the Swanage Railway. There is a park on Days Road. The Swanage School is in this area. 9 Miles From Wareham. Swanage Costal Park Can Be found Here
