= Purbeck Mineral and Mining Museum =

Museum in Dorset, England

Coordinates: 50.645468°N 2.061965°W

Purbeck Mining Museum
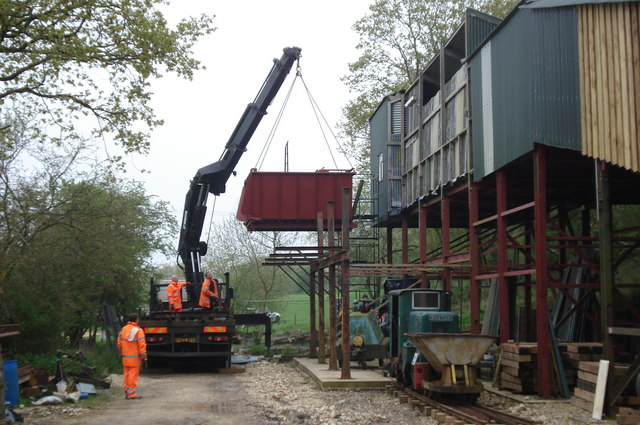
- Purbeck Mining Museum under construction
- Terminus: Norden

Commercial operations
- Built by: Purbeck Mining Museum -Swanage Railway Trust
- Original gauge: 3 ft 9 in (1,143 mm)

Preserved operations
- Stations: 0
- Preserved gauge: 2 ft (610 mm)

Commercial history
- Opened: 1806
- Closed: 1972

Preservation history
- 2004: Planning permission is granted to develop a mining museum adjacent to Norden Station
- 2013: Steam returns to the Line, officially
- Headquarters: Swanage

Website
- www.purbeckminingmuseum.org

The Purbeck Mining Museum was formed to preserve, record and interpret the historic extractive industries in ball clay mining in the Isle of Purbeck. The museum is located adjacent to Norden station on the Swanage Railway and is open on selected days from the end of March to early November on weekends, some weekdays and Bank Holidays from 11:00 to 16:00 (last admission 15:30) - it is normally open every day during the school holidays.

The redundant Norden No7 mine structure has been rebuilt on the site of the old Norden Clay Works with a narrow gauge railway laid around the site together with a new engine shed. The museum has three resident locomotives and a selection of restored wagons that worked on the lines around Norden.

One of the future aims of the museum is to construct a new building at Norden to house Secundus, a 2 ft 8 in (813 mm) gauge steam locomotive, wagons and other artefacts not on display at present. It will also contain a library and education centre.

It is planned to extend the narrow gauge railway to the other side of the Swanage Branch line to land owned by the group via Bridge 15. In 2010 a structural engineer surveyed Bridge 15, a skew bridge over the Swanage Railway. The condition of the bridge was good for a "temporary" bridge built in 1885. Since then the bridge has been involved in a serious incident in which it has been severely damaged.

== History ==
=== Middlebere Tramway ===
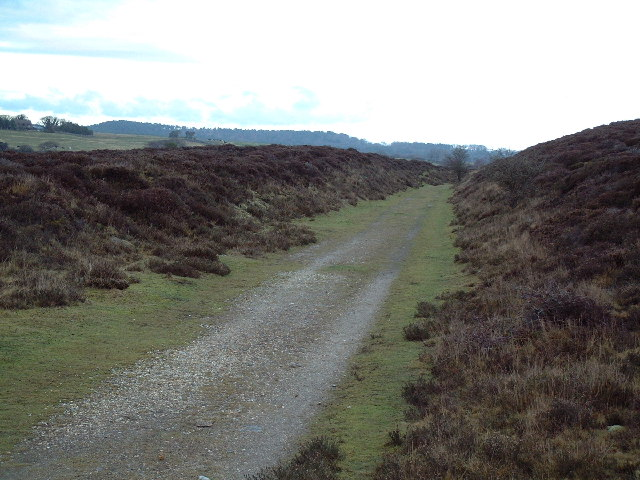
A slight cutting on the route of the plateway across Hartland Moor

The Middlebere Tramway was funded by Benjamin Fayle, a close friend of Thomas Byerley of Wedgwood, the Staffordshire pottery. When the original owner of the clay pits, Barker Chofney, was declared bankrupt, Fayle took them over to ensure a reliable supply of Ball Clay for Wedgwood and other potteries. The Iron Rail Way, as it was originally known, opened in 1806. It was designed by John Hodgkinson using the same construction techniques as the Surrey Iron Railway. It was 3 ft 9 in (1,143 mm) gauge and 3 1/2 miles (5.6 km) long. The rails were cast iron, L-shaped, 3 feet (910 mm) long and weighed 40 pounds (18 kg). The horse-drawn clay wagons had flangeless wheels, and the sleepers were simply stone blocks 60 to 70 pounds (27 to 32 kg) each numbering well in excess of 10,000. The cast iron rails were secured to the sleepers with metal spike and oak dowel.

In 1807, the line was extended south under the Wareham to Corfe road. The tunnel exists and is a listed building, however it is blocked. A second tunnel was built in 1825 east of the first tunnel and it is also blocked. In 1881, when the LSWR built the Swanage line the Middlebere Tramway was extended east parallel to the new line and Eldons Sidings were built to transfer clay to the standard gauge network. In 1907, the tramway was abandoned after 101 years of service.

The quay at Middlebere Creek has fallen into disrepair and almost vanished. Some stone sleepers remain in place today, complete with holes where the rails used to be fixed, whilst others have been reused as paving stones at various locations. Others can be found in the walls at Middlebere Farm. In many places the route across Hartland moor can be traced.

=== Newton Tramway ===
In May 1854 a railway opened from the clay pits at Newton to Goathorn Pier on South Deep in Poole Harbour. The Admiralty had given permission for the building of the pier in 1852. The railway was initially horse worked and built at 3 ft (914 mm) gauge but was re-gauged to 3 ft 9 in (1,143 mm) to take a Steam locomotive that was built by Stephen Lewin of Poole Foundry in about 1870. The engine was named "Corfe" but was nicknamed "Tiny" because of its size. The nickname became its real name. An engine shed was built at Newton to house "Tiny" and was located alongside clay workers' cottages. The water required for "Tiny" was obtained by hand pump from a well to the south of the engine shed. The coal for "Tiny" would have been brought in by ship via Goathorn Pier. In 1907 the railway was joined to Norden and part of it became the "Fayles Tramway".

=== Fayles Tramway ===
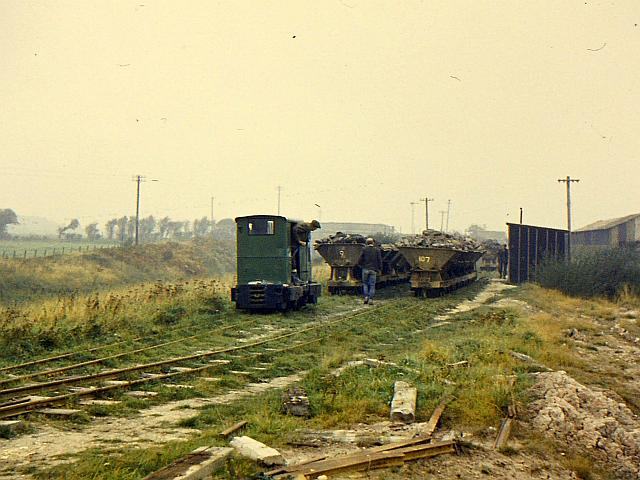
Narrow gauge diesel locomotives at Eldons Sidings of Fayles Tramway

In about 1907 the Middlebere tramway fell out of use and a link to Newton was constructed to a gauge of 3 ft 9 in (1,143 mm), rails were laid from a point just southeast of the Slepe Road bridge at Norden across the Heath to join the Newton tramway, giving an outlet to Goathorn Pier. The line was 5 3/4 miles (9.3 km) in length, another locomotive was purchased. The railway enabled some of the clay from Norden to be exported via Goathorn pier and in turn some of the clay from Newton to exit Purbeck by train via Eldon Sidings. The railway was also used in 1924 to construct the Training Bank to maintain a navigable approach to Poole Harbour. It was constructed from limestone blocks (Portland and Purbeck stone) which were carried by the railway from Norden to Goathorn where they were loaded on to barges.

The line was constructed using flat-bottomed rail spiked to wooden sleepers with earth ballast in a conventional way. There was an additional locomotive shed at Norden and trackwork included a short branch at Bushey. Other features included a wooden bridge over the Corfe River.

By 1937 the Newton line seems to be little used. The pier at Goathorn ceased to be worked with the Second War requiring the peninsula as part of a bombing range. Much of the line that crossed Newton Heath was taken up in 1940 and there was no working north of the engine shed at NordenThe line was abandoned in 1937 and clay then left by lorry or via the Swanage Branch Line. In 1948 the complex at Norden was regauged to 1 ft 11 1/2 in (597 mm). To work the narrow-gauge line one steam-engine and several internal combustion engined rail tractors were purchased. The steam-engine was "Russell" a 2-6-2T Hunslet (1906) with a chequered history. In the final years of the Norden system a number of Ruston & Hornsby 48DL class 0-4-0 engines operated on the line, numbers 392117, 175413 and 179889, also used for a while was a Motor Rail Simplex (c/n 5252).

After the closure of Eldon sidings all clay exports were via lorry. For several years the clay was carried from the mines across the A351 by trains to the "Lorry Drop". It was realised that the lorries could take the clay directly from the mines and the cost of maintaining a railway system avoided. The transhipment buildings were raised to accommodate the lorries beneath them and in the early 1970s the railway system sold partly into preservation and the rest scrapped. Use of narrow gauge railways continued underground at Norden No 6 & 7 mines until all mining operations ceased in 1999.

== Future ==
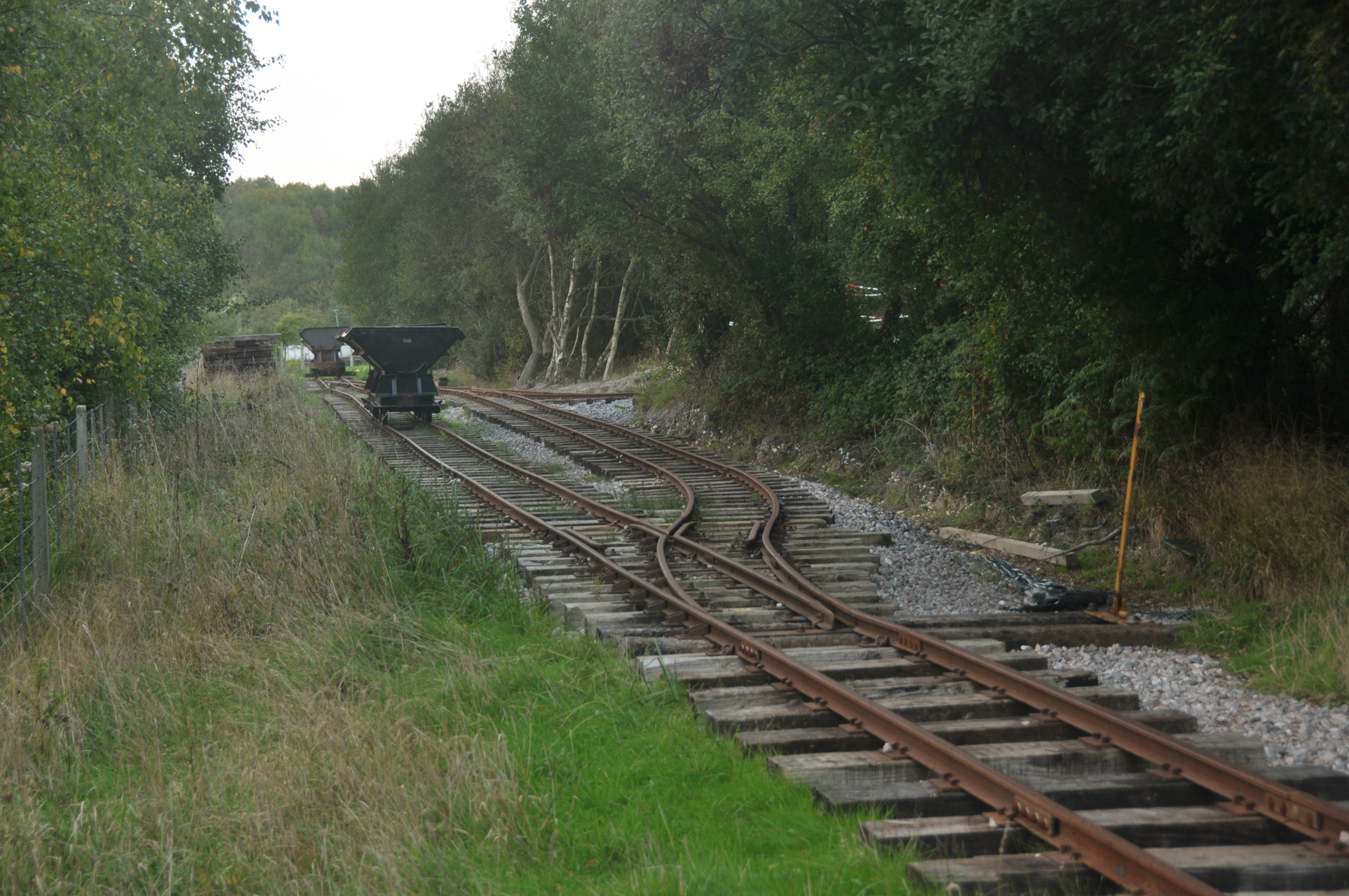
Relaid track parallel to the Swanage Railway

In 2014 the Purbeck Mining Museum set up a plan in conjunction with its governing body the Swanage Railway Trust for a forward plan for the future. The plan involved opening the museum on more days to boost numbers and increase access to areas of the museum previously restricted. Its first priority was to improve interior displays. The plan is now complete and now one of its main priorities is to restore the skew arch bridge over the Swanage Railway and to enable access to the old Matchams clay pit on land at Norden South, this will allow the Museum the possibility of expanding the 2 ft (610 mm) gauge demonstration clay trains on special event days and future plans include operating a simple passenger service to various parts of the museum site. The museum also wants to develop a building for Secundus and wagon 28, both are currently in store

== Rolling Stock ==
All 2 ft (610 mm) gauge unless otherwise stated.

=== Steam locomotives ===
Number and name	Wheel arrangement	Builder	Notes	Photograph
Secundus	0-6-0WT	G. E. Belliss and Co.	2 ft 8 in (813 mm) gauge, Not operational. Currently not on display and in store.	

=== Diesel locomotives ===
Number and name	Wheel arrangement	Class	Notes	Photograph
283871	4wDM	48DL Ruston Hornby Diesel	Operational.	
392117	4wDM	48DL Ruston Hornby Diesel	Operational, on loan to museum.	

=== Carriages ===
Number	Type	Notes	Photograph
-	8 seater passenger carriage	Restored.	

=== Goods wagons ===
Number	Type	Notes	Photograph
-	1 ft 10 in (559 mm) gauge Underground mine tubs	12 in total, Currently being restored.	
28	2 ft 8 in (813 mm) 4-wheeled wagon	Built for the Furzebrook Railway, Awaiting restoration.	
-	Goathorn Wagon Flat	Operational.	
140	Hudson Skip	Currently being Scrapped.	
16	Hudson Skip	Awaiting Restoration.	
41	Allens Skip	Restored	
-	Allens Skip	Restored.	
31	Flatbed	Awaiting Restoration.	
38	Flatbed	Restored.	
-	Hudson Skip Chassis	Awaiting Restoration.	
-	Hudson Skip Chassis	Restored.	
-	Small V skip	Awaiting Restoration.	
-	Ballast forward tipper	Awaiting Restoration.	
-	Drop sided wagon	Restored.	
-	Hudson Skip	Under Restoration.	
-	Small V skip	Awaiting Restoration.	
-	Wide chassis wagon	Awaiting Restoration.	
-	Wide chassis wagon	Awaiting Restoration.	
-	Wide chassis wagon	Awaiting Restoration.	
-	Ex RN Trecwn Explosive Wagon (Converted to PW van)	Restored.	
-	Hudson skip	Awaiting Restoration.	
-	Lister bogie flatbed	Restored	
