= David Lewer =

English author, architect, historian and choral musician (1919-2005)

- Born: 22 January 1919
- Died: 16 April 2005 (aged 86)
- Citizenship: British
- Occupations: English author, architect, historian and choral musician

David James Lewer (Swanage, Dorset, 22 January 1919 – 16 April 2005) was an English author, architect, historian and choral musician.

Born in 1919 to parents James William Lewer and Emily (née Brown), David was the younger of two siblings. His sister Phillis was born in 1917, but died in 1950.

Lewer became a chorister at the Temple Church, London in 1931, remaining in the choir until 1933. Unlike most Temple choristers, he had already begun at City of London School before being accepted into the choir, and after his voice broke in 1933, he remained connected with the church for much of his life, initially as Honorary Librarian and a member of the Templars Union, the association of old choristers. Later, he joined the gentlemen of the choir as a Tenor, and remained a regular member of the choir until at least 1982 and the retirement of 'The Doctor', Sir George Thalben-Ball. He remained an occasional member for several years after this. Following his retirement to Dorset, he was an active participant in the choir of St George's Church, Langton Matravers.

After qualifying as an architect, Lewer spent his career in architectural practice. Even after his retirement, he continued to work, designing and project managing the building of his final residence, Quality Court in Langton Matravers, Dorset, which was built partially in the garden of his previous residence, Old Forge Cottage.

Starting after the Second World War, Lewer also began to write factual books and pamphlets on a variety of subjects, but specialising in his two great loves: Swanage and its history, and the Temple Church. His most famous work, 'A Spiritual Song', is a comprehensive history of the Temple Church choir, and was published by the Templar's Union, the association of ex-choristers, and was conceived particularly as a memorial to Alfred Capel Dixon: he was granted access to the historical records of two of the Inns of Court, the Inner Temple and the Middle Temple by then sub-treasurer of the Inner Temple, Commander Rodney Flynn. It is notable for containing the complete list of choristers from the foundation of the current choir model under Edward John Hopkins in 1842 up until the date of publication: a list which was updated in subsequent reprints.

== Publications ==
His publications included:

- The Lea Valley - Footpath guides (1948, reprinted 2011)
- A Spiritual Song: The Story of the Temple Choir and a History of Divine Service in the Temple Church, London - pub The Templar's Union (1961)
- The Temple Church - Pitkin Pride of Britain Books (1967, reprinted 1971)
- Curiosities of Swanage: Or, Old London by the Sea (with J. Bernard Calkin) (1971)
- The Temple Church - Pitkin Pictorials (1973)
- Story of Swanage: History from Early Times - Harewood Publications (1986)
- Swanage (with John Mowlem) - Dorset Publishing Co (1989)
- Hardy in Swanage: The Author's life on the Coast - Dorset Publishing Co (1990)
- Swanage Past (with Denis Smale) - Phillimore & Co Ltd (1994, reprinted 2004)
- The Temple Church in London (with Richard Dark) - Historical Publications Ltd (1997)

He was closely associated with the Tithe Barn Museum in Swanage, and was an active fundraiser for the organisation. Throughout his life, he remained close to the affairs of the Temple Church and its choir, and in the early 70's took over the running of 'Temple Camps', summer holidays for the choristers of the church, from his great friend Capt A C Dewar. This ensured he was known to generations of boys.

His funeral, at Poole Crematorium, Dorset, was well attended by many Old Templars.
