= Swanage Pier Tramway =

Coordinates: 50.6074°N 1.9527°W

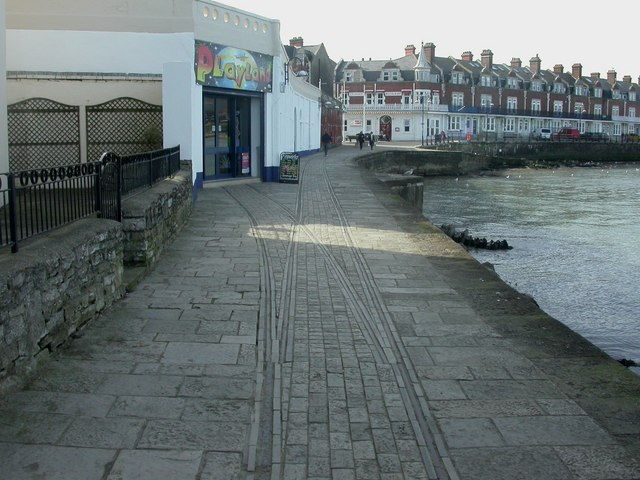

Overview
- Headquarters: Swanage
- Locale: Dorset, England
- Dates of operation: c.1858–1930s

Technical
- Track gauge: 4 ft 8 1/2 in (1,435 mm) (until 1897). 2 ft 6 in (762 mm).

The Swanage Pier Tramway was a narrow gauge tramway in the port town of Swanage, in the English county of Dorset. It opened about 1858 and closed in the 1930s.

== Overview ==
From the 12th century, the Swanage area was well known for the quarrying of Purbeck Marble, actually a hard wearing form of limestone. Much of this was shipped out through Swanage, originally being loaded into small vessels from horse carts driven into the waters of Swanage Bay. In 1858 a pier, now known as the Old Pier, was built in deeper water and linked to the stone stores on the waterfront by a horse-drawn tramway. The line survived in use until the 1930s, latterly being used to carry fish from the pier to a fish store built alongside the line around 1855.

== Track gauge ==
Existing evidence on the ground shows that the tramway was of 2 ft 6 in (762 mm) narrow gauge, although it was originally 4 ft 8 1/2 in (1,435 mm) standard gauge. The tramway was re-gauged prior to the opening of the public pier. There is little evidence that mechanical traction was ever used on the line.

== The site today ==
About 100 metres (110 yd) of track still exist, embedded in the footway that links the centre of Swanage with the later built Steamer Pier: the remnants start at the Swanage Museum & Heritage Centre. The timber supports of the Old Pier also still exist, albeit in a derelict condition.

== LSWR line ==
The Swanage Pier Tramway should not be confused with a standard gauge tramway opened by the London and South Western Railway (LSWR) as an extension of one of the sidings at Swanage railway station. This connected to a stone store in the same vicinity of those served by the pier tramway, but the two lines were never connected.
