= Swanage railway station =

Heritage railway station in England

Swanage
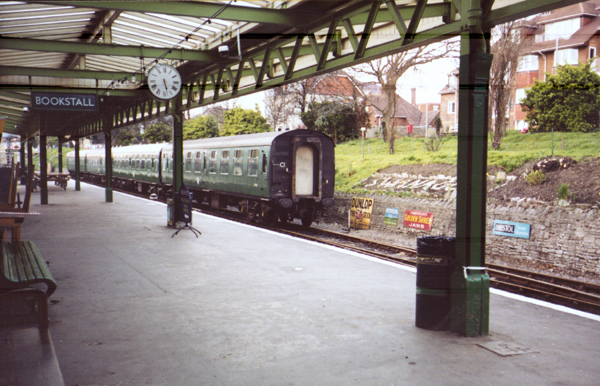
- Swanage station

General information
- Location: Swanage, Dorset; England
- Coordinates: 50.61020°N 1.96145°W
- Grid reference: SZ029789
- System: Station on heritage railway
- Platforms: 2

History
- Original company: Swanage Railway

Key dates
- 1885: Opened
- 1972: Closed by British Rail
- 1982: Reopened by Swanage Railway
Location

Swanage railway station is located in Swanage, on the Isle of Purbeck in the English county of Dorset. Originally the terminus of a London and South Western Railway (L&SWR) branch line from Wareham, the line and station were closed by British Rail in 1972. It has since reopened as a station on the Swanage Railway, a heritage railway that currently runs from Norden station just north of Corfe Castle to Swanage station. It now also runs to Wareham on certain services, but not on regular services.

== History ==
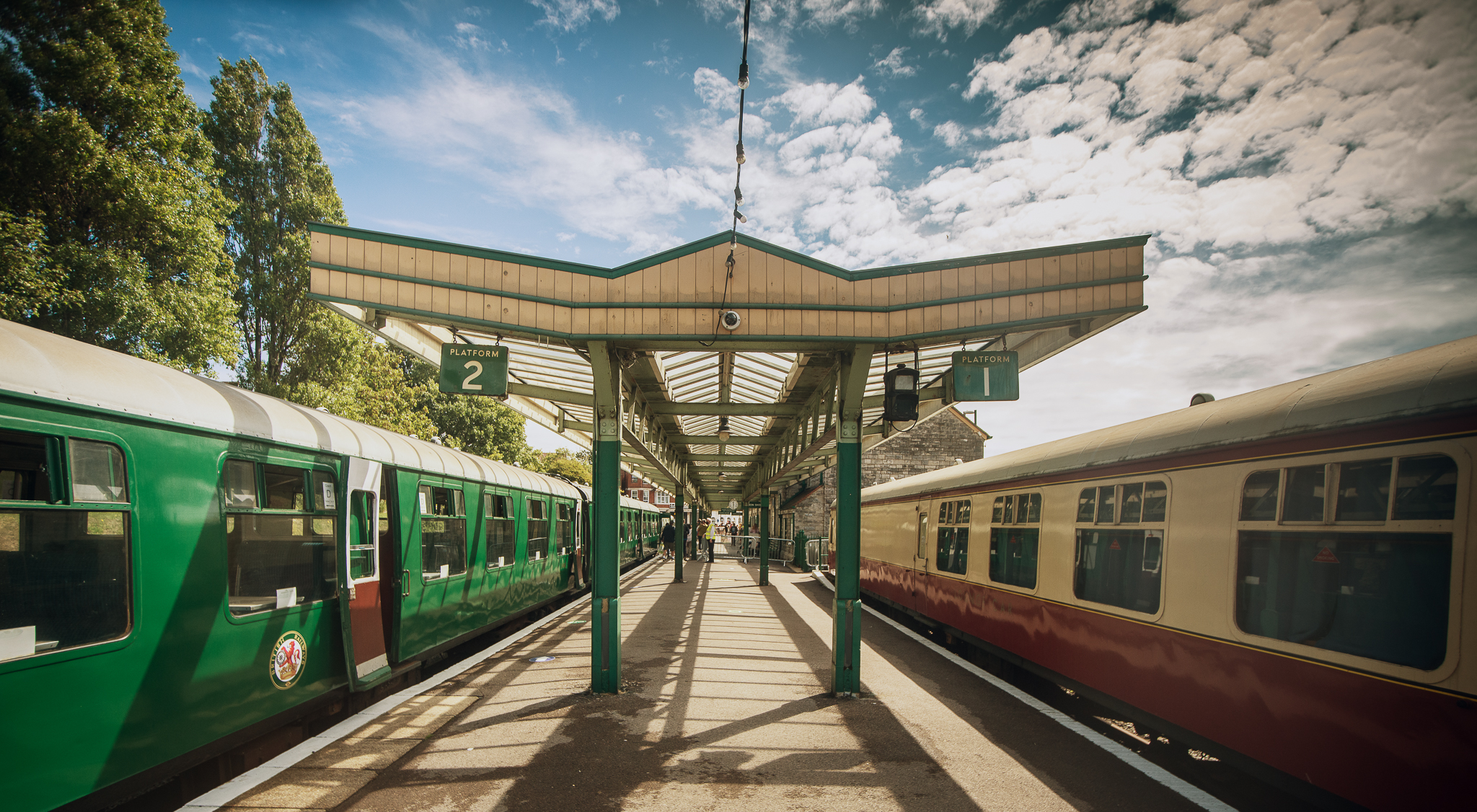
Platforms 1 and 2

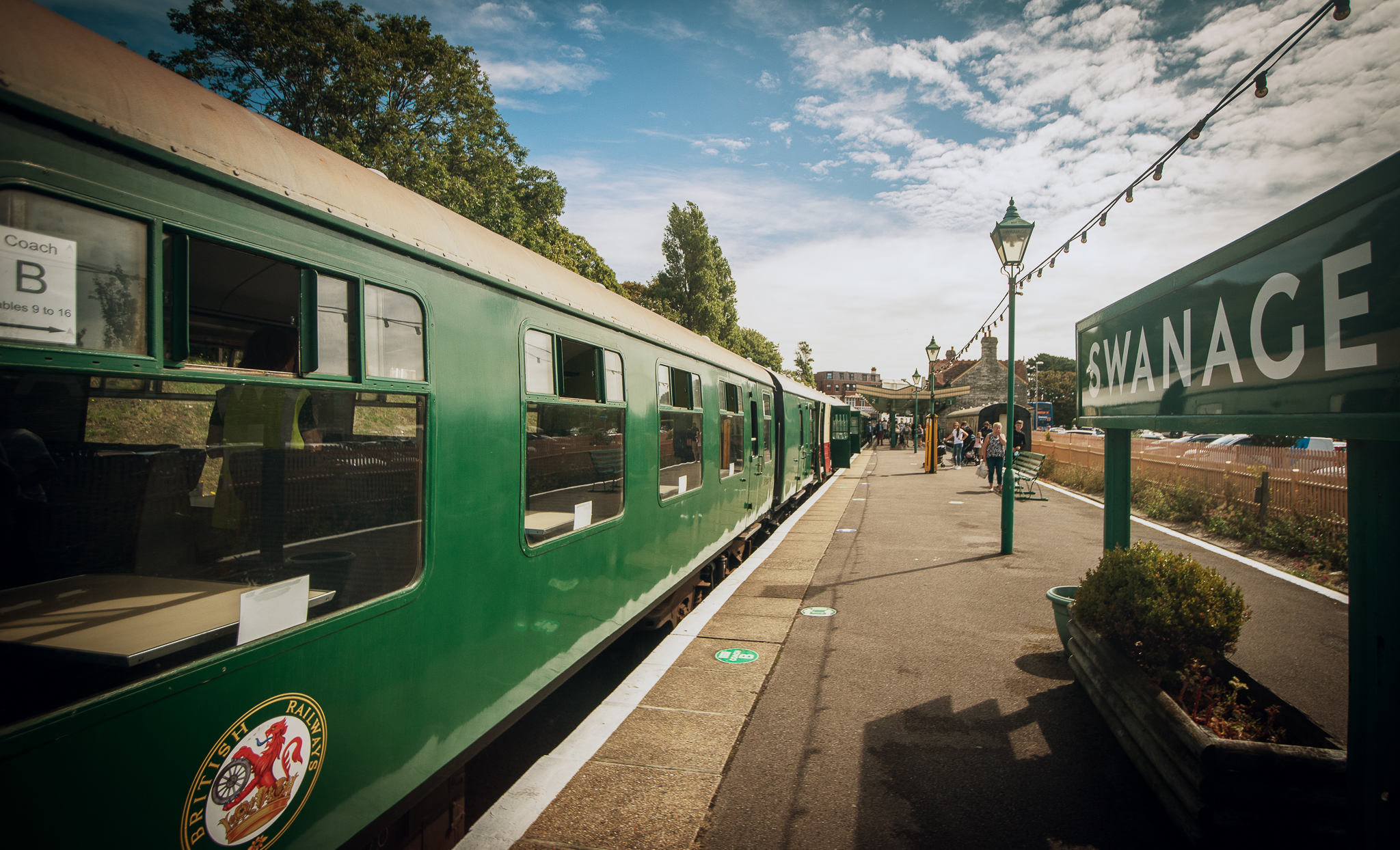
Station signage on the platform

Swanage lies at the tip of the Isle of Purbeck, a peninsula bordered by the English Channel to the south, and by the marshy lands of the River Frome and Poole Harbour to the north and east. Since the 12th century, the area around Swanage has been well known for the Purbeck Marble that was mined locally and shipped out by sea. The presence of this industry, together with the Purbeck Ball Clay works in the area to the north, attracted railway promoters once the L&SWR main line reached Wareham in 1847. Several schemes were promoted and failed, but eventually the Swanage Railway received its Act in 1881 and opened on 20 May 1885.

Swanage station was constructed with two platform tracks, on either side of a single passenger platform. The longer of these tracks had a run round loop, and was flanked by a station building built in the grey Purbeck stone. A single track goods shed provided facilities for general merchandise, and a turntable, coaling stage and single track locomotive shed were provided for use by the steam locomotives that operated the line. In order to handle the anticipated volumes of stone traffic, a four track goods yard was constructed. One of the lines in the goods yard was extended as a tramway running in a narrow alley behind Station Road to a stone store near the waterfront. This tramway should not be confused with the earlier Swanage Pier Tramway that linked nearby stone stores to a pier in Swanage Bay.

Towards the end of the 19th century, Swanage started to develop as a tourist resort. Through coaches and through trains were operated to Swanage from both London and from the industrial towns of the Midlands and North of England. To accommodate this traffic, the station was extensively altered in 1937, with extensions to the station buildings using matching materials and in a design blending well with the 1885 original. The new facilities provided a parcels office, ticket office, a waiting hall, a newsagents shop, and an extended goods shed. However the use of lorries to transport the ball clay, Purbeck stone, and Portland stone, and the increase in private car ownership in the second half of the 20th century eventually made the line unprofitable. Closure was first proposed in 1967, and despite local opposition the line finally closed on 3 January 1972. During the final few years of the line's operation under British Rail, passenger train services were operated by two-car Class 205 diesel electric multiple units (also known as type 2H).

After closure, a strong campaign was waged to allow the railway to reopen both as an independent community railway linking with the main line at Wareham and as a steam locomotive operated heritage railway. The Swanage Railway ran its first train in August 1979 from a temporary platform under Northbrook Road bridge up to the council yard. It began operating a steam service at the Swanage end of the line in 1982. The passenger station, goods shed and locomotive facilities have been restored to their 1937 configuration, although the goods yard is now the site of a supermarket.

== Future ==
=== Water Tower Project ===
Swanage Railway recovered a stone based LSWR Water tower from Salisbury and are currently relocating the tower to the South East side of Northbrook Road Bridge. They will also install a spring water extraction system as this will save money in the long-term. The railway is currently dependent upon mains water which damages the boilers of the steam locomotives.

=== National Rail services ===
In 2020, it was announced that the government would provide funding for a feasibility study into reinstating regular passenger services between Wareham and Swanage.

== Services ==
Services run every day from the beginning of April to late October, with weekend only operation in March, November and December. The level of service varies from 6 to 17 trains a day in each direction, depending the season and the day of the week. Northbound, trains operate to stations at Herston (trains stop only on request), Harman's Cross (10 mins), Corfe Castle (20 mins), and Norden (23 mins) also to Wareham on certain services, but not regular service because of signalling issues. Regular summer services to Wareham are planned for 2023.

| Preceding station | Heritage railways | Following station |
|---|---|---|
| Herston Halt towards Norden | Swanage Railway | Terminus |

== Facilities ==
- Station Kiosk (in booking hall) – Open daily.
- Railway Shop – Selling railway books and paraphernalia, open daily.
- Bus Station – Two bus stops where all of Swanage's bus services terminate.
