= Wareham railway station =

Railway station in Dorset, England

Coordinates: 50.693°N 2.115°W

Wareham
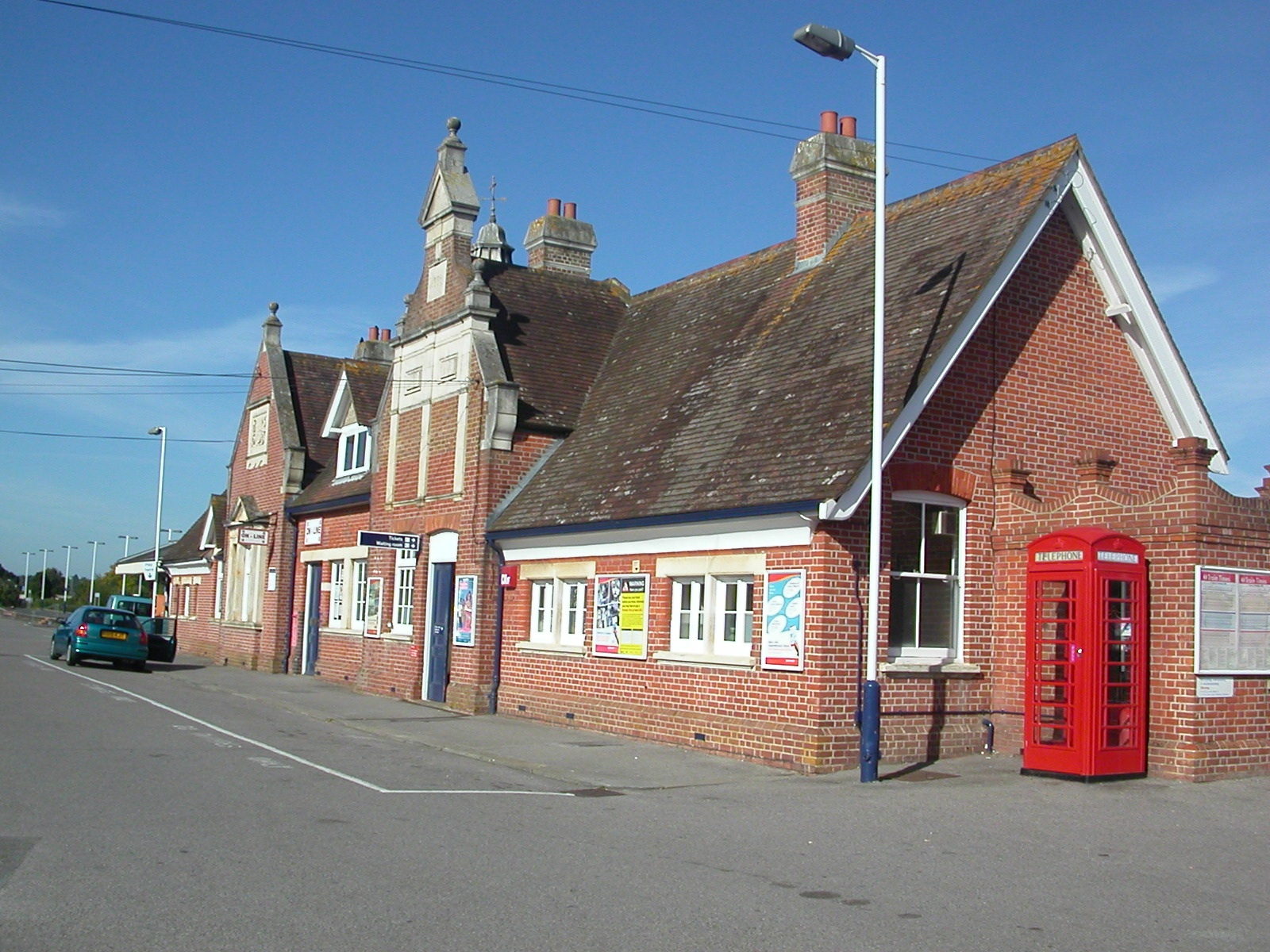
- Main building at Wareham station, on the westbound platform.

General information
- Location: Wareham, Dorset Council; England
- Grid reference: SY919881
- Managed by: South Western Railway
- Platforms: 2

Other information
- Station code: WRM
- Classification: DfT category D

History
- Opened: 4 April 1887

Passengers
- 2020/21: ▼73,038
- 2021/22: ▲0.206 million
- 2022/23: ▲0.253 million
- 2023/24: ▲0.272 million
- 2024/25: ▲0.302 million
Location
Notes
- Passenger statistics from the Office of Rail and Road

Wareham railway station serves the historic market town of Wareham, in Dorset, England. It is situated about 0.6 miles (1 km) north of the town centre and 120 miles 70 chains (194.5 km) down the line from London Waterloo on the South West Main Line. On tickets, the station is printed as "Wareham, Dorset" to avoid confusion with Ware railway station.

== History ==
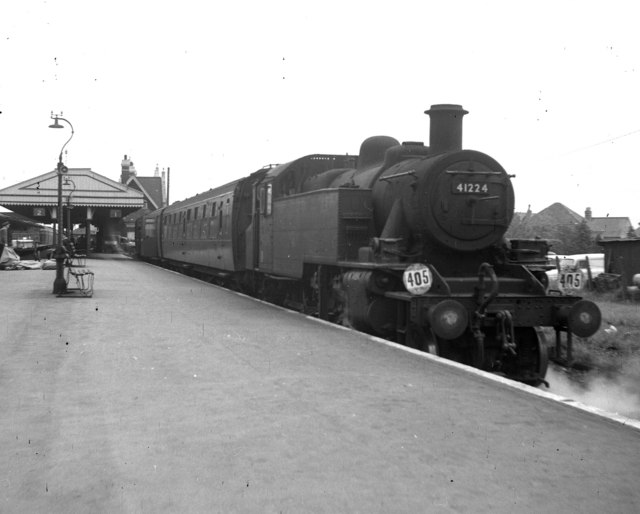
A Swanage branch train in 1966

The original Wareham station was built to serve the Southampton and Dorchester Railway and opened in 1847. The current station opened in 1887, replacing the original station, and was sited east of what is now only a pedestrian crossing but was once a busy road level crossing (the road now bridges the railway)

Until 1967, trains through the station were normally steam hauled. Class 205 (2H) diesel-electric multiple units were used during the final years of British Rail operation on the Swanage branch. Between 1967 and 1988, passenger services on the London-Weymouth line were normally provided by Class 33/1 diesel locomotives with Class 438 coaching stock (also known as 4-TC units). The line was electrified in 1988, using the standard British Rail Southern Region direct current third rail at 750 volts. After electrification, Class 442 electric multiple units were initially used, but these were replaced by Class 444s in 2007.

=== Branch line to Swanage ===
This station had two bay platforms which served the branch line to Swanage from 1885 until 1972, when the branch was closed.

The branch line to Swanage forms part of the preserved Swanage Railway, a steam locomotive-operated heritage railway that currently operates between Swanage and a Park and Ride site at Norden, just north of Corfe Castle.

The rail connection between the Swanage Railway and the Network Rail tracks at Worgret Junction has been restored. On summer Saturdays, trains run through from a number of South Western Railway stations, including London Waterloo and Salisbury through Wareham to Corfe Castle to link with Swanage Railway services.

Heritage services on the line run between Swanage and Norden station, near Corfe Castle. On 13 June 2017, a four-coach diesel-hauled trial service began running to Wareham; this was the first train to work between the two towns since the Swanage branch closed in 1972. Special services operated between Wareham and Swanage on some dates during the summer of 2017 as a trial. A further trial took place in the form of a four trains a day service on Tuesdays, Wednesday, Thursdays and Saturdays between 4 April and 9 September 2023, operated by Swanage Railways.

== Services ==
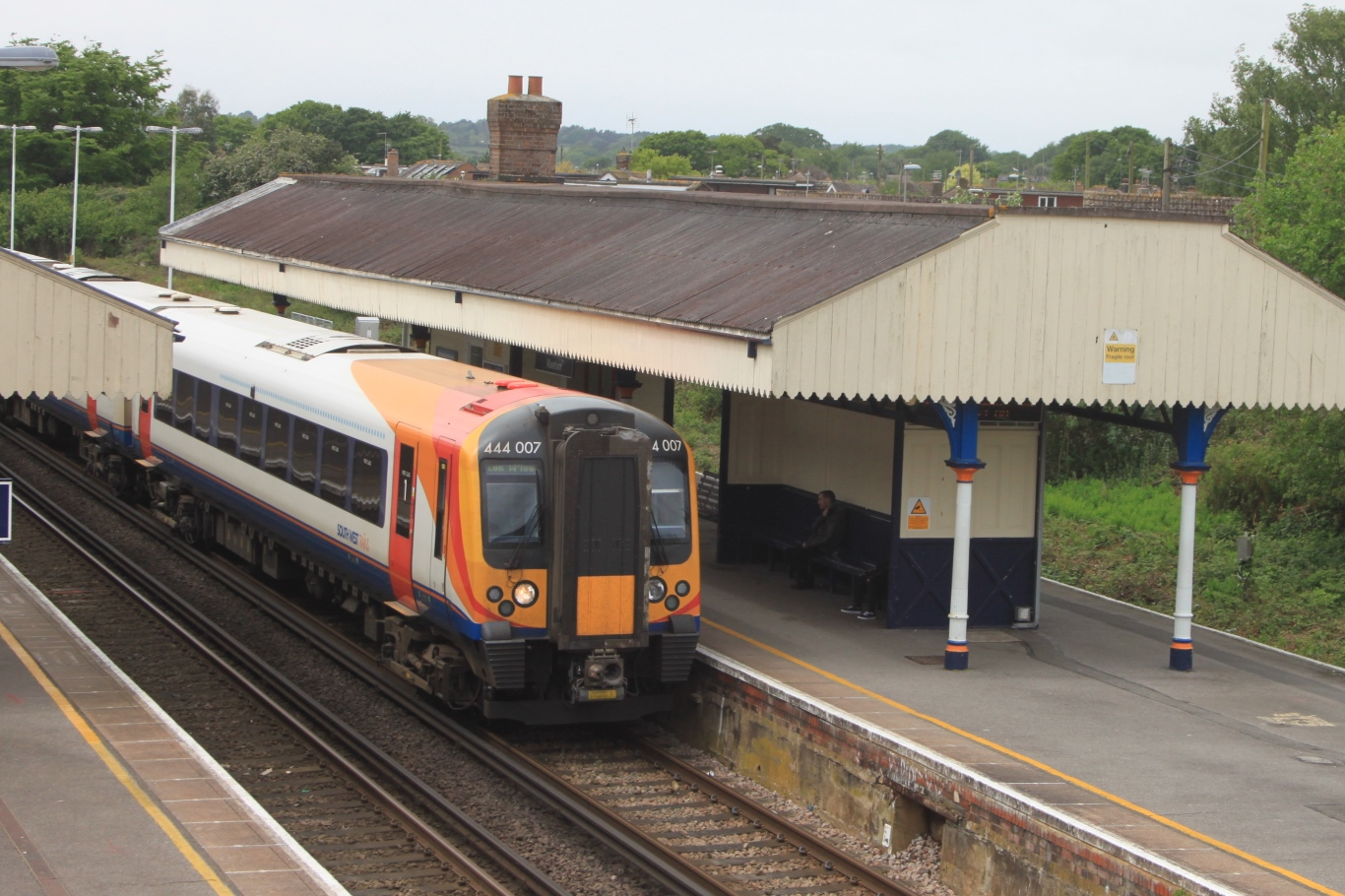
A Class 444 operating a service to London Waterloo

Wareham station is served by one South Western Railway service an hour on each direction on the South West Main Line between London Waterloo and Weymouth, strengthened to twice per hour on Saturdays.

Prior to 9 December 2007, it was the terminus for an hourly local service from Brockenhurst, but this has now been partially replaced by the additional Weymouth service.

Following trials in 2017 and 2023, there are no further plans to operate services on the Swanage Railway to Wareham.

Preceding station	National Rail	Following station
Wool or Dorchester South	South Western Railway; South West Main Line	Holton Heath or Hamworthy
Wool or Dorchester South	South Western Railway; London Waterloo to Corfe Castle; Summer Saturdays only	Corfe Castle
Preceding station	Heritage railways	Following station
Norden towards Swanage	Swanage Railway Special events only	Terminus
