= Middlebere Plateway =

Horse-drawn plateway in Dorset, England

Overview
- Headquarters: Corfe Castle
- Locale: England
- Dates of operation: c.1806–c.1907
- Successor: Fayle's Tramway

Technical
- Track gauge: 3 ft 9 in (1,143 mm)
- Length: 3 1/2 miles (5.6 km)

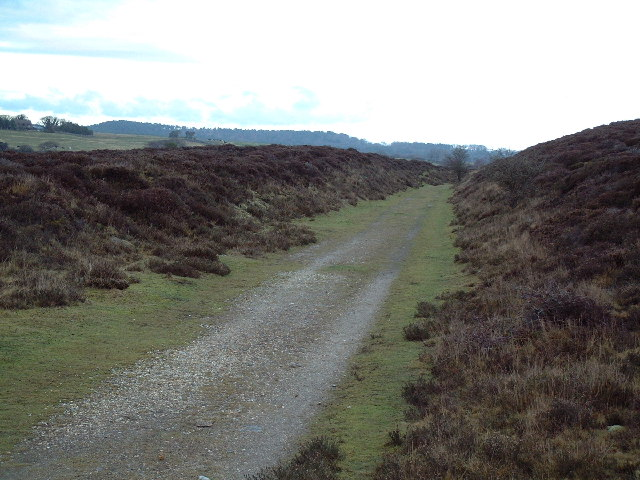
A slight cutting on the route of the plateway across Hartland Moor

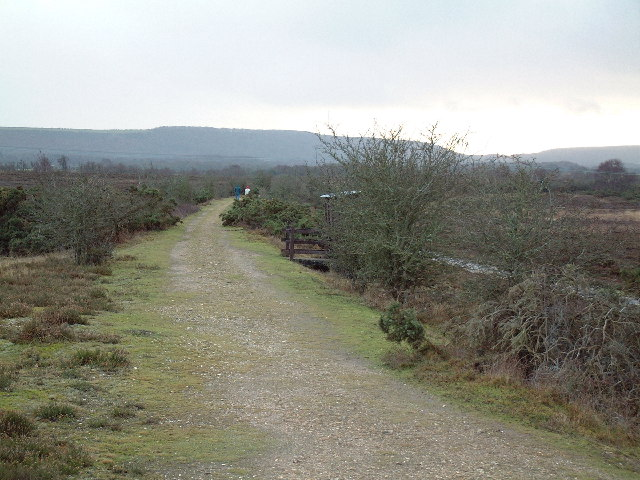
Elsewhere, the route runs on a low embankment

The Middlebere Plateway, or Middlebere Tramway, was a horse-drawn plateway on the Isle of Purbeck in the English county of Dorset. One of the first railways in southern England and the first in Dorset, the plateway was built by Benjamin Fayle, who was a wealthy Irish Merchant based in London and a friend of Thomas Byerley - Josiah Wedgwood's nephew. It was intended to take Purbeck Ball Clay from his pits near Corfe Castle to a wharf on Middlebere Creek in Poole Harbour, a distance of some 3 1/2 miles (5.6 km).

== History ==
Near contemporary accounts indicate that the line was built in 1805 and opened in 1806, and it is present on a map of 1811. On 16 August 1806, Fayle wrote to Wedgwood announcing the opening of the line and a reduction in the price of clay. The engineer was John Hodgkinson, who had worked with his cousin Benjamin Outram, a pioneering railway and canal engineer. Papers held in Corfe Castle Town Museum state that the contractor was named Willis. At the time the manager of the clay pits was Joseph Willis and tenant at Norden Farm, so this points to a possible "self build" by Fayle's men to John Hodgkinson's instructions.

Initially the railway served clay pits to the east side of the road from Wareham to Corfe Castle, but shortly thereafter it was extended under the road to serve clay workings on the other side of the road. There are two tunnels under the road, serving different workings. The northern tunnel carries a plaque on its east face reading BF 1807. The southern tunnel has a plaque on its west face Dated in 1848, but as the tunnel is shown on earlier tithe maps, that is believed to be a rebuilding date. Workshops and a weighbridge were built near New Line Farm to the east of the road and weathering beds were also located here; these were dumps of newly dug clay which had to weather for up to a year to allow the clay to break down to make it workable.

In about 1881, new pits were opened up at Norden to the south east of the New Line Farm works. New track was laid from near the workshop area to these pits, on a route planned to run alongside and to the west of the proposed Wareham to Swanage railway. When the London and South Western Railway line to Swanage was built, a 4 ft 8 1/2 in (1,435 mm) standard gauge exchange siding was laid to allow clay to be transferred from the clay trucks to main-line trucks, but most of the clay continued to be hauled by horses to Middlebere Quay. At the same time a tunnel was provided under the main line railway for use by the plateway to the original workings.

In the early 1900s, the line to Norden clay works had been extended over the main line railway to serve clay pits on its western side. This line was extended across the Wareham to Corfe Castle road by a level crossing to serve further clay pits to the north east. However, by this time the plateway's days were numbered. The channel at Middlebere was silting up, limiting the size of vessel that could approach the quay. The company already had a deeper-water quay at Goathorn on the southern shore of Poole Harbour, used for the export of clay from pits at nearby Newton.

The Middlebere Plateway was abandoned in about 1907, when it was replaced by the Norden & Goathorn Railway, which connected Fayle's clay works at Norden with their works at Newton and thence to Poole Harbour at Goathorn. N&G Railway took over much of the plateway's trackbed in the Norden area, including the exchange siding and the bridge over the main line railway. However the plateway's main route to Middlebere Creek, and the tunnels under the railway and road were all abandoned.

== Description ==
As a plateway, the Middlebere Plateway differed from the edge railway that eventually became the norm, in that the flanges retaining the truck wheels on the line were on the rails (plates) rather than on the wheels. The plates were three feet (0.91 m) long, L-shaped and made of cast iron, weighing 40 lb (18 kg). They were supported on stone sleepers weighing 60–70 lb (27–32 kg); the ends of the plates were held down by nails driven into wooden plugs inserted into holes in the sleepers. The gauge is generally quoted as being about 3 ft 9 in (1,143 mm), although some recent archeological investigations suggest it may have been as narrow as 3 ft 6 in (1,067 mm).

The clay trucks were flange-less. They were hauled by horses and remained so throughout the line's 100-year life. Two horses worked in tandem pulling 5 wagons weighing almost one long ton (1.0 t; 1.1 short tons) each and with a 2-long-ton (2.03 t; 2.24-short-ton) capacity and making 3 round trips a day, giving an annual total of 9,000–10,000 long tons (9,100–10,200 t; 10,000–11,000 short tons). By 1865, an additional team of horses and wagons had been brought into use and passing places constructed to raise the annual tonnage to 22,000 long tons (22,353 t; 24,640 short tons). Horses continued to be used right up until 1946.

The plateway was one of the first users of the patent axle that was designed by John Collinge of Bridge Road, Lambeth. This axle was largely used for road vehicles and a few other applications to rail vehicles. It implies that the wheels rotated on fixed axles, and, until its introduction, wheels had to be removed, and axle arms greased at least once a day when travelling any distance.

== Remains ==
A few remains of the Middlebere Plateway are still visible. The quay at Middlebere Creek has gradually fallen into disrepair and almost vanished. Some of the stone sleepers remain in place today, complete with holes where the rails used to be fixed, whilst others have been reused as paving stones at various locations. Others can be found in the walls at Middlebere farm. In many places the route across Hartland moor can be traced. The tunnel under the Wareham to Corfe road is now used by a stream draining the former clay working and is a listed building, although the north portal was buried when the road was realigned in the 1980s. The iron bridge over the main line railway, first built for the plateway and then used by Fayle's Tramway, still stands.

The site of the clay works at Norden is now the location of the Norden station of the Swanage Railway, a heritage railway that has taken over the track of the Wareham to Swanage main line railway. The land of old clay processing works now provides a park and ride site whereby visitors can park at Norden and ride the train to Corfe Castle or Swanage. The Purbeck Mineral and Mining Museum is situated beside the station and is dedicated to Purbeck clay industry and its associated tramways on the Norden site.

== Bibliography ==
- Kidner, R.W. (2000). The Railways of Purbeck (Third ed.). The Oakwood Press. ISBN 0-85361-557-8.
