= Swanage Pier =

Pier in Swanage, Dorset, United Kingdom

- Swanage Pier in 2026
- Type: Passenger and pleasure pier
- Location: Swanage
- Coordinates: 50°36′32″N 1°57′01″W
- Official name: Swanage Pier
- Owner: Swanage Pier Trust

Characteristics
- Total length: 642.5 feet (195.8 m)

History
- Designer: Eugenius Birch
- Opening date: 1895

Listed Building – Grade II
- Official name: Swanage Pier
- Designated: 16 December 1975
- Reference no.: 1304816

Swanage Pier is a Victorian pier which extends into the southern end of Swanage Bay near the town of Swanage, in the south-east of Dorset. It was built in 1895 for passenger ship services. It is situated on the eastern coast of the Isle of Purbeck, approximately 6 1/4 miles (10.1 km) south of Poole and 25 miles (40 km) east of Dorchester in the United Kingdom.

An older pier, opened 1860, was used by local quarries to ship stone, but it fell into decline with only its timber piles remaining today. They have proven popular to both divers and swimmers who enjoy exploring around the old piles however they must be cautious not to injure themselves on the sharp points of the wood.

== History ==
Swanage Pier Act 1859
- Act of Parliament
- Parliament of the United Kingdom
- Long title: An Act for making a Pier in Swanage Bay in the County of Dorset, and a Tramway in connexion therewith; and for other Purposes.
- Citation: 22 & 23 Vict. c. lxxvii

Dates
- Royal assent: 8 August 1859

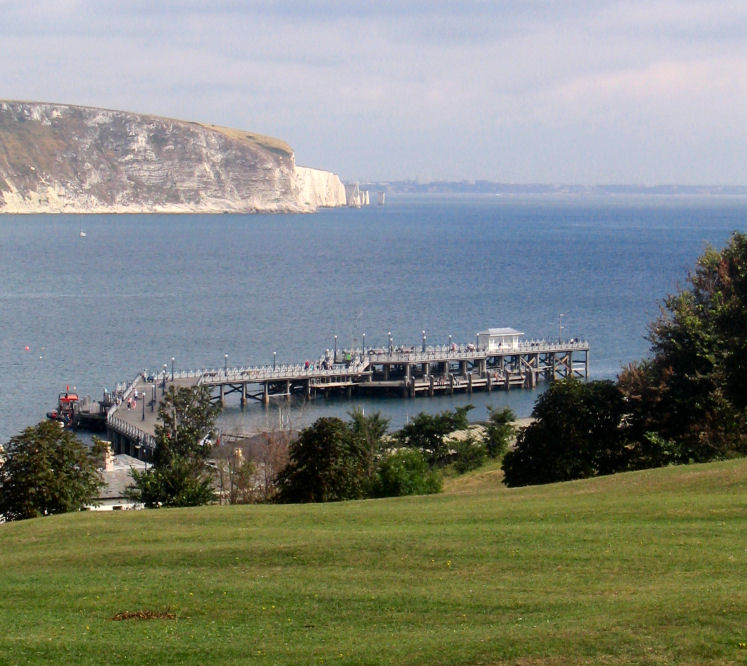
Swanage Pier as seen from the Downs at the southern end of Swanage

The first Swanage Pier, which was 750 feet long, was authorised by the Swanage Pier Act 1859 (22 & 23 Vict. c. lxxvii) and built between 1859 and 1860 for use primarily by the local stone quarrying industry and included a tramway which ran the length of the pier and some way along the seafront. The old tracks can be seen to this day, inset into the seafront walkways.

When local businessman George Burt introduced regular steamer services between Swanage and nearby towns Poole and Bournemouth in 1874, a need became apparent for a second pier to be built primarily for use by passenger steamers. Construction on the new pier began in 1895, and by 1896 was first used by a steamer. The pier was officially opened for traffic on 29 March 1897. While regular steamer services ran on the new pier up until 1966, the older original pier declined along with the stone industry it served some years earlier. Today all that remains of the old pier are some of the timber piles.

After steamer services discontinued in 1966 the remaining pleasure pier also began to fall into disrepair. In 1976 Grade II listed status was awarded to the pier. After a failed attempt to restore the pier by a development firm in 1986, Swanage Pier Trust took over ownership of the pier in 1994.

The trust took on the task of raising over £1,000,000 needed to carry out major restoration work on the pier's piles, timbers and ironwork fittings. It was reopened in 1998.

== The pier today ==
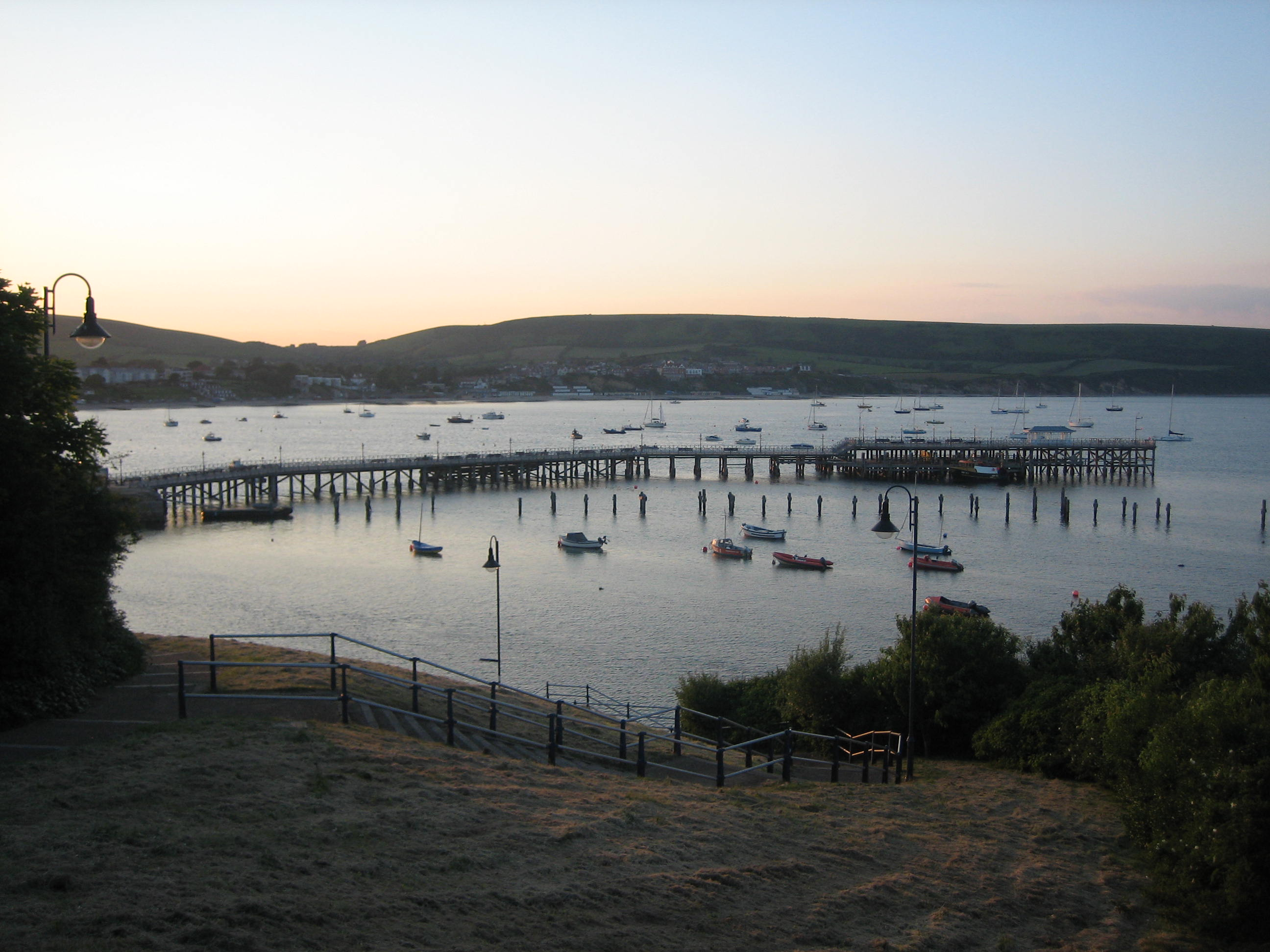
Swanage Pier at dusk

Today the pier is open to the public once again. Small scale ferry services run daily throughout the summer season, mainly to Poole Quay. The pier also hosts a successful diving school, the oldest in the UK, and is visited annually by historic steamers including the Waverley paddle steamer.

The pier is a popular training site for scuba diving because it is one of the few sheltered marine diving sites on the south coast, and it has depths of only 4 metres (13 ft). The Marine Conservation Society South East also use the pier as a location for its training dives during their Marine identification and underwater photography courses, due to the wide range of marine life found under the pier. The site has easy access from adjacent car parks, and it has a nearby dive shop.

The Trust maintains a gift shop an exhibition providing information for visitors. The exhibition houses a small aquarium, which showcases the species of marine life that can be found under the pier. These can be found in Marine Villas which at the shore-end of the pier. There is also the 1859 Pier Cafe & Bistro for refreshments. The pier receives over 100,000 visitors a year.

The restored pier was awarded the Pier of The Year award in the spring of 2012 by the National Piers Society. It is a Grade II listed building.

The BBC's adaptation of EM Forster's novel Howards End (2017) used Swanage Pier as a location.

Awards and achievements
Preceded by Grand Pier, Weston-super-Mare	National Piers Society; Pier of the Year; 2012	Succeeded by Clevedon Pier
