= Swanage Railway =

Heritage railway in Dorset, England

Coordinates: 50.61353°N 1.98235°W

Purbeck line
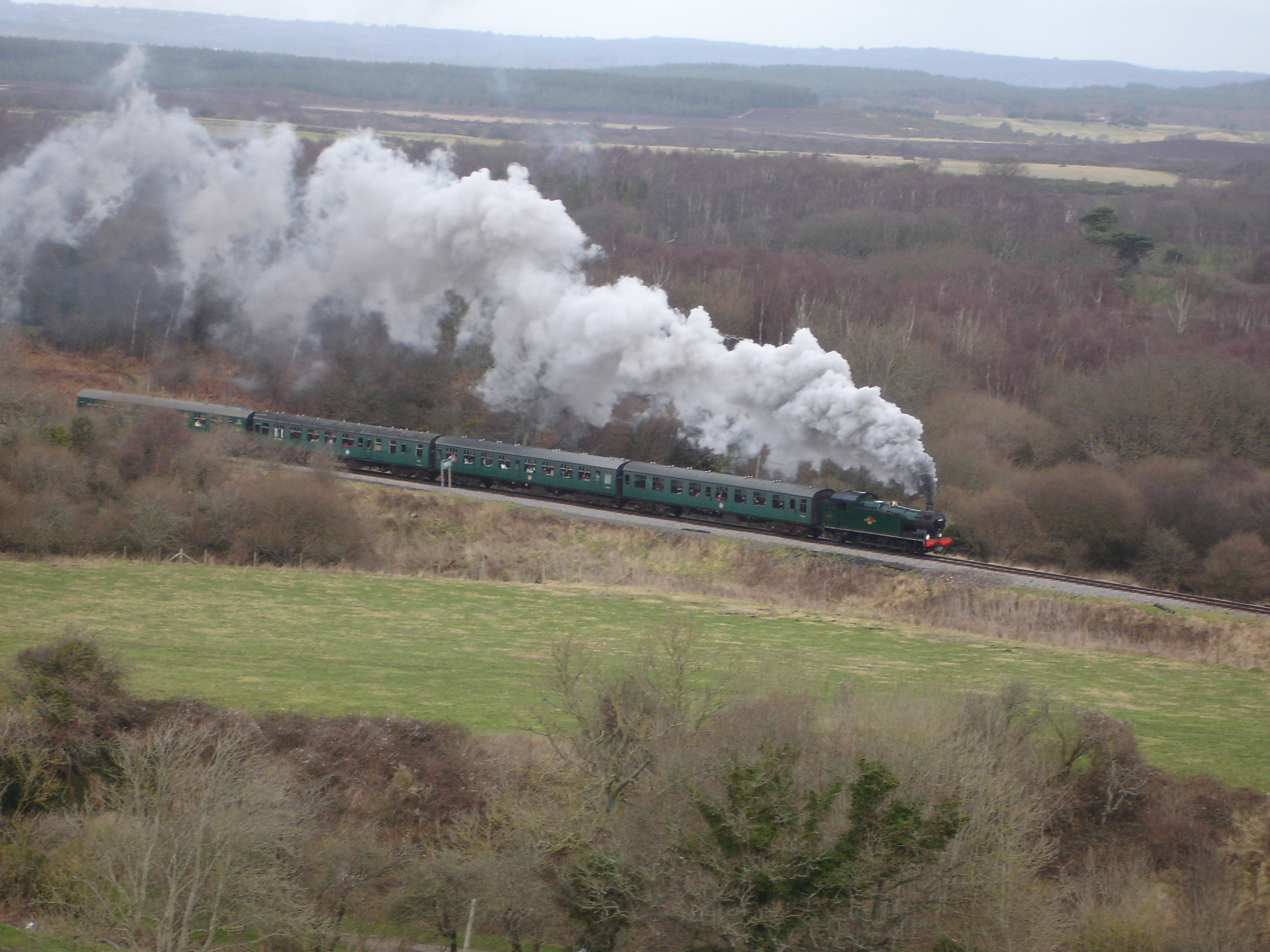
- 56XX Tank No.6695 on the Swanage Railway viewed from Corfe Castle
- Terminus: Wareham; Norden; Swanage

Commercial operations
- Built by: Swanage Railway Company
- Original gauge: 4 ft 8 1/2 in (1,435 mm) standard gauge

Preserved operations
- Stations: 5
- Length: 9.5 miles (15.3 km)
- Preserved gauge: 4 ft 8 1/2 in (1,435 mm) standard gauge

Commercial history
- Opened: 20 May 1885
- Closed: 1 January 1972

Preservation history
- 1979: Line re-opened at/alongside King George's playing fields
- 1980: Steam returns to the Swanage Line, officially
- 1982: Swanage station re-opens officially
- 1984: Herston Halt opens to the public
- 1988: Swanage Line extends to Harman's Cross
- 1989: Harman's Cross opened officially
- 1993: Corfe Castle and Norden Park and Ride extension completed
- 2009: Swanage Line sees first public through passenger service between London Victoria via Wareham and Swanage since closure
- 2014: Lease signed for entire line from Swanage to Worgret Junction
- 2017: Regular passenger service on entire line from Swanage to Wareham
- Headquarters: Swanage

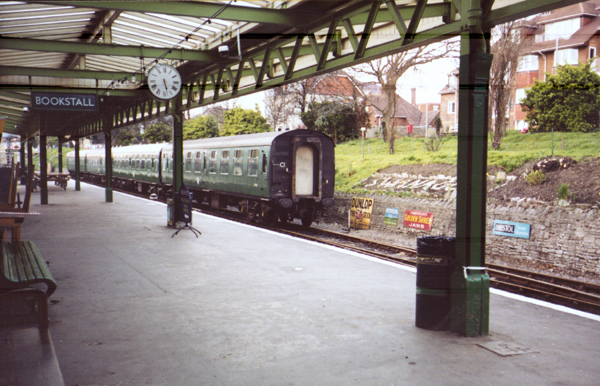
Swanage station is decorated with railway memorabilia.

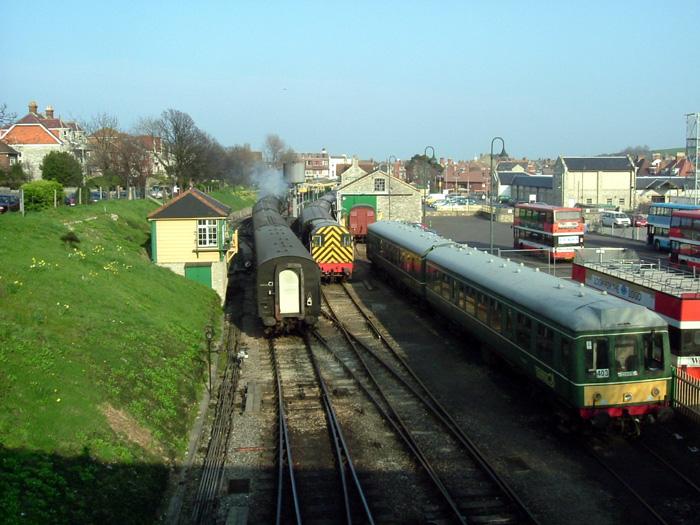
Swanage station

The Swanage Railway, also known as the Purbeck line, is a railway branch line between Wareham and Swanage in the county of Dorset, United Kingdom. The railway line opened in 1885 and is now operated as a heritage railway.

The independent company which built it was amalgamated with the larger London and South Western Railway in 1886. The passenger service was withdrawn in 1972, leaving a residual freight service over part of the line handling mineral traffic.

After the passenger closure, a heritage railway group revived part of the line; it too used the name Swanage Railway and now operates a 9.5-mile (15.3 km) line which follows the route of the former line from Wareham to Swanage with stops at Norden, Corfe Castle, Harman's Cross and Herston Halt. It provides a regular park-and-ride service, normally steam-hauled, from Norden to the sea at Swanage including Corfe Castle village and ruins of Corfe Castle. In 2023, regular trains ran through from Wareham (with National Rail connections) to Swanage.

== Original railways ==
=== Early industry ===
The Isle of Purbeck had extensive quarrying and ball clay activities before Victorian times; some of the clay was processed locally, but much of the mineral output was transported away for use elsewhere. Movement of heavy minerals was chiefly by coastal shipping, and in some cases simple tramways were built for movement within the quarries and to the various loading points situated within the natural Poole Harbour.

=== By-passed by the main line ===
The Southampton and Dorchester Railway opened its main line through Wareham in 1847; it was worked by the London and South Western Railway (LSWR), and amalgamated with the LSWR in 1848. The new line gave the area a through railway connection to London, but it did not come close enough to influence the mineral traffic, which for the time being was mostly conveyed by coastal shipping, as before.

The building of the main line railway through Wareham encouraged several schemes to connect Swanage or the mineral workings in Purbeck, but they failed to gain the support they needed.

=== Swanage Pier Tramway ===
Stone was exported from Swanage by coastal shipping as before, having been quarried on, or mined in, the Isle of Purbeck. The actual loading of the vessels was primitive, and Captain Moorsom, chief engineer of the Southampton and Dorchester line, encouraged local promoters to found the Swanage Pier and Tramway Company, which obtained an authorising act of Parliament, the Swanage Pier Act 1859 (22 & 23 Vict. c. lxxvii), on 8 August 1859. John Mowlem was prominent in generating local support. The scheme involved about 4 miles (6.4 km) of line, running on to the pier at Swanage, from which coastal vessels would be loaded directly.

In fact, only a short section was built, from the pier to an area on the sea front called The Bankers where stone blocks were prepared for transit. Horse traction only was used.

A second jetty, forming a fork, was added to the pier in 1896, to cater for the growing pleasure steamer passenger business, and the truncated tramway was re-gauged in about 1900 to the track gauge of 2 ft 6 in (750 mm). It was used for bunkering the pleasure steamers, but it fell into disuse at the end of the 1920s.

=== Connecting to the main line ===
Swanage Railway Act 1881
- Act of Parliament
- Parliament of the United Kingdom
- Long title: An Act to incorporate a Company for the construction of the Swanage Railway and for other purposes.
- Citation: 44 & 45 Vict. c. clix

Dates
- Royal assent: 18 July 1881

Text of statute as originally enacted

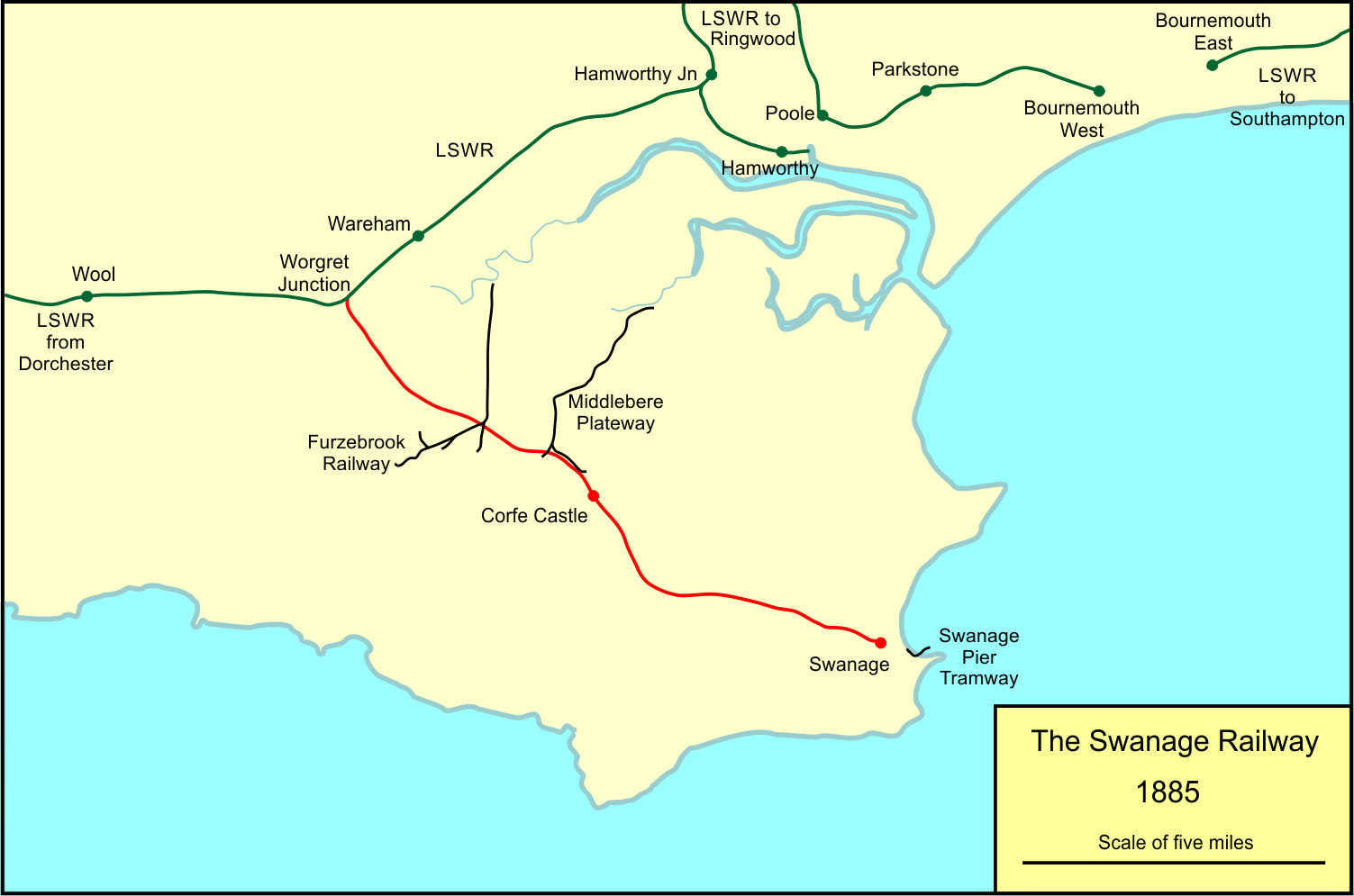
Map of the Swanage Railway at opening

A scheme for a branch line was successful: the Swanage Railway obtained an authorising act of Parliament, the Swanage Railway Act 1881 (44 & 45 Vict. c. clix), on 18 July 1881, with share capital of £90,000 and permitted debenture borrowings of £30,000. It was built under the supervision of consulting civil engineer W. R. Galbraith.

The line was opened on 20 May 1885 and was operated from the start by the LSWR. The branch diverged from the main line at Worgret Junction, over one mile (1.6 km) west of Wareham station; the branch was 10 1/4 miles (16.5 km) in length and single track. An extension from Swanage station to the pier tramway had been authorised by the act, and would be built "if required by the LSWR", but the larger company did not activate this requirement and the pier line was not proceeded with.

The branch intersected the pre-existing Furzebrook Railway, a narrow gauge industrial tramway concerned with conveying ball clay to a river wharf, and the Middlebere Plateway which conveyed the mineral to Poole Harbour; however the proprietors of those lines were slow to arrange interchange facilities with the Swanage Railway. There was one intermediate station, at Corfe Castle. Gradients were undulating, with a ruling gradient of 1 in 76 or 1 in 80, falling for one mile (1.6 km) from Worgret Junction and then rising to a summit at Furzebrook; falling again to Corfe Castle and rising to a summit about halfway to Swanage, and then falling.

The first train service consisted of five passenger trains each way and a daily goods train; the latter was amalgamated with the passenger service by the operation of mixed trains from 1 August 1885.

The Swanage Railway was amalgamated with the LSWR by the South Western Railway Act 1886 (49 & 50 Vict. c. cx) of 25 June 1886. This merely formalised the de facto position, as the LSWR had taken over Swanage Railway liabilities of £2,914 in 1881 and was effectively its paymaster from then.

The existing small Wareham station east of the level crossing was superseded by a larger station west of it, capable of acting as the junction interchange point. The new station was opened on 4 April 1887.

=== The twentieth century ===
In the first decade of the twentieth century, taking holidays at seaside resorts became a major pastime, and through trains from London were instituted in this period. The train service was gradually augmented; in the winter of 1931 there were thirteen daily passenger trains on the branch. The ball clay and other mineral workings on the Isle of Purbeck had not been connected to the branch at first, but by this time rail connections were made and the minerals were transported away by rail.

The railways of Great Britain were subject to the Railways Act 1922 by which most of them were "grouped", and the LSWR became a constituent of the new Southern Railway. The Transport Act 1947 imposed further reorganisation, taking the railways into national ownership under British Railways in 1948.

In the period after 1945, the local trains on the branch were operated as push and pull trains. Through carriages from Weymouth trains were conveyed by some branch trains and if the branch engine was propelling the branch coaches, the attached main line coaches would be behind the locomotive, which was sandwiched.

In the 1960s, usage of rural branch lines declined rapidly as road transport for both goods and passengers improved. However, the line was not mentioned in the report The Reshaping of British Railways, published in 1963, which recommended the closure of many such lines.

From 1966, steam traction was eliminated from the area, and the branch passenger service was operated by a diesel-electric multiple-unit set of BR Class 205. In 1969, a through train from London was operated on summer Saturdays, worked by a diesel locomotive.

In May 1967, the government announced passenger services to Swanage would end after a review of unprofitable branch lines. In late 1967, British Railways issued a notice that the Swanage line was to be closed by September 1968. However, due to opposition focused on the problems in providing a replacement bus service during the summer months, the closure was deferred. A Department of the Environment Inspector ruled that the line should remain open, but that decision was later overturned by the Secretary of State for the Environment.

The line closed to passenger services from 3 January 1972, this was standard phrasing which meant no trains ran on the 'from' date. Because there was no winter Sunday service, the last trains actually ran on 1 January. Composed of two three-carriage 1957 British Railways diesel-electric multiple units No. 1110 and No. 1124, the last train left Wareham at 9.45pm bound for Swanage.

With 500 passengers on board, who had each purchased a specially printed British Rail Edmondson card ticket costing 50 pence for an adult and 25 pence for a child, the last train departed a gas-lit Swanage station platform at 10.15pm before passing through Corfe Castle at 10.24pm and pulling into Wareham at 10.40pm.

=== Furzebrook ===
At Furzebrook, the railway crossed the mineral tramway belonging to Pike Brothers, known as the Furzebrook Railway; the tramway was used for the transport of ball clay. No connection was made at first, and the Furzebrook line used the track gauge of 2 ft 8½ in (825 mm), but a transfer siding was later installed.

=== Norden ===
The Middlebere Plateway connected for transshipment purposes with the branch line at Norden; the plateway was operated by Benjamin Fayle and his successors. The location was used during World War II for separate War Department sidings in connection with rail mounted artillery guns.

=== After passenger closure ===
When the line closed to passengers, freight continued to operate from Furzebrook Sidings, where Pike Brothers dispatched clay.

In 1978, further sidings were installed at Furzebrook for the loading of crude oil from the Wytch Farm oilfield; the wells were 3 miles (4.8 km) distant, oil being brought to the site by pipeline. The sidings were adjacent to the clay trans-shipment site on the branch.

== Preservation ==
In May 1972, the Swanage Railway Society was formed with the objective of restoring an all-the-year-round community railway service linking to the main line at Wareham, which would be 'subsidised' by the operation of steam-hauled heritage trains during the holidays.

However, during the summer of 1972, BR hired contractors to lift the track between Swanage and Furzebrook sidings. Protests were orchestrated by the Society and an agreement between the Society and BR followed, leading to all the ballast being left in situ plus an extra one-half mile (0.80 km) of track at Furzebrook. The track from Furzebrook to the main-line junction at Worgret remained in use for ball clay traffic, later also serving the oilfield at Wytch Farm. BR had intended to sell the Swanage station site to a property developer, but, after the intervention of Evelyn King, the MP for South Dorset, at the Society's request, it was offered to Swanage Town Council (STC).

At first, neither the Dorset County Council (DCC) nor the STC backed the Society's plans to restore the railway. DCC planned to build a by-pass for Corfe Castle on the railway land, while STC started to demolish Swanage station. To break the impasse, the Railway Society formed two daughter organisations: the Swanage and Wareham Railway Group, composed of local residents prepared to lobby the local authorities, and the Southern Steam Group, to collect historic railway rolling stock and establish a museum of steam and railway technology. In 1975, after many interventions by local residents, the STC finally granted the Society limited facilities on the Swanage station site. In 1975, DCC acquired the railway land between the end of the line at Furzebrook and Northbrook Road bridge in Swanage, and undertook to "give further consideration" to routes for a Corfe Castle by-pass. The Society piloted a successful application by the Southern Steam Group to the Charity Commissioners for charitable status, and subsequently both the Society and the residents' group joined the new Southern Steam Trust.

=== Restoration ===
In 1979, a short line was re-opened the length of King George's playing fields. This was extended, first to Herston Halt, and then to Harman's Cross in 1988, neither of which had been stations previously. In 1995, the railway reopened from Swanage to Corfe Castle and onwards to Norden Park and Ride, another post-BR station. The reopening of the station at Corfe Castle was delayed until Norden was ready, as DCC had concerns about the effects of traffic on Corfe's narrow main street (the A351 road between Wareham and Swanage). On 3 January 2002, the track was temporarily joined with the Furzebrook freight line at Motala and the Purbeck branch line was once again complete, thirty years to the day after it was closed.

=== Motala and Worgret Junction ===
On 8 September 2002, a brand new Virgin CrossCountry Class 220 Voyager diesel multiple unit, no. 220018, became the first mainline train to use the new temporary track, when it made a special journey to Swanage, where it was named Dorset Voyager. On 10 May 2007, the permanent connection with Network Rail network was used for the first time, allowing four ex-BR diesel locomotives running from Eastleigh Works to participate in the diesel gala and beer festival. They were later accompanied by a preserved four-carriage electric Class 423 unit provided by South West Trains.

The first public passenger service between Wareham and Swanage since 1972 was "The Purbeck Pioneer", a 12-coach diesel-hauled railtour from London Victoria on 1 April 2009, with a repeat service on 2 April 2009. The first public passenger-carrying steam service since 1967 was "The Dorset Coast Express" from London Victoria on Saturday 2 May 2009, which was hauled by a Southern Railway Battle of Britain class Bulleid Pacific locomotive number 34067 Tangmere. The first Swanage-to-Wareham steam service since 1967 was "The Royal Wessex" on Monday 4 May 2009, hauled by 34067 Tangmere.

=== Operations ===
Trains operate between Swanage and Norden Park & Ride every weekend and Bank Holiday from January to the end of the year, and every day of the week from Easter to the end of October. Each year during December, the railway runs Santa Special services as a seasonal attraction. At summer peak times, trains operate up to every 40 minutes, which is one of the highest-frequency operations on a heritage railway in the UK.

As well as the main Society, other groups are based at the Railway. The Southern Catering Project Group has railway wagons stored on the railway.

The railway works at Herston, on the outskirts of Swanage, are not physically connected to the running line. Movements of locomotives for overhaul are carried out by road transporter as the Swanage Railway has been unable to reach agreement with local landowners to build a branch connection into Herston Works.

=== Aims of the Society ===
In addition to running the regular service between Swanage, Corfe Castle and Norden, these are:

- The restoration of the rail link between Swanage and Wareham and the re-establishment of a daily service to connect with main line trains. Recreating 11 miles (18 km) between Wareham and Swanage on selected dates, initially in 2017.
- The creation of a comprehensive historical record of steam railways and steam technology in Southern England.

=== Norden – Wareham restoration ===
There were no regular timetabled trains between Swanage and Wareham, as the rail service from Swanage operated only as far as Norden. The Society continued to work with Network Rail and the local authorities to identify suitable rolling stock and the infrastructure needed to enable regular services. In July 2010, DCC and Purbeck District councils voted to allocate up to £3 million over three years, to part-fund re-signalling work by Network Rail at Worgret Junction, which connects the Swanage branch to NR's main line near Wareham. The upgrade enables scheduled train services to operate between Wareham, Corfe Castle and Swanage. Swanage Railway ran its first diesel-hauled passenger train into Wareham station on 13 June 2017, to mark the start of a two-year trial public service using diesel trains operating on 60 days during that summer. Trains with diesel locomotives at each end were used because of delays in the refurbishment of the diesel multiple units (DMUs) planned to operate the service; passenger loadings were good but the cost was uneconomic. In 2018, as the DMUs were still not ready, South Western Railway ran trains to Corfe Castle on summer Saturdays; these were noteworthy for their low price (£10 return from Salisbury and westwards, £5 from Weymouth and Wareham) and involving a record number of reversals for any scheduled service (4, at Yeovil Junction, Yeovil Pen Mill, Weymouth and Wareham). Due to industrial action, these ran on fewer Saturdays than intended. Periodically, railtours from other parts of the country operate over this section.

The Swanage Railway has won the annual Institution of Civil Engineers' (ICE) South West Engineering Award 2017 in ICE's projects costing less than £1 million category. Part of the Swanage Railway's "Project Wareham", the £950,000 work took place over two years between Norden station and half-a-mile short of Worgret Junction: three miles of little-used former Network Rail line restored to a passenger-carrying standard, overgrown embankments and drains cleared, a quarter-mile-long embankment upgraded, and half-a-mile of new railway track laid. The £950,000 work also involved the installation of a level crossing across the Wytch Farm oil field access road near Norden station, and the creation of a nearby road-rail interchange for locomotives and carriages. The interchange construction involved the excavation of 2,500 cubic metres of earth that was recycled and used to extend a quarter-mile-long embankment near Furzebrook.

In 2021, the government announced that the line had been approved for additional funding as part of its "Reverse Beeching" proposals to restore lines closed by the Beeching Report (though the Swanage Railway was not included in the original report). Regular summer services were planned to start in 2022: however, they were then postponed to 2023. A four-day-a-week service was announced to run between 4 April and 10 September 2023.

=== Heritage Coach Project ===
The railway has numerous heritage carriages and a project has been started to restore them. 4 out of the 11 are complete, with 1 currently being worked on:

- LSWR Ironclad Third Corridor No. 728 is awaiting restoration.
- SR Maunsell Open Third No. 1323 is awaiting restoration.
- SR Maunsell Open Third No. 1346 is operational, having entered traffic on 15 October 2022.
- SR Maunsell Open Third No. 1381 is operational, entering service on 16 July 2019.
- SR Maunsell Brake Third No. 2768 is awaiting restoration.
- SR Maunsell Brake Composite No. 6697 is awaiting restoration.
- SR Maunsell Brake Composite No. 6699 is awaiting restoration.
- BR Bulleid Brake Third No. 4365 is operational.
- BR Bulleid Brake Third No. 4366 is undergoing restoration.
- SR Bulleid Composite No. 5761 is operational.
- SR Bulleid Open Third (Restaurant) No. 1457 is currently in use as a workshop

=== Water Tower Project ===
Swanage Railway recovered a stone based LSWR water tower from Salisbury, and is currently relocating the tower to the South East side of Northbrook Road Bridge. It will also install a Spring Water Extraction System which will save money in the longer term because it is currently dependent on treated water from the mains which causes damage to the steam locomotive boilers.

=== Listed status ===
In September 2025 the Swanage loco shed, turntable pit and retaining wall, and the Northbrook Road overbridge were two of seven railway-associated buildings which were grade II listed in the week of the bicentenary of the Stockton and Darlington Railway.

== Rolling stock ==
For a full list of locomotives, carriages and wagons

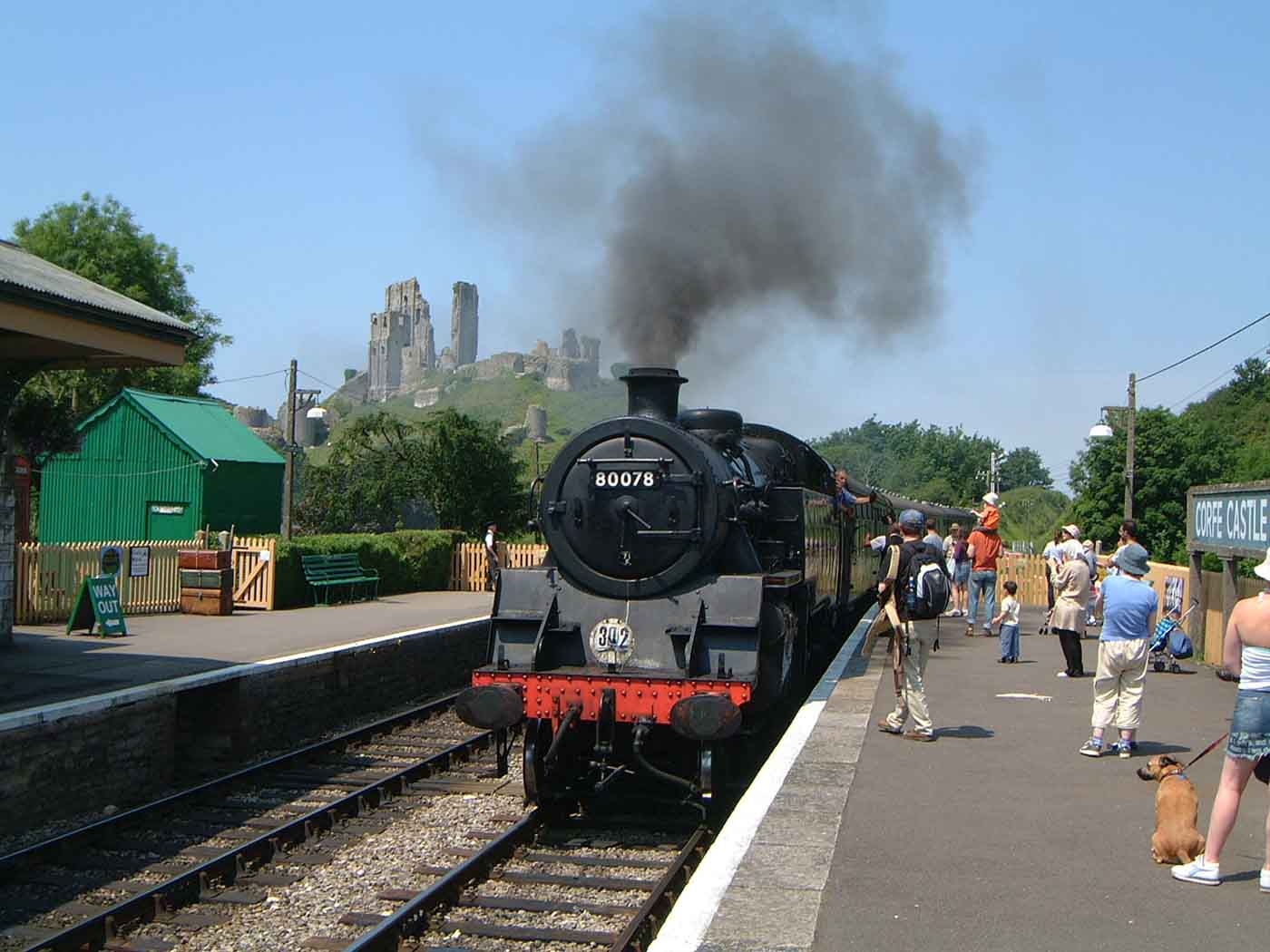
Steam loco 80078 pulls into Corfe Castle station. The castle is visible in the background.
