= Norden railway station (England) =

Railway station in Dorset, England

Norden
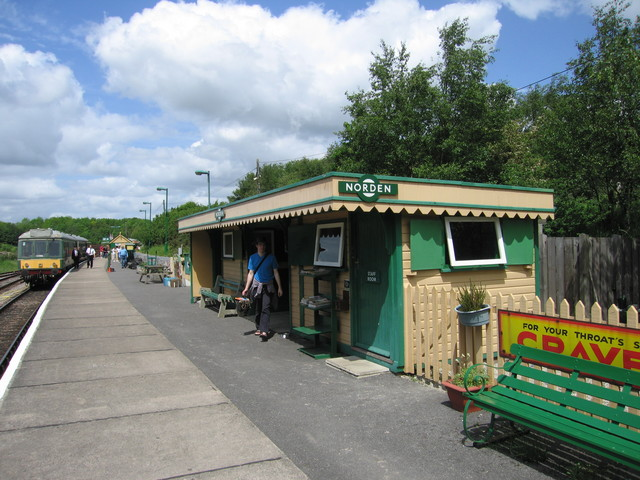
- The station platform looking towards Wareham. The Purbeck Mineral and Mining Museum is in the trees to the right.

General information
- Location: Corfe Castle, Dorset; England
- Coordinates: 50.6447°N 2.0624°W
- Grid reference: SY956828
- System: Station on heritage railway
- Manager: Swanage Railway
- Platforms: 1

Key dates
- 1995: Opened
Location

Norden railway station is a railway station located one mile to the north of the village of Corfe Castle, on the Isle of Purbeck in the English county of Dorset. It is situated on the Swanage Railway, a heritage railway that operates over the former London and South Western Railway line from Wareham to Swanage. Norden is the northern terminus of the railway's steam service from Swanage.

The site is the home of the Purbeck Mineral and Mining Museum, a museum about the history of ball clay mining in the Isle of Purbeck. The museum includes the relocated header building of one of the areas last underground mines, together with a reconstruction of an underground gallery. There is also a section of the narrow gauge railway that served the clay industry, and a collection of narrow gauge rolling stock.

A large car park, provided by Purbeck District Council, allows the station to function as a park & ride facility for the tourist centres of Corfe Castle and Swanage.

== History ==
The Swanage Railway follows the route of the former London and South Western Railway line from Wareham to Swanage, a line that opened in 1885 and was finally closed by British Rail in 1972. From the time of closure, a campaign to reopen the railway as a steam locomotive operated heritage railway developed, and the Swanage Railway began operating a steam service at the Swanage end of the line in 1982. As the line was progressively extended northwards towards Corfe Castle, concerns arose that terminating the line there would cause parking problems in the village. It was therefore decided to extend the line a further half-mile to Norden, and build a 'Park and Ride' site there.

Although there was not a passenger station at Norden prior to the opening of the current station in 1995, the station is built on the site of the former Norden Ball clay works. These works were served by a siding off the Wareham to Swanage railway, and also by two narrow gauge railways that connected the Ball clay pits to the works, and the works to small ports on the south side of Poole Harbour. The earliest of these was the Middlebere Plateway, a horse-drawn plateway that opened in 1806 and was Dorset's first railway. At the beginning of the 20th century this was superseded by Norden & Goathorn Railway, a conventional steam locomotive hauled railway. After the Second World War this railway was replaced with a local system that ran across the Skew Bridge at the eastern end of the station to the mines on the southern side of the A351. Because of this heritage, the Swanage Railway has developed the Purbeck Mineral and Mining Museum which is now open on the site at Norden.

Between 1995 and 2002, Norden remained the physical northern terminus of the line. In 2002 a temporary connection was made with the freight line that had continued to use the northern section of the line between Furzebrook and Worgret Junction, which connects the Swanage branch to NR's main line near Wareham and Furzebrook, and in 2007 this was made permanent. However all regular timetabled trains continued to terminate at Norden, with only occasional excursion trains running between the national rail network and the Swanage Railway. In July 2010, DCC and Purbeck District councils voted to allocate up to £3 million over three years, to part-fund re-signalling work needed at Worgret Junction to provide a more regular service. The first timetabled trains operated between Norden and Wareham stations on 13 June 2017, to mark the start of a two-year trial public service linking Wareham and Swanage.

== Services ==
Services run between Swanage and Norden every day from the beginning of April to late October, with services on a limited number of days for the rest of the year. The level of service varies from 4 to 16 trains a day in each direction, depending the season and the day of the week. In 2017, on 60 days in summer, four of these trains continue beyond Norden to join the national rail network and terminate in Wareham station, where they connect with trains on the London Waterloo to Weymouth service. The trains that continue to Wareham are always diesel hauled, whilst most other services are operated by steam locomotives.

Preceding station	Heritage railways	Following station
Terminus	Swanage Railway	Corfe Castle towards Swanage
Wareham Terminus	Swanage Railway Special events only	Corfe Castle towards Swanage
