= Purbeck District =

Former non-metropolitan district in England

Coordinates: 50°41′9.60″N 2°6′35.71″W

Purbeck Purbeck District
- Non-metropolitan district
- Purbeck shown within Dorset
- Sovereign state: United Kingdom
- Constituent country: England
- Region: South West England
- Non-metropolitan county: Dorset
- Status: Abolished
- Admin HQ: Wareham
- Incorporated: 1 April 1974 until 1 April 2019

Government
  - Type: Non-metropolitan district council
  - Body: Purbeck District Council
  - Leadership: Leader and Cabinet ( )

Area
  - Total: 156.1 sq mi (404.4 km^{2})

Population (2018)
  - Total: 46,800
  - Density: 300/sq mi (116/km^{2})
  - Ethnicity: 98.8% White
- Time zone: UTC0 (GMT)
  - Summer (DST): UTC+1 (BST)
- ONS code: 19UG
- GSS code: E07000051
- OS grid reference: SY9223587441
- Website: www.dorsetforyou.gov.uk

Purbeck was a local government district in Dorset, England. The district was named after the Isle of Purbeck, a peninsula that forms a large proportion of the district's area. However, it extended significantly further north and west than the traditional boundary of the Isle of Purbeck which is the River Frome. The district council was based in the town of Wareham, which is itself north of the Frome.

The district was formed under the Local Government Act 1972 on 1 April 1974, from the former municipal borough of Wareham, Swanage urban district and Wareham and Purbeck Rural District. The district and its council were abolished on 1 April 2019, together with the other four districts outside the greater Bournemouth area, to form a new Dorset unitary district.

Its name is recorded in 948 AD as Anglo-Saxon Purbicinga, meaning "of the people of Purbic", where Purbic may be a former Celtic name, or may contain a supposed Anglo-Saxon word *pur or "male lamb".

== Settlements ==
Settlements with a population over 2,500 are in bold.

- Affpuddle, Arne
- Bere Regis, Bloxworth
- Chaldon Herring, Church Knowle, Coombe Keynes, Corfe Castle
- East Lulworth, East Stoke
- Harman's Cross
- Kingston, Kimmeridge
- Langton Matravers, **Lytchett Matravers**, **Lytchett Minster**
- Morden, Moreton
- Ridge
- Steeple, Stoborough, Stoborough Green, Studland, **Swanage**
- Turners Puddle
- **Wareham**, West Lulworth, Winfrith Newburgh, **Wool**, Worgret, Worth Matravers
- **Upton** Lytchett Minster and Upton

== Places of interest ==
- Ballard Down, Blue Pool, Brownsea Island
- Chaldon Down, Chapman's Pool, Clouds Hill, Corfe Castle
- Dancing Ledge, Dunshay Manor, Durdle Door, Durlston Country Park
- Godlingstone Heath, Godlingstone Manor
- Hambury Tout
- Jurassic Coast (A World Heritage Site)
- Lulworth Castle, Lulworth Cove
- Kimmeridge
- Nine Barrow Down
- Old Harry Rocks
- Poole Harbour, Purbeck Heritage Coast
- Smedmore Hill, South West Coast Path, St Aldhelm's Head, Studland Bay, Swanage Railway, Swyre Head
- Tyneham
- Worbarrow Tout, Wareham Forest, Winspit, Wytch Farm

== See also ==
- Purbeck Marble
- Purbeck Ball Clay - Purbeck Mineral and Mining Museum
- List of churches in Purbeck
- Purbeck District Council elections
