= Brandy Bay, Dorset =

Bay in Dorset, England

Coordinates: 50.61400°N 2.15622°W

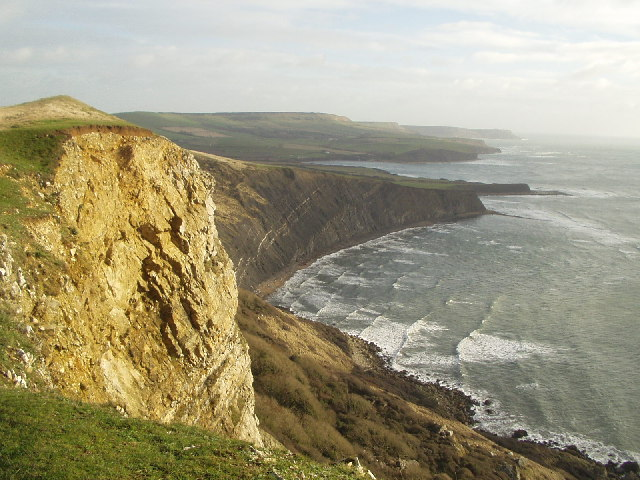
View from Gad Cliff over Brandy Bay on the south coast of the Isle of Purbeck, with Long Ebb and Broad Bench in the distance

Brandy Bay is a small secluded southwest-facing bay, with an oil shale and shingle beach immediately below Gad Cliff and Tyneham Cap, to the east of Worbarrow Bay and to the west of Hobarrow Bay on the south coast of the Isle of Purbeck, in Dorset, England.

Brandy Bay is located about 1 kilometre (0.62 mi) southeast of the ghost village Tyneham, 6 kilometres (3.7 mi) south of Wareham and about 16 kilometres (9.9 mi) west of Swanage. It is on the Jurassic Coast World Heritage Site and in the Dorset National Landscape area.

== Military use and access ==
Admission to the beach of Brandy Bay is prohibited. Access is solely possible by foot from the South West Coast Path via Hobarrow Bay or by boat. The area around Brandy Bay is owned by the Ministry of Defence (MoD). Lulworth Ranges are part of the Armoured Fighting Vehicles Gunnery School at Lulworth Camp. The Range, which is more than 2,830 hectares (7,000 acres) and stretches along the coastline between Lulworth Cove to just west of Kimmeridge. Because tanks and Armoured vehicles are used in this area, safety warnings about explosives and unexploded shells are posted around the area by the MoD, visitors are advised to keep to official footpaths and abide by local site notices.

== History ==
Brandy Bay once had a Roman settlement, but the name derives from the frequent smuggling activities that were taking place here during the 17th and 18th centuries.

== Geology ==
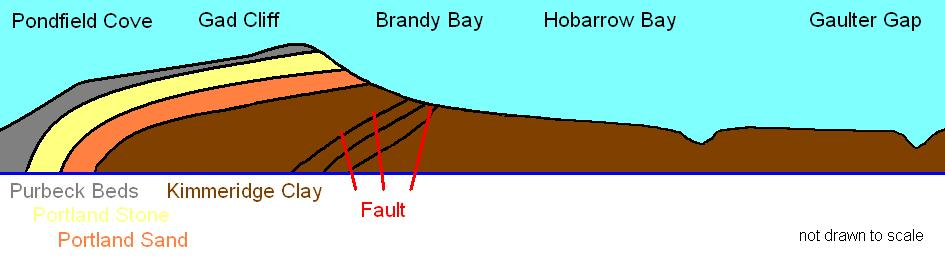
Geology of the coastline by Brandy Bay

The geology of the Isle of Purbeck is complex, and this is shown clearly along this stretch of coast. The extreme angular layers of rock seen in the cliffs visibly demonstrate the complex sedimentary folding that affected this area some 30 million years ago. The foldings were caused by the tectonic pressures as the African and European continents collided. During this period, the sediments were twisted horizontally, this is why the younger Cretaceous formations are found further back at the rear of Worbarrow Bay. Brandy Bay lies entirely within the Kimmeridge Clay Formation. Between Brandy Bay and Hobarrow Bay is a wide ledge of the dolomite (Flats Dolomite Bed) which is called Long Ebb.

== Long Ebb ==
At the southeast end of Brandy Bay, with Hobarrow Bay beyond, is Long Ebb, a small headland. This has an exposure at low tide of The Flats stone bed at its base, which is also visible at Broad Bench, further to the southeast at the other end of Hobarrow Bay.

== See also ==
- List of Dorset beaches
