= Tyneham Cap =

Hillock in Dorset, England

- View of Tyneham Cap

Highest point
- Elevation: 167 m (548 ft)
- Prominence: 64 m (210 ft)
- Parent peak: Swyre Head
- Coordinates: 50°37′02″N 2°09′15″W

Geography
- Location: Dorset, England
- Parent range: Purbeck Hills
- OS grid: SY891797
- Topo map: OS Landranger 195; Explorer 15E

Geology
- Mountain type: TuMP

Tyneham Cap is a prominent, grassy hillock, 167 metres (548 ft) high, on the South West Coast Path in Dorset, England. It rises above Brandy Bay and has extensive views along the Jurassic Coast across Kimmeridge Bay towards Swyre Head and St Aldhelm's Head to the east, and across Worbarrow Bay to Bindon Hill above Lulworth Cove to the west. It is classified as a "TuMP" due to its local prominence.

== Location ==
Tyneham Cap lies within the danger area of Lulworth Ranges. To the west, the terrain plunges over a steep rock face known as Gad Cliff into Brandy Bay on the English Channel. To the south on the coast are Brandy Bay, Long Ebb, Hobarrow Bay, and Broad Bench. To the north is the east-west valley containing the abandoned village of Tyneham and the village of Steeple. On the far side of the valley is the main ridge of the Purbeck Hills rising to Povington Hill (191 m, NNW) and Ridgeway Hill (199m, NE). Much of the surrounding terrain is downland and rough pasture with small woods and copses in the valleys and on the hillsides. The nearest villages are Steeple to the northwest, just over a mile away, and Kimmeridge, about a mile and a half to the east.
