= List of churches in Purbeck =

The following is a list of churches in Purbeck, Dorset.

== List ==
- St James's Church, Kingston, Purbeck
- Lady St Mary Church, Wareham
- St Martin's Church, Wareham
- St Mary's Church, Swanage
- St Nicholas's Church, Kimmeridge
- St Nicholas' Church, Moreton
