= Pondfield Cove =

Cove in Dorset, England

- Pondfield Cove beach with Worbarrow Tout behind

- Location of Pondfield Cove in Dorset Location of Pondfield Cove in England
- Location: East of Worbarrow Tout, Isle of Purbeck, England
- Coordinates: 50°36′57″N 2°11′2″W
- Type: Cove
- Primary outflows: English Channel

Pondfield Cove is a small, secluded, south-facing cove on the south coast of the Isle of Purbeck, in Dorset, England, about 12 kilometres (7.5 mi) south of Wareham and about 16 kilometres (10 mi) west of Swanage.

There are small pebbly beaches with cliffs at each end: Gad Cliff to the east and Worbarrow Tout to the west, with Worbarrow Bay beyond. At the back of the beach are "dragon's teeth" concrete defences dating from World War II.

The cove is only accessible when the Lulworth Ranges are open to the public. It can be reached either by a 1.4-kilometre (0.9 mi) walk down an easy track of around 1,500 yards alongside Tyneham Gwyle, from the car park alongside the ghost village of Tyneham, or alternatively via the South West Coast Path. There are hiking trails around the cove area.

== Geology ==
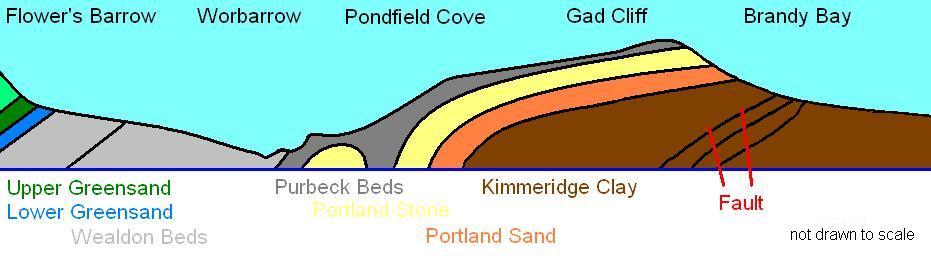
Geology of the coastline by Worbarrow Tout and Pondfield Cove

The geology of the Isle of Purbeck is complex, and this is clearly visible along this stretch of coast. The extreme angular layers of rock visibly demonstrate the complex sedimentary folding that affected this area some 30 million years ago. The foldings were caused by the tectonic pressures as the African and European continents collided.

During this period, the sediments were twisted horizontally; this is why the younger Cretaceous formations, between 85 and 145 million years old, are found to the rear of Worbarrow Bay. Pondfield Cove lies entirely within the Portland limestone, 150 million years old, and Purbeck Beds, 147 million years old. The sequence of Purbeck limestones and shales is visible within the low neck of land between Worbarrow Tout and the mainland. This cliff face separates the cove from Worbarrow Bay to the north.

== Gallery ==
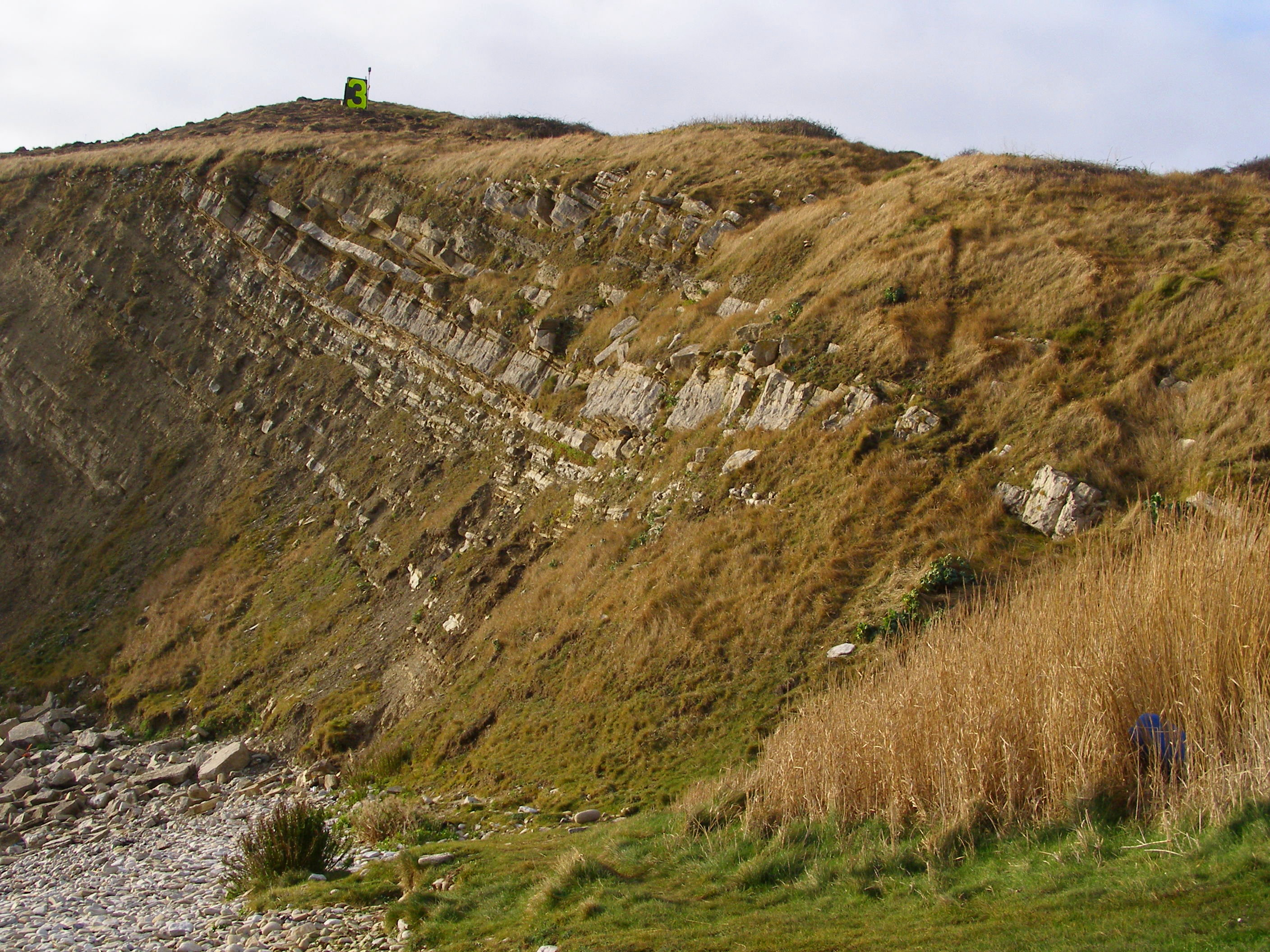
Cliffs on the west side of the cove

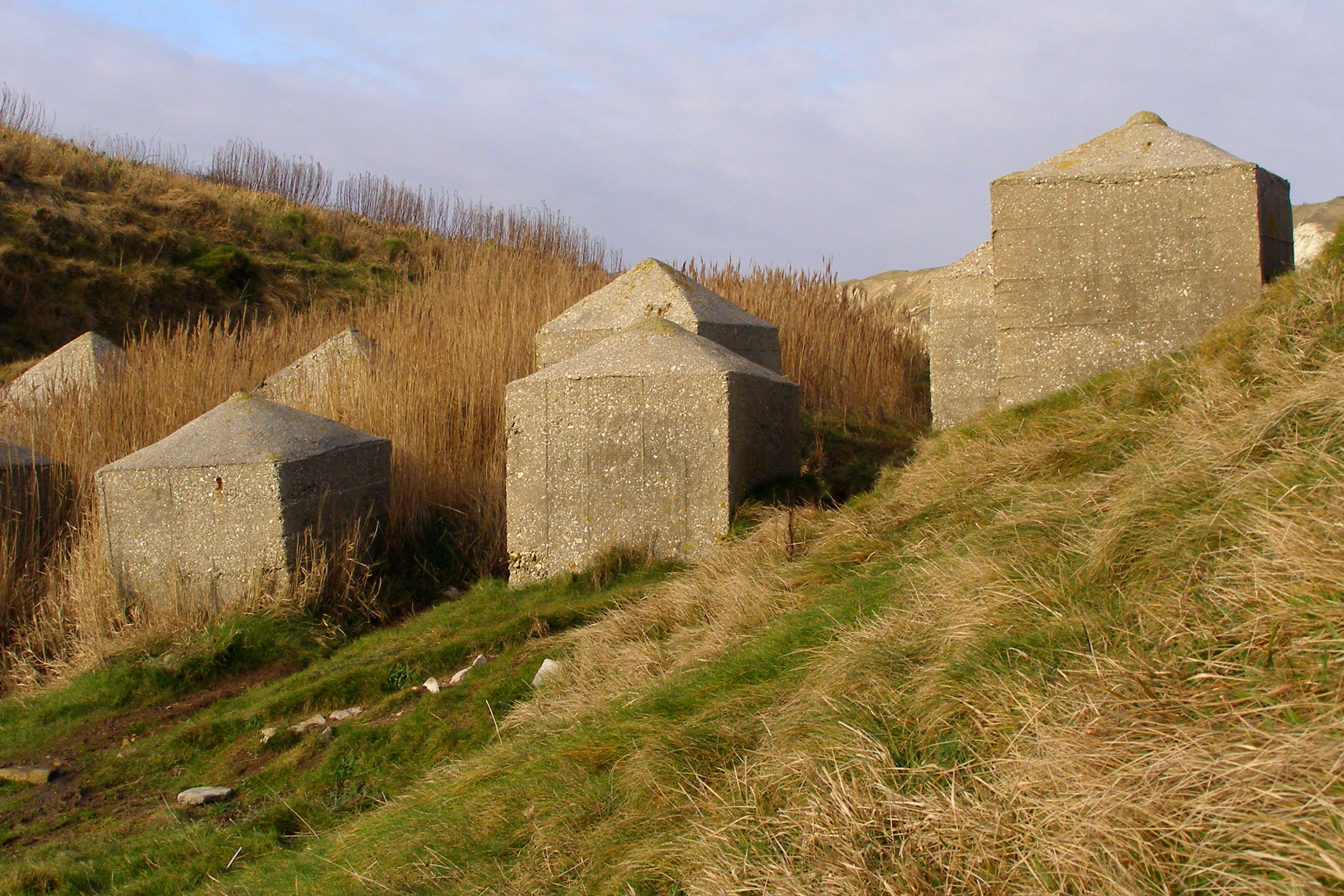
Concrete obstacles at the back of the cove

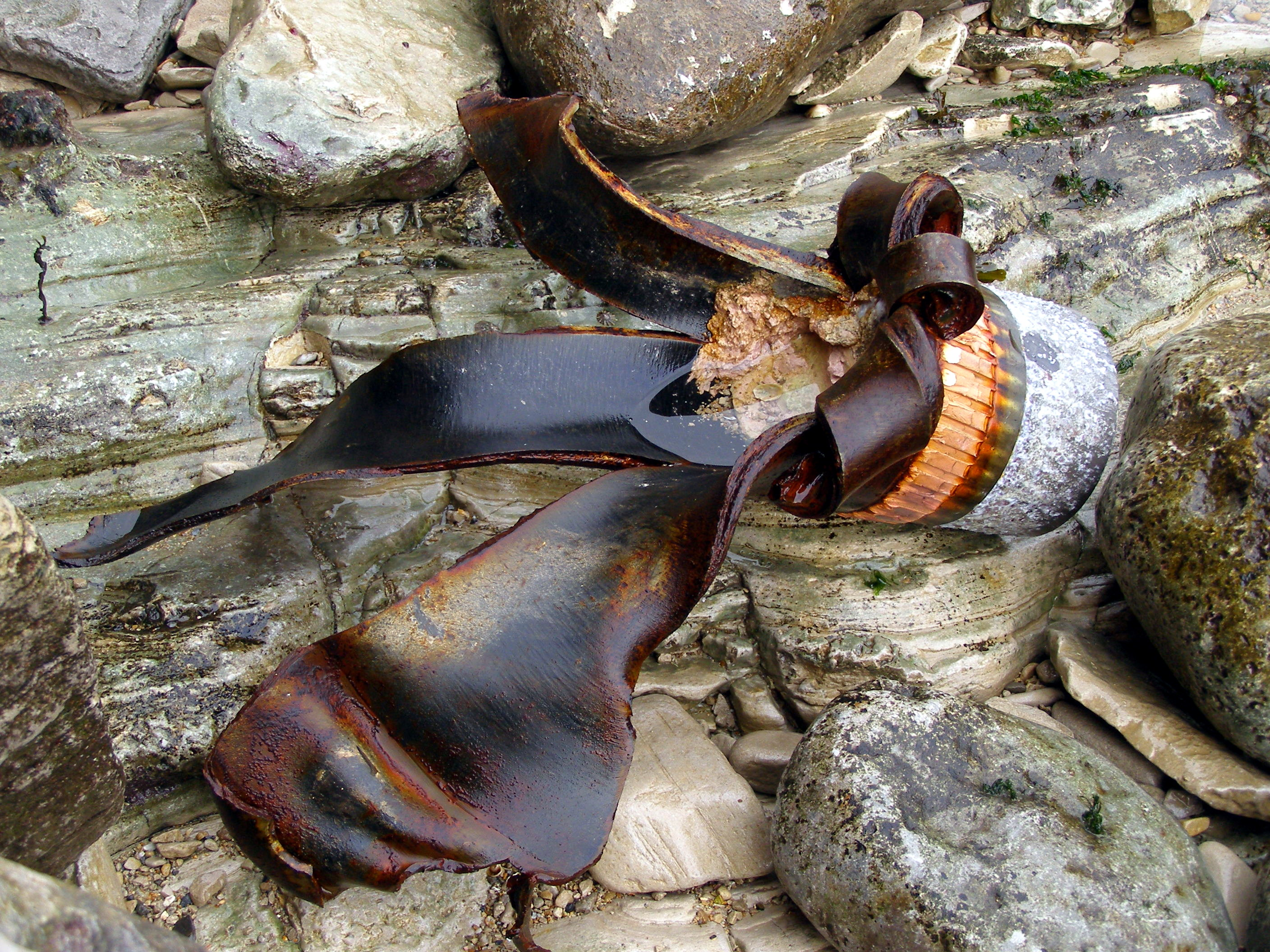
Shell on the beach

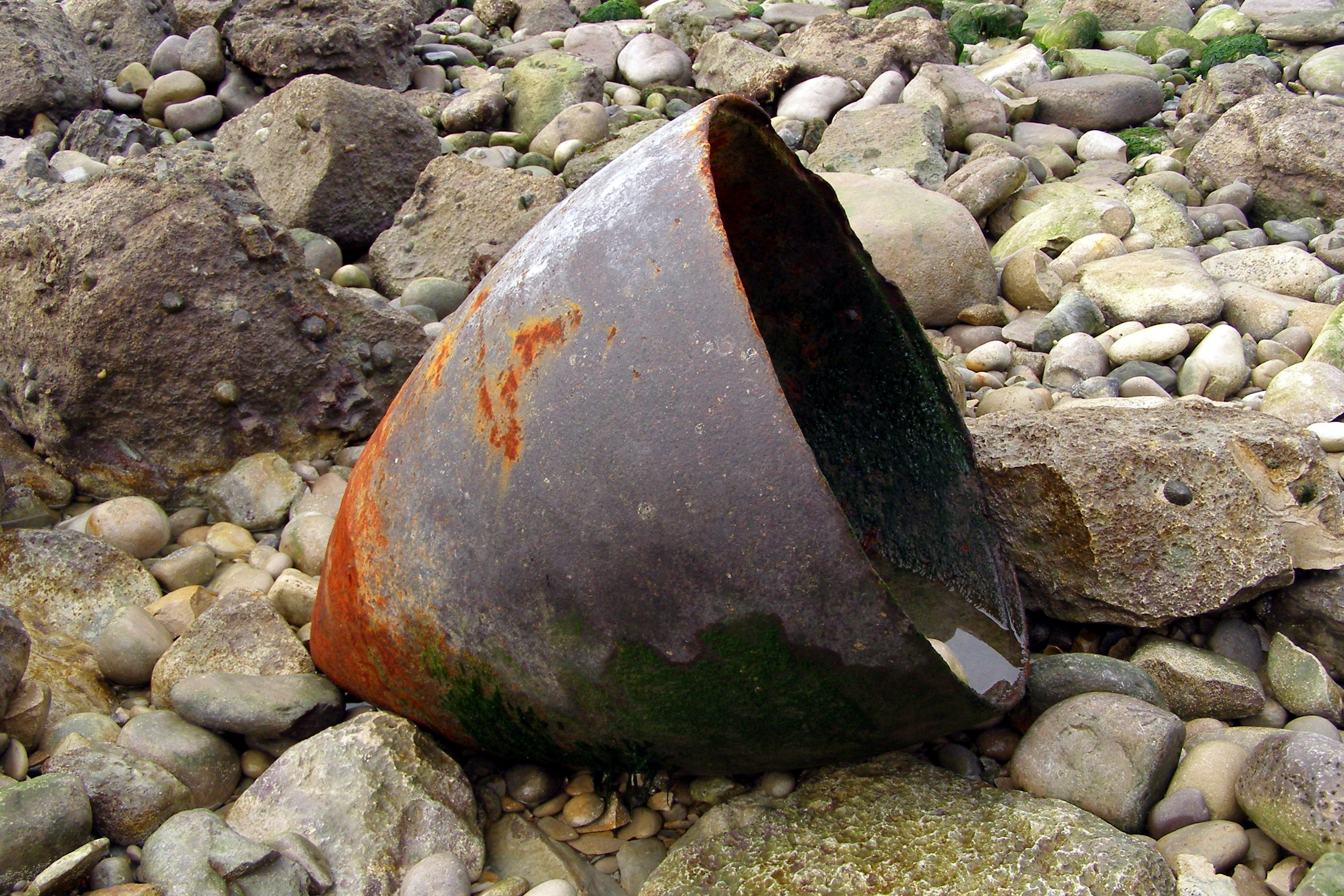
Nose-cone on the beach

== See also ==
- List of Dorset beaches
