= 2011 Purbeck District Council election =

Local election in Dorset

Results of the 2011 Purbeck District Council election

Elections to Purbeck District Council were held on 5 May 2011, alongside other local elections across the United Kingdom. Eight seats (one-third) of the council was up for election. The council remained in no overall control but moved from a Liberal Democrat minority to a Conservative minority council. Two months later a by-election victory made the Conservatives the biggest party on the council.

== Results summary ==
2011 Purbeck District Council election
Party	Seats before	Seats after	Change
Liberal Democrats	12	11	▼1
Conservative Party	10	11	▲1
Other	2	2	Steady

== See also ==
- Purbeck District Council elections
