= Hobarrow Bay =

Bay in Dorset, England

Coordinates: 50.61100°N 2.14860°W

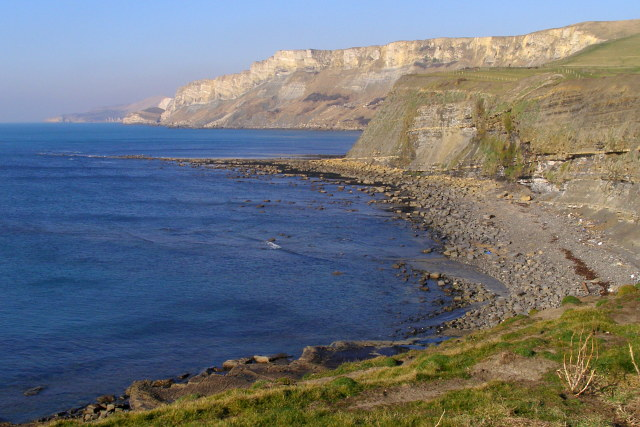
Hobarrow Bay and the Long Ebb headland at the far end. Behind Long Ebb are Brandy Bay and Gad Cliff.

Hobarrow Bay is a small secluded southwest-facing bay, with an oil shale and shingle beach to the southeast of Brandy Bay and to the southwest of Kimmeridge on the south coast of the Isle of Purbeck, in Dorset, England.

Hobarrow Bay is located just over 1 kilometre (0.62 mi) southeast of the ghost village of Tyneham, about 6 kilometres (3.7 mi) south of Wareham and about 15 kilometres (9.3 mi) west of Swanage. It is part of the Jurassic Coast World Heritage Site and the Dorset National Landscape area. At the northwest end is a small headland, Long Ebb. At the southeast end is a larger headland, Broad Bench, with The Flats, a solid rock ledge at sea level, below.

== Military use and public access ==
The area around the Bay is owned by the Ministry of Defence (MoD). Lulworth Ranges are part of the Armoured Fighting Vehicles Gunnery School, where tank and armoured vehicle training takes place. The ranges, which are more than 2,830 hectares (7,000 acres), stretch along the coastline between Lulworth Cove to just west of Kimmeridge.

Admission to the bay from the sea is prohibited. Access through the ranges on foot is permitted on days when training exercises are not taking place. The South West Coast Path runs along the cliffs above the bay; however, steep cliffs along with the Broad Bench headland make access to Hobarrow Bay itself nearly impossible. Safety warnings about explosives and unexploded shells are posted throughout the ranges, and visitors are instructed to keep to official footpaths and abide by local site notices.

== See also ==
- List of Dorset beaches
