= Broad Bench =

Headline in Dorset, England

Broad Bench Broadbench
- Headland
- View from the South West Coast Path
- Interactive map of Broad Bench
- Coordinates: 50.608515°N 2.146285°W
- Grid position: SY 897 787
- Location: Kimmeridge, Dorset, England
- Part of: Jurassic Coast
- Water bodies: Kimmeridge Bay (west) and Hobarrow Bay (east)
- Geology: Kimmeridgian
- Defining authority: Ministry of Defence
- Operator: Ministry of Defence

Broad Bench (aka Broadbench) is a headland on the Jurassic Coast in Dorset, England. It is on the South West Coast Path and within the Lulworth Ranges, so access is restricted.

To the west is Hobarrow Bay and to the east is Kimmeridge Bay. The area is interesting geologically. The Lower Kimmeridge Clay layer is exposed from about the middle of Kimmeridge Bay to Broad Bench, and then beyond west.

The sea in the area has been favoured by surfers. There have been protests by surfers due to Ministry of Defence restrictions to access. The waves can be up to 15 feet in height.

There is a CCTV camera on top of Broad Bench. Access is not allowed when red flags are flying since the area has been used for army exercises since World War II.

== The Flats ==
On the west side of the headland are The Flats, a solid rock ledge just above sea level. Broad Bench provides an excellent exposure of the yellow Dolomite Bed with expansion megapolygons. It has been described as "persistent tabular cementstone cut by polygonal network of low angle thrusts", at the top of the eudoxus zone. It is actually a ferroan dolomite. It includes a combination of ammonites from the Aulacostephanus eudoxus and autissiodorensis group.

== Charnel ==
Charnel at the west end of Kimmeridge Bay with Broad Bench beyond

Charnel is halfway along the Broad Bench headland on the east (Kimmeridge Bay) side. It is at the border of the Lulworth Ranges. It is now not accessible to the public.

It was previously the location of the Kimmeridge Lifeboat Station from 1868 to 1896. A Type 25 pillbox from World War II is located here, built during 1940–1. It is circular and constructed of concrete, with corrugated iron shuttering. A flagpole was erected here on the top of the cliff in 1843.

There is a geological fault in the rocks near Charnel.

The Flats at Broad Bench

View from the Tyneham Cap hill towards Broad Bench

Surfers at Broad Bench

== See also ==
- Kimmeridge Oil Field
