= Kimmeridge Oil Field =

Oil field in Isle of Purbeck, England

Coordinates: 50.6130°N 2.1370°W

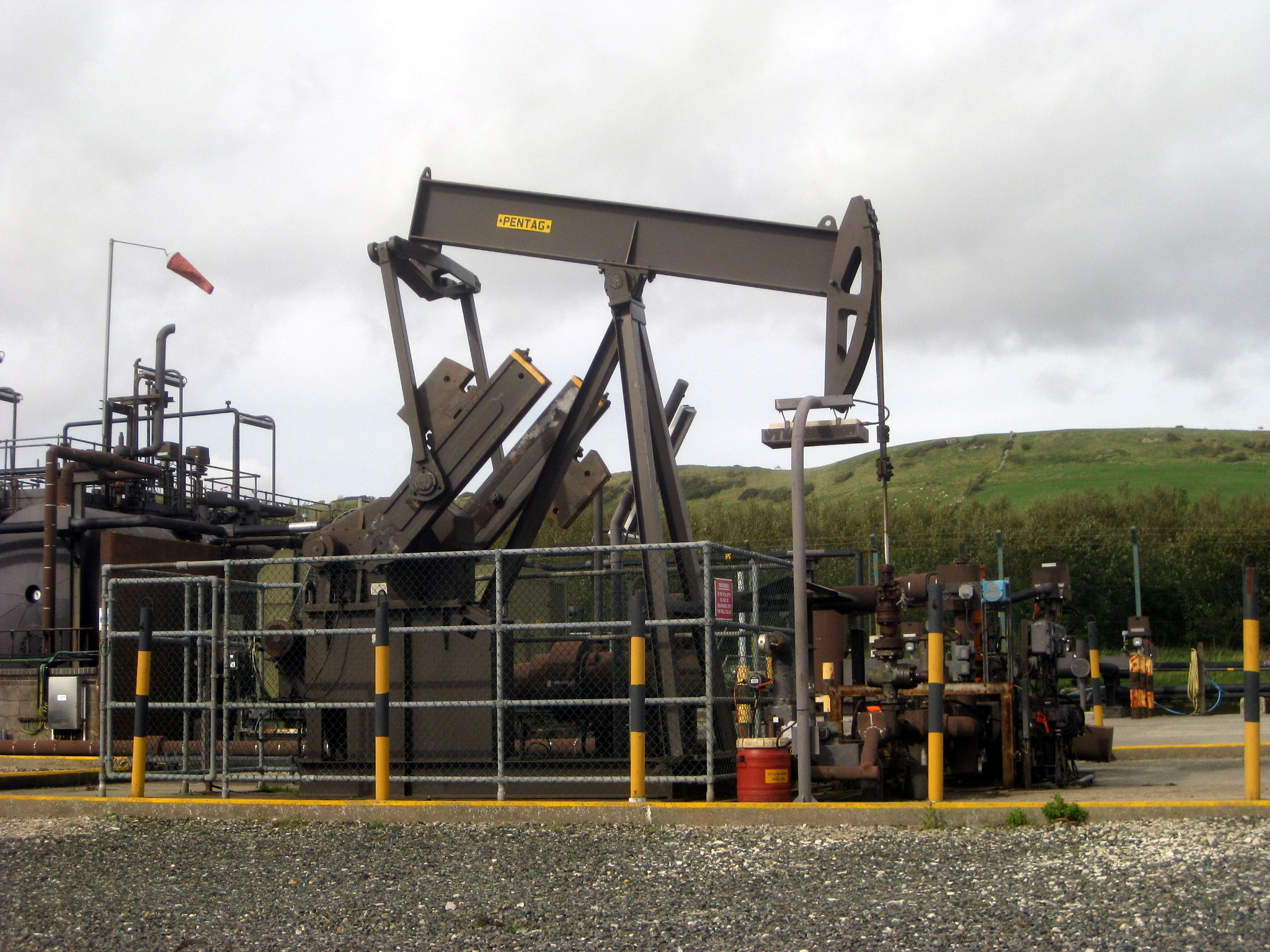
The "nodding donkey" at Kimmeridge Oil Field

The Kimmeridge Oil Field is an oil drilling site, northwest of Kimmeridge Bay, on the south coast of the Isle of Purbeck, in Dorset, England.

== Location ==
The small village Kimmeridge is about 6 kilometres (3.7 mi) south of Wareham and about 8 kilometres (5.0 mi) west of Swanage. The Kimmeridge oil field is part of the Wytch Farm oil field and processing facility operated by Perenco. Wytch Farm is on the southern shore of Poole Harbour and about 12 kilometres (7.5 mi) northeast of the oil well. Kimmeridge Bay and its cliffs are part of the Jurassic Coast, a World Heritage Site, because of the quality and variety of geological landforms along the coast.

== History ==
In Dorset the search for oil started back in 1935. Between 1958 and 1980 six wells were drilled in Kimmeridge Bay. The first drilling of the Kimmeridge oil field was the Broadbench 1 well to the north of Broadbench, which revealed neither oil nor gas. The second well Broadbench 2, later renamed Kimmeridge 1, was drilled in 1959 and both oil and gas were discovered. The Kimmeridge 2 well (drilled 1960) to the east of the car park showed only small amounts of oil, but it was retained as an observation well. The drillings Kimmeridge 3 (drilled 1959 to 1960) at Broad Bench and Kimmeridge 5 (drilled in 1980 near the Kimmeridge 1 well) exposed only weak oil contents, while the drilling Kimmeridge 4 in 1960, east of Brandy Bay by Long Ebb, revealed no exposures due to a mechanical breakdown.

The Kimmeridge 1 well site, is a small site, with a single beam pump or "nodding donkey" which has been pumping continually since 1961, making it the oldest working oil pump in the UK. The well once produced 350 barrels per day, but currently yields around 65 barrels per day (10.3 m^{3}/d) from the Jurassic strata that lie around 350 metres (1,150 ft) below the cliff. The well has been operating this long because it is tapped into a network of connected reserves, however the yield is decreasing. The oil is transported by tanker to Wytch Farm, from where it is piped to the storage tanks at Hamble-le-Rice on Southampton Water before being shipped to the main refinery. The nodding donkey has a high wire-mesh fence around it but it can be viewed clearly from all sides. The well provides views over the Kimmeridge Ledges and 8 kilometres (5.0 mi) of coast where bedrock extends at least half a kilometre out to sea under the waves.

== See also ==
- Petroleum reservoir
