= Arne, Dorset =

Coordinates: 50.69276°N 2.04021°W

Arne
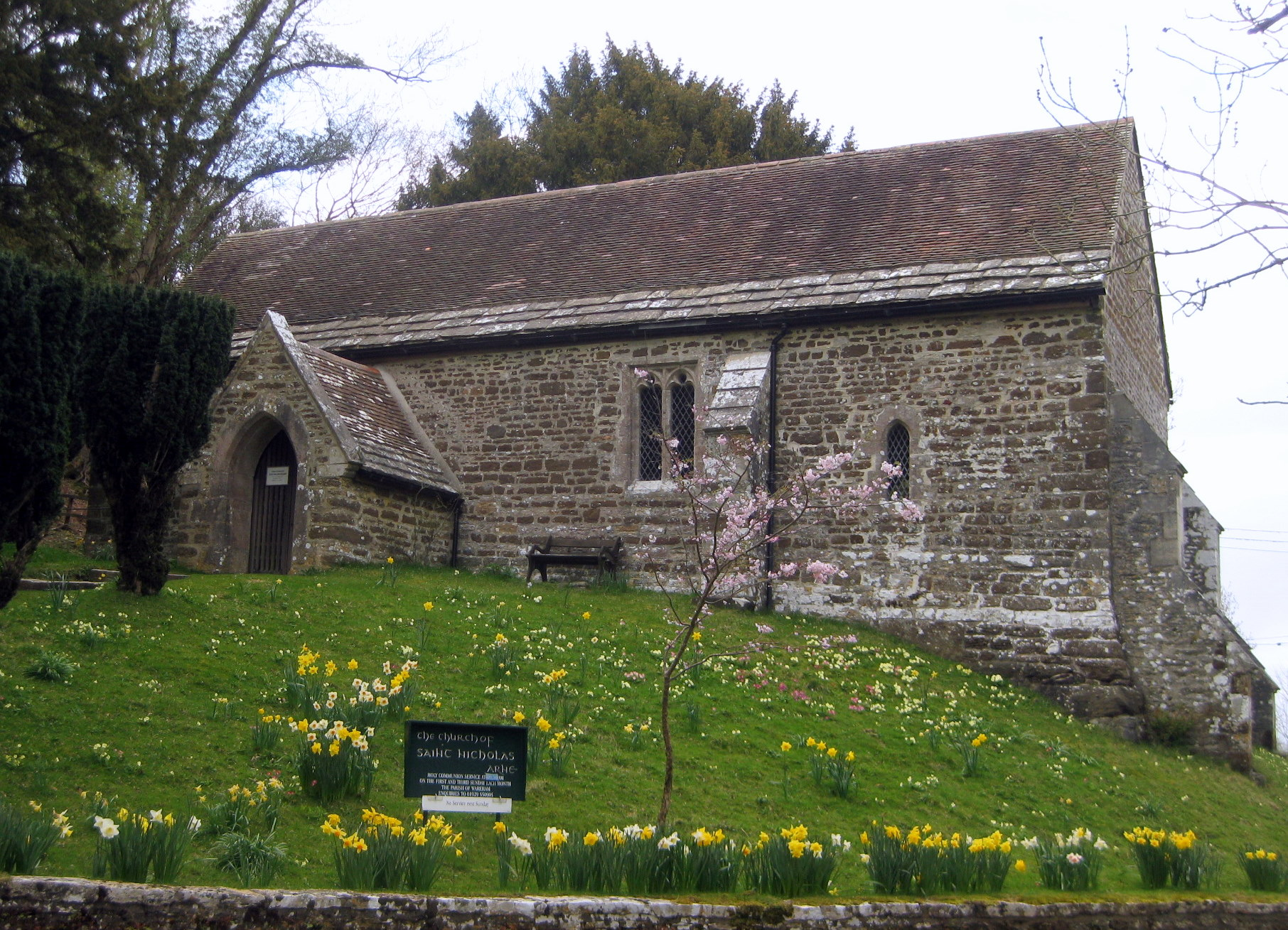
- The Church of St Nicholas of Myra, Arne

- Location within Dorset
- Population: 1,361 (2021 census)
- OS grid reference: SY972881
  - London: 102 miles (164 km) NE
- Civil parish: Arne
- Unitary authority: Dorset
- Ceremonial county: Dorset
- Region: South West
- Country: England
- Sovereign state: United Kingdom
- Post town: Wareham
- Postcode district: BH20
- Dialling code: 01929
- Police: Dorset
- Fire: Dorset and Wiltshire
- Ambulance: South Western
- UK Parliament: Mid Dorset and North Poole

Arne is a village and civil parish in Dorset, England, situated 4 miles (6.4 km) east of Wareham. The local travel links are located at Wareham railway station. Bournemouth Airport is 11 miles (18 km) away. The main road through the village is Arne Road connecting Arne to Wareham. The village is situated on the Arne Peninsula, which protrudes into Poole Harbour opposite the town of Poole.

== Toponymy ==
The name "Arne" is first recorded in 1268. It probably derives from the Old English: ærn meaning a house or building. Alternatively, it may derive from Old English: hær (dative plural hærum) meaning "at the heaps of stones" or "at the tumuli".

== History ==
Evidence of prehistoric human activity within the civil parish consists of 19 barrows and the remains of 4 linear dykes. The most significant of the barrows is the 'King's Barrow' at Stoborough, which probably dates from the Early Bronze Age. The dykes are on Worgret Heath; they are undated but analogy with similar structures elsewhere suggests Romano-British origins. In the Roman period there was also a salt industry of significant size on the shore of Poole Harbour.

Arne village is not recorded in the Domesday Book. The earliest record of the village is from 1285, though the parish church, which consists of a single-cell chancel and nave, dates from around 1200, and has not been substantially altered since, though it was restored in the 19th century and in 1952.

The village was owned by the wealthy Shaftesbury Abbey until its dissolution in 1539, but was never a large village, and by 1894 its population was only 123. A school had been opened in the village in 1832, but the shrinking population forced it to close in 1922.

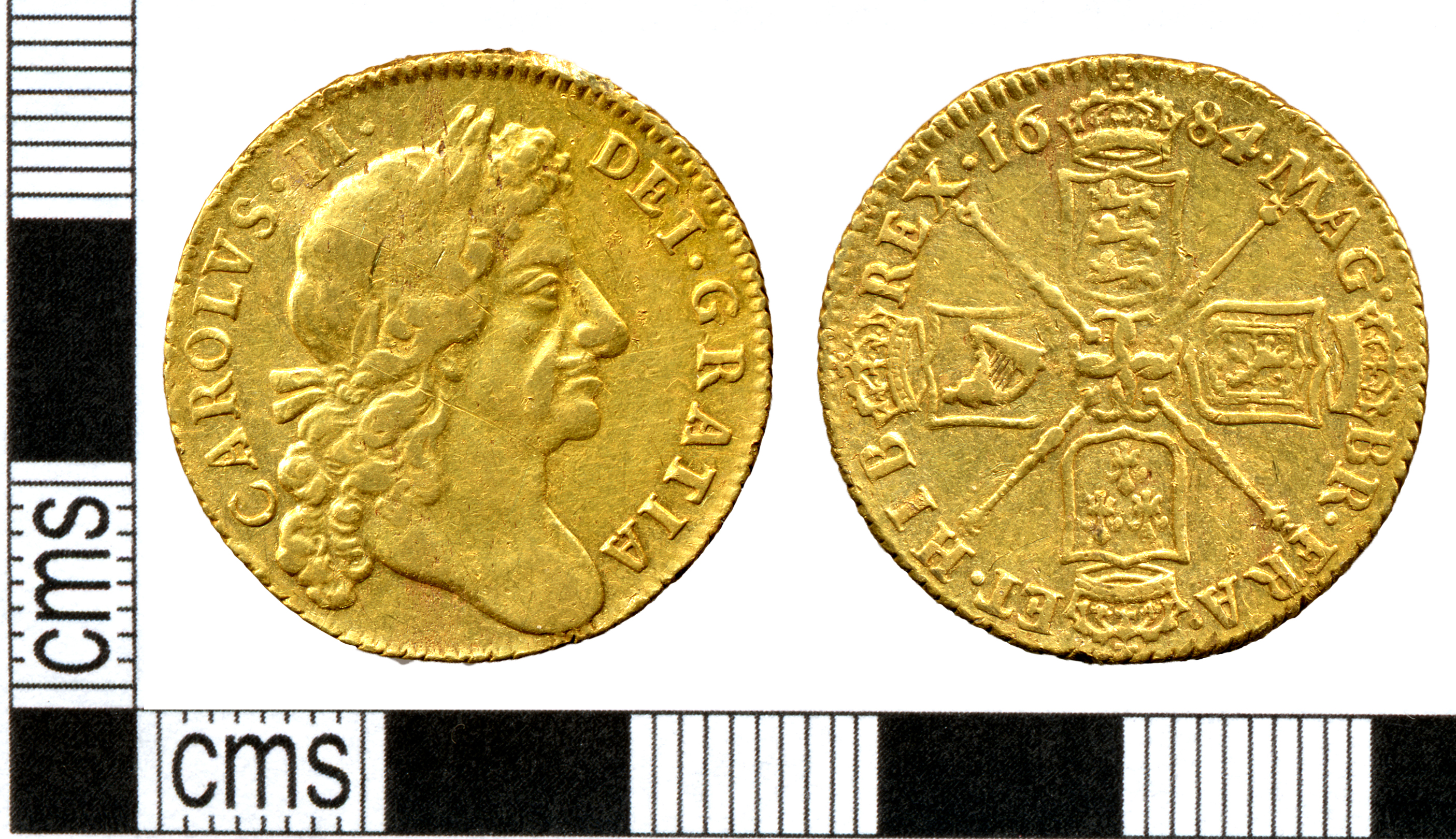
A gold guinea of Charles II, dated 1684, found in Arne

In medieval times the parish of Arne was much smaller; it covered 2,700 acres (1,100 ha) on the Arne peninsula and adjacent heathland. In the late 19th century it was expanded to include the two parts of Wareham Holy Trinity parish that separately covered Stoborough and Middlebere, and the part of Wareham Lady St Mary parish that covered Worgret, resulting in Arne parish more than doubling in size.

During World War I Holton Heath, three miles north west of Arne in the neighbouring parish of Wareham St Martin, was chosen as the site of the Royal Navy Cordite Factory, a key site for the manufacture of explosives used in military shells. Its isolated location would have mitigated civilian losses should an explosion have occurred, but following the start of World War II, the factory was a clear target for bombing raids by German aircraft. With the main flight path to Holton Heath passing right over Arne, the government created several "Starfish" decoy sites in the village. These consisted of a heavily guarded site containing a network of tar barrels and pipes containing kerosene that could be ignited when needed to give the appearance of a burning factory, thus confusing pilots into bombing empty countryside.

On the night of 3–4 June 1942, the decoy was brought into action and aircraft heavily bombed the decoy site, causing a fire that burned for six weeks. The decoy operation was a success, leaving the Cordite Factory untouched, but Arne was devastated, with over 200 bomb craters counted on the Arne Peninsula. The Germans, on the other hand, were convinced they had heavily damaged the factory and even Lord Haw-Haw reported that it had been badly hit. However, the village was left almost uninhabitable and the remaining occupants were given a month's notice that Arne was to be abandoned by 10 August.

After the war, the village remained largely derelict until the late 1950s, and in 1966 the Arne Peninsula was put under the protection of the RSPB.

== Geography ==
Besides the village and peninsula of Arne, the civil parish includes a significant area to the west of Arne and south and west of Wareham, including the villages of Ridge, Stoborough, Stoborough Green and Worgret, and has an area of 6,500 acres (26 km^{2}).

Arne is well known for the Arne RSPB reserve (Royal Society for the Protection of Birds), which is adjacent to the village. It also lies within the Dorset National Landscape area.

== Demography ==
At the 2021 census, the parish had a population of 1,361 people in 586 households.

Census population of Arne parish
Census	Population	Female	Male	Households	Source
1921	1,240				
1931	797				
1951	771				
1961	1,066				
1971	1,060				
1981	1,030				
1991	1,160				
2001	1,344	690	654	570	
2011	1,297	651	646	580	
2021	1,361	678	683	586	

== Governance ==
At the lower tier of local government, Arne is a civil parish which has a parish council of seven members.

At the upper tier, Arne is in the Dorset unitary authority. For elections to Dorset Council, it is part of the Wareham electoral ward. Historically, Arne was in Wareham and Purbeck Rural District from 1894 to 1974, and Purbeck District from 1974 to 2019.

For elections to the Parliament of the United Kingdom, it is in the Mid Dorset and North Poole constituency.

== Gallery ==
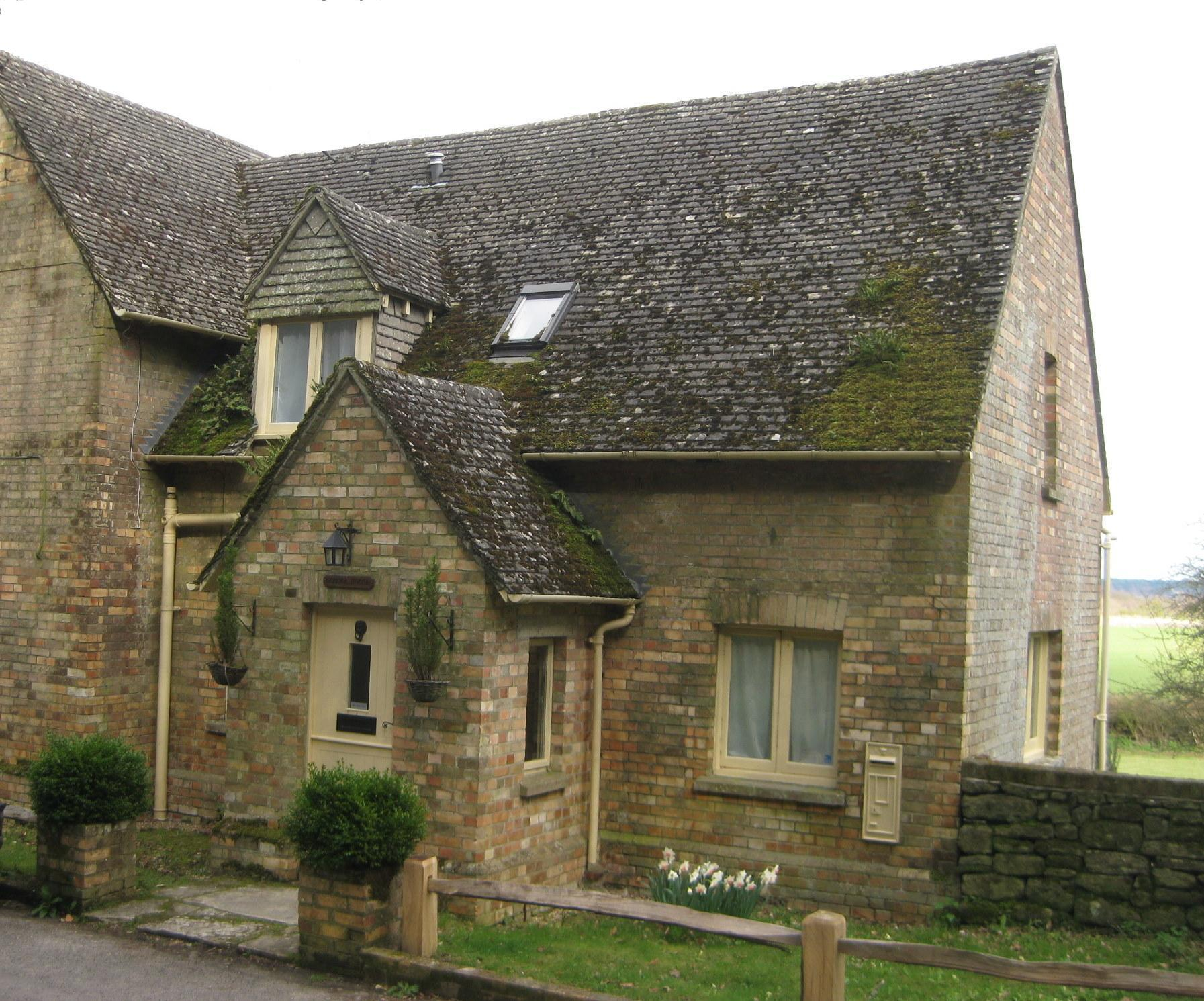
The old School House

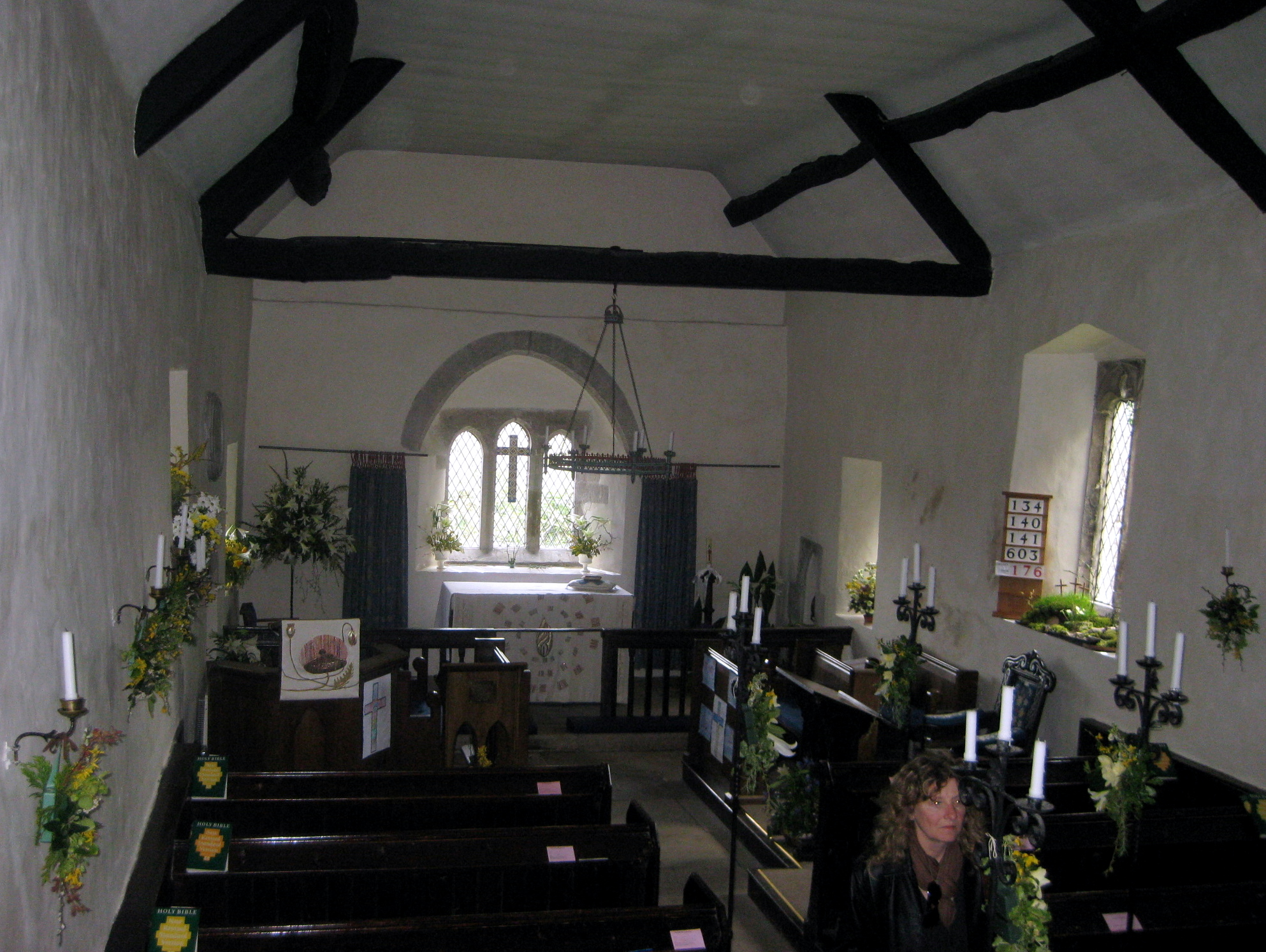
View inside the church

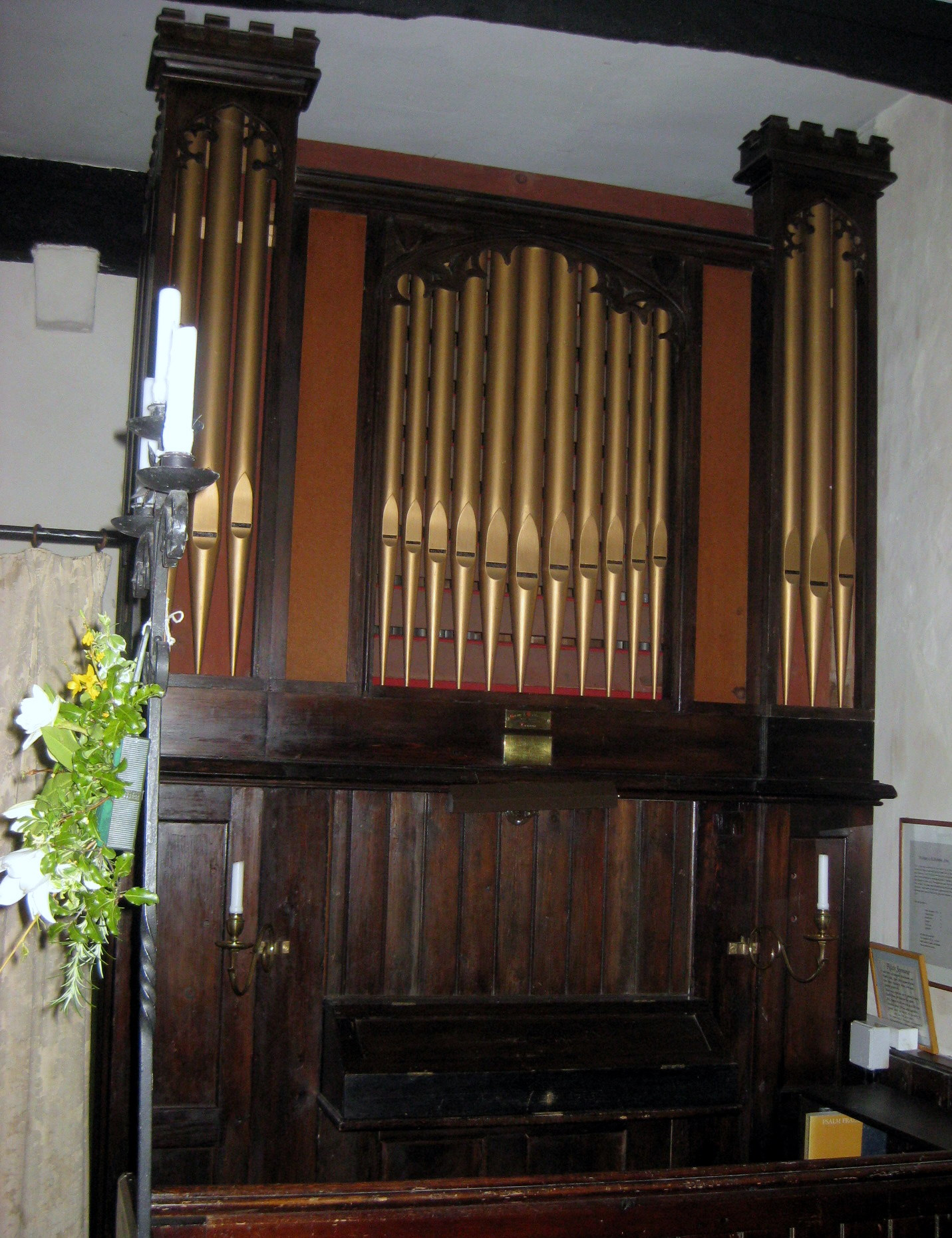
The Organ in the church
