= Smedmore =

Smedmore may refer to:

- Smedmore, Dorset
- Smedmore, New South Wales
