= Purbeck District Council elections =

Local government elections in Dorset, England

Purbeck District Council in Dorset, England existed from 1973 to 2019. One-third of the council was elected each year, followed by one year where there was an election to Dorset County Council instead. The council was abolished and subsumed into Dorset Council in 2019.

== Political control ==
From the first election to the council in 1973 until its abolition in 2019 political control of the council was held by the following parties:

Party in control	Years
Independent	1973–1986
No overall control	1986–1999
Conservative	1999–2008
No overall control	2008–2015
Conservative	2015–2019

=== Leadership ===
The leaders of the council from 2009 until the council's abolition in 2019 were:

Councillor	Party	From	To
Gary Suttle	Conservative	2008	2009
David Budd	Liberal Democrats	2009	2 Aug 2011
Gary Suttle	Conservative	2 Aug 2011	31 Mar 2019

== Council elections ==
- 1973 election
- 1976 election
- 1979 election (Note: New ward boundaries)
- 1980 election
- 1982 election
- 1983 election
- 1984 election
- 1986 election
- 1987 election
- 1988 election (Note: District boundary changes took place but the number of seats remained the same)
- 1990 election
- 1991 election
- 1992 election
- 1994 election
- 1995 election
- 1996 election
- 1998 election
- 1999 election (Note: New ward boundaries)
- 2000 election
- 2002 election
- 2003 election
- 2004 election
- 2006 election
- 2007 election
- 2008 election
- 2010 election
- 2011 election
- 2012 election
- 2014 election
- 2015 election (Note: New ward boundaries)

== Results maps ==
2002 results map

2003 results map

2004 results map

2006 results map

2007 results map

2008 results map

2010 results map

2011 results map

2012 results map

2014 results map

2015 results map

== By-election results ==
=== 1997–2001 ===
Swanage North By-Election 26 June 1997
Party	Candidate	Votes	%	±%
Independent		502	66.5	+39.0
Liberal Democrats		253	33.5	+13.5
Majority		249	33.0	
Turnout		755		
Independent hold		Swing		

Bere Regis By-Election 22 February 2001
Party	Candidate	Votes	%	±%
Independent		322	43.1	+4.9
Independent		267	35.7	+6.4
Liberal Democrats		158	21.2	+21.2
Majority		55	7.4	
Turnout		747	47.1	
Independent hold		Swing		

Castle By-Election 29 March 2001
Party	Candidate	Votes	%	±%
Conservative		341	49.4	−17.2
Liberal Democrats		281	40.7	+7.3
Labour		68	9.9	+9.9
Majority		60	8.7	
Turnout		690	43.7	
Conservative hold		Swing		

=== 2001–2005 ===
Lytchett Minster & Upton East By-Election 14 June 2001
Party	Candidate	Votes	%	±%
Liberal Democrats		1,080	59.1	+28.0
Conservative		746	40.9	−28.0
Majority		334	18.2	
Turnout		1,826	58.0	
Liberal Democrats gain from Conservative		Swing		

St Martin By-Election 27 June 2002
Party	Candidate	Votes	%	±%
Liberal Democrats		598	56.8	+13.0
Conservative		454	43.2	−2.4
Majority		144	13.6	
Turnout		1,052	50.9	
Liberal Democrats gain from Independent		Swing		

=== 2005–2009 ===
Castle By-Election 9 June 2005
Party	Candidate	Votes	%	±%
Conservative	Nigel Dragon	418	57.8	+20.0
Liberal Democrats		230	31.8	−27.7
Labour		74	10.2	+7.5
Majority		188	26.0	
Turnout		722	46.4	
Conservative gain from Liberal Democrats		Swing		

Lytchett Matravers By-Election 9 June 2005
Party	Candidate	Votes	%	±%
Liberal Democrats	Michael Peacock	688	63.4	+20.0
Conservative		397	36.5	−20.1
Majority		291	26.9	
Turnout		1,085	37.5	
Liberal Democrats gain from Independent		Swing		

Swanage South By-Election 15 June 2006
Party	Candidate	Votes	%	±%
Conservative	Michael Pratt	642	45.4	+9.8
Liberal Democrats	Anita Chennell	409	28.9	+6.6
Labour	Cherry Bartlett	363	25.7	−4.3
Majority		233	16.5	
Turnout		1,414	30.0	
Conservative hold		Swing		

=== 2009-2013 ===
Lytchett Matravers By-Election 7 July 2011
Party	Candidate	Votes	%	±%
Conservative	Peter Webb	669	52.8	+5.4
Liberal Democrats	John Taylor	599	47.2	−5.4
Majority		70	5.6	
Turnout		1,268	30.0	
Conservative gain from Liberal Democrats		Swing		
