= King's Table =

Stone table of the English monarchy

The King’s Table was a carved stone table that was a symbol of royal power in England. The table was used by monarchs from the 13th century onward for coronation feasts and state banquets.

== First use by Edward I of England ==
Edward I, the king who took the Stone of Scone from the Kingdom of Scotland, was the first English monarch recorded to have used it. The mid 13th-century style of carving means that the table could date back to Henry III. Henry VIII used the table for feasts after his marriages to Catherine of Aragon and Anne Boleyn. The table was originally constructed with Purbeck marble, sourced from Dorset, and repaired over a 300-year period with the first major change occurring in 1307.

== Destruction by Oliver Cromwell ==
The King's Table was broken into pieces by Oliver Cromwell following the English Civil War and buried under the Palace of Westminster. A new table was created during the English Restoration. The broken pieces of the original were placed in the foundations of a dais built in the 17th century in Westminster Hall, which was used by James II of England at his coronation banquet.

== 1960s rediscovery ==
The first piece of the table was rediscovered in the 1960s beneath the floor of Westminster Hall. Archaeologists rediscovered more pieces of the table in 2006.

== See also ==
- King’s Bench
- Jewel Tower
