= Worgret =

Hamlet in Dorset, England

Coordinates: 50.6828°N 2.1336°W

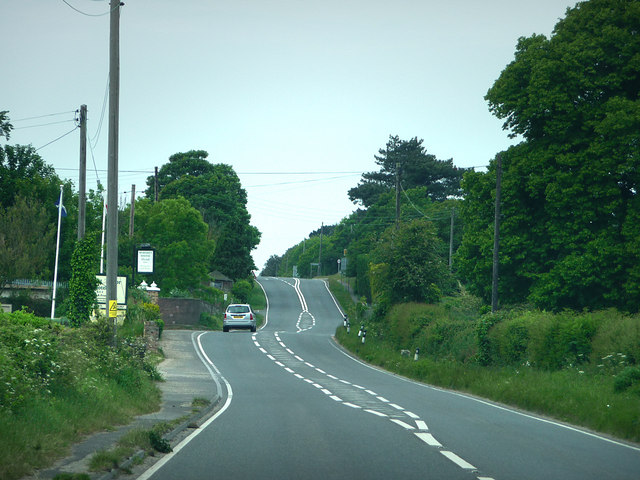
- A352 road at Worgret

- Location within Dorset
- OS grid reference: SY907870
- Civil parish: Arne
- Unitary authority: Dorset
- Ceremonial county: Dorset
- Region: South West
- Country: England
- Sovereign state: United Kingdom
- Post town: WAREHAM
- Postcode district: BH20
- Dialling code: 01929
- Police: Dorset
- Fire: Dorset and Wiltshire
- Ambulance: South Western
- UK Parliament: Mid Dorset and North Poole

Worgret /ˈwɔːrɡrɪt/ is a hamlet in the English county of Dorset. It is situated immediately to the west of the town of Wareham.

Worgret forms part of the civil parish of Arne, within the Dorset unitary authority.

== Name ==
Worgret shares its name with a 7th-century Abbot of Glastonbury reported by William of Malmesbury.
