= Smedmore Hill Settlement =

Coordinates: 50°36′59.″N 2°5′39″W

- Location within Dorset
- 50°36′59.″N 2°5′39″W
- Periods: Iron Age; Romano-British
- Location: near Corfe Castle, Dorset
- OS grid reference: SY 933 796

Scheduled monument
- Designated: 14 January 1970
- Reference no.: 1014835

The Smedmore Hill Settlement is an archaeological site about 2 miles (3.2 km) south-west of Corfe Castle, in Dorset, England. The site is a settlement and an associated field system, dating from the Iron Age and Romano-British period. It is a scheduled monument, described in the list entry as "a rare and well preserved example of its class".

== Description ==
The site is regarded as a settlement occupied by a group of subsistence farmers during the Romano-British period. It is on the northern slope of Smedmore Hill, a limestone ridge; its total area is about 1.2 hectares (3.0 acres), reduced slightly by ploughing at the north-east edge.

It consists of a block of small enclosures of size 0.02 to 0.08 hectares (0.05 to 0.20 acres), separated by rubble-built banks of height up to 0.45 metres (1 ft 6 in), each one levelled using limestone rubble, so that the enclosures are terraced into the hillside. Around the edge of the settlement are traces of a bank, up to 0.9 metres (2 ft 11 in) high, on the south, south-west and south-east; four gaps in the bank are thought to be entrances. There are inward-turning banks, perhaps to direct livestock into the settlement, by the western entrance where there is a gap 35 metres (115 ft) wide.

There is an enclosure which is perhaps a paddock, about 150 metres (490 ft) east of the settlement; its size is about 92 by 74 metres (302 by 243 ft). To the north and north-east of this are lynchets with widths 18 to 30 metres (59 to 98 ft), probably used for cultivation.

There was investigation in 1956 on the east side of the settlement, during construction of a water pipe trench. Finds included pottery of the Iron Age and Romano-British period, including Samian ware.
