= Stoborough =

Village in Dorset, England

Coordinates: 50.6769°N 2.1094°W

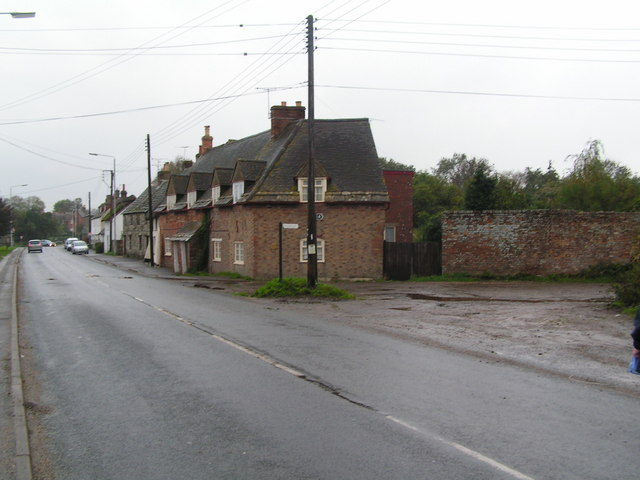
- Stoborough

- Location within Dorset
- OS grid reference: SY923861
- Civil parish: Arne
- Unitary authority: Dorset
- Ceremonial county: Dorset
- Region: South West
- Country: England
- Sovereign state: United Kingdom
- Post town: WAREHAM
- Postcode district: BH20
- Dialling code: 01929
- Police: Dorset
- Fire: Dorset and Wiltshire
- Ambulance: South Western
- UK Parliament: Mid Dorset and North Poole

Stoborough (/ˈstoʊbərə/) is a village in the English county of Dorset. It is situated one mile to the south of the town of Wareham, and separated from it by the River Frome. Stoborough and nearby Stoborough Green form part of the civil parish of Arne.

Stoborough is a liberty, in the parish of the Holy Trinity, next to the borough of Wareham, and is ¾ of a mile South of Wareham. It has been historically governed by a mayor and bailiff, chosen at Michaelmas; appointed by a jury at the Lord's manor court. Stoborough was reputed to be the settlement from which Wareham was founded.

In an 1832 administrative map of liberties and the List of Hundreds in Dorset, the boundaries of Stoborough is shown clearly as a large yellow liberty.

== History of Stoborough Manor ==
At the Domesday survey “ Beastewelle” was held in demesne by the Earl of Moreton, who was Robert, a Norman nobleman and the half-brother of King William the Conqueror, and it was taxed for three hides. In after times it formed part of a manor called the manor of By-est-wall and Stoborgh or Stowborough. The Stoborough Liberty and manor is the area south of Wareham and South of the river Frome.

In the Calendar of the Patent Rolls Preserved in the Public Record Office By Great Britain, Stoborough or Stowborough is granted by the Crown by King Richard III in 1484.

A Grant by King Richard, 1484, March 25 at Nottingham - "By p.s. Grant to the king's servant William Claxton, esquire, and the heirs male of his body, for his good service against the rebels, of the manors or lordships of Godmanston, Wareham and Stoweborough, co. Dorset, late of John Trenchard, traitor, of the yearly value of 401. 6s. 11d., and Meriot, Bukland St. Mary and Long Sutton in the said county (sic), late of John Bevyn, traitor, of the yearly value of 261. 8s. 21., to hold with knights' fees, wards, marriages, reliefs, escheats, advowsons, lands, waters, woods, underwoods, stews, fisheries, stanks, mills, meadows, warrens, parks, courts, views of frank-pledge, fines, amercements, heriots, rents, services, reversions, liberties and commodities by knight-service and a rent of 100s. yearly."

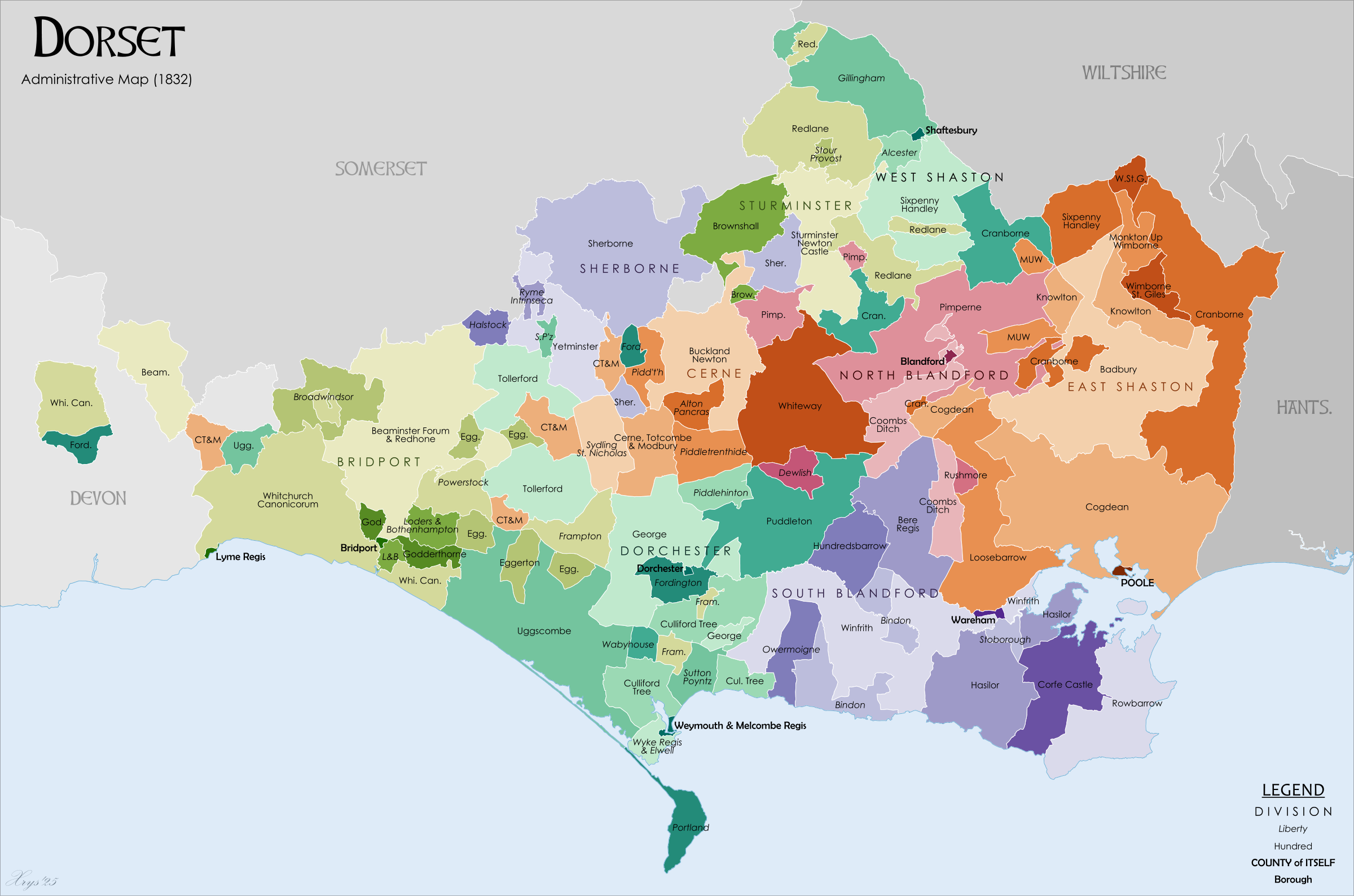
Stoborough Manor and Liberty Map
