= Kimmeridge =

Village in Dorset, England

Coordinates: 50.6178°N 2.1198°W

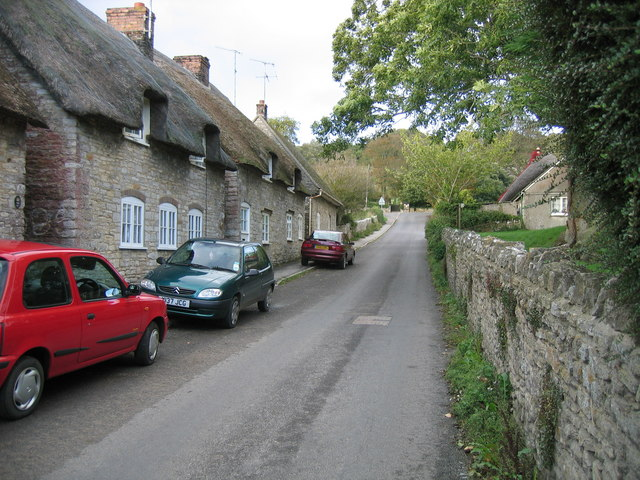
- Kimmeridge main street

- Location within Dorset
- Population: 90 (2013 estimate)
- OS grid reference: SY916798
- Civil parish: Kimmeridge
- Unitary authority: Dorset
- Ceremonial county: Dorset
- Region: South West
- Country: England
- Sovereign state: United Kingdom
- Post town: WAREHAM
- Postcode district: BH20
- Dialling code: 01929
- Police: Dorset
- Fire: Dorset and Wiltshire
- Ambulance: South Western
- UK Parliament: South Dorset

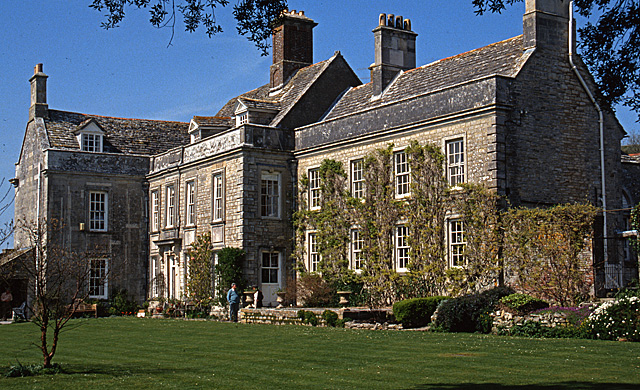
Smedmore House

Kimmeridge ( /ˈkɪmərɪdʒ/) is a small village and civil parish on the Isle of Purbeck, a peninsula on the English Channel coast in Dorset, England. It is situated about 4.5 miles (7.2 km) south of Wareham and 7 miles (11 km) west of Swanage. In 2013 the estimated population of the civil parish was 90.

Kimmeridge is a coastal parish and its coastline forms part of the Jurassic Coast, a World Heritage Site. The coast is also part of a Site of Special Scientific Interest, and the whole parish is in the Dorset National Landscape area.

Kimmeridge is the type locality for Kimmeridge Clay, the geological formation that covers most of the parish. Within the clay are bands of bituminous shale, which in the history of the village have been the focus of several attempts to create an industrial centre. An oil well has operated on the shore of Kimmeridge Bay since 1959. The village is the origin of the name of the Kimmeridgian stage of the Late Jurassic.

The roughly semi-circular Kimmeridge Bay is southwest of Kimmeridge village. It is backed by low cliffs of Kimmeridge clay, and beneath the cliffs is a large wave-cut platform and a rocky shore with rock pools and attendant ecology. Kimmeridge Bay is a surfer and diver area.

== History ==
In the Iron Age and during the Roman occupation, ornaments and other objects were made from the black bituminous shale—known as blackstone or 'Kimmeridge coal'—that occurs in layers within the Kimmeridge clay that covers most of Kimmeridge parish. Armlets were manufactured from the shale using a lathe, which produced waste in the form of hard black discs; these have been discovered at several sites, and were thought by 18th-century antiquaries to be coins and therefore called 'coal money'. The Romans also used the shale as fuel for boiling sea water to produce salt.

In the medieval period there were three settlements within the parish: Kimmeridge, Little Kimmeridge, and Smedmore. These each had their own rectangular strip of land stretching between the coast and Smedmore Hill. Only Kimmeridge survives as a settlement of any size.

In the mid 16th century Lord Mountjoy attempted to make alum here and acquired a patent to do so, though the enterprise was unsuccessful. In the first half of the 17th century Sir William Clavell made several unsuccessful efforts to turn Kimmeridge into an industrial venture. He tried boiling seawater to make salt, using the shale as fuel as the Romans had done. He then followed in Mountjoy's footsteps and founded an alum works, though he failed to secure a patent and ran foul of alum merchants in London who had sole rights (granted by Charles I) to produce alum in England; the merchants took Clavell's property and demanded £1,000 per year, then destroyed the works and stole Clavell's cattle. Clavell took legal action but was unsuccessful. He then tried to turn Kimmeridge into a port, and finally tried to manufacture glass with assistance from Sir Robert Mansell and Abraham Bigo, but both these enterprises failed; the pier which Clavell built for the port became ruinous and was destroyed by a storm in 1745.

Clavell had Smedmore House built less than a mile south-east of Kimmeridge village; referring to it as his "little newe House", he moved into it on its completion in 1632. Previously Clavell lived at Barnston Manor, near the neighbouring village of Church Knowle.

In the mid 19th century the shale was used a source of oil, and in 1847 an Act of Parliament enabled causeways, inclined planes and tramways to be built so the shale could be transported to Weymouth for processing into various petroleum-based products, including varnish, pitch, naptha, and dyes. Gas was also extracted from the shale, though like the oil it burned with a strong sulphurous smell, which limited its suitability as a domestic fuel and prevented fulfilment of a contract to supply gas to Paris for lighting.

The Royal National Lifeboat Institution stationed a lifeboat at Kimmeridge in 1868 but it was removed in 1896.

In 1959 an oil well was installed above the cliffs west of Gaulter Gap, overlooking Kimmeridge Bay. Comprising a nodding donkey pump that lifts crude oil from several hundred feet below the surface, in its early years it pumped more than 100,000 gallons per week, producing a total of 200,000 tonnes between 1961 and 1974.

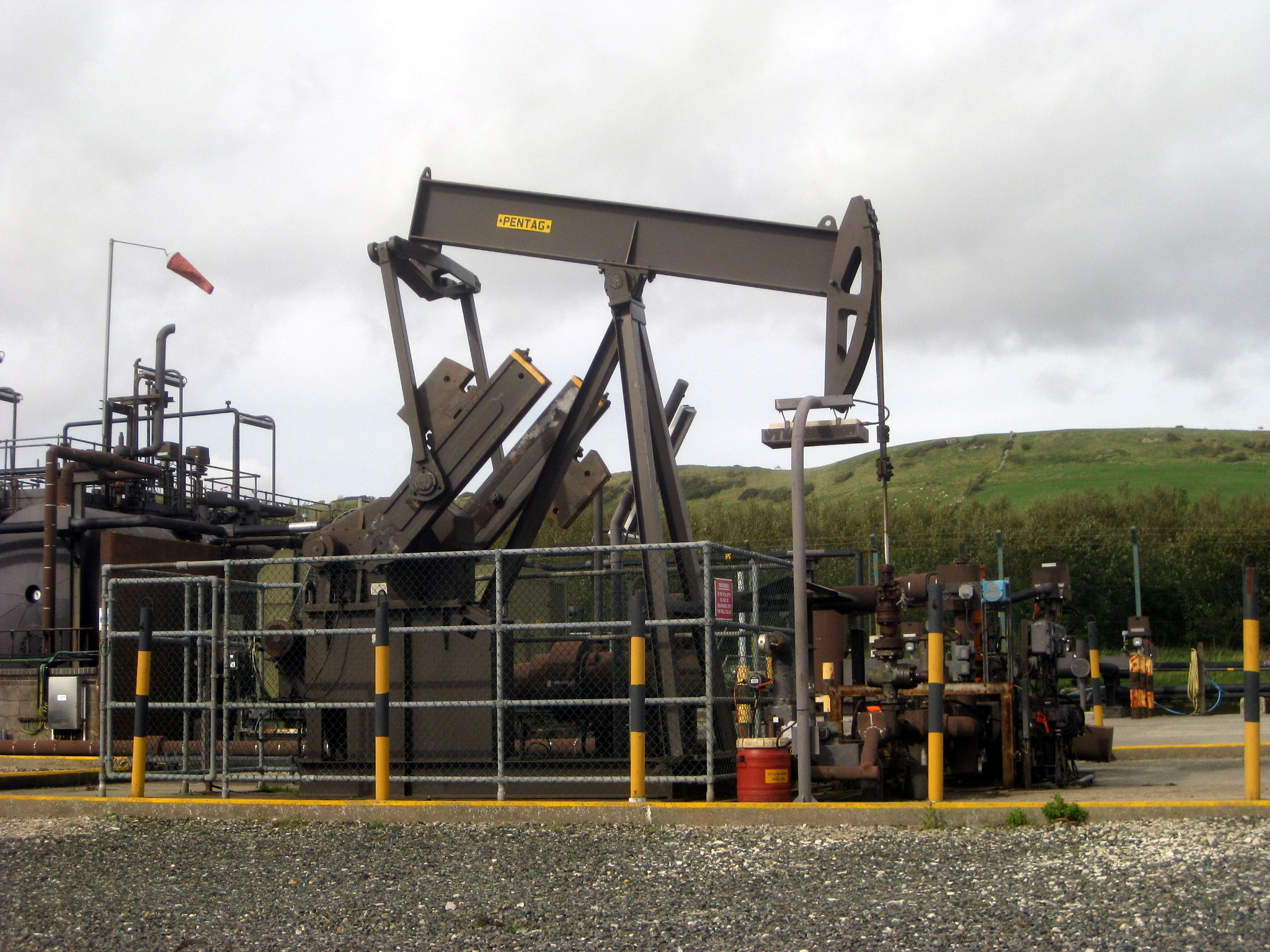
The "nodding donkey" oil pump beside the cliff west of the village

== Governance ==
For elections to the UK parliament, Kimmeridge is in the South Dorset parliamentary constituency.

In local government, Kimmeridge is in the Dorset unitary authority area at the highest tier. Kimmeridge is part of the South East Purbeck ward which elects 1 member to Dorset Council. At the lower tier, Kimmeridge is a civil parish which has a Parish Meeting.

Under former systems of local government, Kimmeridge was in Hasler Hundred until the 19th century, the Wareham and Purbeck Rural District from 1894 to 1974, and Purbeck District from 1974 to 2019.

== Geography ==
Kimmeridge village is sited beside a small stream on a roughly southwest-facing slope between the English Channel coast less than 1 mile (1.6 km) to the southwest and a curving line of hills immediately to the north and east. Measured directly it is about 7 miles (11 km) west of Swanage, 4.5 miles (7.2 km) south of Wareham and 15 miles (24 km) east of Weymouth. Kimmeridge civil parish covers land south and east of Kimmeridge village; it is bounded by the village stream and the copses of Higher and Lower Stonehips to the northwest, Smedmore Hill and the summit of Swyre Head to the northeast, field boundaries beyond Swalland Farm to the southeast, and the coastline between Rope Lake Head and Gaulter Gap to the southwest. The neighbouring parishes are Corfe Castle to the southeast, Church Knowle to the east, and Steeple to the north; this last parish includes the western half of Kimmeridge Bay and land very close to Kimmeridge village.

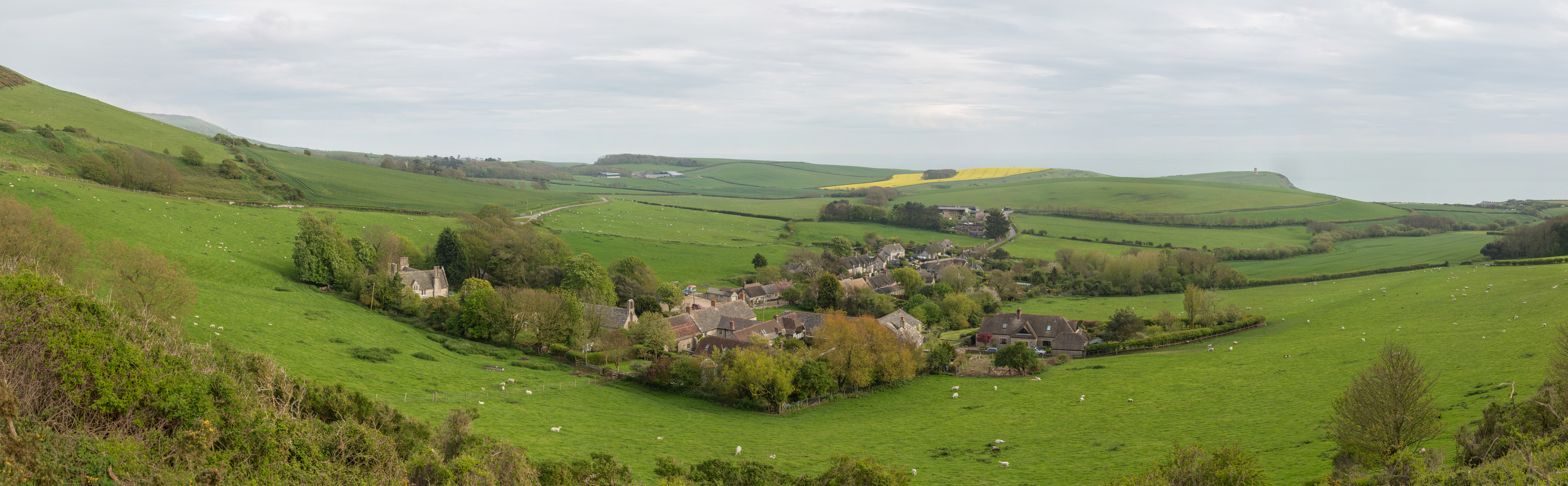
A panoramic view of the village from the north, looking towards the English Channel coast, which forms the horizon. The slopes of Smedmore Hill are to the left, and the Clavell Tower can just be seen on the step-shaped hill above and to the right of the village. The small parish church is on the left edge of the main cluster of buildings. Kimmeridge civil parish covers the village and the land beyond and to the left; the land in the foreground, between the camera and village, is part of neighbouring Steeple parish.

Kimmeridge civil parish has several protected landscape designations covering it either in whole or part. Its coastline forms part of the Jurassic Coast, a World Heritage Site that was designated in 2001 due to the global significance of its geological features and earth science interest. The coast at Kimmeridge also forms part of the South Dorset Coast Site of Special Scientific Interest. All of Kimmeridge parish is within the Dorset National Landscape (formerly "Area of Outstanding Natural Beauty"), which is a national designation that signifies the highest level of protection in relation to landscape scenic beauty. All the buildings in Kimmeridge village are within the Kimmeridge Conservation Area, which was created by the local planning authority in 1975 because of the historic and architectural interest of the village. Over 2,000 hectares (4,900 acres) of the coast and underwater environment at Kimmeridge Bay are designated as the Purbeck Marine Wildlife Reserve, the UK's oldest Voluntary Marine Nature Reserve; although offering no legal wildlife protection, there is a visitor centre beside Kimmeridge Bay.

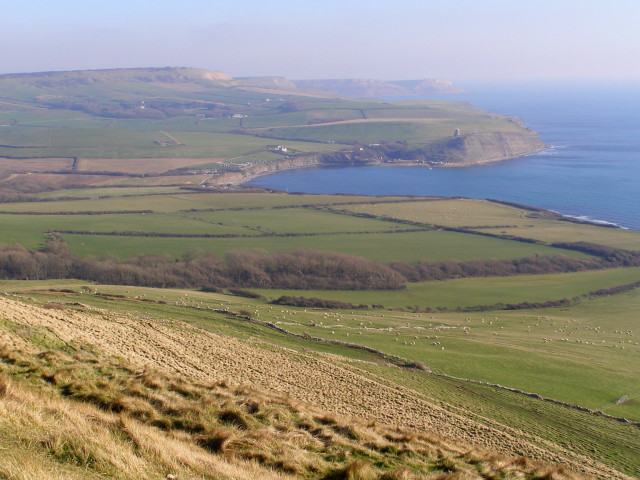
Kimmeridge Bay viewed from the WNW at Tyneham Cap. Kimmeridge parish occupies the further half of the bay and most of the land beyond it. Kimmeridge village is out of shot to the left.

=== Geology ===
The geology of Kimmeridge civil parish comprises bedrock formed in the Late Jurassic epoch, overlain in many places by superficial Quaternary head deposits. The bedrock is mostly Kimmeridge clay, except for the top of Smedmore Hill and along to Swyre Head, which is formed from Portland stone. Between this and the Kimmeridge clay, and outcropping just beneath the top of the hill, is a thin band of Portland sand. Landslip deposits from the Portland stone cover most of the steep southwest-facing slopes of the hills. Within the Kimmeridge clay are bands of bituminous shale and dolomite, which form flat ledges within Kimmeridge Bay that are exposed at low tide.

Kimmeridge gives its name to the Kimmeridgian, the division of the Jurassic period in which the beds were laid down, because of the quality of the cliffs and the fossils they yield. Kimmeridge is also the type locality for the Jurassic age Kimmeridge Clay formation, which is well represented in southern England, and provides one of the source rocks for hydrocarbons found in the Wessex and North Sea Basins.

The Kimmeridge Oil Field is northwest of Kimmeridge Bay. On the cliff west of the village is the Perenco "nodding donkey" oil pump which has been pumping continually since the late 1950s, making it the oldest working oil pump in the UK. The well currently yields around 65 barrels per day (10.3 m^{3}/d) from the Middle Jurassic strata that lie around 1,150 feet (350 m) below the cliff. The well has been operating for this long because it has tapped into a network of connected reserves; however the yield is decreasing year on year. The oil is transported by tanker to the Perenco site at Wytch Farm from whence it is piped to the main refinery on Southampton Water.

== Demography ==
In 2013 the estimated population of Kimmeridge civil parish was 90.

In the 2001 census Kimmeridge parish had 55 dwellings and a population of 110.

In the 2011 census results have been published for Kimmeridge parish combined with the neighbouring parishes of Steeple and Tyneham; this combined area contained 101 dwellings and had 87 households with a population of 206.

== Notable buildings ==
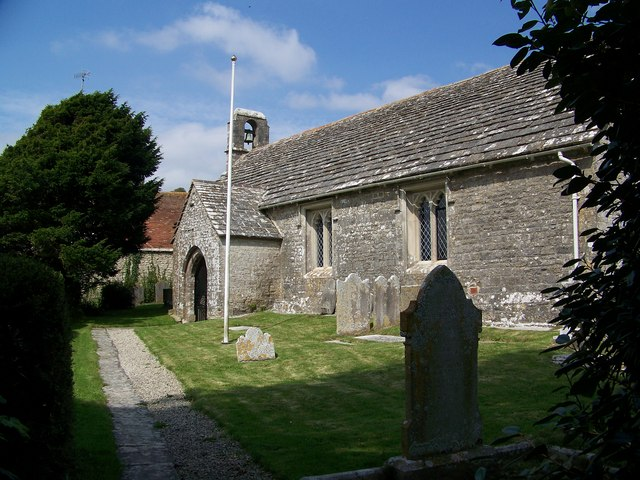
Kimmeridge parish church

Within Kimmeridge parish there are twenty-five structures that have been listed by Historic England for their historic or architectural interest. None has been listed as Grade I, but Smedmore House is Grade II*.

Along the shore immediately eastwards of Kimmeridge Bay (above Hen Cliff) is a folly known as Clavell Tower which inspired P.D. James's novel The Black Tower. It had been in danger of falling down the eroding cliff, so recently the tower was dismantled and then reassembled 115 feet (35 m) further back from the cliff edge. The tower is available as a holiday let.

The parish church was mostly rebuilt in 1872, though it has 12th-century origins; the south door and parts of the west wall of the nave are still original. The south porch is early 13th century and the bell-cote is 15th century.

== The Etches Collection ==
In 2014 £2.7 million was secured from the Heritage Lottery Fund for the purpose of creating a new museum in Kimmeridge, on the site of the old village hall. The project cost a total of £5 million and also houses conservation workshops and a new village hall and community space with a capacity for 120 people. The museum, called the Museum of Jurassic Marine Life, displays the Etches Collection of over 2,000 fossils collected over 30 years by village resident Steve Etches. The museum opened in October 2016.

== Surfing ==
Kimmeridge Bay is a surfing area which breaks infrequently due to its lack of exposure to Atlantic swells, but can produce walls of water when it is 'on'. Below the cliffs to the East is 'The Ledges', with slow left- and right-hand breaking waves; the right-handers can spiral for 70 yards (64 m) or more into the bay. To the West is 'Broad Bench', within the Ministry of Defence firing range and only accessible when the ranges are open to the public.

== See also ==
- Geology of Dorset
- Kimmeridge Bay
- Kimmeridge Ledges
- List of Dorset beaches
- Smedmore Hill Settlement
