= St Nicholas's Church, Kimmeridge =

Church in Dorset, England

Coordinates: 50.619110°N 2.1190256°W

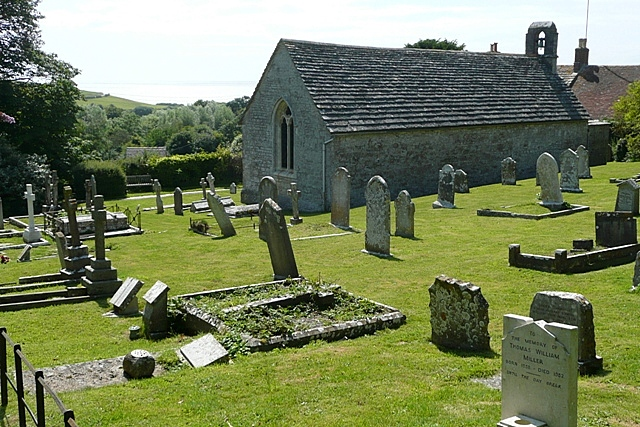
St Nicholas's Church, Kimmeridge

St Nicholas's Church is a parish church in Kimmeridge, Dorset. It is dedicated to St Nicholas of Myra. The church is in the Archdeaconry of Dorset, in the Diocese of Salisbury. The church is of 12th-century origin, much restored and rebuilt in the 19th century. It is Grade II listed.

== Dedication ==
Historically the church was of unknown dedication, but more recently it has been dedicated to St Nicholas of Myra.

== History ==
The church is of 12th-century origin, but was considerably restored and rebuilt in the 19th century. It is formed of a simple single-cell plan, with a 13th-century south porch, and a 19th-century vestry at the west end. Both the walls and the slate roof are made from stone.

== Features ==
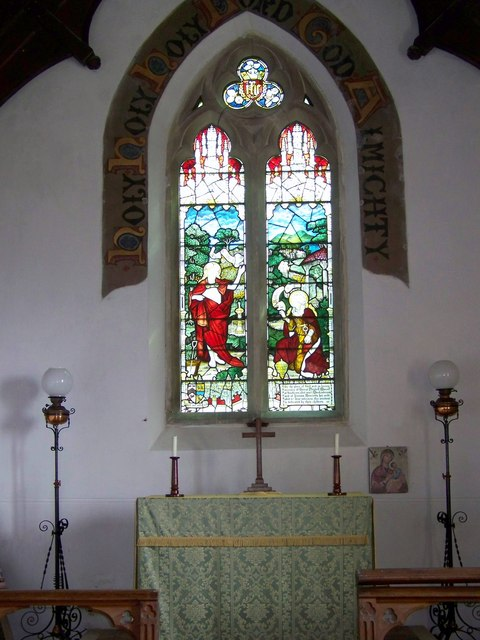
East Window by C.E. Kempe

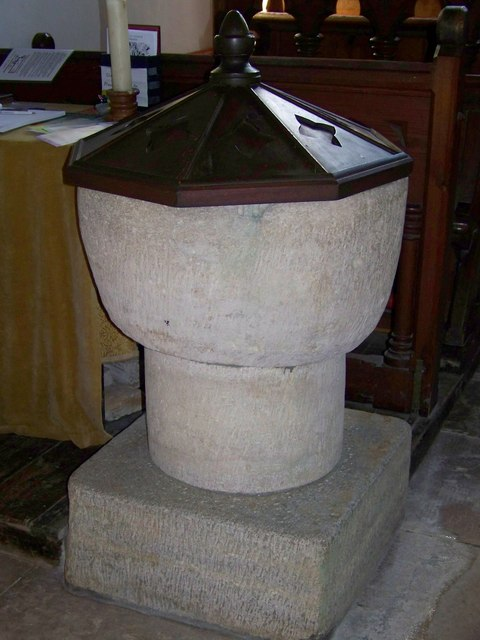
12th-century font

There is an open stone bell turret in the west gable, with a bell dating from 1499 cast at the Salisbury bell foundry.

There is a 12th-century font, which was found in a hedge in the 1920s. There is a reed organ at the west end of the church. The East window is a late window by C.E. Kempe, dating from 1904, and depicts Noli me Tangere and is a memorial to George and Jemima Mansell.

== Parish ==
Since 2018, the church has been part of the united benefice of St Aldhelm, comprising Church Knowle, Corfe Castle, Kimmeridge, Kingston, Langton Matravers, Steeple with Tyneham, and Worth Matravers.
