= Wytch Farm =

Oil field and processing site in Dorset, England

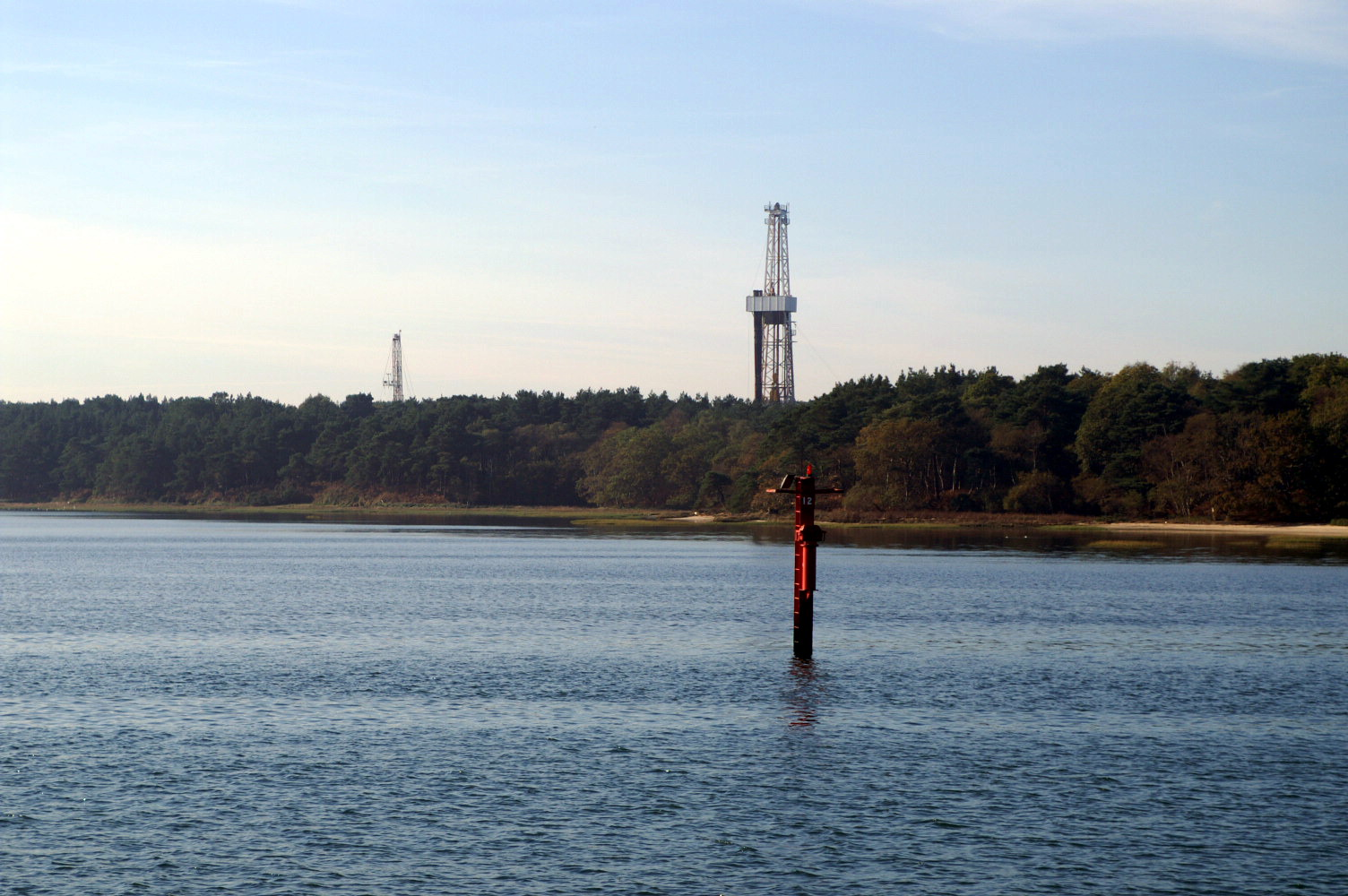
- Oil wells on the Goathorn Peninsula, Poole Harbour

- Location of the Wytch Farm oil field in Dorset
- Country: England
- Location: Dorset
- Coordinates: 50.66017°N 2.03673°W
- Operator: Perenco

Field history
- Discovery: 1973
- Start of production: 1979

Production
- Current production of oil: 13,500 barrels per day (~6.73×10^{5} t/a)
- Year of current production of oil: 2019
- Peak of production (oil): 110,000 barrels per day (~5.5×10^{6} t/a)
- Estimated oil in place: 65.40 million tonnes (~ 76.22×10^{6} m^{3} or 479.4 million bbl)
- Estimated gas in place: 1.42×10^{9} m^{3} (50×10^{9} cu ft)

Wytch Farm is an oil field and processing facility in Dorset, England. It is the largest onshore oil field in Western Europe. The facility, taken over by Perenco in 2011, was previously operated by BP. It is located in a coniferous forest on Wytch Heath on the southern shore of Poole Harbour, two miles (3.2 km) north of Corfe Castle. Oil and natural gas (methane) are both exported by pipeline; liquefied petroleum gas is exported by road tanker.

== History ==
=== Name ===
The oil field takes its name from the neighbouring Wytch Farm which had existed on the site for many centuries on the fringes of Wytch Heath.

=== Pre-1973 ===
The earliest industry in the Wytch Farm area dated to the early medieval period and featured multiple salt production workshops. The workshops, adjacent to the modern oilfield, were part of a medieval salt industry owned by Milton Abbey. The site was excavated by Bournemouth University under the directorship of Dr Derek Pitman.

The Isle of Purbeck's oil shale, or "Kimmeridge Coal" which has been won from the cliffs to the east of Kimmeridge since the early 17th century, is no longer used commercially. Similar deposits were found at Wytch Farm in the 1890s, but were commercially exploited until only circa 1900, and only at a low level. The Kimmeridge Oil and Carbon Company reported that in 1890 it had dug 5,000 feet (1,500 m) of tunnels at Kimmeridge on four levels into the local cliffs. There was a local jetty to export the oil shale, and smaller operations occurred at nearby Bencliff Grit east of Osmington Mills.

The Isle of Purbeck's oil industry began in 1936 with the first unsuccessful and then experimental wells drilled at Broad Bench near Kimmeridge by D'Arcy Exploration. The area had long been mined for oil shale and tar, but was only prospected for crude oil in the 1950s. It was not until 1959 that a borehole at Kimmeridge showed that oil was seeping out, and 1960 that BP's Kimmeridge Oil Field was discovered.

=== 1973 to date ===
The field was discovered by the British government owned British Gas Corporation in December 1973 and began producing oil in May 1979.

Only after further drilling in December 1977 at 5,000 ft, was the enormous oil field found. This oil discovery was due to one geologist who had chosen where to drill, Vic Coulter of British Gas. Afterwards, BP now had to persuade the reluctant Dorset County Council that they could be environmentally responsible enough; Dorset County Council were greatly suspicious, and needed much persuasion.

The next-largest onshore oil field in the UK is at Welton, Lincolnshire.

Wytch Farm was sold to BP which took over as operator in 1984. In May 2011, BP announced that it had agreed to sell its majority interest in Wytch Farm to Perenco, which became the new operator. Premier Oil has a 30.1% stake in the field. On 17 May 2011, BP announced the sale of its interests in the Wytch Farm, Wareham, Beacon and Kimmeridge fields to Perenco and the sale of the Dimlington gas terminal to Perenco in February 2011. In September 2012, Perenco UK applied to Dorset County Council (DCC) for permission to extend the life of 39 planning permissions at three of the oilfields. DCC's Planning Committee recommended approval of the applications on 6 September 2013, thereby extending to 2037 the operational life of the oilfields, beyond their original end-date of 2016.

=== 2023 oil spill ===
On 26 March 2023, the Poole Harbour Commissioners reported that around 200 barrels of "reservoir fluid" had leaked into Poole Harbour from one of the oil field's pipelines. The Environment Agency described it as a "major incident". Bournemouth Christchurch and Poole Council leader Philip Broadhead called the leak "unacceptable...some serious questions need to be answered".

== Geology ==
The field is located in a faulted block of Jurassic and older rocks beneath the Hampshire Basin, close to the steeply sloping monocline in the overlying chalk. It forms part of the Wessex Basin.

The Purbeck Monocline defines the field's southern limit. The field consists of three separate reservoirs known as Bridport, Sherwood and Frome. Bridport, the first discovery, is in the Jurassic Bridport Sands 900 metres (3,000 ft) below Poole Harbour, with an oil source in the Lower Lias. The much larger Sherwood (discovered 1978) is below this in the Triassic Sherwood Sandstone at 1,600 metres (5,200 ft) and extends under Poole Bay. The Frome reservoir is in a shelly limestone within the Frome Clay at 750 metres (2,460 ft). The field extends eastwards from Sandbanks and Studland for around 10 kilometres (6.2 mi) under the sea to the south of Bournemouth.

== Environment ==
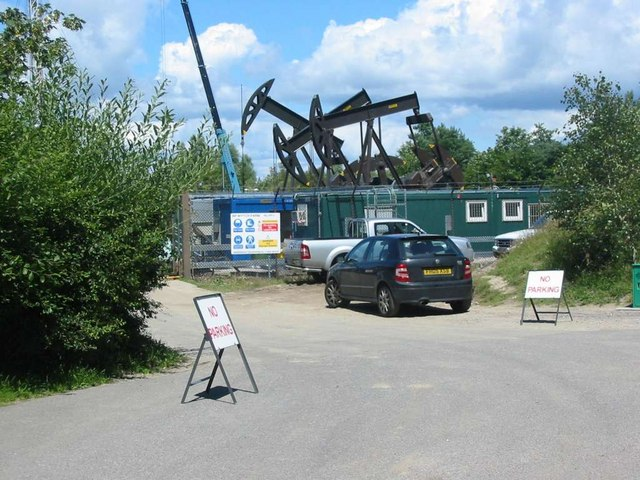
Wytch Farm oil wells

Most of the field is protected by various conservation laws, including the Jurassic Coast World Heritage Site, Purbeck Heritage Coast and a number of sites of special scientific interest, areas of outstanding natural beauty and nature reserves (including Studland and Brownsea Island), so the gathering centre and most of the well sites are small and well screened by trees. Directional drilling has also contributed to reducing the impact on the local environment, with extended reach drilling from the Goathorn Peninsula attaining distances in excess of 10 km.

== Production and reserves ==
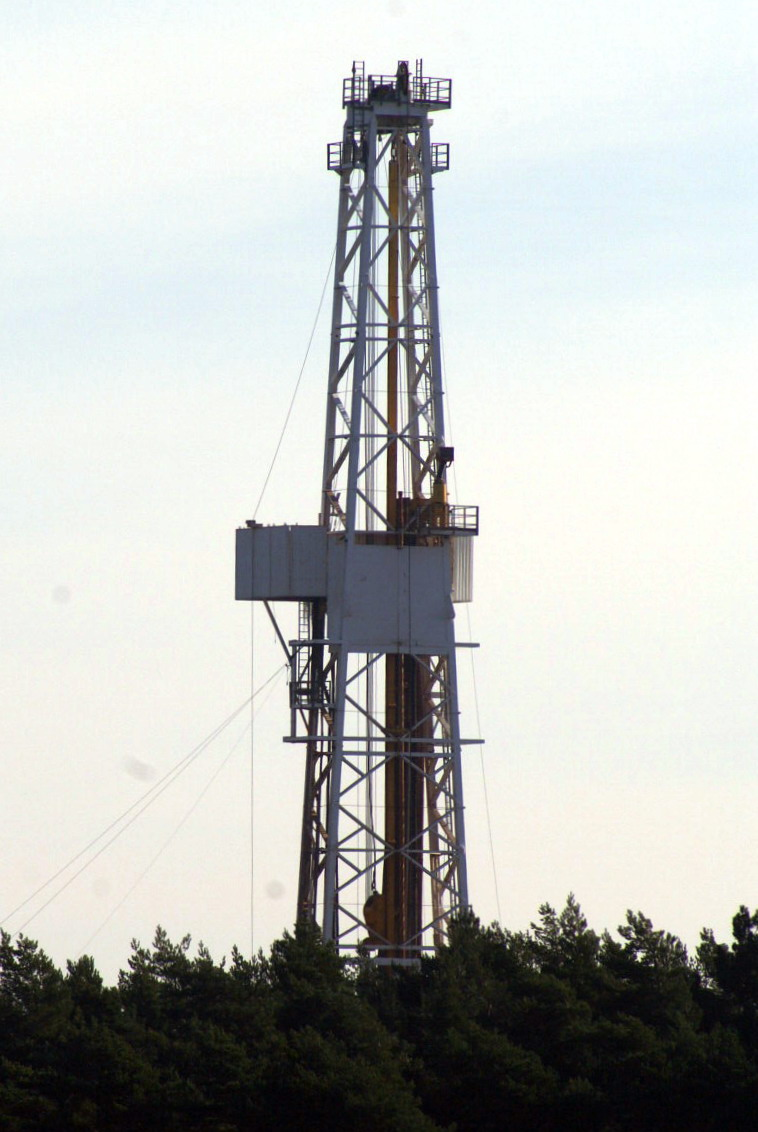
Well site M, Goathorn Peninsula

Production grew from 4,000 to 6,000 barrels per day (640 to 950 m^{3}/d) in 1984 and eventually peaked at 110,000 barrels per day (17,000 m^{3}/d) in 1997; by 2002 this had declined to 50,000 barrels per day (7,900 m^{3}/d). In 2002 it was estimated that the field contained reserves of 65.40 million tonnes of oil (479.6 million barrels), 4.73 million tonnes of natural gas liquids and 1.42 billion cubic metres (50×10^{9} cu ft) of natural gas that will last until 2020 and 2025 respectively.

Oil is also transported to Wytch Farm for processing from two smaller Dorset oilfields, Wareham (discovered in 1964) by pipeline and Kimmeridge Oil Field (discovered in 1959) by road.

Oil is piped about 91 kilometres (57 mi) from Wytch Farm via Fawley to a terminal on the far side of Southampton Water at Hamble, for export by tanker. Natural Gas (methane) is piped to Sopley, north of Christchurch, for use in the national domestic gas supply network. Smaller quantities of liquefied petroleum gas are transported by road. A rail terminal at Furzebrook connecting to the Swanage Railway between Corfe Castle and Wareham is now closed and mothballed.

=== Production process plant ===
The well fluids from the field and the remote well sites are combined at the gathering station. Oil is routed to the first stage separator where initial separation of the well fluids into its component parts takes place. Produced water settles to the bottom of the horizontal separator vessel, oil floats on the water layer and gas (vapour) occupies the top of the vessel. These three fluids are withdrawn continuously from the vessel to downstream plant.

Oil flows to further separators operating at lower pressures, where further vapour and produced water are separated and removed. The oil then passes to a desalter to reduce the salt content. Fresh water is added to the oil and the oil-water mixture which is allowed to settle. The salt dissolves preferentially in the water phase reducing the salt content of the oil. Treated oil is cooled and stored in tanks before finally being pumped through the 16-inch (0.4 m) pipeline to the storage and loading facility at Hamble.

The vapour from the separators is cooled, compressed and dehydrated by counter-current contact with glycol. It is chilled by refrigeration and routed to a series of fractionation towers. These include a de-ethaniser which separates the methane (CH_{4}) from ethane (C_{2}H_{6}). There is a depropaniser to remove propane (C_{3}H_{8}) and a debutaniser to remove butane (C_{4}H_{10}). Some of the gases – the methane and ethane – are used as fuel gas on the site, the rest is compressed, odorised (with tertiary butyl mercaptan) and is routed via a 8-inch (0.2 m) pipeline to Sopley near Christchurch where it enters the National Gas Grid. Propane and butane (known collectively as LPG or liquefied petroleum gas) are maintained as liquids, they are odorised (with ethyl mercaptan) and stored in horizontal vessels on the site. LPG is sold and transported from the site by road tanker.

Produced water from the separators is combined with treated site surface water and seawater and is injected into the reservoir via five wells. This provides a disposal route for oily water and maintains pressure in the reservoir.

There are several facilities that support oil and gas production, these include:

- Two open cycle gas turbines each with a capacity of 17.7 MW. The turbine exhaust stacks include waste heat recovery units
- Three ground flares (Low Temperature, Low Pressure and High Pressure) for emergency or maintenance flaring of gas
- Abstraction of seawater from Cleaval Point and Furzey Island
- Compressed air for plant instrumentation
- Generation and storage of liquid nitrogen
- Methanol for injection into gas streams to prevent hydrate formation
- Refrigeration system.

=== Oil specification ===
The produced oil has a gravity of 37/38°API, and a sulphur content of 0.1 to 0.2%.

The oil product sent to Hamble has the following properties:

Parameter	Value
API Gravity	40.2°API
Density at 15 °C	0.8237 kg/l
Sulphur by weight	0.12 %
Nitrogen	590 ppm
Reid Vapour Pressure	65.5 kPa
Pour Point	0 °C
Total Acid Number	0.1 mgKOH/g
Viscosity at 40 °C	4.4 cSt
Viscosity at 50 °C	3.6 cSt
Vanadium	0.2 ppm
Nickel	1 ppm

== See also ==
- Energy policy of the United Kingdom
- Energy use and conservation in the United Kingdom
