= Stoborough Green =

Village in Dorset, England

Coordinates: 50.6705°N 2.1045°W

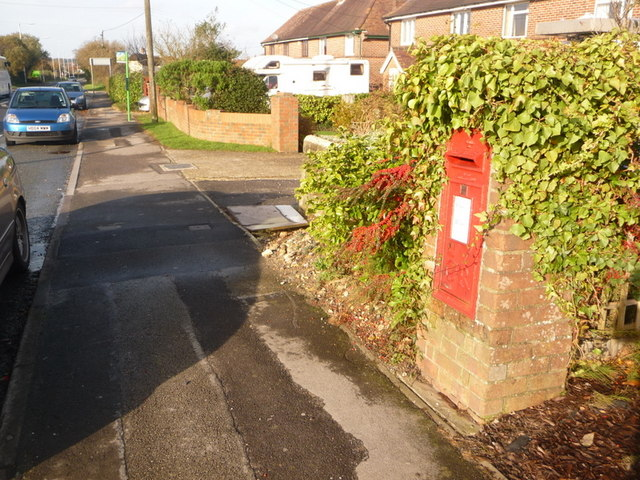
- Corfe Road, Stoborough Green

- Location within Dorset
- OS grid reference: SY927856
- Civil parish: Arne
- Unitary authority: Dorset
- Ceremonial county: Dorset
- Region: South West
- Country: England
- Sovereign state: United Kingdom
- Post town: WAREHAM
- Postcode district: BH20
- Dialling code: 01929
- Police: Dorset
- Fire: Dorset and Wiltshire
- Ambulance: South Western
- UK Parliament: Mid Dorset and North Poole

Stoborough Green is a village in the English county of Dorset. It is situated to the south of the village of Stoborough and about 2 kilometres south of the town of Wareham.

Stoborough Green forms part of the civil parish of Arne, within the Dorset unitary authority.
