= Purbeck Marble =

Fossiliferous limestone found in the Isle of Purbeck, Dorset, England

Purbeck Marble is a fossiliferous limestone found in the Isle of Purbeck, a peninsula in south-east Dorset, England. It is a variety of Purbeck stone that has been quarried since at least Roman times as a decorative building stone.

== Geology ==
Stratigraphically these limestone beds lie towards the top of the Durlston Formation of the Purbeck Group. They were deposited during the Berriasian age of the Early Cretaceous epoch. Purbeck Marble is not a metamorphic rock, like a true marble, but is so-called because it can take a fine polish. Its characteristic appearance comes from densely packed shells of the freshwater snail Viviparus. Sussex Marble is similar in type. The 'marble' is properly classified as a biomicrudite, as it consists of large clasts (the snail shells) in a fine-grained limestone mud matrix.

The individual marble beds (also known as 'seams'), lie between layers of softer marine clays and mudstone, laid down during repeated marine ingressions. Some of the beds contain iron oxide/hydroxide minerals, such as hematite or limonite, giving red or brown varieties, while other beds contain glauconite giving a green (or occasionally blue) colour.

== Occurrence ==
Purbeck Marble is found at outcrop, or beneath superficial cover, all the way across the Isle of Purbeck from Worbarrow Tout in the west to Peveril Point in the east. The marble beds are never more than 1.2 m thick and are often much thinner. The outcrops lie within the Purbeck Monocline, with the beds dipping moderately steeply to the north.

== Use ==
There is a single example of Purbeck Marble being used during the Bronze Age, in a cist at Langton Matravers. During the Romano-British period, Purbeck Marble was used for inscriptions, architectural mouldings and veneers, mortars and pestles, and other articles.

Purbeck Marble was also quarried in medieval times and can be seen in virtually all the cathedrals of the south of England, in columns and slab panels and flooring. For example, it is used in Exeter, Ely, Norwich, Chichester, Salisbury, Lincoln, Llandaff, Southwark and Canterbury Cathedrals, and in Westminster Abbey. Additionally, it was utilised in the 13th-century King's Table, a furnishing previously used in coronation events.

It has been less used in modern times, but a remarkable example is the church at Kingston, Purbeck, Dorset built in 1874–1880.

Other strata of Purbeck Limestone are being quarried as of 2021. Purbeck Marble was previously extracted in 1993.

Purbeck Marble is used by a number of contemporary sculptors, such as Emily Young.

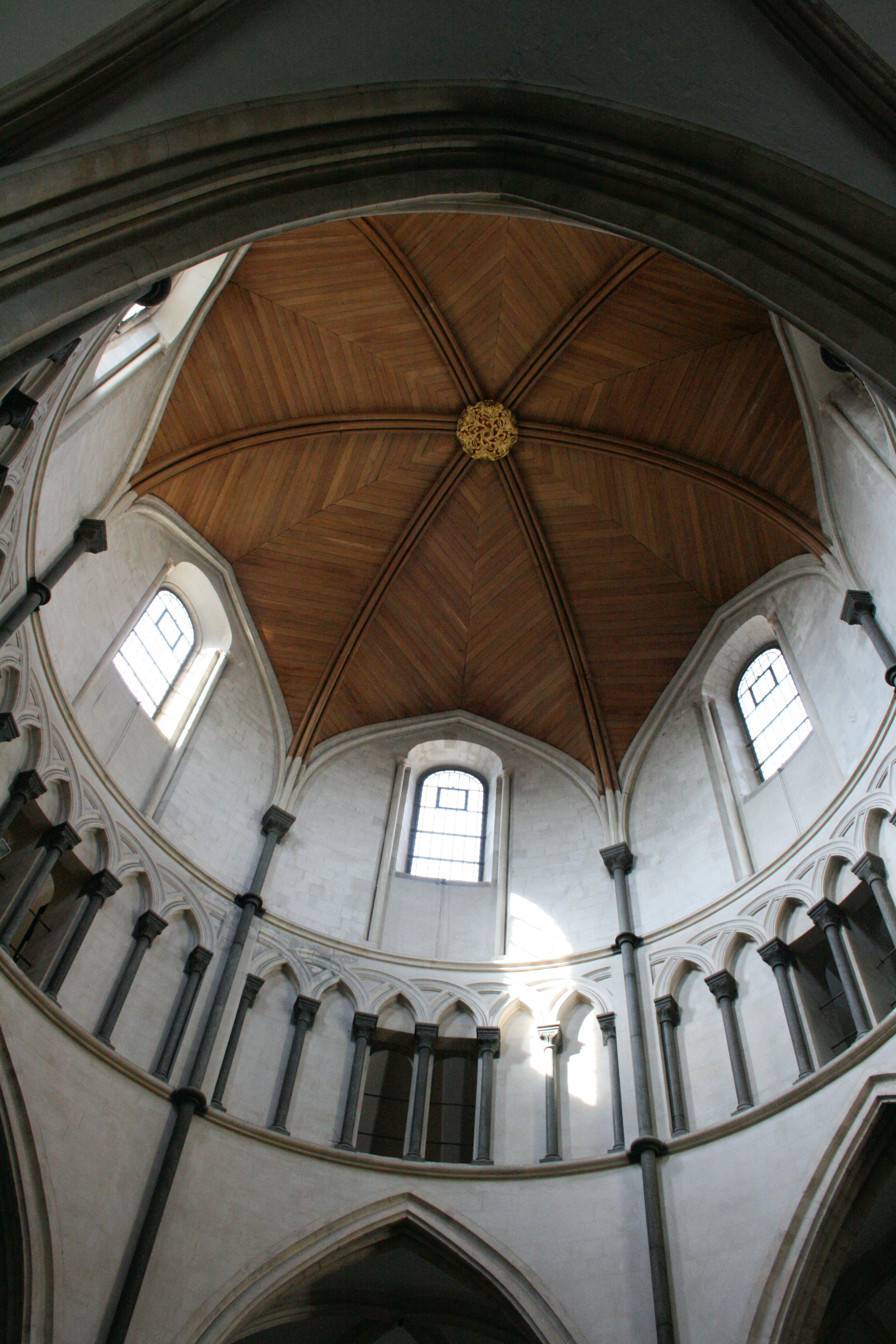
Interlaced semicircular arches supported by Purbeck Marble shafts in the Temple Church, London

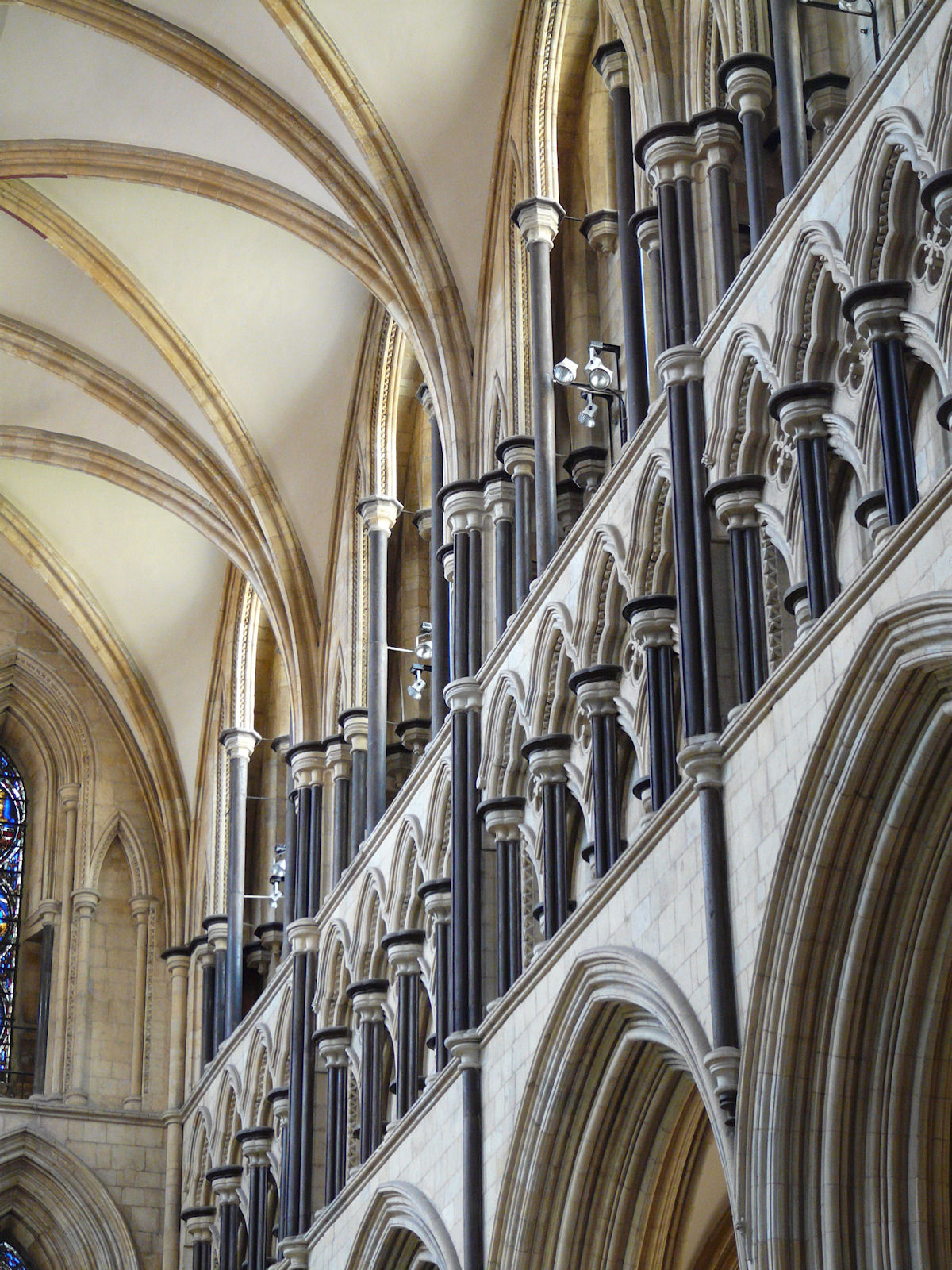
The 13th-century south transept of Beverley Minster, richly decorated with Purbeck Marble shafts.

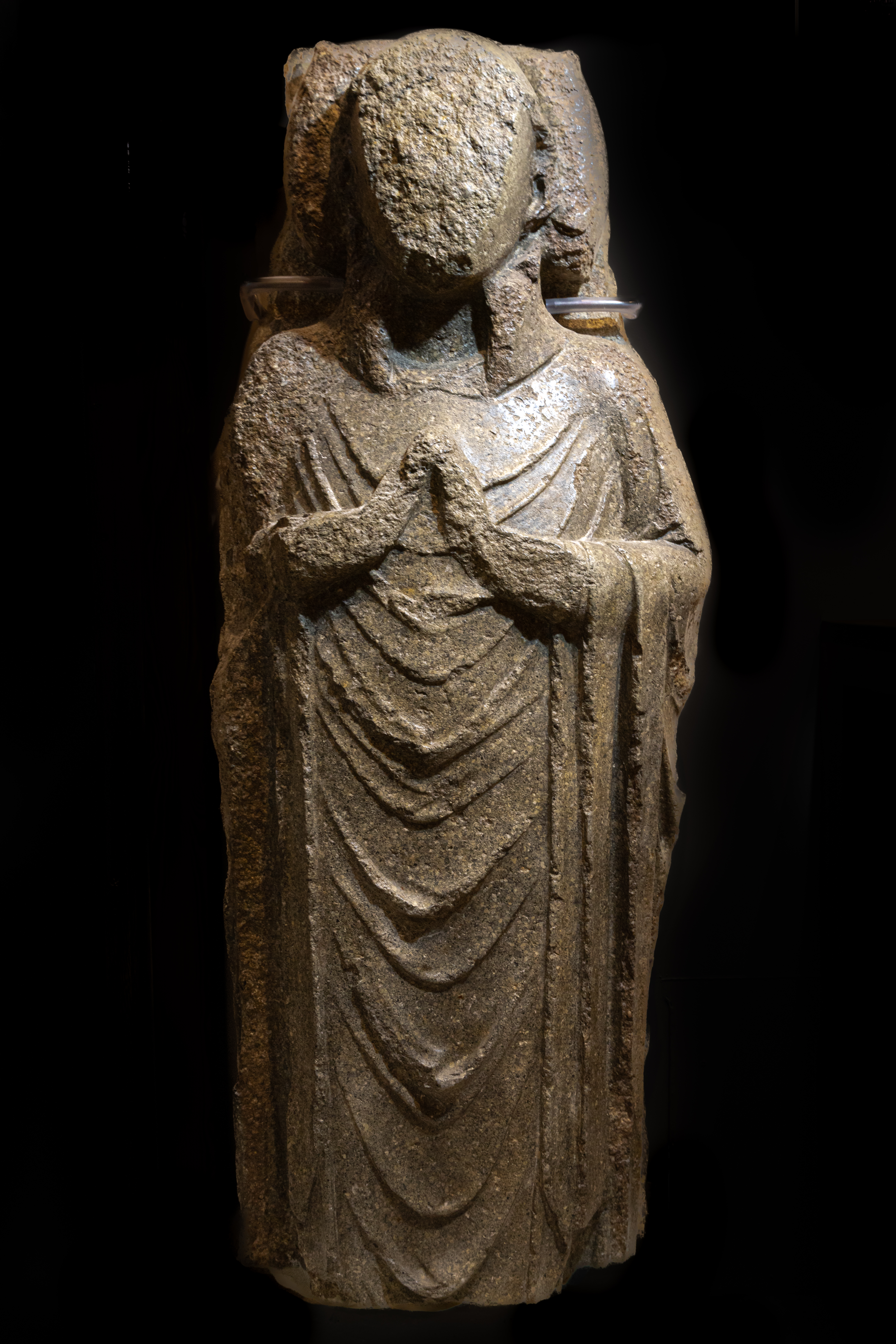
A carved sculpture in Purbeck Marble of a priest on a coffin lid from the Shaftesbury Abbey collection.
