= Worbarrow Tout =

Headland in Dorset, England

Coordinates: 50.6156°N 2.185°W

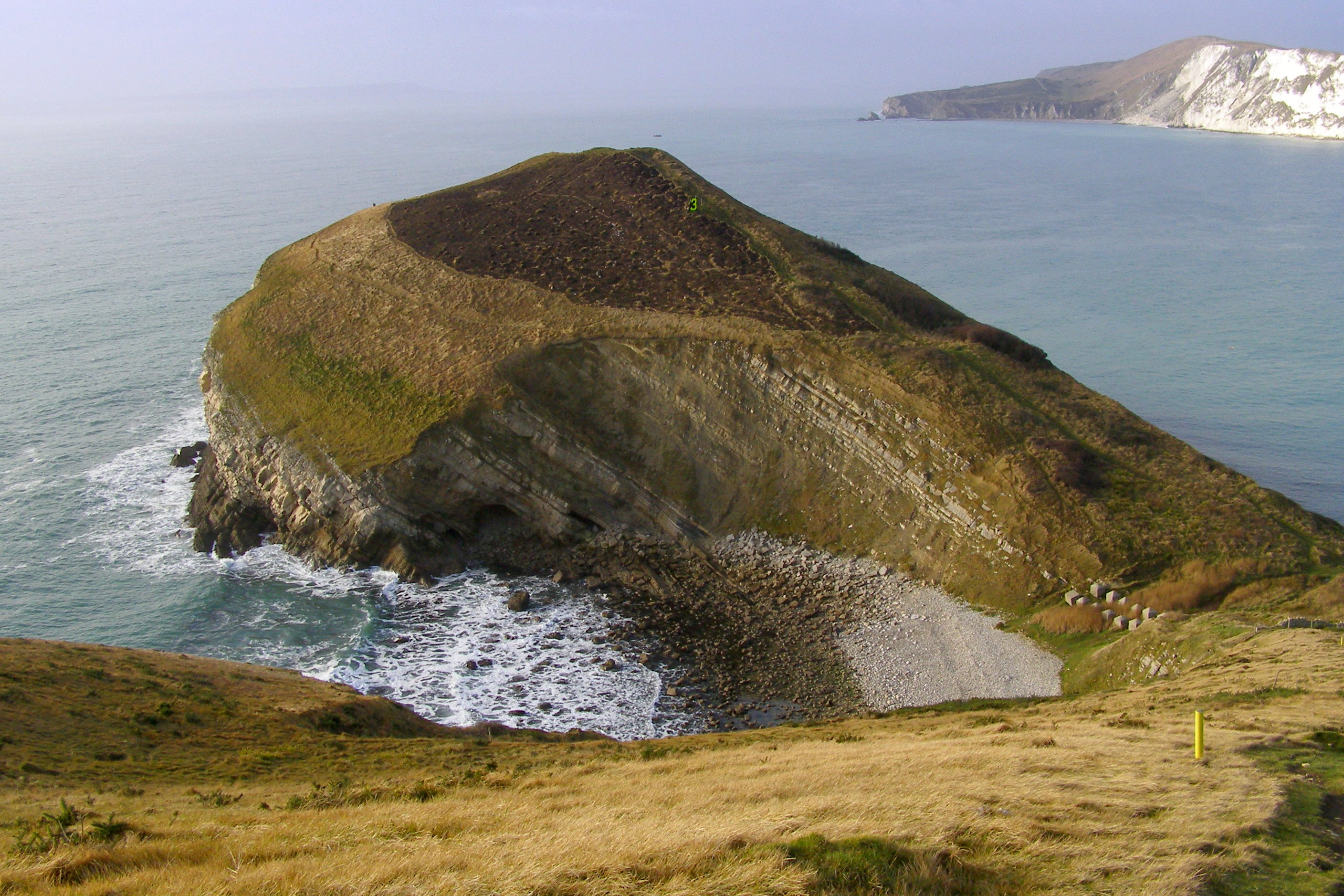
Worbarrow Tout behind Pondfield Cove

Worbarrow Tout is a promontory at the eastern end of Worbarrow Bay on Isle of Purbeck in Dorset on the south coast of England, about 6 kilometres (3.7 mi) south of Wareham and about 16 kilometres (10 mi) west of Swanage.

It has pedestrian access from the deserted village of Tyneham when the Lulworth Ranges are open, via a track about 1,500 yards long, although access to climb Worbarrow Tout itself is always restricted due to possible unexploded ordinance. Immediately to its east is Pondfield Cove, a small cove with a pebble beach.

Worbarrow Tout ("tout" means lookout) was originally part of Gad Cliff to its east, but sea erosion has virtually separated the two completely. There are hiking trails around the area, and it lies on the South West Coast Path.

== Geology ==
The Tout has a distinct pointed shape in the form of a small hill. It has steep angular layers of rock that visibly demonstrate the complex sedimentary folding that affected this area, and that was caused by tectonic pressures as the African and European continents collided some 30 million years ago. The cliff sediments were then twisted horizontally, and this is why the Chalks that are between 85 and 145 million years old are found at the rear of the bay. The sediments that face the sea at the front of the bay and form the peninsula Worbarrow Tout are the 150-million-year-old Portland limestones and 147-million-year-old Purbeck Beds.

== Fossil zone ==
The localities along the Jurassic Coast include a large range of important fossil zones. The Purbeck lagoonal limestones and the shales that are exposed in the cliffs of Worbarrow Tout contain dinosaur footprints and have abundant brackish water bivalves, gastropods and ostracods.

The rocky seabed is the most easterly location on the south coast for colonies of a rare and protected species of slow-growing coral, called the Pink sea fan. This is one of only two species of fan-corals that are to be found in British waters.
