= Gad Cliff =

Cliff in Dorset, England

Coordinates: 50.61525°N 2.16865°W

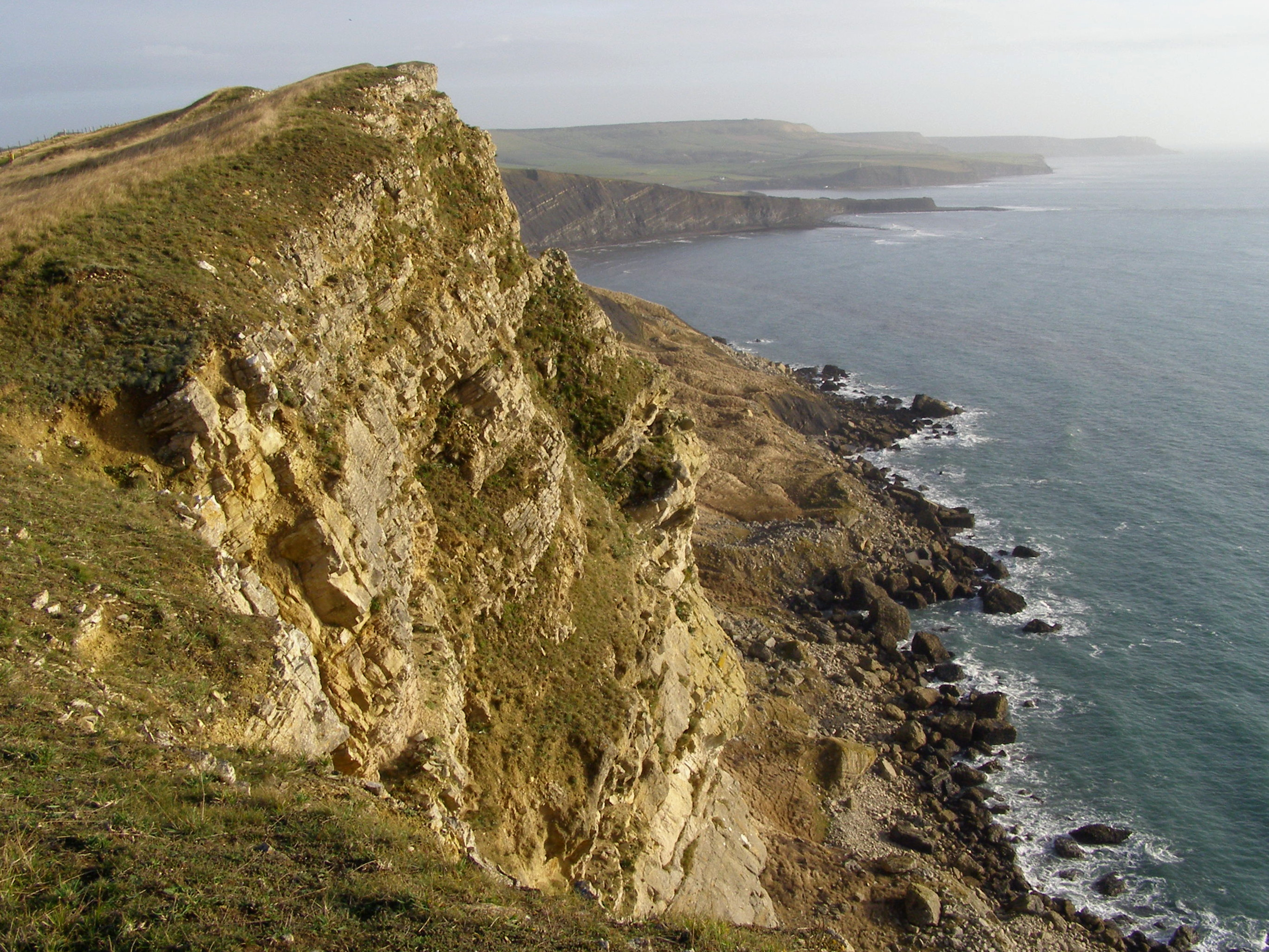
Gad Cliff.

Gad Cliff is a south-facing cliff face, immediately to the east of Worbarrow Tout and Pondfield Cove, on the south coast of the Isle of Purbeck in Dorset, England. Behind it is Gold Down, part of the Lulworth Ranges.

== Location ==
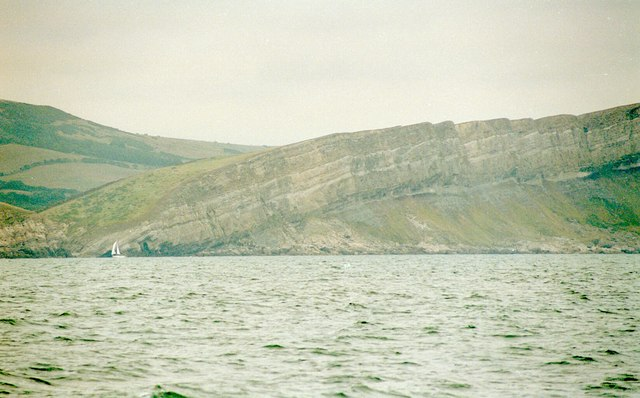
Worbarrow Tout, Pondfield Cove and Gad Cliff.

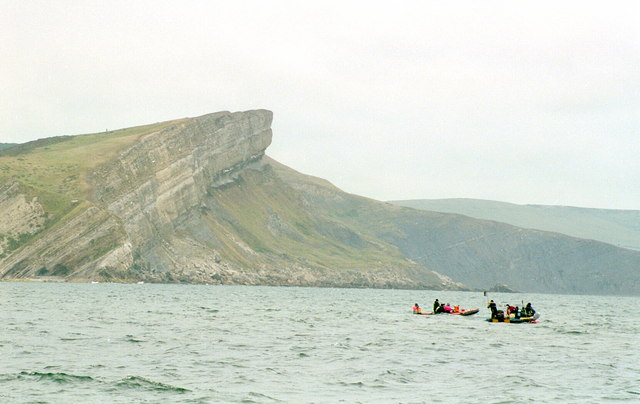
Worbarrow Tout and Gad Cliff - view from the sea off Worbarrow Bay.

Gad Cliff is located about 1 kilometre (0.62 mi) south of the ghost village of Tyneham and about six kilometres south of Wareham. Gad Cliff is about 2 kilometres (1.2 mi) west of Kimmeridge Bay and about 14 kilometres (8.7 mi) due west of Swanage.

Gad Cliff is only accessible when the Lulworth Ranges are open to the public. It can be reached either by an up hill walk from the car park alongside the ghost village of Tyneham, or alternatively via coastal walk from Kimmeridge Bay along the South West Coast Path.

The highest point of Gad Cliff is about 134 metres (440 ft) above sea-level. Gold Down is the most western part of this cliff face. Wagon Rock is a large boulder that has fallen from the upper parts of Gad Cliff onto the shoreline below.

== Geology ==
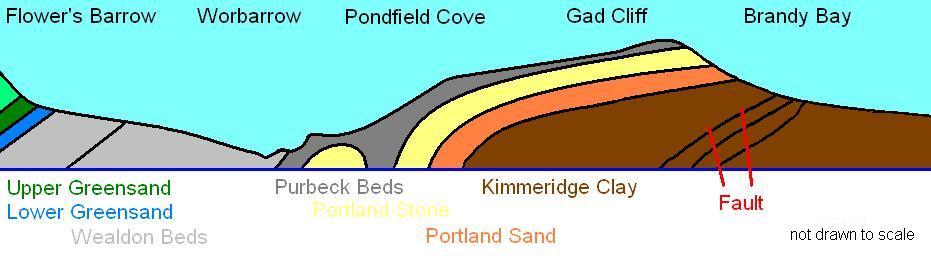
Geology of the coast line from Worbarrow Bay to Gad Cliff.

The geology of the Isle of Purbeck is very complex and this is shown very clearly along this stretch of coast. The extreme angular layers of rock visibly demonstrate the complex sedimentary folding that affected this area. The foldings, known as the Purbeck Monocline, took place some 30 million years ago and were caused by the tectonic pressures as the African and European continents collided. During this period, the sediments were twisted horizontally, this is why the younger Cretaceous formations are found at the rear of Worbarrow Bay. At Gad Cliff the sediments dip inland at an angle of 25 to 35 degrees. At the top of the cliffs it is clearly visible that the rocks have been folded into a huge S shaped kink as the result of earth movements.

The uppermost of Gad Cliff is formed by the Purbeck Beds, 147 million, and of Portland limestones, 150 million years old. These lie over a layer of Portland Sands and the underlying Kimmeridge Clay, which is about 155 million years old. The upper layer of the Kimmeridge Clay belongs the Kimmeridgian Stage sensu anglico. Due to the fact that harder Limestones and Sandstones are underlain by an unstable Clay, the cliff face is prone to landslides. At the very western end of Gad Cliff is Worbarrow Tout, which forms the southern bastion enclosing Worbarrow Bay, which is cut into the comparatively soft clays and sands of the Wealden Beds.
