= List of shipwrecks in November 1838 =

The list of shipwrecks in November 1838 includes ships sunk, foundered, grounded, or otherwise lost during November 1838.

== 1 November ==
List of shipwrecks: 1 November 1838
Ship	State	Description
Abispo	Flag unknown	The ship was driven ashore and wrecked at Mazatlán, Mexico.
Friedrich Wilhelm	Stettin	The ship was driven ashore and sank near Thisted, Denmark. She was on a voyage from Stettin to Berwick upon Tweed, Northumberland, United Kingdom.
Griffin	United States	The brig was driven ashore and wrecked at Mazatlán with the loss of her captain, William Coffin Little. She was on a voyage from China to the United States.
Indus	United States	The brig was driven ashore and severely damaged at Mazatlán. She was later refloated. Indus was on a voyage from Valparaíso, Chile to the United States.
Mary	United States	The brig was driven ashore and wrecked at Mazatlán with the loss of three of her crew.
Splendid	United States	The brig was driven ashore and wrecked at Mazatlán with the loss of six lives. She was on a voyage from Guayaquil, Ecuador to the United States.
Venus	Flag unknown	The ship was driven ashore and wrecked at Mazatlán.

== 2 November ==
List of shipwrecks: 2 November 1838
Ship	State	Description
Alexy and Varna	Russia	The ship was driven ashore on "Wrangel Island". She was on a voyage from Saint Petersburg to Reval.
Alida von Wangeroog	Kingdom of Hanover	The galiot was abandoned in the North Sea off Heligoland. She was on a voyage from London, United Kingdom to Wangeroog.
Autumn	United Kingdom	The ship ran aground on the Shipwash Sand, in the North Sea off the coast of Suffolk. She was refloated and put into Harwich, Essex.
Canning	United Kingdom	The ship was driven ashore at Portsmouth, Hampshire. She was on a voyage from Seaham, County Durham to Portsmouth.
Charlotte	United Kingdom	The brig sank 2 nautical miles (3.7 km) off Puffin Island, Anglesey. Her crew were rescued by the Beaumaris pilot boat.
David	United Kingdom	The ship was abandoned whilst on a voyage from Labrador, British North America to Livorno, Grand Duchy of Tuscany.
Forth	pUnited Kingdom	The sloop was driven ashore and wrecked between Kirktownhead and Scotstownhead, Aberdeenshire with the loss of all hands. She was on a voyage from Newcastle upon Tyne, Northumberland to Inverness.
James and Ann	United Kingdom	The ship was driven ashore and capsized at Bridgwater, Somerset.
Louise	Hamburg	The ship was in collision with another vessel off the west coast of "Hochlands" and sank. She was on a voyage from Kronstadt, Russia to Hamburg.
Pensher	United Kingdom	The brig was driven ashore at Sunderland, County Durham. she was later refloated.
Svatoy Nicolay	Russia	The ship was driven ashore on Wrangel Island. She was on a voyage from Saint Petersburg to Reval.
Svatoy Nieulay	Russia	The ship was driven ashore on Wrangel Island. She was on a voyage from Saint Petersburg to Reval.

== 3 November ==
List of shipwrecks: 3 November 1838
Ship	State	Description
Aurora	Netherlands	The ship was driven ashore at Wierum, Friesland. She was refloated on 19 November.
Eliza	United Kingdom	The ship was abandoned in the Bristol Channel. Her crew were rescued. She was subsequently towed into Pill, Somerset.
Elizabeth	United Kingdom	The ship sank in Cranfield Bay. She was on a voyage from Glasgow, Renfrewshire to Cardiff, Glamorgan. Elizabeth was refloated on 21 January 1839 and taken into Warren Point, County Antrim.
Ferdinand	Netherlands	The ship ran aground near Wangeroog, Kingdom of Hanover. She was on a voyage from Schiedam, South Holland to Rostock.
Hope	United Kingdom	The ship was driven ashore at Maryport, Cumberland. She was later refloated.
Jacob Philip	Netherlands	The ship was wrecked off Gothenburg, Sweden. She was on a voyage from Dordrecht, South Holland to Rostock.
John White	United Kingdom	The ship was driven ashore and severely damaged at Alnmouth, Northumberland.
Mary Marsden	United Kingdom	The ship was run into by Bellona (United Kingdom) and was severely damaged at Milford Haven, Pembrokeshire. She was consequently beached.
Sarah	United Kingdom	The ship sank off the Gunfleet Sand, in the North Sea off the coast of Essex. Her crew were rescued. She was on a voyage from South Shields, County Durham to Portsmouth, Hampshire.
Thomas Wood	United Kingdom	The ship sprang a leak and was beached at Caister-on-Sea, Norfolk. She was refloated and taken into Great Yarmouth.

== 4 November ==
List of shipwrecks: 4 November 1838
Ship	State	Description
Elizabeth	United Kingdom	The ship ran aground and sank at Carlingford, County Louth. She was on a voyage from Glasgow, Renfrewshire to Cardiff, Glamorgan.
Lima	United Kingdom	The ship was in collision with another vessel and then ran aground on the Newcombe Sand, in the North Sea off the coast of Norfolk. She was later refloated.
Sheffield	United Kingdom	The brig was last sighted on this date whilst on a voyage from Swinefleet, Lincolnshire to London. Presumed subsequently foundered with the loss of all hands.
Swift	United Kingdom	The schooner ran aground on the Shipwash Sand, in the North Sea off the coast of Suffolk. She was on a voyage from London to Selby, Yorkshire. Swift was refloated and put into Wivenhoe, Essex.
Thetis	United Kingdom	The ship ran aground on the Cross Sand, in the North Sea off the coast of Norfolk. She was later refloated.
Vesper	United Kingdom	The ship was driven ashore at Boscastle, Cornwall.

== 5 November ==
List of shipwrecks: 5 November 1838
Ship	State	Description
African Packet	United Kingdom	The brig was driven ashore at Bayonne, Basses-Pyrénées, France with the loss of six of her ten crew. She was on a voyage from Guayaquil, Ecuador to Bilbao, Spain and Bordeaux, Gironde, France.
Boulby	United Kingdom	The ship foundered in the North Sea off the coast of Yorkshire between Runswick Bay and Staithes.
Levant	United States	The ship was driven ashore at South Shields, County Durham, United Kingdom.

== 6 November ==
List of shipwrecks: 6 November 1838
Ship	State	Description
Alicia	United Kingdom	The ship was wrecked near Torbay, Newfoundland, British North America. Her crew were rescued. She was on a voyage from Newfoundland to Halifax, Nova Scotia, British North America.
Diligence	United Kingdom	The transport ship was driven ashore at Blockhouse Point, Hampshire.
Eugene	France	The ship foundered off Noirmont Point with the loss of her captain. She was on a voyage from Saint-Malo, Ille-et-Vilaine to Jersey, Channel Islands.
Hebe	United Kingdom	The ship was driven ashore in Cranfield Bay. She was later refloated and taken into Warrenpoint, County Down.
John	United Kingdom	The ship was driven ashore in Cranfield Bay. She was later refloated and taken into Warrenpoint.
Lady Charlotte	United Kingdom	The paddle steamer was driven ashore at Pill, Somerset.
Lovely Nelly	United Kingdom	The ship ran aground at the mouth of the River Tees and was damaged. She was consequently beached at Hartlepool, County Durham. Lovely Nelly was on a voyage from the River Tees to King's Lynn, Norfolk.
Margaret	United Kingdom	The ship was driven ashore in Cranfield Bay. She was later refloated and taken into Warrenpoint.
Shepherd	United Kingdom	The ship was driven ashore on the Isle of Man. She was on a voyage from Newry, County Antrim to Lancaster, Lancashire. Shepherd was refloated and taken into Castletown.
Unanimity	United Kingdom	The ship departed from South Shields, County Durham for Porto, Portugal. No further trace, presumed foundered with the loss of all hands.

== 7 November ==
List of shipwrecks: 7 November 1838
Ship	State	Description
Ann	United Kingdom	The ship departed from Quebec City, Lower Canada, British North America for a Welsh port. No further trace, presumed foundered with the loss of all hands.
David	United Kingdom	The ship was driven ashore in the Dardanelles. She was later refloated and taken into Constantinople, Ottoman Empire, where she arrived on 16 November.
Elizabeth	United Kingdom	The ship was driven ashore at Soldiers Point, County Down.
Farnham	United Kingdom	The ship was driven ashore and wrecked at Cranfield Point, County Louth.
Hero	United Kingdom	The ship was wrecked on the Cross Sand, in the North Sea off the coast of Essex with the loss of her captain. She was on a voyage from London to the Shetland Islands.
Ruby	United Kingdom	The ship was driven ashore south of Holyhead, Anglesey. She was on a voyage from Liverpool, Lancashire to Gibraltar. Ruby was later refloated and taken into Holyhead.
Thistle	United Kingdom	The ship was wrecked near Saint John, New Brunswick, British North America. Her crew were rescued. She was on a voyage from Saint John to Cork.
William	United Kingdom	The ship foundered in the Irish Sea off Dublin. Her crew survived. She was on a voyage from Ardrossan, Ayrshire to Dublin.
Zuleika	United Kingdom	The ship ran aground off Syros, Greece. She was later refloated.

== 8 November ==
List of shipwrecks: 8 November 1838
Ship	State	Description
Equator	Netherlands	The ship was driven ashore at Manasquan, New Jersey. She was on a voyage from Rotterdam, South Holland to New York United States.
Fruiterer	United Kingdom	The ship departed from Weymouth, Dorset for São Miguel Island, Azores. No further trace, presumed foundered with the loss of all hands.
Johannes	Stettin	The ship driven ashore on Saaremaa, Russia. She was on a voyage from Pärnu, Russia to Stettin.
William and Robert	United Kingdom	The ship, which had capsized on 3 November, was abandoned in the Atlantic Ocean. Her crew were rescued. She was on a voyage from Saint John, New Brunswick, British North America to Galway

== 9 November ==
List of shipwrecks: 9 November 1838
Ship	State	Description
Brenda	United Kingdom	The ship ran aground off Læsø, Denmark. She was on a voyage from Riga, Russia to Hull, Yorkshire. Brenda was later refloated and put into "Kanso".
Catherine	United Kingdom	The ship was driven ashore and wrecked near Donaghadee, County Down. Her crew were rescued. She was on a voyage from Belfast, County Antrim to Donaghadee.
Friendship	United Kingdom	The ship ran aground at Southwold, Suffolk. She was on a voyage from Southwold to Sunderland, County Durham. Friendship was refloated and put back to Southwold.
Joseph Hume	United Kingdom	The ship ran aground off Læsø. She was on a voyage from Saint Petersburg, Russia to London. Joseph Hume was later refloated and put into Gothenburg for repairs.
Lady Williamson	United Kingdom	The ship was driven ashore and wrecked in the Îles des Madeleines. Her crew were rescued. She was on a voyage from Singapore to London.
Palmyra	Flag unknown	The ship was driven ashore in Brandon Bay. Her crew were rescued. She was on a voyage from Bergen, Norway to Trieste; or from Tromsø, Norway to Tarragona, Spain.
Pheasant	United Kingdom	The ship ran aground at Waterford. She was on a voyage from Waterford to Gloucester.

== 10 November ==
List of shipwrecks: 10 November 1838
Ship	State	Description
Brothers	United Kingdom	The ship departed from Swansea, Glamorgan for Malta. No further trace, presumed foundered with the loss of all hands.
Catherine	United Kingdom	The ship was driven ashore and wrecked on the coast of County Down. She was on a voyage from Belfast, County Antrim to Donaghadee, County Down.
Catherine	United Kingdom	The ship ran aground on the Cant, off the coast of Kent. She was on a voyage from "Marianople" to London. Catherine was refloated the next day and resumed her voyage the day after.
Duchess of Gordon	United Kingdom	The sloop was sighted whilst on a voyage from Newcastle upon Tyne, Northumberland to Port Gordon, Morayshire. She subsequently foundered off Rattray Head, Aberdeenshire with the loss of all three crew.
Paragon	United Kingdom	The ship ran aground in the Clyde. She was on a voyage from Arkhangelsk, Russia to Greenock, Renfrewshire. Paragon was refloated later that day.
Ruby	United Kingdom	The sloop ran aground on the Herd Sand, in the North Sea off the coast of County Durham and was damaged. Her crew were rescued by the South Shields Lifeboat. She was on a voyage from Sunderland, County Durham to Aberdeen. Ruby was refloated on 12 November.
Titania	Rostock	The ship was wrecked off Læsø, Denmark. Her crew were rescued. She was on a voyage from an English port to Rostock.

== 11 November ==
List of shipwrecks: 11 November 1838
Ship	State	Description
Dart	United Kingdom	The ship ran aground on the Jenkin Sand. She was on a voyage from Sunderland, County Durham to London.
Eclair	France	The steamship was driven into a bridge at Bordeaux, Gironde and sank.
Mary	United Kingdom	The ship ran aground on the Herd Sand, in the North Sea off the coast of County Durham and was damaged. She was on a voyage from Dundee, Forfarshire to South Shields, County Durham. Mary was later refloated and taken into South Shields in a leaky condition.
Progress	United Kingdom	The ship ran aground on the Nore.
Thetis	United Kingdom	The ship was driven ashore at Margate, Kent. She was refloated on 13 November and taken into Margate.
Triumphante	Spain	The ship was wrecked 60 nautical miles (110 km) north of Cape Florida, Florida Territory. All on board were rescued. She was on a voyage from Havana, Cuba to Cádiz.

== 12 November ==
List of shipwrecks: 12 November 1838
Ship	State	Description
Ann	United Kingdom	The barque was driven ashore at Deal, Kent. Her crew were rescued. She was on a voyage from Hull, Yorkshire to Sierra Leone. Ann was later refloated and taken into Ramsgate, Kent.
Ann	United Kingdom	The ship ran aground on the Nore and sank. All on board were rescued. She was on a voyage from Berwick upon Tweed, Northumberland to London. She was refloated on 17 November and taken into Sheerness, Kent.
Ceres	United Kingdom	The ship ran aground on the Nore. She was on a voyage from Newcastle upon Tyne, Northumberland to London.
Coundon	United Kingdom	The ship ran aground on the Scharhorn Reef. She was on a voyage from Stockton-on-Tees, County Durham to Hamburg. Coundon was later refloated and resumed her voyage.
Hermann	Flag unknown	The ship was driven ashore and wrecked at Deal, Kent. Her crew were rescued. She was on a voyage from Newcastle upon Tyne to Naples, Kingdom of the Two Sicilies.
Martha	United Kingdom	The ship was driven ashore at Great Yarmouth, Norfolk. She was on a voyage from London to Newcastle upon Tyne, Northumberland. Martha was refloated on 16 November and taken into Great Yarmouth.
Sir Howard Douglas	United Kingdom	The ship was wrecked at "Polunga, Lapland". Her crew were rescued. She was on a voyage from Onega, Russia to London.
William and Ann	United Kingdom	The brig was driven ashore and wrecked 7 nautical miles (13 km) east of Calais, France. Her crew were rescued. She was on a voyage from Newcastle upon Tyne, Northumberland to Algiers, Algeria.

== 13 November ==
List of shipwrecks: 13 November 1838
Ship	State	Description
Bolivar	United Kingdom	The ship was driven ashore and severely damaged at Newport, Monmouthshire.
Cherkaj-Schergf	Ottoman Empire	The schooner was driven ashore and wrecked in the Bay of Patras. Nineteen of the twenty people on board had been murdered shortly before and her cargo had been plundered by the pirate crew of a Greek brig.
Gardner	United Kingdom	The ship was driven ashore at Vlissingen, Zeeland, Netherlands. She was on a voyage from Antwerp, Belgium to Liverpool, Lancashire. She was later refloated.
Gloria	(Russian Empire) Grand Duchy of Finland	The ship was wrecked off Ameland, Friesland, Netherlands. Her crew were rescued. She was on a voyage from Pori to London, United Kingdom.
Milo	United Kingdom	The brig was wrecked on the Hogsty Reef with the loss of two lives. Seventeen survivors took to the longboat; they were rescued by Francis (United States). Milo was on a voyage from St. Jago de Cuba, Cuba to Swansea, Glamorgan.

== 14 November ==
List of shipwrecks: 14 November 1838
Ship	State	Description
Caroline	Sweden	The ship was driven ashore on "Magmisholm". Her crew were rescued.
Castalia	United Kingdom	The ship was driven ashore at Bedeque, Prince Edward Island, British North America. She was on a voyage from Prince Edward Island to Plymouth, Devon. Castalia was refloated on 18 April 1839 and taken into a port on Prince Edward Island on 8 May.
Kellie Castle	United Kingdom	The ship was wrecked on the Louisa Shoal, in the China Seas. She was on a voyage from Calcutta, India to Canton, China.

== 15 November ==
List of shipwrecks: 15 November 1838
Ship	State	Description
Canopus	United Kingdom	The ship ran aground and was severely damaged at Jersey, Channel Islands. She was on a voyage from Jersey to Rio de Janeiro, Brazil.
Jungfer Catharina	Prussia	The ship ran aground on the Hindert Sand. She was on a voyage from Liebau to Rotterdam, South Holland, Netherlands.
La Jeune	Belgium	The ship was beached at Grimsby, Lincolnshire, United Kingdom. She was on a voyage from Hull, Yorkshire, United Kingdom to Antwerp.
Ligura	Portugal	The ship was wrecked on the coast of Pará, Brazil. She was on a voyage from Lisbon to a Brazilian port.
Margaretha Elisabeth	Prussia	The ship was driven ashore at Busum, Duchy of Holstein. She was on a voyage from Kiel to London, United Kingdom.
Norfolk	United Kingdom	The barque was driven ashore at "Cape Magnusholm", Russia. Her twelve crew were rescued. She was on a voyage from Reval, Russia to Hull.
Staffa	United Kingdom	The ship was driven ashore at "St. Steffano", Ottoman Empire. She was later refloated.
Swift	United Kingdom	The ship was wrecked in the Magdalen Islands, Lower Canada, British North America. She was on a voyage from Málaga, Spain to Montreal, Lower Canada.

== 16 November ==
List of shipwrecks: 16 November 1838
Ship	State	Description
Apollo	France	The ship was driven ashore on "Point Cuerle". She was on a voyage from Naples, Kingdom of the Two Sicilies to Venice, Kingdom of Lombardy–Venetia.
Hector	Flag unknown	The ship ran aground at Rio de Janeiro, Brazil. She was on a voyage from Rio de Janeiro to Trieste.
Rhine	Netherlands	The ship was driven ashore at Boulmer, Northumberland, United Kingdom. She was on a voyage from Leith, Lothian, United Kingdom to Rotterdam, South Holland. Rhine was later refloated.

== 17 November ==
List of shipwrecks: 17 November 1838
Ship	State	Description
Echo	United Kingdom	The ship was wrecked at Plymouth, Devon with the loss of one of her seven crew. She was on a voyage from Youghal, County Cork to London.
Larkins	British East India Company	The East Indiaman struck the Wolf Rock, Cornwall and was damaged. She was on a voyage from Calcutta, India to London. Larkins landed her passengers at Penzance, Cornwall and then put into Falmouth leaking severely.
Leda	United Kingdom	The ship was wrecked on the Shipwash Sand, in the North Sea off the coast of Essex. Her crew were rescued by the smack Pearl (United Kingdom). Leda was on a voyage from Newcastle upon Tyne, Northumberland to London.
Mary	United Kingdom	The ship was driven ashore in the Gut of Canso. She was on a voyage from Saint John, New Brunswick, British North America to the Clyde.
Ocean	United Kingdom	The ship was wrecked in the Middle Swin. Her crew were rescued. She was on a voyage from Sunderland, County Durham to London.

== 18 November ==
List of shipwrecks: 18 November 1838
Ship	State	Description
Elizabeth	United Kingdom	The ship ran aground off Balbriggan, County Dublin and was beached. She was on a voyage from Workington, Cumberland to Balbriggan.
Essai	Flag unknown	The ship was run into in the Eider and was beached. She was on a voyage from Königsberg, Prussia to Hamburg.
George	United Kingdom	The ship ran aground at Balbriggan and was beached. She was on a voyage from Troon, Ayrshire to Balbriggan. She was later refloated and put into Workington, Cumberland, where she arrived on 6 December.
Great Britain	(United Kingdom of Great Britain and Ireland) British North America	The steamboat was destroyed by fire at Kingston, Ontario.
John	United Kingdom	The ship was wrecked near Dungarvan, County Antrim with the loss of all but one of her crew. She was on a voyage from Swansea, Glamorgan to Dungarvan.
Liberty	United Kingdom	The ship foundered in the North Sea off the coast of Norfolk with the loss of all hands.
Ocean	United Kingdom	The schooner was wrecked on the Middle Sand, in the North Sea off the coast of Essex. Her crew were rescued by the smack Beulah (United Kingdom). She was on a voyage from Sunderland, County Durham to London.
Persian	United Kingdom	The ship caught fire at Havana, Cuba and was scuttled. She was on a voyage from Llanelly, Glamorgan to Havana. Persian was consequently condemned.
Rochester Castle	United Kingdom	The ship ran aground on The Platters. She was on a voyage from Blyth, Northumberland to Ipswich, Suffolk. Rochester Castle was later refloated and resumed her voyage.
St. John	United Kingdom	The ship was wrecked on the Runners Rock, in the Irish Sea with the loss of five of her six crew. She was on a voyage from Swansea, Glamorgan to Dungarvan, County Antrim.
Zwei Gebruders	Bremen	The ship was in collision with a Hanoverian ship in the Eider and was severely damaged. She was on a voyage from Bremen to Stettin.

== 19 November ==
List of shipwrecks: 19 November 1838
Ship	State	Description
Caroline	United Kingdom	The ship was in collision with La Rose (France) and foundered in the Bristol Channel off Milford Haven, Pembrokeshire. Her crew were rescued by La Rose. Caroline was on a voyage from Newport, Monmouthshire to Glasgow, Renfrewshire.
Coriander	United Kingdom	The ship was struck a rock off Inchkeith and was damaged. She was on a voyage from Great Yarmouth, Norfolk to Port Dundas, Renfrewshire. Coriander consequently put into Leith, Lothian.
Fadreneslandet	Flag unknown	The ship ran aground and capsized at North Shields, County Durham, United Kingdom.
Fowler	United Kingdom	The ship was driven ashore at Filey, Yorkshire. Her crew were rescued.
Friendship	United Kingdom	The ship was driven ashore and wrecked at Bawdsey, Suffolk. Her crew were rescued by the Harwich Lifeboat. She was on a voyage from Newcastle upon Tyne, Northumberland to Dunkirk, Nord, France.
Grace	United Kingdom	The ship was driven ashore and wrecked at Ilfracombe, Devon. Her crew were rescued.
Mantura	United Kingdom	The ship was wrecked on the Gunfleet Sand, in the North Sea off the coast of Essex. Her crew were rescued by the smack Speedwell (United Kingdom). Mantura was on a voyage from Newcastle upon Tyne, Northumberland to London.
Medway	United Kingdom	The ship was wrecked on the Gunfleet Sand. Her crew were rescued.
Rose	United Kingdom	The ship was driven ashore at Filey. Her crew were rescued.
Science	United Kingdom	The ship was wrecked on the Gunfleet Sand. Her crew were rescued.
Waters	United Kingdom	The ship ran aground between the Cross Sand and Scroby Sands, in the North Sea off the coast of Norfolk. She was later refloated and taken into Great Yarmouth.

== 20 November ==
List of shipwrecks: 20 November 1838
Ship	State	Description
Bridget	United Kingdom	The ship was driven ashore at Portinllaen, Caernarfonshire. She was refloated on 23 November.
New Margaret	United Kingdom	The ship sank at Portdinllaen.
Northumbrian	United Kingdom	The brig was wrecked in the Magdalen Islands, Lower Canada, British North America. Her crew were rescued. She was on a voyage from Miramichi, New Brunswick to Pwllheli, Caernarfonshire.
Oscar	Sweden	The ship was driven ashore and sank in the River Nene at Wisbech, Cambridgeshire, United Kingdom. She was on a voyage from Sundsvall to Wisbech.
Parsee	(United Kingdom of Great Britain and Ireland) New South Wales	The barque was wrecked on the Troubridge Shoals. She was on a voyage from Hobart, Van Diemen's Land to Adelaide, South Australia.
Twee Gebroeders	Netherlands	The ship was wrecked off Ameland, Friesland. Her crew were rescued. She was on a voyage from Rostock to Amsterdam, North Holland.
William and George	United Kingdom	The ship was driven ashore on Achill Island, County Mayo. She was on a voyage from Liverpool, Lancashire to Westport, County Mayo.
Wonder	United Kingdom	The ship was driven ashore and wrecked at Winterton-on-Sea, Norfolk with the loss of all but one of those on board. She was on a voyage from Hamburg to Sunderland, County Durham.

== 21 November ==
List of shipwrecks: 21 November 1838
Ship	State	Description
Active	United Kingdom	The ship was driven ashore and damaged at Ardglass, County Down with the loss of a crew member. She was on a voyage from Liverpool, Lancashire to Belfast, County Antrim.
Ann	United Kingdom	The smack was driven ashore at Calais, France.
Anne	Portugal	The schooner was wrecked on the west coast of China. Her crew were rescued.
Caroline Dorothea	Kingdom of Hanover	The galiot was driven ashore and severely damaged at Calais, France. She was on a voyage from Brake to the Clyde.
Carolus	Hamburg	The ship was driven ashore at Dungeness, Kent, United Kingdom, where she was subsequently wrecked. She was on a voyage from Hamburg to Nantes, Loire-Inférieure, France.
Ellen	United Kingdom	The schooner was driven ashore at Arthurstown, County Wexford.
Emile and Alfred	France	The ship was driven ashore and severely damaged at Gibraltar. She was on a voyage from Puerto Rico to Marseille, Bouches-du-Rhône. Emile and Alfred was refloated on 3 December.
Excel	United Kingdom	The schooner ran aground on the Kimmeridge Ledges, Dorset and was damaged. She was on a voyage from Waterford to London. Excel was refloated on 22 November with assistance from the steamship HMRC Vulcan ( Board of Customs) and towed into Portsmouth, Hampshire.
Frances	United Kingdom	The ship was driven ashore and wrecked at Cardiff, Glamorgan. She was on a voyage from Hull, Yorkshire to Porto, Portugal.
Halcyon	United Kingdom	The ship ran aground at Hull and listed heavily. She was on a voyage from Saint Petersburg, Russia to Hull. Halcyon was later refloated.
Henry	United States	The ship was driven ashore at Gibraltar. She was on a voyage from New Orleans, Louisiana to Marseille. Henry was refloated on 3 December.
Intrepid	United Kingdom	The ship ran aground at Wexford. She was on a voyage from Senegal to Liverpool, Lancashire. She was later refloated and put in to Wexford.
Lord Ebrington	United Kingdom	The ship sprang a leak and was abandoned in the Atlantic Ocean 35 nautical miles (65 km) west of Cape Cornwall. Her crew were rescued by Eagle (United Kingdom).
Louisa	Russia	The ship sank at the mouth of the Pärnu River. She had been refloated by 7 December.
Mary Ann and Arabella	United Kingdom	The ship was driven ashore at Gibraltar. She was on a voyage from London to Cádiz, Spain. Mary Ann and Arabella was refloated on 3 December and resumed her voyage.
Patriot	United Kingdom	The ship was driven ashore at Cardiff. She was refloated the next day.
Rosina	Hamburg	The ship was wrecked on the Goodwin Sands, Kent. Her crew were rescued. She was on a voyage from Hamburg to Jersey, Channel Islands.
San Giovanni	Flag unknown	The ship was driven ashore at Gibraltar whilst bound for Madeira. She was subsequently condemned.
Two Brothers	Netherlands	The ship was wrecked off Ameland, Friesland. She was on a voyage from Rostock to Amsterdam, North Holland.

== 22 November ==
List of shipwrecks: 22 November 1838
Ship	State	Description
Emily	(United Kingdom of Great Britain and Ireland) Grenada	The sloop was wrecked at Grenada.
Emma	United Kingdom	The ship was driven ashore at Harwich, Essex.
Eugenia Africana	Belgium	The ship was wrecked near Portbail, Manche, France. She was on a voyage from Antwerp to Lisbon, Portugal.
Juno	Hamburg	The ship was lost off Terschelling, Friesland, Netherlands. All on board were rescued. She was on a voyage from Hamburg to Havana, Cuba.
Mercur	Prussia	The ship struck the Shipwash Sand, in the North Sea off the coast of Suffolk, United Kingdom and was severely damaged. She was on a voyage from Memel to Gloucester, United Kingdom. Mercur was refloated and put into Harwich, Essex, United Kingdom.
Persian	United Kingdom	The ship caught fire at Havana, Cuba and was scuttled.
Prima Donna	United Kingdom	The ship was driven onto rocks at Plymouth, Devon and was damaged. She was on a voyage from Ancona, Papal States to London. Prima Donna was later refloated and taken into Sutton Pool.
Syren	United Kingdom	The ship departed from Bengal, India for Canton, China. No further trace, presumed foundered with the loss of all hands.
Valiant	United Kingdom	The sloop foundered off Crow Head, County Cork.

== 23 November ==
List of shipwrecks: 23 November 1838
Ship	State	Description
Carl Johan	Stralsund	The ship foundered in the Baltic Sea off Glowe, Prussia. She was on a voyage from Trelleborg to Stockholm, Sweden.
Clio	United Kingdom	The ship was driven ashore on the north coast of Prince Edward Island, British North America. She was on a voyage from Miramichi, New Brunswick, British North America to Liverpool. Clio was consequently condemned.
Dunlop	United Kingdom	The ship was wrecked in Table Bay. All on board were rescued. She was on a voyage from Liverpool, Lancashire to Sydney, New South Wales.
Julie et Juliette	France	The brig was driven ashore and wrecked near Figueira da Foz, Portugal. All on board were rescued. She was on a voyage from Honfleur, Manche to St. Ubes, Portugal.
Mars	Netherlands	The sloop was driven ashore and wrecked near Cape Espichel, Portugal with the loss of all hands. She was on a voyage from Amsterdam, North Holland to Lisbon, Portugal.
Phœnix	United Kingdom	The ship was sighted in the Øresund whilst on a voyage from Danzig to Liverpool. No further trace, presumed foundered with the loss of all hands.
Sappho	United Kingdom	The schooner was wrecked near Figueira da Foz. Her crew were rescued. She was on a voyage from Plymouth, Devon to Seville, Spain.

== 24 November ==
List of shipwrecks: 24 November 1838
Ship	State	Description
Active	United Kingdom	The ship was driven ashore at Ardglass, County Down with the loss of a crew member. She was on a voyage from Liverpool, Lancashire to Belfast, County Antrim.
Experiment	United Kingdom	The ship was driven ashore on Sancti Petri, Spain. Her crew were rescued. She was on a voyage from Liverpool to Messina, Sicily. She was refloated on 15 May 1839.
Providence	United Kingdom	The ship was driven ashore and wrecked at Milford Haven, Pembrokeshire with the loss of all five of her crew. She was on a voyage from Ipswich, Suffolk to Liverpool.
Providence Good Intent	United Kingdom	The ship departed from Royan, Morbihan, France for Hull, Yorkshire. No further trace, presumed foundered with the loss of all hands.
Reliance	United Kingdom	The brig ran aground and foundered off Brancaster, Norfolk with the loss of eight of her eleven crew. Survivors were rescued by HMRC Hind ( Board of Customs). Reliance was on a voyage from Narva, Russia to Hull, Yorkshire.

== 25 November ==
List of shipwrecks: 25 November 1838
Ship	State	Description
Ariadne	United Kingdom	The ship struck the Tuskar Rock and capsized with the loss of three of her fourteen crew. She was righted and was subsequently driven ashore at Wexford with the loss of three more crew. Ariadne was on a voyage from Quebec City, Lower Canada, British North America to Belfast, County Antrim.
Ellen	United Kingdom	The ship was wrecked at Sainte-Rose, Guadeloupe. Her crew were rescued. She was on a voyage from Great Yarmouth, Norfolk to Saint Vincent, Virgin Islands.
George	United Kingdom	The ship was driven ashore at Kilrush, County Clare. She was refloated the next day.
Isabella	United Kingdom	The ship sank off Passage West, County Cork. She was on a voyage from Pernambuco, Brazil to Liverpool, Lancashire. Isabella was refloated on 21 January and beached in shallow water.
Liberty	United Kingdom	The ship was wrecked at Plymouth, Devon. Her crew were rescued.
Vigilant	United Kingdom	The ship was in collision with Teesdale (United Kingdom) and foundered in the North Sea off the coast of Suffolk with the loss of two of her crew. Teesdale, which was on a voyage from Saint Petersburg, Russia to London, was severely damaged and put into Harwich, Essex.
Waterwitch	United Kingdom	The brigantine was driven ashore and wrecked near Nethertown, County Wexford. Her crew were rescued. She was on a voyage from Glasgow, Renfrewshire to Livorno, Grand Duchy of Tuscany.
William and George	United Kingdom	The brig was wrecked at Kiel, Prussia.

== 26 November ==
List of shipwrecks: 26 November 1838
Ship	State	Description
Alexander Stewart	United Kingdom	The brig was driven ashore at Monkstown, County Cork.
Catherine	Hamburg	The ship ran aground on the Stony Binks, in the North Sea off the coast of County Durham, United Kingdom. She was on a voyage from Altona to King's Lynn, Norfolk, United Kingdom. Catherine was refloated and put into Hull, Yorkshire, United Kingdom.
Clementson	United Kingdom	The barque was driven ashore and wrecked at Ballycotton, County Cork. Her crew were rescued. She was on a voyage from Puerto Cabello, Venezuela to Liverpool, Lancashire.
Commerce	United Kingdom	The ship was driven ashore at Plymouth, Devon.
Isabella	United Kingdom	The barque was driven ashore in Duncannon Bay, County Wexford. She was on a voyage from Pernambuco, Brazil to Liverpool.
Industry	United Kingdom	The ship was in collision with the sloop Pilot (United Kingdom) and foundered. Her crew were rescued. Pilot was abandoned by her crew; she was subsequently towed into Milford Haven Pembrokeshire.
Magnet	United Kingdom	The schooner was driven ashore at Portrane, County Dublin. Her crew were rescued. She was on a voyage from Cork to Newport, Monmouthshire.
Scotia	United States	The schooner was driven ashore at Cobh.
St. Nicoli	Russia	The ship ran aground on the Shipwash Sand, in the North Sea off the coast of Suffolk, United Kingdom. She was on a voyage from Saint Petersburg to Málaga, Spain.
William and George	United Kingdom	The ship was driven ashore on the coast of Erris, County Mayo with the loss of two of her crew. She was on a voyage from Liverpool to Waterford.

== 27 November ==
List of shipwrecks: 27 November 1838
Ship	State	Description
Agnes	United Kingdom	The ship was driven ashore at Beaumaris, Anglesey. She was on a voyage from Bangor, Caernarfonshire to Dumfries.
Amelia	United Kingdom	The ship ran aground and sank at Pensacola, Florida Territory. She was on a voyage from Natchez to Liverpool, Lancashire.
Ann Alicia	United Kingdom	The ship was driven ashore at Beaumaris, Anglesey. She was on a voyage from London to Liverpool, Lancashire. Ann Alicia was refloated the next day.
Bellisima	United Kingdom	The ship was wrecked near Looe, Cornwall. Her crew were rescued. She was on a voyage from Odesa to Newfoundland, British North America.
Brilliant	United Kingdom	The ship was driven ashore and wrecked at Kirksanto Head Isle of Man with the loss of four of her eight crew. She was on a voyage from Liverpool to Bordeaux, Gironde, France.
Concordia	United Kingdom	The ship was driven ashore at Torre Abbey, Devon. She was on a voyage from Villa Nova to London. Concordia was refloated on 18 December and taken into Torquay, Devon.
Courrier de Havre	France	The ship was wrecked near Camaret-sur-Mer, Finistère. Her crew were rescued. She was on a voyage from Jersey, Channel Islands to Bordeaux, Gironde.
Emblem	United Kingdom	The ship ran aground off Redcar, Yorkshire. She was later refloated and put into Middlesbrough, Yorkshire for repairs.
Gainsborough	United Kingdom	The ship was driven ashore at Malahide, County Dublin. with the loss of three of her crew. She was on a voyage from Liverpool to London.
George	United Kingdom	The ship was driven ashore at Clea Ness, Lincolnshire. She was on a voyage from King's Lynn, Norfolk to Wakefield, Yorkshire. George was refloated and taken into Grimsby, Lincolnshire.
Hunter	United Kingdom	The sloop was wrecked at Peterhead, Aberdeenshire. Her crew were rescued by rocket apparatus. She was on a voyage from Sunderland, County Durham to Peterhead.
Lady Alexandria	United Kingdom	The ship was driven ashore near Falmouth, Cornwall. Her crew were rescued. She was on a voyage from London to Drogheda, County Louth.
La Rose	France	The schooner was wrecked at Cobh, County Cork.
Liberia	United Kingdom	The ship was driven ashore at Redcar, Yorkshire. She was later refloated and towed into the River Tees.
Lively	United Kingdom	The ship was beached at Campbeltown, Argyllshire, where she sank. she was on a voyage from Glasgow, Renfrewshire to Rouen, Seine-Inférieure, France.
Margaret	United Kingdom	The ship was driven ashore at Malahide. She was on a voyage from Preston, Lancashire to Wicklow.
Maria and Betty	United Kingdom	The ship was sighted in the Øresund whilst on a voyage from Riga, Russian Empire to Amsterdam, North Holland, Netherlands. No further trace, presumed foundered with the loss of all hands.
Mary	United Kingdom	The ship was driven ashore and wrecked near Clonakilty, County Cork. Her seventeen crew were rescued. She was on a voyage from Maranhão, Brazil to Liverpool.
Navarino	United Kingdom	The ship was driven ashore and wrecked at South Shields, County Durham. Her crew were rescued. She was on a voyage from King's Lynn to Blyth, Northumberland. Navarino was refloated on 30 November.
Nouvelle Destin	France	The brig was driven ashore and wrecked at Five Mile Point, County Wicklow. Her six crew were rescued, but three rescuers died when their skiff capsized. She was on a voyage from Lugon, Nantes, Loire-Inférieure to Douglas, Isle of Man.
Paquebot de Cayenne	France	The ship was wrecked in the Isles of Scilly, United Kingdom. All on board were rescued. She was on a voyage from Rio de Janeiro, Brazil to Havre de Grâce, Seine-Inférieure.
Pearl	United Kingdom	The ship was in collision with a brig and was beached at Plymouth, Devon. She was on a voyage from Naples, Kingdom of the Two Sicilies to India.
Ramier la Ville	France	The ship was wrecked near Falmouth.
Robert and Betsey	United Kingdom	The ship was driven ashore at Sunderland, County Durham.
Reciprocity	United Kingdom	The ship was wrecked at Peterhead. Her crew were rescued. She was on a voyage from Sunderland to Peterhead.
Seelust	Bremen	The ship ran aground off Wremen, Kingdom of Hanover. She was on a voyage from Rigato Bremen.
Siberia	United Kingdom	The ship was driven ashore at Redcar, Yorkshire. She was later refloated and towed into the River Tees.
Sisters	United Kingdom	The ship was driven ashore and wrecked at Rhosilli, Glamorgan. Her crew survived. She was on a voyage from Hayle, Cornwall to Swansea.
Swift	United Kingdom	The ship was driven ashore at Clea Ness. She was on a voyage from Hamburg to Plymouth, Devon. Swift was refloated the next day and take into Grimsby.
Thomas and Sarah	United Kingdom	The ship was driven ashore at Swansea. Her crew were rescued. She was on a voyage from Newport, Monmouthshire to Swansea.
Union	United Kingdom	The schooner was driven ashore and wrecked at Great Yarmouth, Norfolk. Her crew were rescued. She was on a voyage from Newcastle upon Tyne, Northumberland to Barcelona, Spain.
Unity	United Kingdom	The brig was driven into the pier at Sunderland and consequently sank.

== 28 November ==
List of shipwrecks: 28 November 1838
Ship	State	Description
Alexander	United Kingdom	The ship was driven ashore and wrecked near Stackpole, Pembrokeshire with the loss of all hands. She was on a voyage from Llanelly, Glamorgan to London.
Barbara	United Kingdom	The brig was wrecked in Bigbury Bay with the loss of eight of her eleven crew. She was on a voyage from Kerch, Russia to Falmouth, Cornwall.
Bellona	United Kingdom	The ship was driven ashore at "Ballyurge", Ireland. Her crew were rescued. She was on a voyage from Quebec City, Lower Canada, British North America to Strangford, County Antrim.
Bootle	United Kingdom	The ship ran aground on the Kish Bank, in Liverpool Bay. She was on a voyage from Liverpool, Lancashire to Trinidad. Bootle was later refloated and towed into Liverpool by the pilot boat Hawk (United Kingdom).
Brown	United Kingdom	The ship was driven ashore at Penzance, Cornwall. Her crew were rescued. She was refloated on 13 December and taken into Penzance.
Camilla	United Kingdom	The barque was driven ashore and wrecked at Ballinacourty, County Waterford. Her fifteen crew were rescued by the Coast Guard. She was on a voyage from Singapore to Liverpool.
Camille	France	The ship was scuttled at Penzance. She was on a voyage from Adra, Spain to Dunkerque, Nord.
Catherine and Mary	United Kingdom	The ship was blown out to sea from Porthdinllaen, Caernarfonshire without anyone on board. She subsequently came ashore on Anglesey.
Ceres	United Kingdom	The ship was driven ashore at Beaumaris, Anglesey. She was on a voyage from Flint to Arklow, County Wicklow.
Chieftain	United Kingdom	The ship ran aground on the Church Rocks, off the Orkney Islands. She was on a voyage from Danzig to Liverpool, Lancashire. Chieftain was refloated the next day and taken into Stromness, Orkney Islands.
Columbine	United Kingdom	The schooner was driven ashore and wrecked west of Wyke, Dorset with the loss of all eighteen people on board.
Comallo	United Kingdom	The ship was wrecked at Corrignaman, County Antrim. Her fourteen crew were rescued. She was on a voyage from Singapore to Liverpool.
Commerce	United Kingdom	The schooner was wrecked at Plymouth Hoe, Devon. Her crew were rescued.
Delia	United Kingdom	The ship was driven ashore in the Orkney Islands. Her crew were rescued. She was on a voyage from Newcastle upon Tyne, Northumberland to Rio de Janeiro, Brazil.
Dolphin	United Kingdom	The ship was driven ashore at Tenby, Pembrokeshire and was abandoned by her crew. She was later taken into Tenby.
Dove	United Kingdom	The ship was driven ashore at Cork and was abandoned by her crew. She was on a voyage from Waterford to Clonakilty, County Cork. Dove was later refloated.
Dove	United Kingdom	The sloop was abandoned in West Bay, Dorset. She subsequently came ashore at Chesil Beach, Dorset and was wrecked.
Druide	France	The ship was driven ashore and wrecked at Conil de la Frontera, Spain with the loss of a crew member. she was on a voyage from Newcastle upon Tyne to Marseille, Bouches-du-Rhône.
Durham	United Kingdom	The ship was driven ashore in Saundersfoot Bay. She was on a voyage from Swansea, Glamorgan to King's Lynn, Norfolk. She was refloated on 11 February 1839.
Egeria or Egina	United Kingdom	The ship was wrecked at Howth, County Dublin. All 22 people on board were rescued. She was on a voyage from Ulverstone, Lancashire to Newport, Monmouthshire. The ship was refloated on 3 December and taken into Dublin.
Eliza	United Kingdom	The ship was scuttled at Penzance.
Eliza and Nancy	United Kingdom	The ship was driven ashore at Polworth Point, Cornwall. She was later refloated.
Elizabeth	United Kingdom	The ship was driven ashore at Workington, Cumberland. She was on a voyage from Liverpool to Carlisle, Cumberland. Elizabeth was later refloated.
Elizabeth	United Kingdom	The ship was driven ashore at Par, Cornwall. She was on a voyage from Falmouth, Cornwall to Plymouth, Devon.
Emerald	United Kingdom	The ship was driven ashore at Barbers's Point, Ottoman Empire. She was on a voyage from Newcastle upon Tyne to Constantinople, Ottoman Empire. Emerald was refloated on 6 December.
Esther	United Kingdom	The ship was abandoned in the Atlantic Ocean with the loss of eight of the sixteen people on board. Survivors were rescued by Eliza Ann (France). Esther was on a voyage from Quebec City to Southampton, Hampshire.
Fanny	United Kingdom	The ship was driven ashore at Beaumaris. She was on a voyage from Liverpool to Newry, County Antrim.
Frances	United Kingdom	The ship was wrecked on Little Saltee, County Wexford with the loss of four of her crew. She was on a voyage from Limerick to Liverpool.
Francis	United Kingdom	The ship was driven ashore and damaged at Cardiff, Glamorgan. She was on a voyage from Cardiff to Porto, Portugal. Francis was refloated on 30 November and taken into Cardiff for repairs.
Hebble	United Kingdom	The ship ran aground on the Gunfleet Sand, in the North Sea off the coast of Essex. She was on a voyage from Sheerness, Kent to Stockton-on-Tees, County Durham. Hebble was refloated and put into Harwich, Essex.
Herman Julius	Denmark	The ship was driven ashore at Highcliff, Hampshire with the loss of a crew member. She was on a voyage from Lisbon, Portugal to Helsingør. Herman Julius broke up on 3 December.
Hope	United Kingdom	The ship was wrecked near Marazion, Cornwall. She was on a voyage from a Welsh port to Exeter, Devon.
Hope	United Kingdom	The ship was driven ashore at Tenby. She was later refloated.
Jane	United Kingdom	The ship was driven ashore and wrecked at Looe, Cornwall. Her crew were rescued. She was on a voyage from Tarragona, Spain to Plymouth, Devon.
Joe	United Kingdom	The ship was scuttled at Penzance.
John	United Kingdom	The ship was driven ashore at Tenby. She was later refloated.
Joseph Désirée	France	The ship was wrecked in Kimmeridge Bay. Her crew were rescued by the Coast Guard. She was on a voyage from Bordeaux, Gironde to Rouen, Seine-Inférieure.
Julie	Belgium	The ship was wrecked at Douglas, Isle of Man with the loss of all hands, at least nine people.
Leocadie	France	The chasse-marée was wrecked on Bananec, Glénan Islands, Finistère. Eight of her crew were rescued. She was on a voyage from Rouen, Seine-Inférieure to Nantes, Loire-Inférieure.
Le Speculateur	France	The ship was driven ashore and wrecked at Tramore, County Waterford.
Louisa	Hamburg	The ship was driven ashore at Weymouth. Her crew were rescued. She was on a voyage from Hamburg to Saint-Brieuc, Côtes-du-Nord, France.
Louise Marie	France	The ship was driven ashore at Weymouth. Her crew were rescued. She was on a voyage from Cherbourg, Seine-Inférieure to Granville, Manche.
Margaret	United Kingdom	The schooner capsized at Sligo and was severely damaged.
Marie Hortense	United Kingdom	The ship was scuttled at Penzance. She was later refloated.
Mary	(United Kingdom of Great Britain and Ireland) British North America	The brig was driven ashore in Whiting Bay, County Cork with the loss of two of her fifteen crew and the ship's Newfoundland dog. She was on a voyage from Saint John, New Brunswick to Liverpool. Mary broke up on 1 December.
Mayflower	United Kingdom	The ship was driven ashore in Cairn Bay, Wigtownshire. She was refloated on 5 December.
Robert Noble	United Kingdom	The schooner was driven ashore at "Kilman", County Wexford. She was on a voyage from Cork to Newport, Monmouthshire.
Sarah Ann	United Kingdom	The ship was driven ashore at Tenby and was scuttled. Her crew were rescued. She was on a voyage from Hayle, Cornwall to Llanelly, Glamorgan.
Scotia	United Kingdom	The ship was driven ashore at Cork.
Shepherdess	United Kingdom	The schooner was driven ashore at Kingstown, County Dublin.
Swaine	United Kingdom	The ship was driven ashore at Mahon, County Cork. Her crew were rescued. She was on a voyage from Cork to Newport, Monmouthshire.
Thomas	United Kingdom	The ship foundered in the North Sea. Her five crew survived. She was on a voyage from Gothenburg, Sweden to London.
William	United Kingdom	The ship was scuttled at Penzance.

== 29 November ==
List of shipwrecks: 29 November 1838
Ship	State	Description
Amiable Jenny	France	The ship was driven ashore at Audierne, Finistère with the loss of twelve of her crew. She was on a voyage from Saint Domingo to Nantes, Loire-Inférieure.
Arethusa	United Kingdom	The ship was lost in the English Channel off Fleet, Dorset with the loss of all hands. She was on a voyage from London to Antigua.
Belina	United Kingdom	The ship was wrecked on the Balliteg Burrow with the loss of a crew member. She was on a voyage from Quebec City, Lower Canada, British North America to Strangford, County Antrim.
Britannia	United Kingdom	The ship was wrecked near Weymouth, Dorset either with the loss of all hands. or her crew being rescued.
British Heroine	United Kingdom	The ship was driven ashore in Dundrum Bay. She was on a voyage from Liverpool, Lancashire to Mobile, Alabama, United States. She was refloated on 18 March 1839 and taken into Warrenpoint, County Antrim.
Catherine and Isabella	United Kingdom	The schooner was driven ashore at Quigley's Point, County Donegal. She was on a voyage from Londonderry to Glasgow, Renfrewshire. Catherine Isabella was refloated on 5 December and resumed her voyage.
Clare	France	The ship was wrecked in Compton Bay. Her crew were rescued. She was on a voyage from Marseille, Bouches-du-Rhône to Honfleur, Calvados.
Comala	United Kingdom	The ship was wrecked off Dungarvan, County Waterford. All eleven crew and three pilots on board were rescued. She was on a voyage from Singapore to Liverpool.
Concordia	United Kingdom	The ship was driven ashore at Torre Abbey, Devon. She was on a voyage from Villanova to London. Concordia was refloated on 18 December and taken into Torquay.
Eliza	United Kingdom	The ship was driven ashore south of Helsingør, Denmark She was on a voyage from Ria, Russia to Belfast, County Antrim. Eliza was refloated the next day and put into Helsingør.
Etonnante	France	The ship ran aground on the Scroby Sands, Norfolk, United Kingdom and was damaged. She was consequently beached. Etonnante was on a voyage from Boulogne-sur-Mer, Pas-de-Calais to Newcastle upon Tyne, Northumberland, United Kingdom.
Everton	United Kingdom	The brig foundered in the Bay of Biscay. Her twelve crew were rescued by Emma (France). Everton was on a voyage from Newcastle upon Tyne to Constantinople, Ottoman Empire.
Felix	France	The schooner was driven ashore and wrecked at Plozévet, Finistère. She was on a voyage from Bordeaux, Gironde to Senegal.
Fréderic	France	The ship was driven ashore and wrecked at Llanelly, Glamorgan, United Kingdom. Her crew were rescued. She was on a voyage from Rouen, Seine-Inférieure to Cardiff, Glamorgan.
Gouvernor de Graaf de Baillet	Belgium	The ship was driven ashore in Bigbury Bay in a capsized state. She was on a voyage from Ostend, West Flanders to Batatvia, Netherlands East Indies.
Grecian	United Kingdom	The ship was driven ashore at Kilrush, County Clare. She was on a voyage from Quebec City to Liverpool.
Jane	United Kingdom	The ship foundered off Beaumaris, Anglesey. Her crew were rescued. She was on a voyage from Flint to Amlwch, Anglesey.
Jaubert	France	The ship was wrecked near Bridport, Dorset, United Kingdom with the loss of three of her eight crew. She was on a voyage from Algiers, Algeria to Hamburg.
Jeune Achille	France	The sloop was driven ashore and damaged at Swansea, Glamorgan. She was later refloated.
John	United Kingdom	The ship was driven ashore at Trefusco Point, Cornwall. She was later refloated.
John Taylor	United States	The ship was destroyed by fire at Mobile, Alabama. She was on a voyage from New York to Liverpool.
L'Euphrasie	Belgium	The brig was wrecked in Bigbury Bay with the loss of all hands.
Louise	Sweden	The barque was driven ashore at Chesil Beach. Her crew survived. She was on a voyage from Gävle to St. Ubes, Portugal.
Martin de Sarazen	France	The chasse-marée was driven ashore and wrecked between Newhaven and Rottingdean, Sussex, United Kingdom with the loss of all hands, between fifteen and twenty people.
Mary Ann	United Kingdom	The schooner was driven ashore and wrecked at Abbotsbury, Dorset with the loss of five of her six crew. She was on a voyage from Ipswich, Suffolk to Glasgow, Renfrewshire.
Palermo Packet	United Kingdom	The ship was driven ashore at Hayling Island, Hampshire. She was on a voyage from the Rio Grande to Antwerp, Belgium. Palermo Packet was refloated on 15 December.
Panope	United Kingdom	The brig was wrecked on the Gunfleet Sand, in the North Sea off the coast of Essex. Her crew were rescued. She was on a voyage from London to Grangemouth, Stirlingshire.
Pyrenees	United Kingdom	The ship was driven ashore at Kinsale, County Cork. She was on a voyage from Quebec City to Gloucester. Pyrenees was refloated on 15 December.
Sandwich	United Kingdom	The collier, a brig, was lost off Langton Matravers, Dorset with the loss of all hands.
Susan	United Kingdom	The barque was driven ashore at Bonmahon, County Waterford. Her crew were rescued. She was on a voyage from Cork to Newport, Monmouthshire.
Ward	United Kingdom	The ship was abandoned in the Atlantic Ocean with the loss of a crew member. Survivors were rescued by Prince George (United Kingdom).

== 30 November ==
List of shipwrecks: 30 November 1838
Ship	State	Description
Admiral Pleuville	Belgium	The ship ran aground on the Barrow Sand, in the North Sea off the coast of Suffolk, United Kingdom. She was on a voyage from Ostend, West Flanders to Martinique. Admiral Pleuville was refloated and put into Harwich, Essex, United Kingdom.
Earl of Murray	United Kingdom	The ship foundered in the Atlantic Ocean with the loss of all hands, at least eight people.
Busy	United Kingdom	The ship struck the pier at Sunderland, County Durham and sank.
Lucullus	France	The ship was wrecked on Point Chef Moulin. All on board were rescued. She was on a voyage from Île Bourbon to Bordeaux, Gironde.
Maria	Sweden	The ship was wrecked on Anholt, Denmark. Her crew were rescued. She was on a voyage from Stockholm to Chatham, Kent, United Kingdom.
Mary Elliott	United Kingdom	The schooner was driven ashore at Towning Capel, Cardiganshire with the loss of a crew member. She was on a voyage from Cork to Newhaven, Sussex.
Mellina Jantina	Netherlands	The ship was driven ashore and severely damaged at Étaples, Pas-de-Calais, France. Her crew were rescued. She was on a voyage from Liverpool, Lancashire, United Kingdom to Rotterdam, South Holland. Mellina Jantina was refloated on 5 February 1839 and taken into Boulogne, Pas-de-Calais.
Nomen	Denmark	The brig was abandoned in the English Channel off the coast of Dorset, United Kingdom with the loss of two of her crew. She was on a voyage from Copenhagen to Málaga, Spain. She was subsequently taken into Poole, Dorset, United Kingdom on 4 December.
Oscar	United States	The ship was wrecked at Honolulu, Sandwich Islands.
Star	United Kingdom	The schooner was driven ashore and wrecked at Rhoscolyn, Anglesey. Her crew were rescued. She was on a voyage from Dénia, Spain to Liverpool. Star was refloated on 3 January 1839 and taken into Holyhead, Anglesey.
St. Patrick	United Kingdom	The steamship was wrecked near the Hook Lighthouse, County Wexford with the loss of three of her crew and three passengers. Twenty-one people were rescued.

== Unknown date ==
List of shipwrecks: Unknown date in November 1838
Ship	State	Description
Albion	United Kingdom	The ship was wrecked near Whitehaven, Cumberland with the loss of three of her six crew. She was on a voyage from Málaga, Spain to Liverpool, Lancashire.
Ann	United Kingdom	The ship foundered in the North Sea off Bridlington, Yorkshire in late November.
Black Prince	United Kingdom	The ship ran aground at Santos, Brazil.
Carlotta	Brazil	The ship was lost near "Aricati". She was on a voyage from Pernambuco to "Aricati".
Clara	United Kingdom	The ship foundered in the Irish Sea before 16 November. she was on a voyage from Newport, Monmouthshire to Cork.
Colosse	France	The ship was wrecked at Millbay, Devon, United Kingdom with the loss of one of her seven crew. She was on a voyage from Dunkerque, Nord to Bordeaux, Gironde.
Constitutionen	Norway	The ship foundered off "Borgo" with the loss of three of her crew. She was on a voyage from Stavanger to Saint Petersburg, Russia.
Corsair	United Kingdom	The brig was abandoned in the Atlantic Ocean on or before 22 November. She was on a voyage from Quebec City, Lower Canada, British North America to the Clyde.
Cumanche	United States	The steamboat sank in the Mississippi River downstream of its junction with the Salt River.
Defence	United Kingdom	The ship struck a sunken wreck off Hiiumaa, Russia, capsized and sank. Her crew were rescued. She was on a voyage from Saint Petersburg to London.
Diana	United Kingdom	The ship was wrecked on the Gunfleet Sand, in the North Sea off the coast of Essex. Her crew were rescued.
Dido	Hamburg	The ship was driven ashore on Amrum, Duchy of Schleswig. She was on a voyage from Sunderland, County Durham, United Kingdom to Hamburg.
Dorothea	United Kingdom	The ship was driven ashore whilst on a voyage from Rotterdam, South Holland, Netherlands to Montevideo, Uruguay. She was later refloated and put into Cowes, Isle of Wight.
Dove	(United Kingdom of Great Britain and Ireland) British North America	The ship was lost near St. Peter's, Nova Scotia. She was on a voyage from Newfoundland to Miramichi, New Brunswick.
Estelle	France	The ship was wrecked on Wangeroog, Kingdom of Hanover. Her crew were rescued. She was on a voyage from Saint-Valery-sur-Somme to Sunderland.
Flora	United Kingdom	The ship foundered in the North Sea off Lowestoft, Suffolk.
General Brown	United States	The steamboat was wrecked at St. Helena, Louisiana with the loss of 33 lives due to a boiler explosion.
Gertrude	United Kingdom	The ship foundered 7 versts (4.03 nautical miles (7.47 km)) south of Kronstadt. She was on a voyage from Saint Petersburg to London. Gertrude was later refloated. She was taken into Kronstadt on 13 May 1839.
Griffin	United Kingdom	The ship was driven ashore at Waterford. She was on a voyage from Ipswich, Suffolk to Liverpool.
Hercules	Stettin	The ship ran aground off Anholt, Denmark. She was on a voyage from Rotterdam to Stettin. Hercules was later refloated.
Iris	United Kingdom	The ship sprang a leak and was beached at Dartmouth, Devon. She was on a voyage from Belfast, County Antrim to London.
Jeune Alexandre	France	The ship was driven ashore at Guernsey, Channel Islands. She was on a voyage from Saint-Malo, Ille-et-Vilaine to Dunkerque, Nord. Jeune Alexandre was later refloated and taken into Guernsey.
Jeune Caroline	Belgium	The ship was driven ashore near Grimsby, Lincolnshire, United Kingdom. She was on a voyage from Hull, Yorkshire to Antwerp.
Lady Day	United Kingdom	The ship foundered in the English Channel off Dungeness, Kent on or before 15 November. She was on a voyage from Hellevoetsluis, Zeeland, Netherlands to Newport, Monmouthshire.
La Nouvelle Confiance en Dieu	France	The ship was wrecked near Aber Wrac'h, Finistère.
Lark	United Kingdom	The ship was driven ashore in Carnarvon Bay with the loss of two of her crew.
Le Jean Bart	France	The smack was driven ashore and wrecked at Burton Bradstock, Dorset between 28 and 30 November with the loss of four of her nine crew.
Margina Margaretha	Netherlands	The ship ran aground in the Friesland Channel. She was on a voyage from Newcastle upon Tyne to Groningen Margina Margaretha consequently put into "Zoltcamp".
Maria	United Kingdom	The ship sprang a leak and foundered in The Sleeve, off the coast of Norway on or before 6 November. Her crew were rescued. She was on a voyage from London to Danzig.
Mercator	Stettin	The ship was wrecked off "Warberg". Her crew were rescued. She was on a voyage from Stettin to Bordeaux, Gironde, France.
Mercure	Prussia	The barque was driven ashore on the coast of Essex.
Nordstjernen	Norway	The galiot was abandoned in the North Sea 30 nautical miles (56 km) off Domesnes on or before 8 November. She was on a voyage from Fredrikstad to a French port. Nordstjernen was towed into Mandal on 3 November.
Onark	United States	The steamship was driven ashore on Cumberland Island, Georgia.
Paragon	United Kingdom	The ship was driven ashore near Greenock, Renfrewshire. She was on a voyage from Arkhangelsk, Russia to Greenock. Paragon was refloated on 10 November.
Paulina	United States	The ship was abandoned in the Atlantic Ocean before 8 November.
Peslevon	Russia	The ship was wrecked in the Black Sea. All 53 people on board were subsequently rescued. She was on a voyage from Odesa to Galatz, Ottoman Empire.
Pillhead	Flag unknown	The ship foundered off Gothenburg, Sweden with the loss of a crew member. She was on a voyage from Hamburg to Rostock.
Princess Royal	United Kingdom	The ship departed from Quebec City for Hull in mid-November. No further trace, presumed foundered with the loss of all hands.
Providence	United Kingdom	The ship foundered in the Irish Sea off the coast of Pembrokeshire.
Providence	United Kingdom	The ship was driven ashore at Milford Haven, Pembrokeshire. She was refloated on 30 November.
Ramaire	France	The lugger was wrecked in Gerrans Bay with the loss of three of her crew. She was on a voyage from Bordeaux to Plymouth.
Ratio	Kingdom of the Two Sicilies	The brig ran aground on the Gabbard Sand, in the North Sea and was damaged. She was refloated and taken into The Downs. Ratio was on a voyage from South Shields, County Durham, United Kingdom t Naples.
Regina	Sweden	The ship was driven ashore on the Swedish coast. She was on a voyage from Gothenburg to the East Indies. Regina was later refloated and put back to Gothenburg in a severely damaged condition.
Resolution	Prussia	The ship was capsized in the Baltic Sea. She was on a voyage from Memel to Bridlington, Yorkshire, United Kingdom. Resolution was later taken into Danzig in a capsized state.
Revel	United Kingdom	The ship foundered in the English Channel off the coast of Devon in late November.
Silkworm	United Kingdom	The ship was driven ashore at Shippagan, New Brunswick. She was on a voyage from Sunderland to Quebec City.
Stephenson	United Kingdom	The ship was driven ashore and wrecked near Marazion, Cornwall. Her crew were rescued. She was on a voyage from a Welsh port to Plymouth, Devon.
St. Nicholas	Russia	The ship was wrecked on the coast of the Crimean Peninsula with the loss of all on board. She was on a voyage from Odesa to a Spanish port.
Susan	United Kingdom	The ship was driven ashore at Plymouth.
Union	United Kingdom	The ship was driven ashore and wrecked at Great Yarmouth, Norfolk. Her crew were rescued. She was on a voyage from Newcastle upon Tyne to Barcelona, Spain.
William Hamley	United Kingdom	The ship was driven ashore near Cowes. She was on a voyage from Newcastle upon Tyne to Guernsey, Channel Islands. William Hamley was refloated on 16 November.
