= Hen Cliff =

Cliff on the Isle of Purbeck, Dorset, England

Coordinates: 50.6059°N 2.1290°W

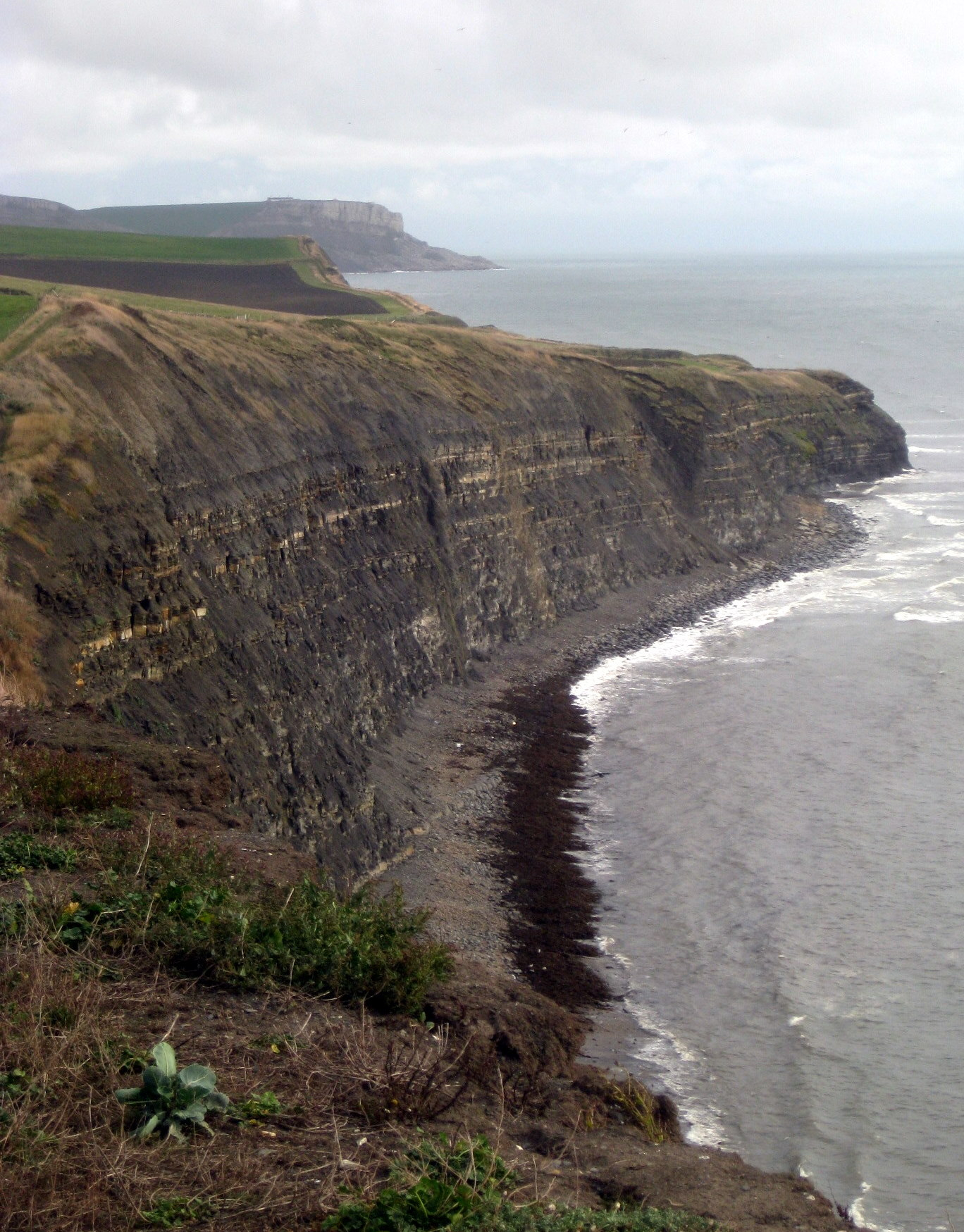
Hen Cliff

Hen Cliff is part of the Jurassic Coast near Kimmeridge in the Isle of Purbeck, Dorset, England.

The cliff runs from the eastern end of Kimmeridge Bay (below the folly called Clavell Tower) east to an area called Cuddle. The cliffs consist (as at Kimmeridge Bay) of ledges of dolomite interspersed with thicker units of shale. The steepness of the cliff is unexpectedly pronounced, nearly perpendicular, and presumably attributed to the swift erosion caused by the sea and the shallow angle of inclination. Rockfalls are common and dangerous here. To the southeast are the Kimmeridge Ledges.
