= Kimmeridge Ledges =

Clay ledges in Dorset, England

Coordinates: 50.603431°N 2.124007°W

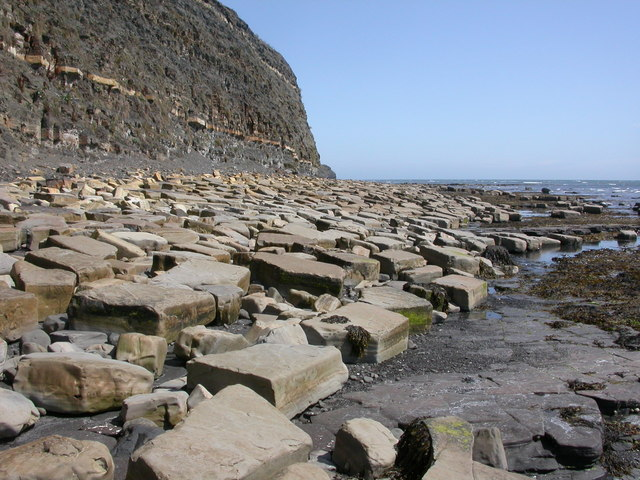
- Kimmeridge Ledges, looking east

- Location within Dorset
- OS grid reference: SY915781
- Civil parish: Kimmeridge
- Unitary authority: Dorset
- Ceremonial county: Dorset
- Region: South West
- Country: England
- Sovereign state: United Kingdom
- Post town: WAREHAM
- Postcode district: BH20
- Police: Dorset
- Fire: Dorset and Wiltshire
- Ambulance: South Western
- UK Parliament: South Dorset

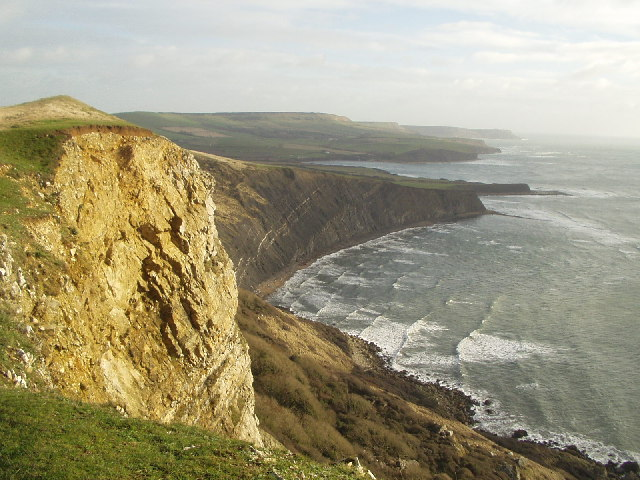
View from the clifftop

Kimmeridge Ledges ( /ˈkɪmərɪdʒ/) is a set of Kimmeridge clay ledges stretching out in to the sea on the Isle of Purbeck, a peninsula on the English Channel coast in Dorset, England.They are located to the southeast of Kimmeridge Bay and south of the villages of Kimmeridge, on the Smedmore Estate.

== Overview ==
The area is renowned for its fossils, with The Etches Collection in the village of Kimmeridge displaying fossils found locally by Steve Etches over a 30-year period, especially on the Kimmeridge Ledges when exposed at low tide.

The Kimmeridge Ledges form part of the Jurassic Coast, a World Heritage Site, and the Dorset National Landscape. The coast is also part of a Site of Special Scientific Interest, protected for its a rich sea life. Kimmeridge is the type locality for Kimmeridge clay, the geological formation that covers most of the area. Within the clay are bands of bituminous shale.

St Alban's Head can be viewed to the southeast. Forming the cliffs above the Kimmeridge Ledges are (west to east) Hen Cliff, Cuddle, Clavell's Hard, and Rope Lake Head. To the north is Smedmore House and to the northeast is imposing hill Swyre Head.

== Geology ==
The geology of the area around Kimmeridge Ledges is important as part of the Jurassic Coast World Heritage Site. It comprises bedrock formed in the Late Jurassic epoch, overlain in many places by superficial Quaternary head deposits.

Kimmeridge gives its name to the Kimmeridgian, the division of the Jurassic period in which the beds were laid down, because of the quality of the cliffs and the fossils they yield. Kimmeridge is also the type locality for the Jurassic age Kimmeridge Clay formation, which is well represented in southern England, and provides one of the source rocks for hydrocarbons found in the Wessex and North Sea Basins.

== See also ==
- The Etches Collection
- List of Dorset beaches
- Geology of Dorset
