= Clavell Tower =

Folly in Kimmeridge, Dorset, England

Coordinates: 50°36′25″N 2°7′48″W

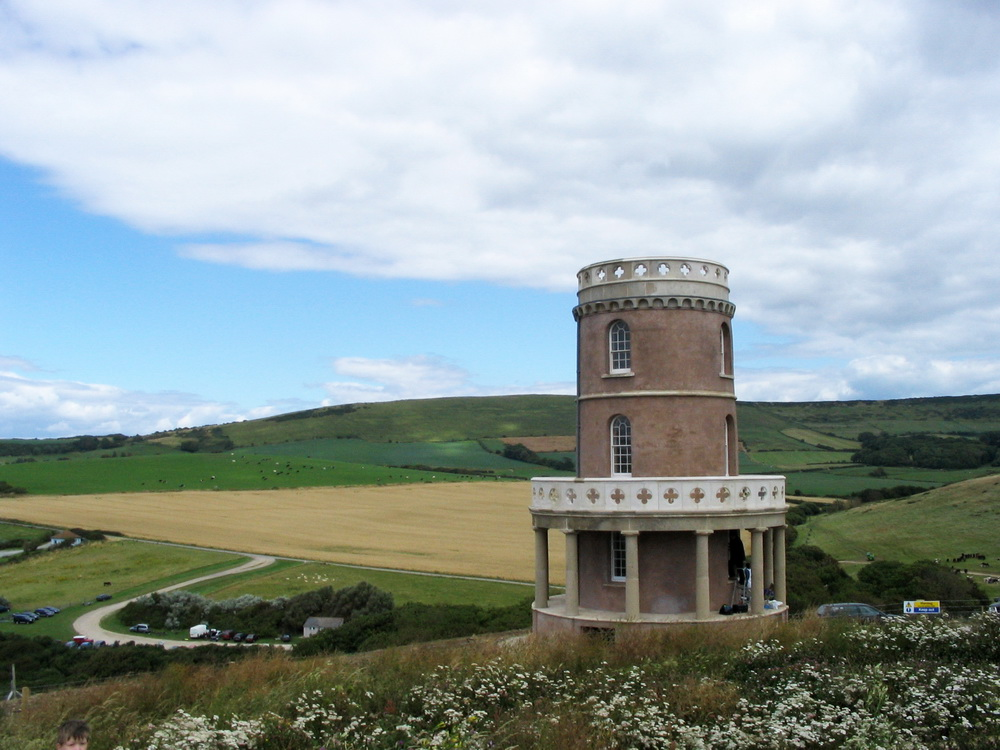
Clavell Tower, Dorset

Clavell Tower, also known as Clavell Folly or the Kimmeridge Tower, is a Grade II listed Tuscan style tower built in 1830. It lies on the Jurassic Coast, on the top of Hen Cliff just east of Kimmeridge Bay in the Isle of Purbeck in Dorset, England. It is now a Landmark Trust property and in August 2006 was moved 25 metres (82 ft) back from the crumbling cliff edge.

== History ==
Clavell Tower was built in about 1830 by Reverend John Richards Clavell of Smedmore House as an observatory and folly. The Reverend John Richards had changed his name to John Richards Clavell after inheriting the estate in 1817.

The tower is about 35 feet (11 m) high and rises over what is known as Hen Cliff which rises about 330 feet (100 m) above the sea. The main tower is constructed of mortared selected stone and the windows are formed from brick. The ground floor is surrounded by Tuscan colonnade and the roof has a parapet built in stone. In total the tower has four floors; a stone ground floor, a wooden first, a wooden second and a wooden third floor. The tower is surmounted upon a shallow stone basement. Evidence suggests there were fireplaces within the ground floor which indicated the tower was intended to be occupied throughout the year. However, access to the first and second floors would have been accessible solely via a ladder.

Thomas Hardy, the novelist, often took his first love Eliza Nicholls to Clavell Tower. He used an illustration of it in his Wessex Poems. The local Coastguards used it as a lookout until the 1930s, when it was gutted by fire. The desolate condition of Clavell Tower was the inspiration behind Baroness P. D. James's 1975 novel The Black Tower. The tower was used by Anglia Television as a principal location in their six-part adaptation of the story starring Roy Marsden in 1985, and it featured in the music video for The Style Council's 1985 single "Boy Who Cried Wolf".

== Relocation ==
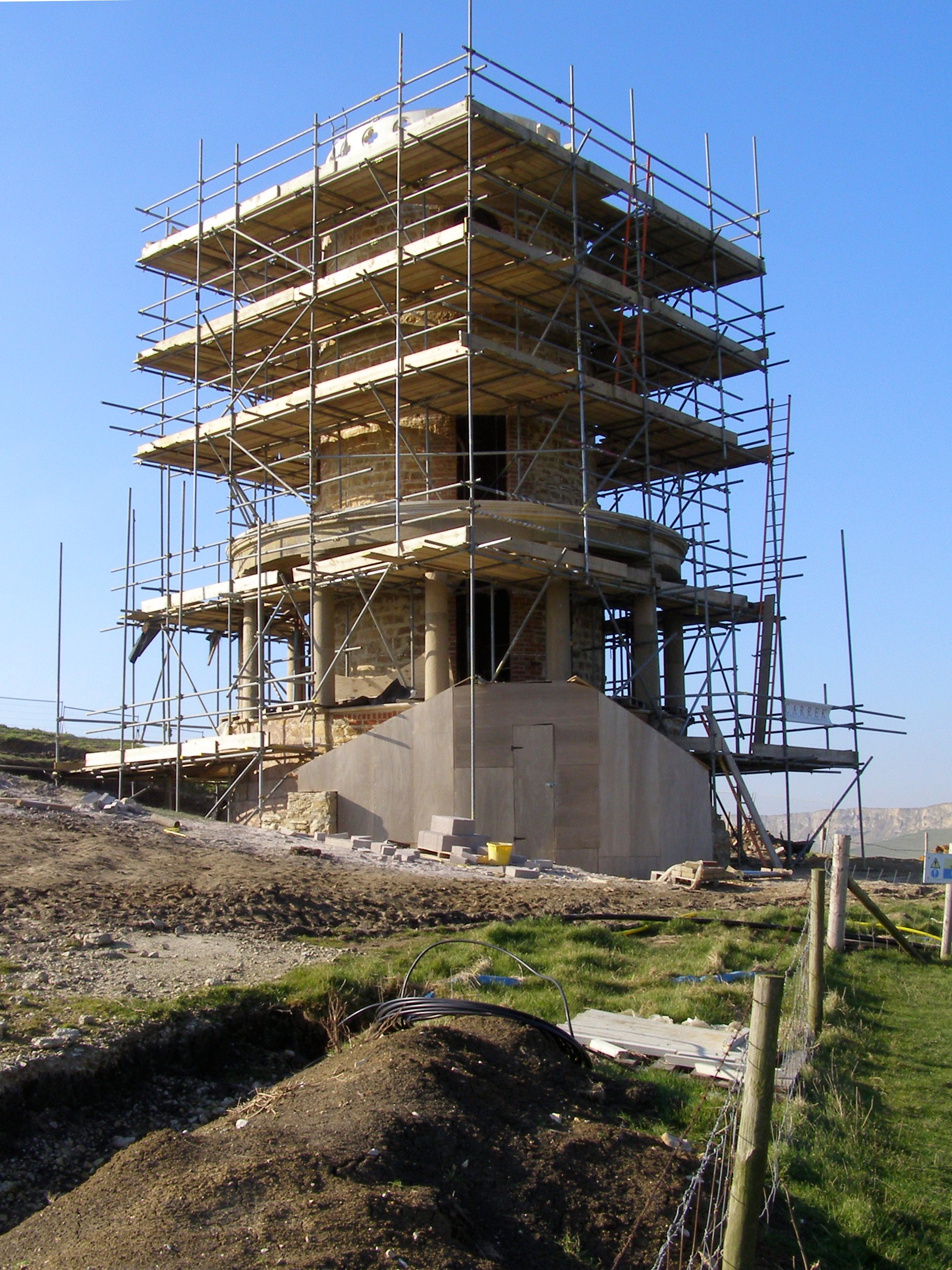
Clavell Tower in the final stages of re-erection, February 2008

Clavell Tower is owned by The Landmark Trust. The turret above Kimmeridge Bay was threatened by shoreline erosion and was in imminent danger of toppling into the ocean below. The Landmark Trust have moved the tower 25 metres (82 ft) landwards, away from the crumbling cliff top.

The tower was rebuilt to be suitable for letting. Work started on 5 September 2006. Each of the tower's 16,272 stones was removed, numbered and photographed by engineers and specialist builders, before being reassembled slightly inland. The interior was renovated so that it can be used as a holiday home. The final stone was replaced onto the tower on 25 February 2008 in a traditional topping-out ceremony. The tower used 298 new carved stones, about 1.5 miles (2.4 km) of pipes and cables, 10 tons of render on the walls, 1,344 bags of lime and about 100 tons of sand.

The building preservation charity hopes that the tower's maintenance will be paid for by rental income from holidaymakers. The monument accommodates two people. The living room on the top floor has a 360-degree view of the surrounding coast and countryside.

The location was chosen for one of the five locations for the installation of sculptures by Antony Gormley to mark the 50th anniversary of the Landmark Trust. The sculpture fell into the sea in September 2015.
