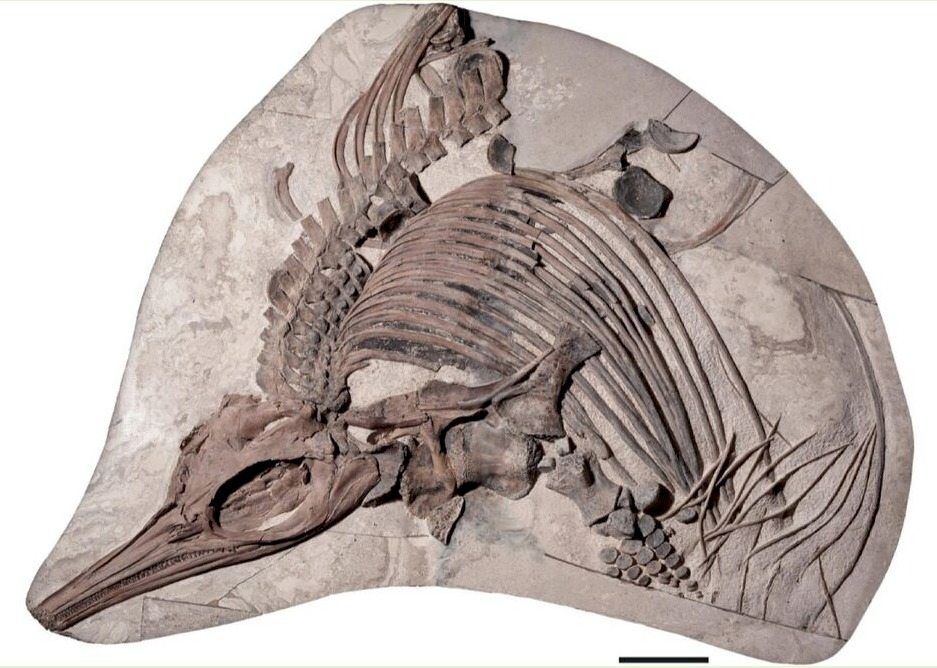
- Anterior portion of the holotype block MJML K1885

Scientific classification
- Kingdom: Animalia
- Phylum: Chordata
- Class: Reptilia
- Order: †Ichthyosauria
- Family: †Ophthalmosauridae
- Genus: †Thalassodraco; Jacobs & Martill, 2020
- Species: †T. etchesi

Binomial name
- †Thalassodraco etchesi Jacobs & Martill, 2020

= Thalassodraco =

Thalassodraco Temporal range: Late Jurassic, ~149.3–149 Ma

Extinct genus of ophthalmosaurid ichthyosaur

Thalassodraco (meaning "sea dragon") is an extinct genus of ophthalmosaurid ichthyosaur from the Late Jurassic (Tithonian) Kimmeridge Clay Formation of England. The type species, T. etchesi, was named in 2020, with the epithet in honour of the discoverer of the holotype, Steve Etches.

== Discovery and naming ==
The holotype, MJML K1885 and the isolated slab MJML K1886, and referred specimen, MJML K1174, were discovered by plumber turned palaeontologist Steve Etches in 2009 and he added it to his personal fossil collection. He put the fossil on display alongside the rest of his collection when his museum, The Etches Collection, opened to the public in 2016. According to Jacobs & Martill (2020), Etches' museum contains "many ichthyosaurs, including several articulated specimens and numerous isolated skull bones, vertebrae, girdle elements and fore and hind limbs. The majority of these specimens remain unstudied and several appear, at first glance, new to science." Photographs were provided by Steve Etches when he was notified that the fossil belonged to a new genus in 2016 and the species Thalassodraco etchesi was described in 2020 by Megan L. Jacobs and David M. Martill.

The specimens were discovered in strata of the Kimmeridge Clay dating from the Tithonian, the final stage of the Late Jurassic, and belonging to the Pectinatites pectinatus ammonite zone, indicating the fossils were between 149.3 and 149 million years old.

== Description ==
Size comparison

Thalassodraco was a medium sized ophthalmosaurid ichthyosaur, reaching up to 2.25 metres (7.4 ft) when fully grown. The holotype (MJML K1885; not including MJML K1886) appears to be relatively complete, with the known remains of MJML K1885 consisting of a well-preserved skull and jaw (although partially crushed in some areas), a complete set of ribs and a complete set of dorsals, most of the forelimbs, a complete ischiopubis and two chevrons. MJML K1886 is an isolated slab that consists of a single vertebra and two dorsal ribs.

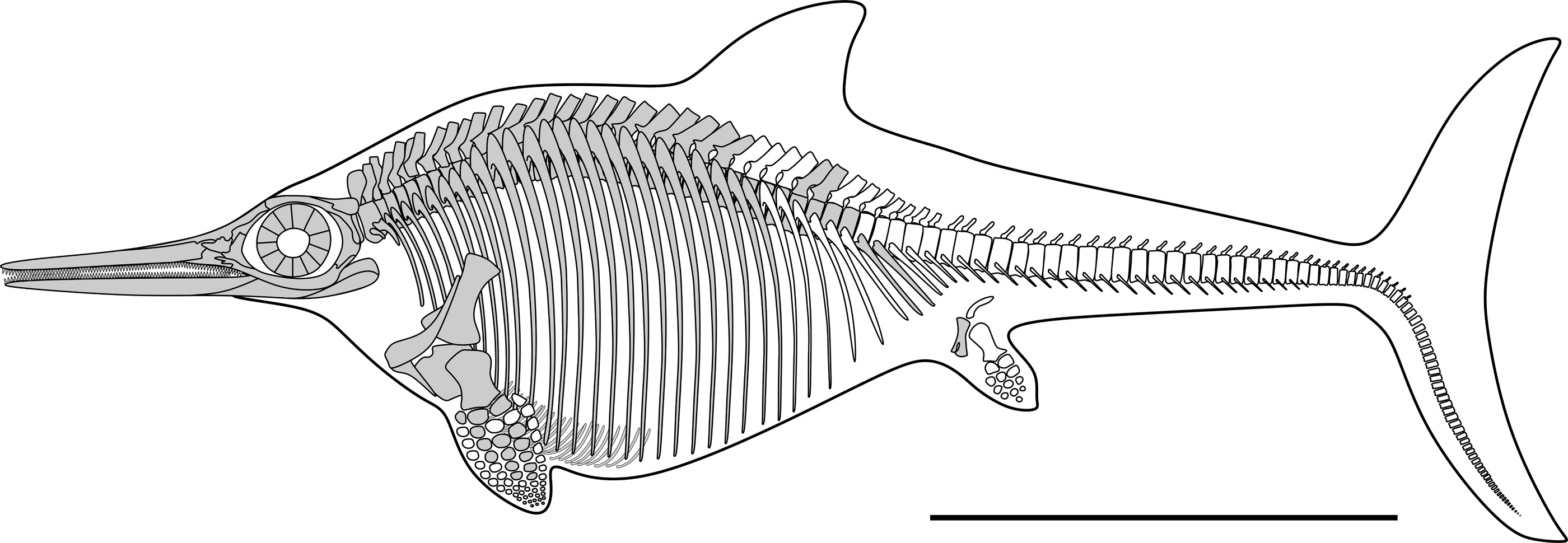
Skeletal reconstruction of MJML K1885, showing the known remains in grey and unknown remains in white

=== Skull ===
The left side of the skull is well preserved, while much of the right side is obscured by the left side. The distal ends of the maxilla and dentary are broken off, making exact measurements of the skull impossible, although estimates place it at around 52 centimetres (20 in) when complete. Also, the orbit was crushed during preservation. The scleral ring is composed of at least 14 trapezoidal plates, with each of these plates measuring on average around 17.7 millimetres (0.70 in) long.

The anterior extremities of the premaxillae have been eroded away, however the remaining portions are well preserved. A tooth count of the premaxilla reveals 28 teeth preserved and the posteriormost margin of the premaxilla contacts the anterodorsal margin of the jugal, but crushing prevents determining the presence of a premaxilla-lachrymal contact. The left maxilla is poorly exposed and twenty teeth were counted in the maxilla in total. The left nasal is well exposed and well preserved, but it is only slightly crushed near the internasal foramen. The nasal is overlain by the prefrontal, with a poorly defined suture caused by crushing.

The left dentary is well preserved, while the right side is obscured by the left side. The tooth count of the extant portion of the dentary is 35, while around twenty teeth were probably present in the missing portion, giving a total tooth count of approximately 73.

The teeth of the dentary, maxilla and premaxilla are similar, with slender conical crowns on expanded roots. The maximum known tooth size for Thalassodraco in the rostrum is around 7 millimetres (0.28 in), with a minimum of 4 millimetres (0.16 in), although teeth in the missing sections of the skull may have reached up to 5 centimetres (2.0 in). This would mean that Thalassodraco had either a tooth length index of anywhere between 0.2–0.19 (according to the method used to calculate tooth length index proposed by Motani, 1999). The preserved teeth are mainly composed of smooth enamel, with rounded tips.

=== Vertebral column ===
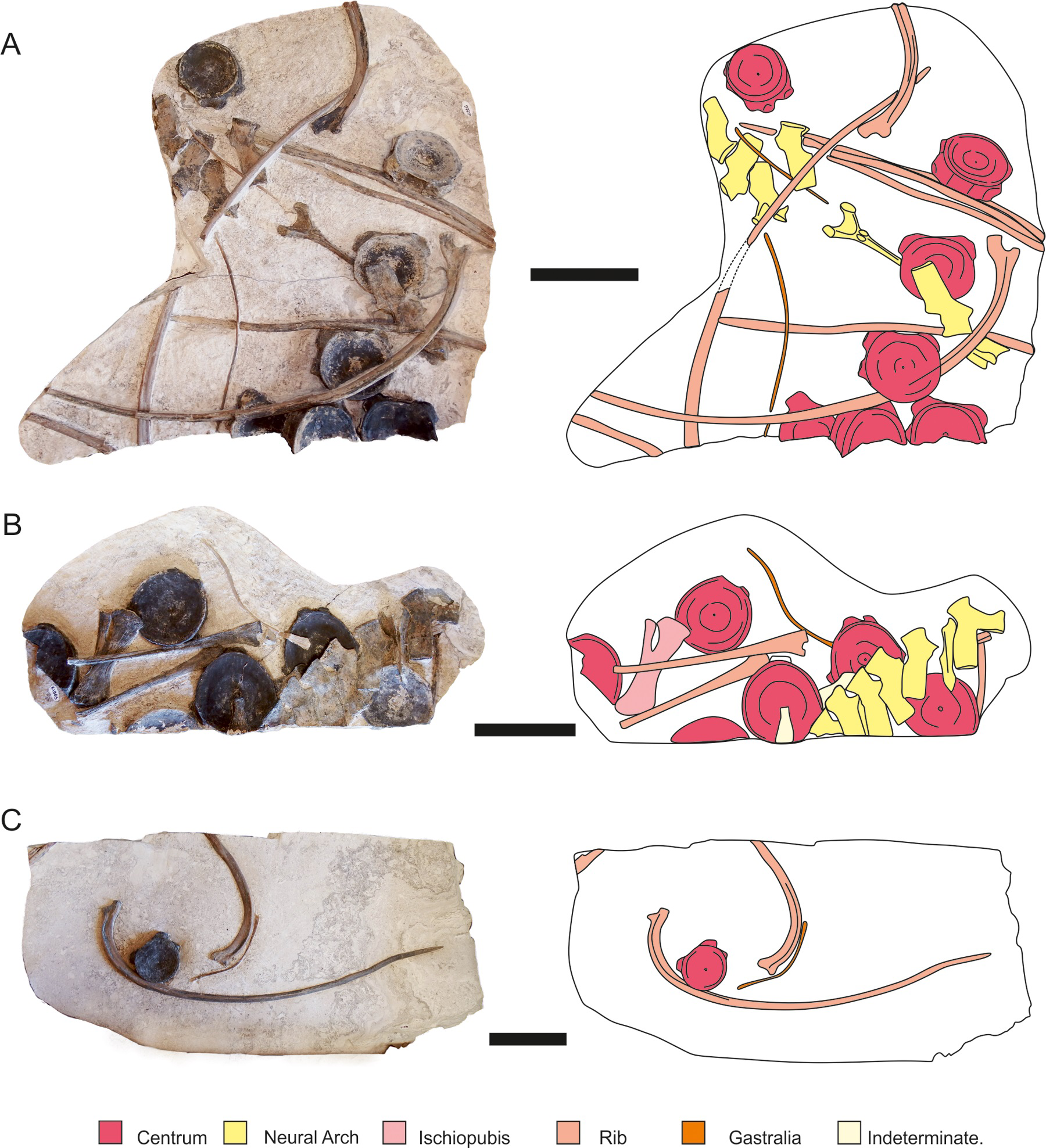
Isolated blocks of Thalassodraco (left) and colour-coded drawings (right) – isolated blocks of MJML K1885 (A-B) and MJML K1886 (C)

Thirty-three vertebrae of MJML K1885 are extant. The first ten centra have remained articulated, including the atlas-axis. None of the neural arches are fused to the vertebrae, while the neural arches on the main block have the neural spine broken on the dorsal border of the anterior zygapophysis. Some have been slightly displaced by a few millimetres, but most remain articulated, and no chevrons have been preserved.

The first 8 vertebrae from the atlas axis are articulated with their neural arches, but are not fused, while the latter eight are disarticulated. On the isolated slabs, there are 16 centra preserved, 13 complete and 2 partial, and one obscured by the rib cage. The height of the neural spines increase from 5.8 centimetres (2.3 in) to 7 centimetres (2.8 in) over the first eight centra. Twenty neural arches are preserved on MJML K1885, including that of the atlas-axis. They increase in height from 5.7 centimetres (2.2 in) to 7 centimetres (2.8 in), but the maximum height cannot be inferred due to disarticulation starting from the twentieth neural spine. The first 14 neural spines of MJML K1885 lack the V-shaped apical notch on the dorsal margin of the neural spines, but a slight notch is present in the last 6 articulated neural spines on MJML K1885. The neural spines of MJML K1886 also lack the V-shaped notch.

On MJML K1885, fifteen left dorsal ribs including and two cervical ribs articulating with the atlas-axis complex, four articulated right dorsal ribs and three disarticulated ribs, are preserved in total. There are 12 dorsal ribs preserved in total on the three isolated slabs. Gastralia are only present on the isolated slabs, with each gastralia being "displaced and disarticulated".

=== Limbs and limb girdles ===
The pectoral girdle (shoulder girdle) is complete and articulated. The left scapula, distal end of the left clavicle and part of the anteromedial process of the right coracoid are obscured from full view by the skull and vertebral column respectively. There was also a wide fracture that has been restored that occupies portions of the right clavicle, scapula and coracoid. Both coracoids and both scapulae were preserved, with the right scapula preserved in left side view. There has been significant restoration to the right coracoid and the left coracoid has been partly crushed by the overlying interclavicle. Also, both of the clavicles are preserved and are both present in the holotype.

The left forelimb has been slightly displaced from the pectoral girdle and is now displayed in dorsal view. The ulna, radius, intermedium and so are the distal phalangeal elements ("finger" bones). Most of the phalanges are preserved, although some are missing. Most of the right forelimb has not been preserved. The head of the right humerus is poorly preserved, and is mostly concealed by matrix, meaning that very little useful morphological data can be extracted from it.

The rear portion of MJML K1885 is disarticulated, preserving only a complete ischium and pubis on an isolated slab associated with 6 disarticulated vertebral centra, 2 ribs, 2 gastralia and 7 articulated neural spines. Due to the disarticulated nature, it is unclear whether the ischiopubis it is a left or right element. The ischium and pubis are fused at the top endfor approximately 0.75 of their length.

== Classification ==
The following cladogram by Jacobs and Martill (2020) shows the placement of Thalassodraco, which was found to be the sister taxon to Nannopterygius, within Ophthalmosaurinae:

- Ophthalmosauria
  - - Platypterygiinae
    - Ophthalmosaurinae
      - - - Acamptonectes densus
          - - Mollesaurus periallus
            - - Ophthalmosaurus natans (=Baptanodon)
              - Ophthalmosaurus icenicus
      - - - Gengasaurus nicosiai
          - - "Nannopterygius" borealis
            - - Thalassodraco etchesi
              - - Nannopterygius enthekiodon
                - Nannopterygius saveljeviensis (=Paraophthalmosaurus)
                - Nannopterygius yasykovi (=Yasykovia)
        - - Arthropterygius volgensis
          - - Arthropterygius thalassonotus
            - - Arthropterygius lundi (=Janusaurus)
              - - Arthropterygius hoybergeti (=Palvennia)
                - Arthropterygius chrisorum
