= The Etches Collection =

Fossil Museum in England

Coordinates: 50.6185°N 2.1193°W

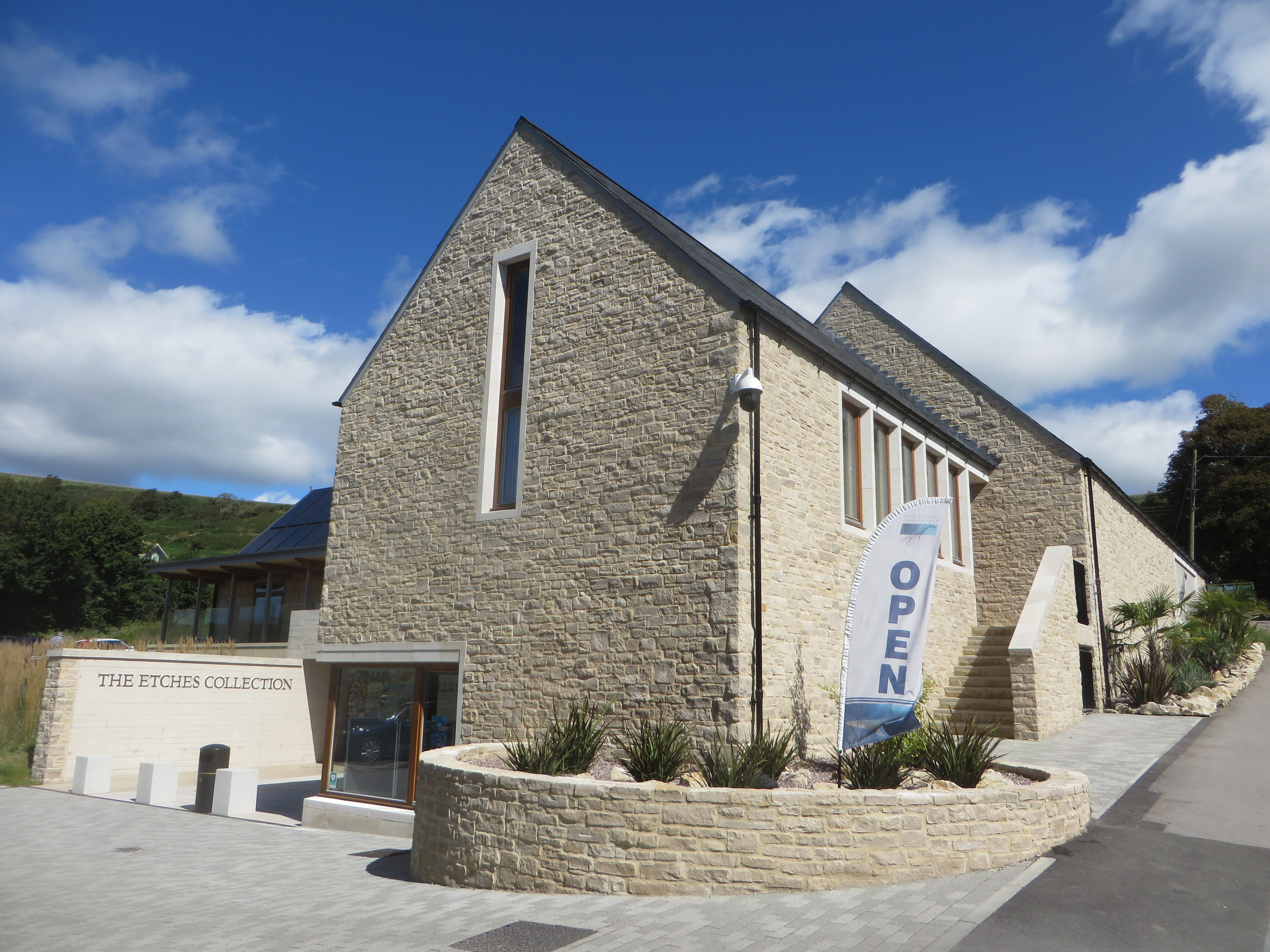
- View of the building housing The Etches Collection from the main road in Kimmeridge
- Established: 2016
- Location: Kimmeridge, Dorset, United Kingdom
- Founder: Steve Etches
- Architect: Kennedy O'Callagahan Architects
- Website: theetchescollection.org

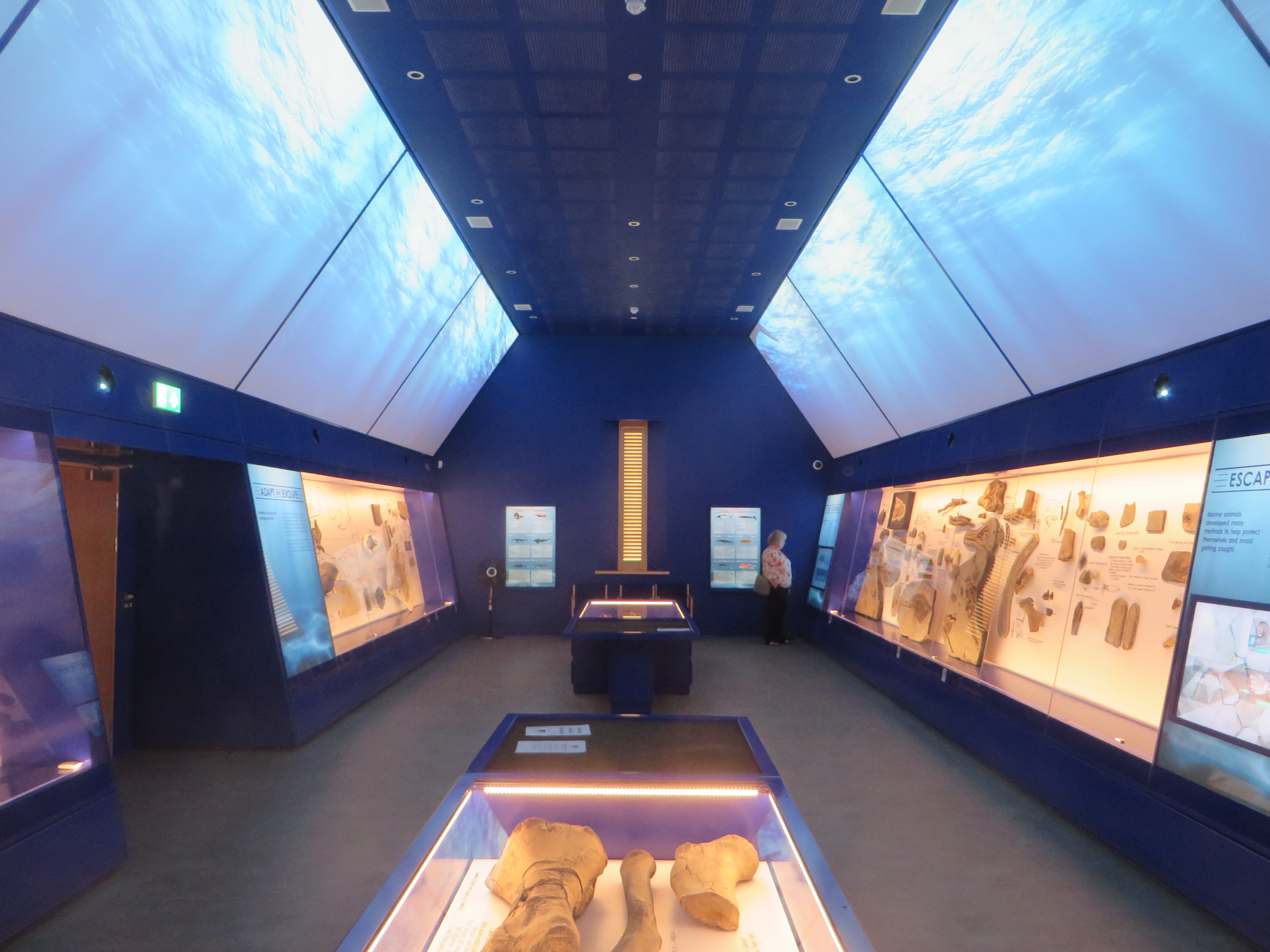
View of the main gallery in The Etches Collection

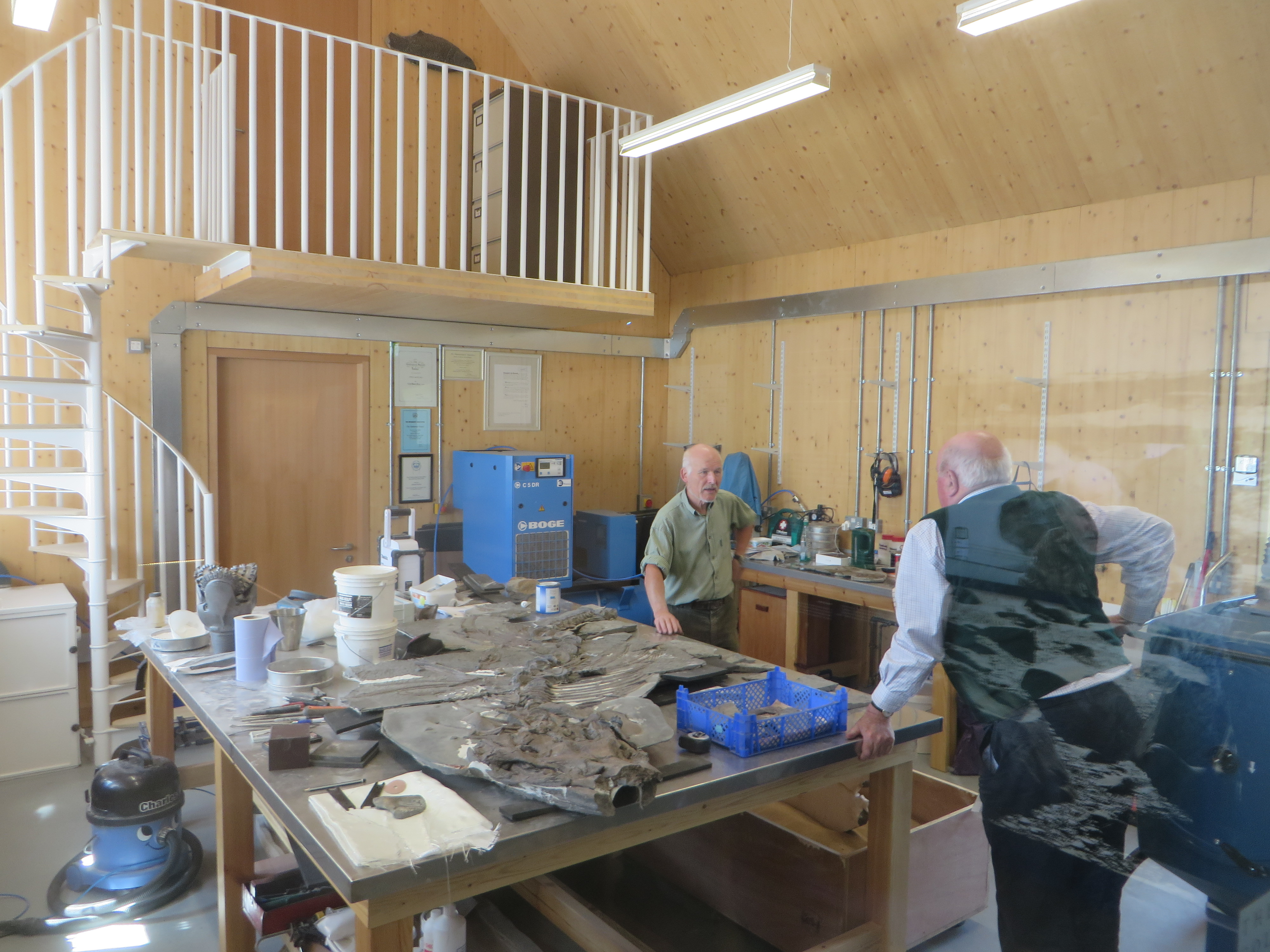
The founder Steve Etches in the workshop at The Etches Collection

The Etches Collection (also known as the Museum of Jurassic Marine Life) is an independent fossil museum located in the village of Kimmeridge, Dorset, England. It is based on the lifetime collection of Steve Etches, a fossil hunter for whom some of his finds have been named, from the local area on the Jurassic Coast, a SSSI and World Heritage Site, especially around Kimmeridge Bay and the Kimmeridge Ledges.

== Building ==
The museum building was opened in 2016 at a cost of £5 million to house a collection of over 2,000 fossil specimens so that they would remain accessible beyond the lifetime of Steve Etches.

== Collection ==
Etches had been collecting for over 30 years prior to the museum opening, and in that time he amassed a collection of fossils of international scientific importance that form the basis of the collection. The collection includes examples of ammonite eggs and fossils from the Upper Jurassic Kimmeridge Clay Formation including Thalassodraco etchesi.

In 2026, Big Sara, an Allosaurus skeleton, was lent to the collection to be on display for the next two years. Big Sara is currently the only real dinosaur skeleton on public display in Dorset, and is additionally the only real allosaurus skeleton on display in the United Kingdom.

== See also ==
- List of museums in Dorset
