= Steve Etches =

English plumber and fossil collector (born 1949)

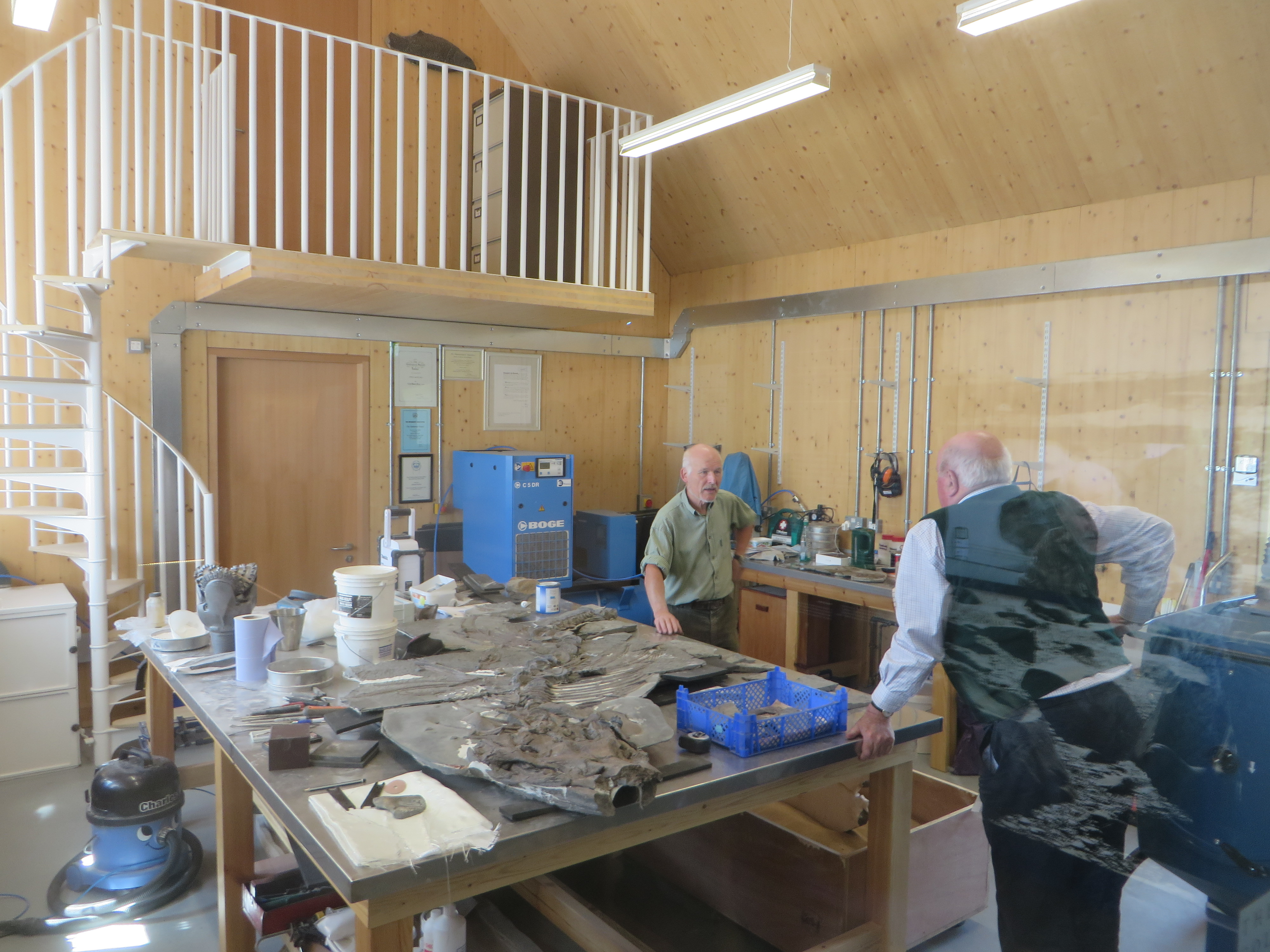
Etches in the workshop at The Etches Collection in Kimmeridge, Dorset

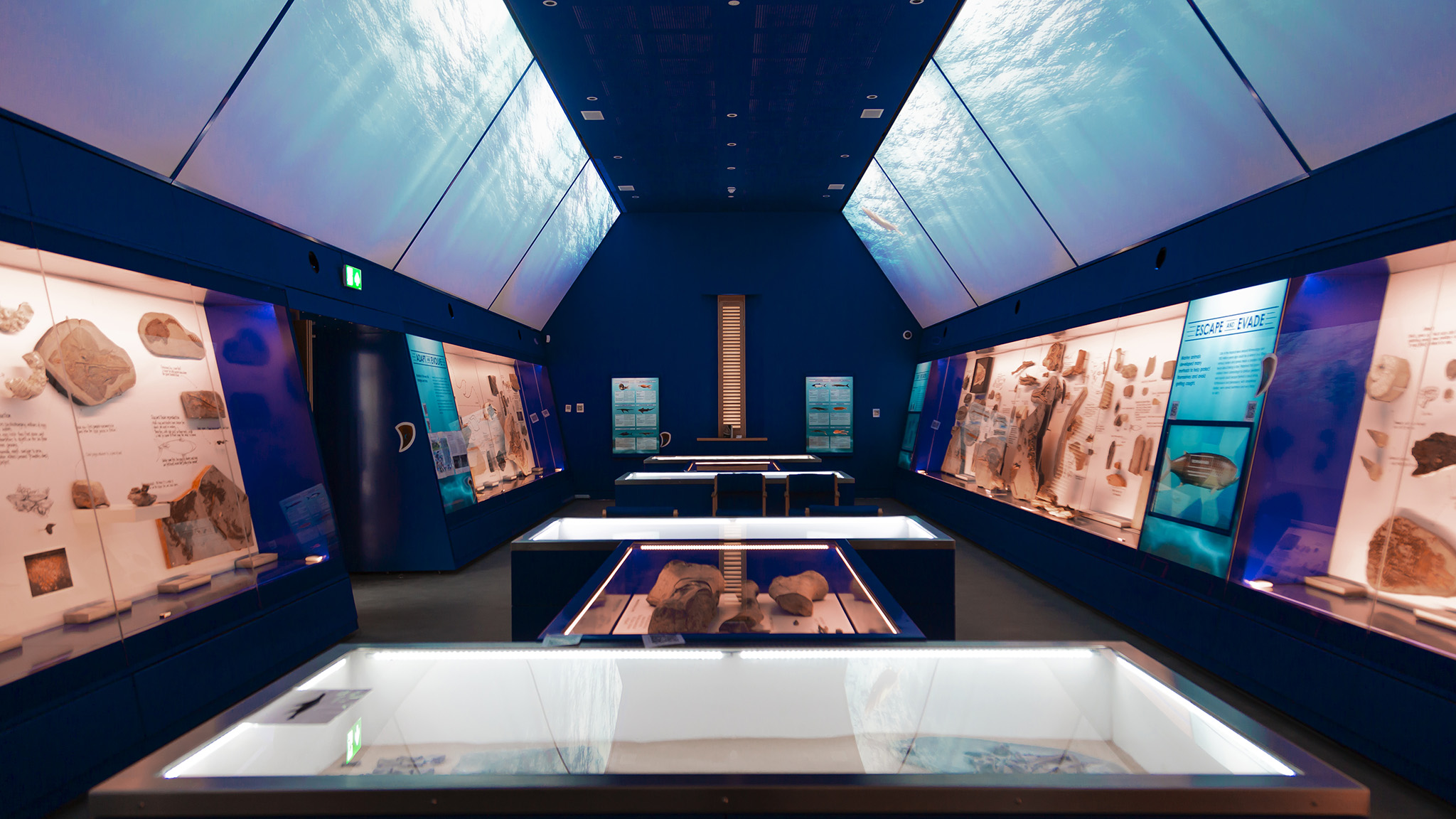
View of the main gallery in The Etches Collection

Steve Etches, MBE (born in 1949) is an English plumber, fossil collector and preparator in Kimmeridge, on the Isle of Purbeck in Dorset. From an early age on, Etches began to find, collect and restore the fossils he found on the Jurassic Coast. His collection is now housed in a museum called The Etches Collection which was purpose-built, both to house the collection and to replace the deteriorating local village hall.

Etches has won many prizes for his palaeontology and was made a Member of the Order of the British Empire by Queen Elizabeth II in 2014. In 2017, he was also awarded an Honorary Doctorate by the University of Southampton. On 22 April 2019, he appeared on the natural history podcast Trees A Crowd with David Oakes.

== Significant finds ==
Etches has been collecting for over 50 years, and in this time he has amassed an important collection of rare and unique fossils. His first find was a flint fossil sea urchin which he found at age 5. His collection now contains about 2,800 specimens, many of which are scientifically significant.

=== Ammonite eggs ===
Whilst cephalopod eggs had previously been described twice within scientific literature, the discovery of eight clusters of eggs in association with perisphinctid ammonite by Etches, Jane Clarke and John Callomon in 2008 provides the best preserved example of this rare glimpse into the life cycle of ammonites. The eggs show some phosphatic films, suggesting that the eggs were already decaying at their time of burial.

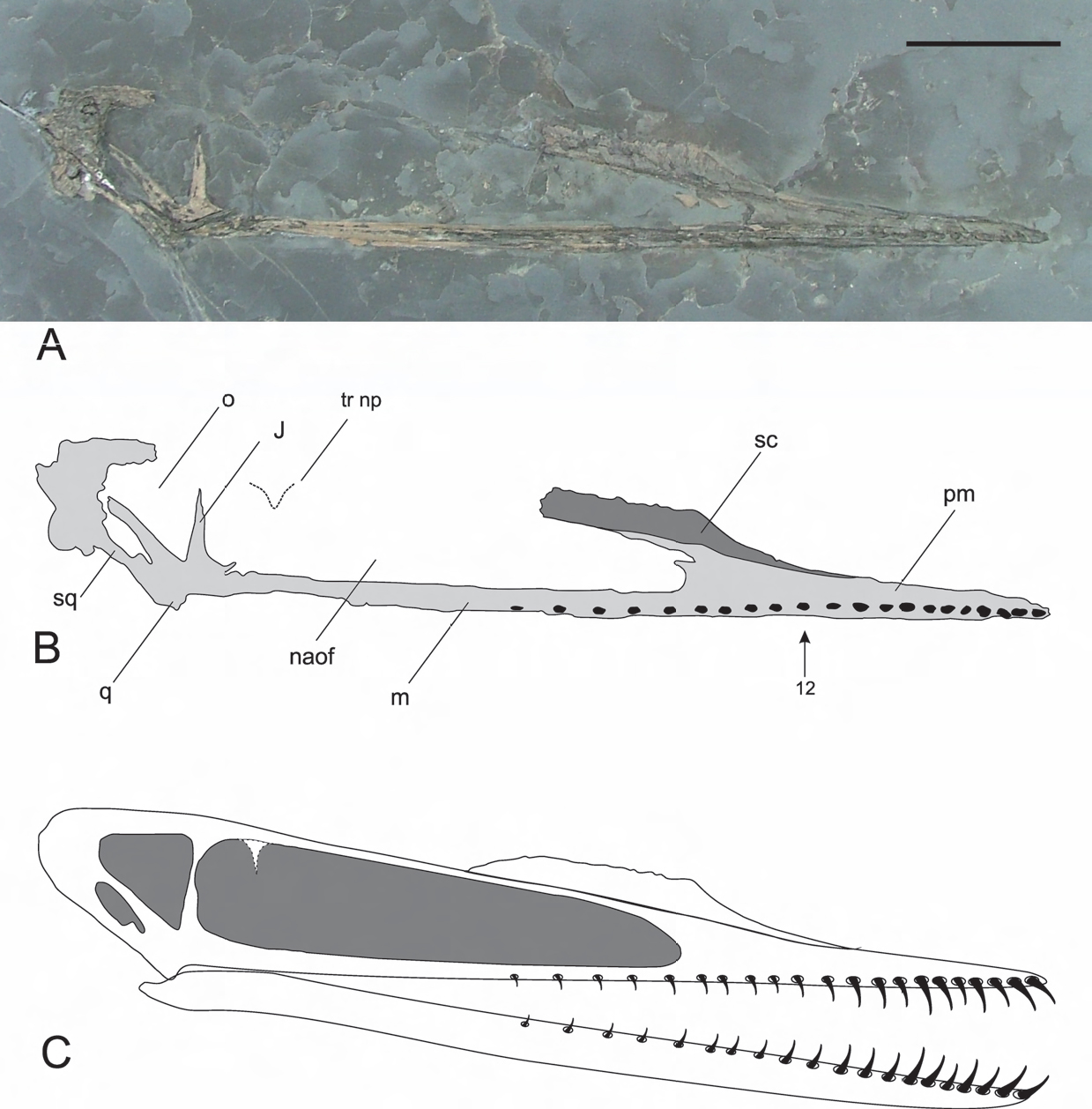
The skull of Cuspicephalus, a pterosaur found at Kimmeridge Bay

=== Cuspicephalus ===
The skull of the pterosaur Cuspicephalus was collected from the Kimmeridge Clay by Etches in December 2009 and then named by him and David Martill in 2013. Pterosaurs are considered rare within the Kimmeridge Clay as the clays were deposited a considerable distance from land and so such finds are thought to result from crash landings, possibly as a result of poor weather. Such a landing on water would likely be fatal to pterosaurs as their thin, hollow bones would be prone to breaking on impact with the sea, as seen in other pterosaur specimens collected by Etches.

=== Pliosaur ===
A large pliosaur skull is the subject of a BBC documentary, Attenborough and the Giant Sea Monster, which aired on 1 January 2024. The tip of the skull was found by Phil Jacobs when fossil collecting near Kimmeridge Bay. Etches later recovered the tip, before the remainder of the skull was collectively located in the cliff and confirmed when Etches abseiled down to the suspected site. The skull was later excavated from the cliff where it was emerging, 15 metres (49 ft) above the ground.

=== Other finds ===
Other finds by Etches include an exceptionally well-preserved dragonfly wing, the oldest recorded barnacle displaying colour, and a new genus of barnacle that has since been found living in the sea around Japan. A Jurassic species of ray, Kimmerobatis etchesi, and a deep diving ichthyosaur, Thalassodraco etchesi, were named in his honour. These specimens can all be seen in The Etches Collection museum in Kimmeridge.

== Awards ==
- 1993 – The Palaeontological Association's Award to Amateur Palaeontologists
- 1994 – the R. H. Worth Prize of the Geological Society
- 2005 – the Mary Anning Award of the Palaeontological Association
- 2006 – Halstead medal of the Geologists' Association
- 2014 – Member of the Most Excellent Order of the British Empire (MBE)
- 2017 – Doctor of Science honoris causa from the University of Southampton
- 2023 – Coke Medal of the Geological Society of London
