= Kimmeridge Bay =

Bay in Dorset, England

Coordinates: 50.6123647°N 2.13009631°W

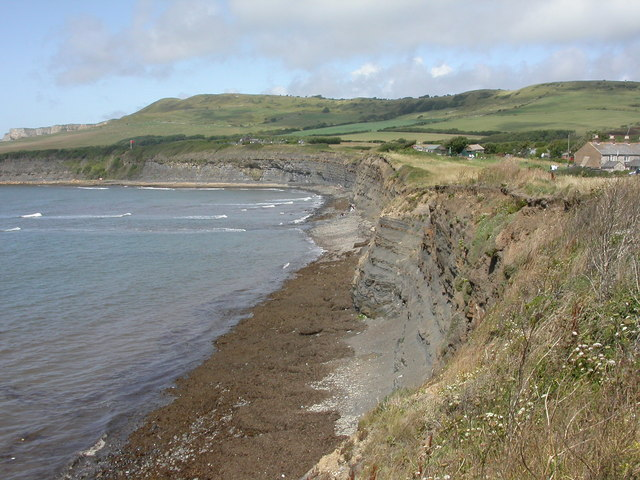
- Kimmeridge Bay cliffs, looking northwest

- Location within Dorset
- OS grid reference: SY906789
- Civil parish: Kimmeridge
- Unitary authority: Dorset
- Ceremonial county: Dorset
- Region: South West
- Country: England
- Sovereign state: United Kingdom
- Post town: WAREHAM
- Postcode district: BH20
- Police: Dorset
- Fire: Dorset and Wiltshire
- Ambulance: South Western
- UK Parliament: South Dorset

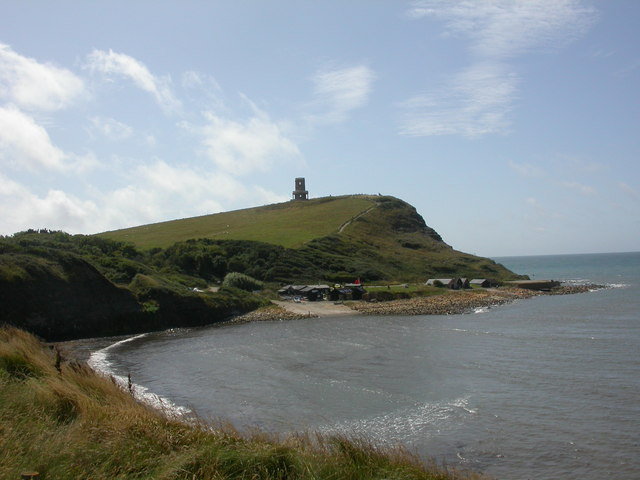
View southeast at Kimmeridge Bay with Clavell Tower in the background

Kimmeridge Bay ( /ˈkɪmərɪdʒ/) is a bay on the Isle of Purbeck, a peninsula on the English Channel coast in Dorset, England, close to and southeast of the village of Kimmeridge, on the Smedmore Estate. The area is renowned for its fossils, with The Etches Collection in the village of Kimmeridge displaying fossils found by Steve Etches in the area over a 30-year period. It is a popular place to access the coast for tourists. To the east are the Kimmeridge Ledges, where fossils can be found in the flat clay beds.

== Overview ==
Kimmeridge Bay forms part of the Jurassic Coast, a World Heritage Site. The coast is also part of a Site of Special Scientific Interest, and the whole area is part of the Dorset National Landscape. Kimmeridge is the type locality for Kimmeridge clay, the geological formation that covers most of the area. Within the clay are bands of bituminous shale. An oil well has operated on the shore of Kimmeridge Bay since 1959. The bay is roughly semi-circular, facing southwest. It is backed by low cliffs of Kimmeridge clay, and beneath the cliffs is a large wave-cut platform and a rocky shore with rock pools and attendant ecology. Kimmeridge Bay is a surfer and diver area.

The Purbeck Marine Wildlife Reserve and Fine Foundation Marine Centre are located here.

== Geology ==
The geology of the area around Kimmeridge Bay is world-renowned. It comprises bedrock formed in the Late Jurassic epoch, overlain in many places by superficial Quaternary head deposits. The bedrock is mostly Kimmeridge clay, except for the top of Smedmore Hill and along to Swyre Head, which is formed from Portland stone. Between this and the Kimmeridge clay, and outcropping just beneath the top of the hill, is a thin band of Portland sand. Landslip deposits from the Portland stone cover most of the steep southwest-facing slopes of the hills. Within the Kimmeridge clay are bands of bituminous shale and dolomite, which form flat ledges within Kimmeridge Bay that are exposed at low tide.

Kimmeridge gives its name to the Kimmeridgian, the division of the Jurassic period in which the beds were laid down, because of the quality of the cliffs and the fossils they yield. Kimmeridge is also the type locality for the Jurassic age Kimmeridge Clay formation, which is well represented in southern England, and provides one of the source rocks for hydrocarbons found in the Wessex and North Sea Basins.

The Kimmeridge Oil Field is northwest of Kimmeridge Bay. On the cliff west of the village is the Perenco "nodding donkey" oil pump which has been pumping continually since the late 1950s, making it the oldest working oil pump in the UK. The well currently yields around 65 barrels per day (10.3 m^{3}/d) from the Middle Jurassic strata that lie around 1,150 feet (350 m) below the cliff. The well has been operating for this long because it has tapped into a network of connected reserves; however the yield is decreasing year on year. The oil is transported by tanker to the Perenco site at Wytch Farm from whence it is piped to the main refinery on Southampton Water.

== Surfing ==
Kimmeridge Bay is a surfing area which breaks infrequently due to its lack of exposure to Atlantic Ocean swells, but can produce walls of water in the right conditions. Below the cliffs to the east are the Kimmeridge Ledges, with slow left- and right-hand breaking waves; the right-handers can spiral for 70 yards (64 m) or more into the bay. To the west is the Broad Bench promontory, within the Ministry of Defence firing range and only accessible when the ranges are open to the public.

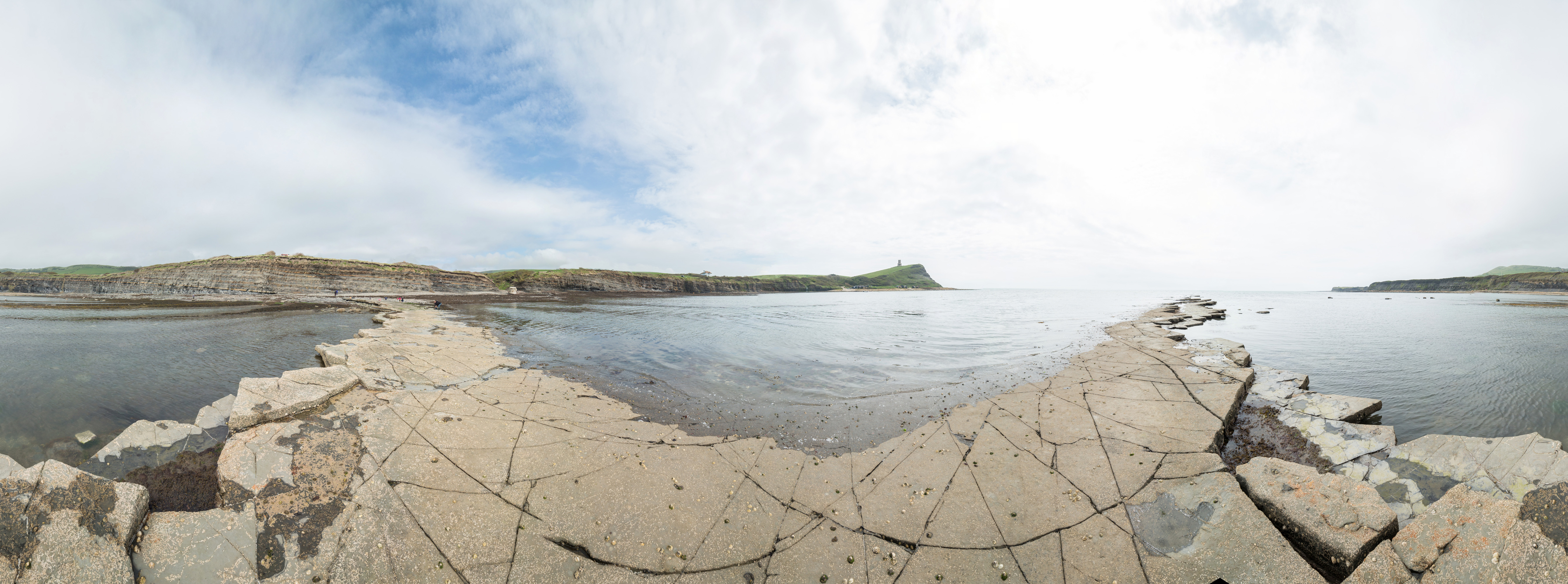
Panoramic view of Kimmeridge Bay

== See also ==
- The Etches Collection
- List of Dorset beaches
- Geology of Dorset
