= Smedmore House =

Country house in Dorset, England

Coordinates: 50.6094°N 2.1086°W

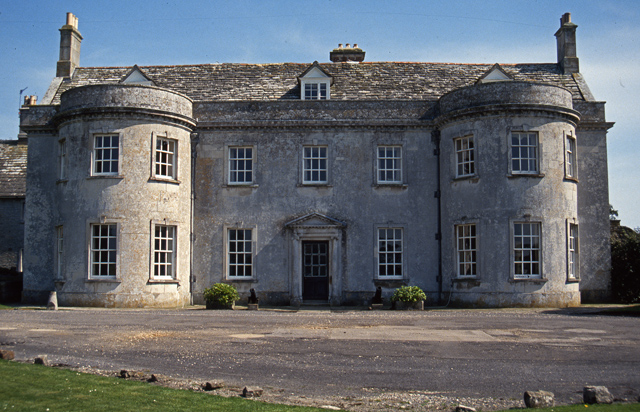
Smedmore House, northwest front

Smedmore House is a country house near Kimmeridge, Dorset, in England. It was originally built by Sir William Clavell around 1620, partially rebuilt by Edward Clavell around 1700, and greatly augmented by George Clavell around 1760. It is a Grade II* listed building. It is not normally open to the public, although there are regular open days and the House can be rented or hired for functions.

== History ==
The manor of Smedmore, near Kimmeridge, had historically belonged to the Smedmore family, however they sold it to William Wyot in 1392. Around 1426 it passed into the Clavell family with the marriage of William's granddaughter Joanna to John Clavell. The Clavells also inherited the manor of Barneston, near Church Knowle, from Joanna's cousin John de Stoke, and it was Barneston that was to be their main residence for the next 200 years.

John Clavell's descendant Sir William Clavell (1568–1644) earned his knighthood fighting in Ireland for Elizabeth I against the Earl of Tyrone. On his return to England he engaged in various projects to exploit the oil shale found in the cliffs near Kimmeridge. Initially he attempted the production of alum, but this infringed a monopoly granted by James I, and his works were confiscated. He then set up works for the production of glass and salt, using the shale as fuel. The chief disadvantage of burning shale was the smell - one of Clavell's neighbours compared it to a "close stool". In order to be closer to — but upwind of — these works Sir William set about building a new house at Smedmore. However, along with the losses incurred from his alum works, this proved to be ruinously expensive and he ran up debts of some £20,000. He was therefore forced to sell much of the land he had inherited, including Barneston.

Sir William married Mabel Roper, a great-granddaughter of Sir Thomas More, but the marriage proved childless. His heir was therefore his nephew John Clavell, who had gained notoriety as a highwayman but fame as a poet. Sir William therefore effectively disinherited all of his immediate family, and left Smedmore House to a distant cousin, Roger Clavell of Langcotes, near Winfrith Newburgh.

Roger died in 1686, having outlived all his sons. Smedmore therefore passed to his grandson, Edward Clavell (1675–1738). He had been born in Cossimbazar in Bengal, where his father, Walter Clavell (1639–1677), had been a merchant for the East India Company. Edward partially rebuilt the house, and was succeeded by his sons: firstly Edward (1721–1744) and then George (1725–1774). George made considerable alterations to the house, including building the current frontage. On his death, it passed to his nephews, the sons of his sister Margaret and her husband William Richards: firstly George Richards (1755–1817) and then Rev. John Richards (1759–1833). Each of these adopted the name of Clavell upon inheriting Smedmore House.

John Clavell-Richards, who had previously been the rector of Church Knowle, is chiefly remembered for building the Clavell Tower, a folly on the cliff-top near Kimmeridge which was relocated and restored in 2008. After his death there was a court case that invalidated his alleged will. Instead a deal between his surviving Heirs-in-Law ensured that Smedmore House remained in the family, under the ownership of his niece, Louisa Pleydell (1790–1863), and her husband, Lieutenant Colonel John Mansel (1776–1863). It has remained in the Mansel family ever since, the present owner being the historian Philip Mansel — a direct descendant of the William Wyot who bought Smedmore over 600 years ago.
