= Povington Hill =

Hill in Dorset, England

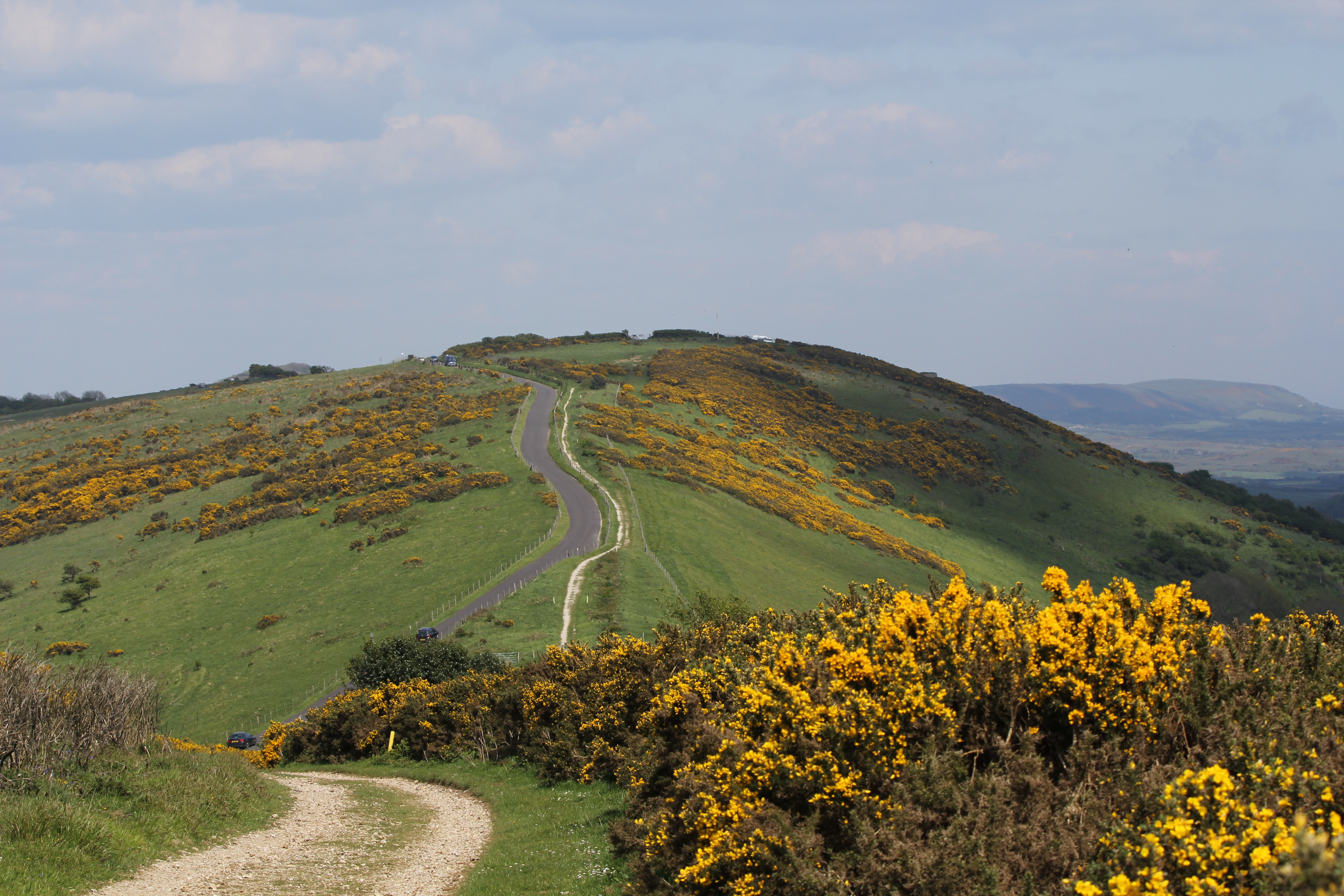
- Povington Hill seen from Whiteway Hill to the west.

Highest point
- Elevation: 198 m (650 ft)
- Prominence: 107 m (351 ft)
- Parent peak: Swyre Head
- Listing: Tump
- Coordinates: 50°37′47″N 2°09′35″W

Geography
- Location: Dorset, England
- Parent range: Purbeck Hills
- OS grid: SY888811
- Topo map: OS Landranger 194

Povington Hill, at 198 metres (650 ft) high, is one of the highest points on the chain of the Purbeck Hills in south Dorset on the southern coast of England. Its prominence of 107 metres (351 ft) means it is listed as one of the Tumps, although map sources suggest this honour should go to Ridgeway Hill further east.

Povington Hill lies within the danger area of the Lulworth Ranges and is out of bounds during the week, but becomes a popular viewing point and picnic site at weekends and public holidays. From the top there are good views of Worbarrow Bay, the abandoned village of Tyneham, St. Aldhelm's Head, Swyre Head and the English Channel beyond Gad Cliff to the south. In good visibility Portland Bill may be seen. To the north the view extends over the firing ranges on the Dorset Heaths. The hill is largely treeless, being covered in rough pasture and scrubland.

== Access ==
Povington Hill is accessible when the ranges are open to the public. A minor road from East Lulworth to Creech runs over the summit where there is a free car park and picnic area. From the car park, range walks lead westwards along the ridgeline to Whiteway Hill and Flower's Barrow, branching south into Tyneham, and eastwards to Ridgeway Hill.
