= Stonehill Down Nature Reserve =

Nature reserve in Dorset, England

Stonehill Down
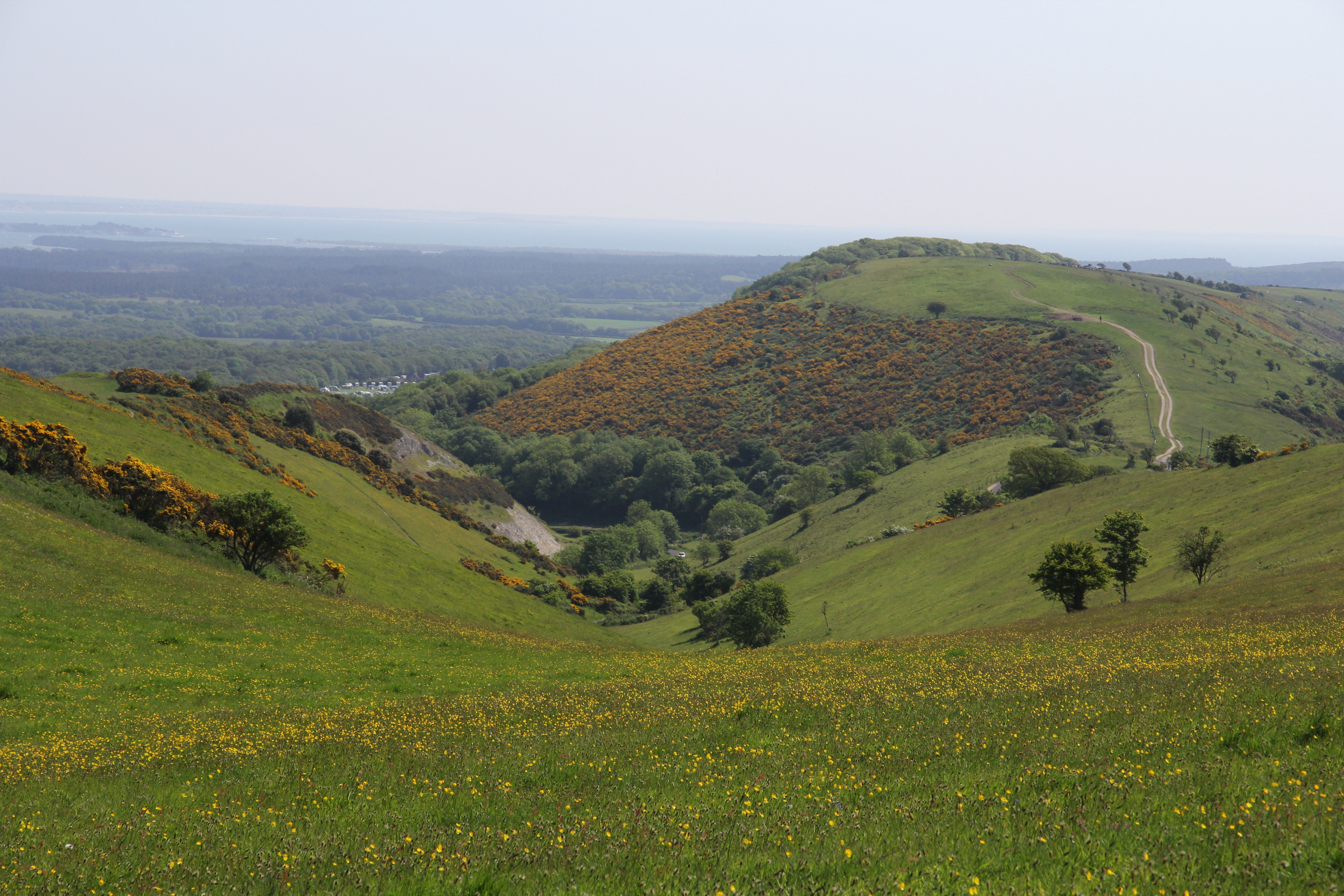
- View of Stonehill Down looking east towards Knowle Hill
- Interactive map of Stonehill Down
- Location: Purbeck Hills, Dorset, England
- OS grid: SY 925825
- Coordinates: 50°38′21″N 2°6′17″W
- Area: 20 hectares (49 acres)
- Operator: Dorset Wildlife Trust
- Open: all year

The Stonehill Down Nature Reserve is a downland nature reserve on the Purbeck Hills in the county of Dorset, England. It is managed by the Dorset Wildlife Trust.

Stonehill Down covers an area of 20 hectares and lies high on the chalk ridge running west/east across the Isle of Purbeck with far-reaching views across the Wareham Forest, with Poole Harbour to the east. It is bounded by the line of the Purbeck Hills to the south, with the summit of Ridgeway Hill about 1 kilometre to the west-southwest, and Corfe Castle about 3 kilometres to the west.

== Flora and fauna ==
The reserve contains two distinct habitats: broadleaf woodland and chalk downland. The broadleaf, coppiced woodland lies on the northern slopes of the Purbeck Ridge, which is steep in places, where primroses and ramsons thrive and toothwort grows around the base of hazel trees in spring.

The ridge itself is primarily chalk downland, comprising rough pasture with some scrub. Here, there are numerous downland flowers including Horseshoe vetch and Carline thistle. In early summer, Common spotted, Early purple and Bee orchid may be seen, whilst in late summer and early autumn, Autumn Lady's-tresses, Autumn gentian (or Felwort) and Nettle-leaved bellflower are in bloom. This area is also heavily grazed.

Butterflies of note include the Lulworth skipper and Adonis blue.

== Access ==
There are no visitor facilities and the nearest places to park area are either in East Creech just north of the reserve, or on the minor road to Creech Grange at the top of the col to Creech Barrow Hill. Several paths criss-cross the reserve or run along its boundaries and walkers can access the reserve from the ridgeway between Ridgeway Hill and Corfe Castle.
