= St James's Church, Kingston, Purbeck =

Church in Dorset, England

St James's Church, Kingston
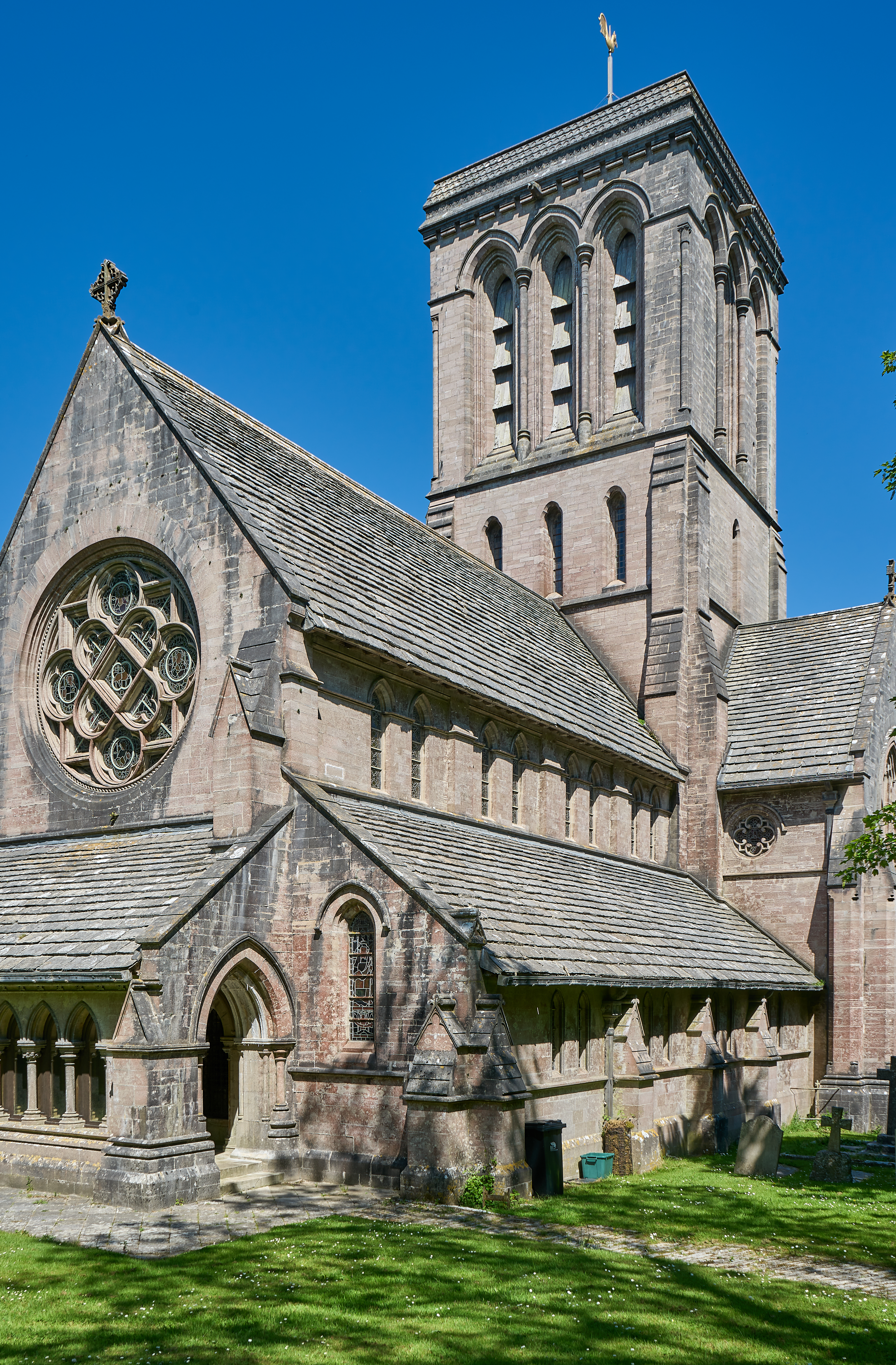
- St James's Church, Kingston, from the west (May 2021)

- Location within Dorset
- OS grid reference: SY 95555 79552
- Location: Kingston, Isle of Purbeck, Dorset
- Country: England
- Denomination: Anglican

History
- Founded: 1874
- Dedication: St James the Great

Architecture
- Functional status: Parish church
- Architect: George Edmund Street
- Style: Gothic Revival
- Years built: 1874-1880
- Construction cost: £70,000 (1880)

Administration
- Province: Canterbury
- Diocese: Salisbury
- Archdeaconry: Dorset
- Deanery: Purbeck
- Benefice: St Aldhelm
- Parish: Kingston

Listed Building – Grade I
- Official name: Parish Church of Saint James
- Designated: 20 November 1959
- Reference no.: 1120984

The Church of St James is the parish church for the village of Kingston, located on the Isle of Purbeck in Dorset. The church is a notable example of the Gothic Revival style and is a Grade I listed building.

== History ==
From the 12th century, Kingston was a chapelry of nearby Corfe Castle, served by a chapel of ease in the east of the village. In 1833, John Scott, 1st Earl of Eldon, demolished the old chapel and rebuilt it, at his own expense, on the same site to become the parish church. The new chapel, dedicated to St James, was designed in the Gothic Revival style by George Stanley Repton and followed the plan of the original chapel.

In 1873, John Scott III, now the 3rd Earl of Eldon, commissioned George Edmund Street to draw up designs for a much larger church (the present building), on a new site in the village, for use as a private chapel for the Eldon estate. Construction commenced the following year, and within only six years, the new church was finished, at a cost of £70,000. This was a massive sum of money for such a tiny village, and according to the National Archives, equivalent to more than £4.3 million in 2017.

The church remained as a private chapel for the Eldon estate until 1921, when the now Lord Eldon conveyed the entire chapel to the Church Commissioners and on October 11 of that year, was consecrated. In January 1922, the Church Commissioners replaced the original chapel as the parish church, substituting it for Street's church. The original 1833 chapel then became the church hall for many years, until it was sold to be converted to a private residence in 1977. The former church remains a private residence to this day.

In the 1980s, serious work was required on the church to prevent further damage and to keep it standing. Due to its prominent and exposed position, located on a limestone escarpment in the Purbeck Hills some 135 metres (443 feet) above sea level, the church suffered extensive weathering and significant erosion from storms. Despite the small congregation, fundraising and repairs were completed by the end of the decade.

== Architecture ==
=== Influences ===
There have been several suggestions by prominent architectural historians as to the inspiration Street used for the design at Kingston. Gavin Stamp suggested 13th-century French Gothic influences in the apse, and that Kingston's tower was based upon the church at Norrey-en-Bassin, located in Normandy, France. David Brownlee believed Kingston was based upon the Church of the Holy Angels at Hoar Cross in Staffordshire, which was designed by Street's friend George Frederick Bodley. Nikolaus Pevsner noted that the stair turret on Kingston's north transept was a replica of that at Christchurch Priory, at the time in Hampshire, now in Dorset. English Heritage record it as having 13th-century Early English Gothic influences.

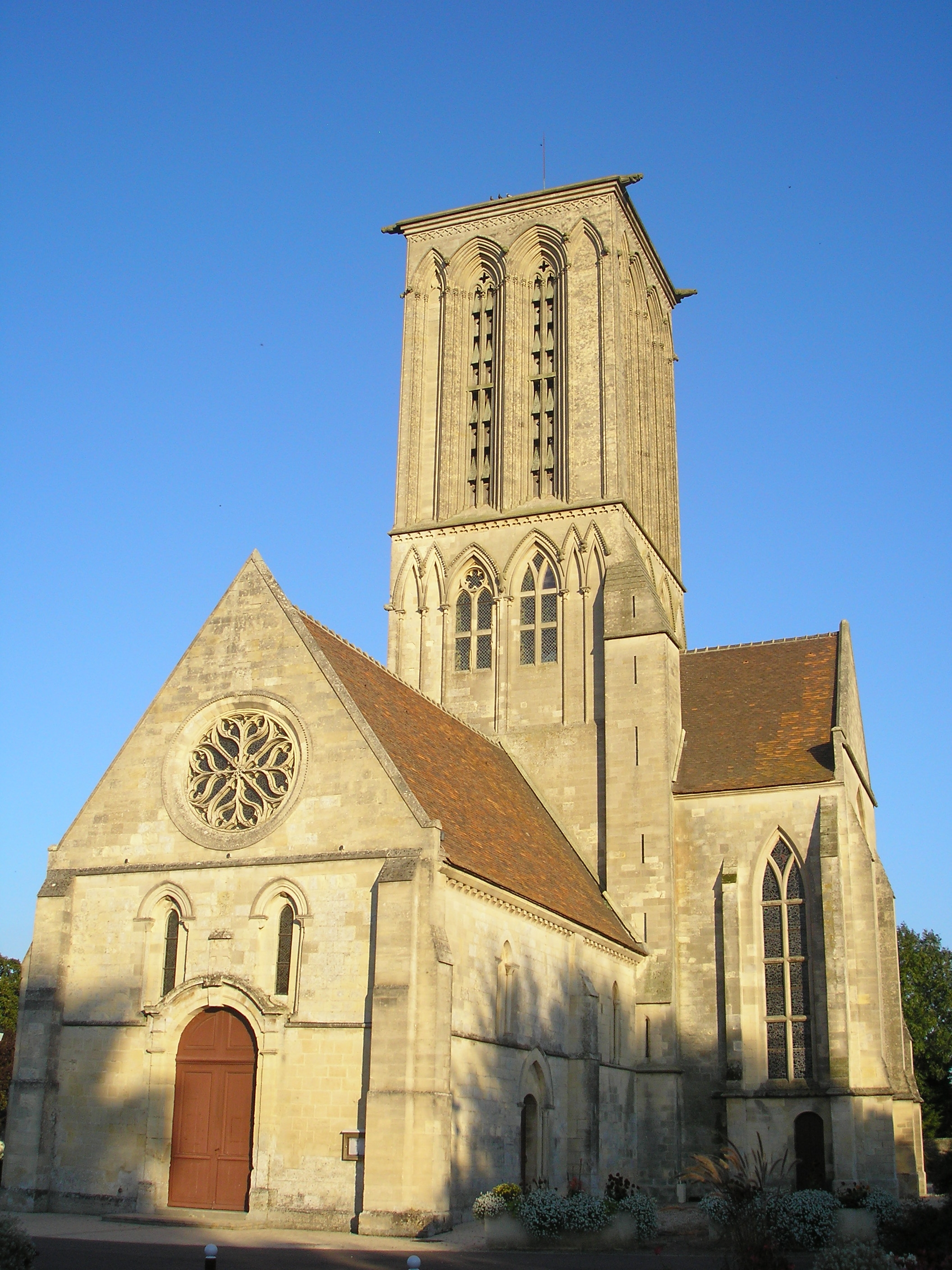
The church at Norrey-en-Bassin, which was said to be the inspiration for Kingston's tower

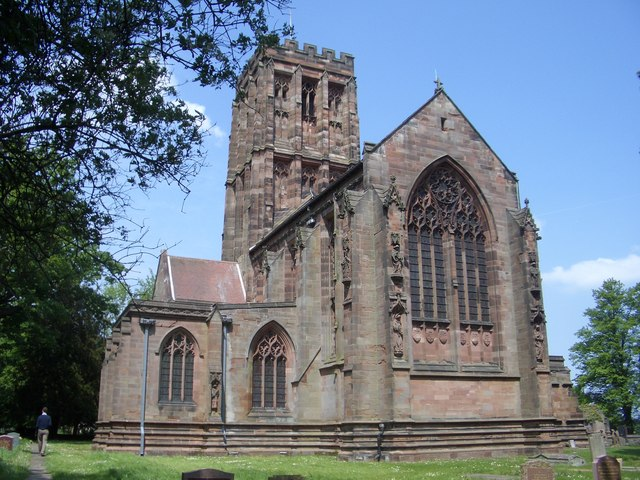
Holy Angels, Hoar Cross, Staffordshire

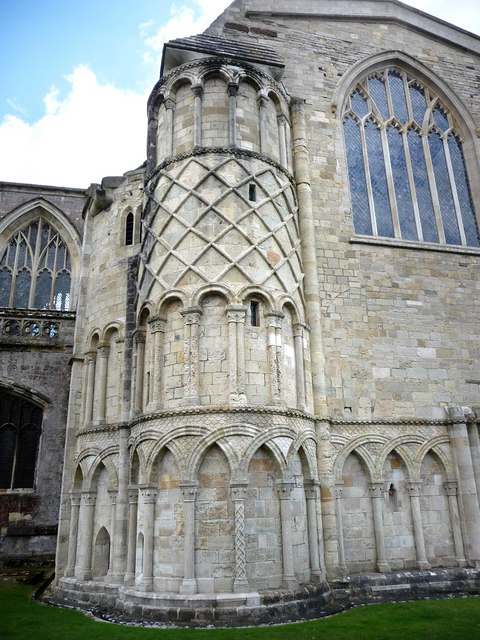
The north transept stair turret at Christchurch Priory, which was copied by Street for Kingston

=== Exterior ===
For such a small parish, having a population of only 166 residents (2011 estimate), the present church is of substantial size, giving it the nickname of the "Cathedral of the Purbecks". The building is cruciform in plan, with a four-bay aisled nave, transepts, apse, and central tower. The west end begins with a lean-to narthex which runs the full width of the nave. Above the narthex is a large rose window, some 12 feet (3.7 metres) in diameter, formed of 21 individual segments. The nave aisles both finish with single lancet windows and feature four pairs of smaller lancet windows, separated by buttresses, along the length of the nave. The nave clerestory above is similar in plan, with four pairs of slightly larger lancet windows with smaller buttresses.

The church features two transepts, one each to the north and south of the tower, which are one bay in length. The south transept is lit by three large lancet windows, that of the north transept is lit with only two. The north transept features a latticed stair turret on its north-east side, inspired by that at Christchurch. A double-gabled vestry projects eastwards from the north transept. East of the crossing lies the chancel and sanctuary, each of one bay, the latter terminating in an apse. The chancel and apse are again lit by lancet windows, separated by gabled buttresses.

The central tower is the chief feature of the church, and it rises two stories above the ridge of the roof. Supported by angle buttresses, the ringing chamber is lit by three lancet windows on the west and north sides, those of the south and east sides only featuring one central lancet. The belfry stage above follows the same plan, with two sides containing three lancets, and two sides containing one. However, these are louvred, rather than glazed. They also feature several recessed arches surrounding the louvres. The tower is crowned with a moulded parapet, which features stepped coning.

=== Interior ===
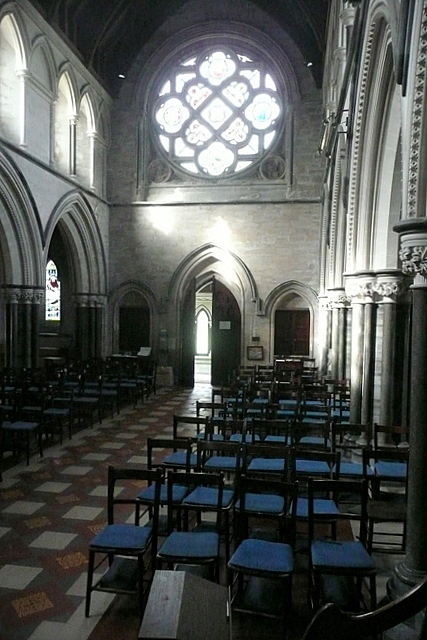
The nave, looking west towards the rose window.

Entering the nave from the narthex, it is formed of four bays, aisled, with a clerestory above. The nave arcades are decorated with dog-tooth carvings, with minor differences between those on the south and north arcades, and stiff-leaf capitals. The nave aisle windows depict biblical figures and saints, which are attributed to Clayton and Bell. The larger lancets that face westwards in the aisles represent Noah and his ark. The main feature of the nave is the large rose window, reminiscent of that at Lausanne Cathedral, Switzerland, which was designed by Street and executed by Clayton and Bell. Unlike the transepts, chancel and crossing, neither the nave nor aisles are vaulted in stone, instead, the wagon roof, featuring purlins, is open to the church.

The crossing and transepts feature quadripartite vaulting, that of the sanctuary is a sexpartite vault. The crossing arches are similar to those of the nave arcade, with moulded capitals. The nave is separated from the rest of the church by a fine wrought iron screen located in the crossing, surmounted by a large and intricate cross. The crossing features the original Victorian choir stalls, made of oak, and can seat ten choristers on each side. The vault below the crossing tower has a large removable hatch to allow the bells to be raised or lowered to and from the tower.

The chancel is the most richly decorated part of the church, with Purbeck marble shafts lining the windows, and it is raised several steps above the level of the crossing. The sanctuary has both a piscina and sedilla near the altar.

The church has fine ceramic Victorian floor tiles, of various sizes and designs, most likely manufactured by Mintons of Stoke-upon-Trent.

=== Materials ===
The exterior of the church is built from broken shell limestone, otherwise known as Burr, sourced from within the 3rd Earl of Eldon's own estate at Blashenwell Farm Pit, less than a mile away. The stone has now got a pink hue, caused by algae growing on the building.

The interior of the church is fabricated from two different types of stone, both quarried in Purbeck itself. The columns and pillars of the arches are made from polished Purbeck marble, famous for its use in the 'great churches' in England, such as Salisbury Cathedral and Westminster Abbey. The greater part of the interior, including the walls and arches are made from Portland stone, famous for its use in St Paul's Cathedral. Stone for both of these churches was also quarried locally.

The oak for the choir stalls, doors, organ case and roofs were taken from mature trees in the Eldon estate at Stowell Park in Gloucestershire.

The chancel steps, which raise the sanctuary above the crossing and nave, were made of crinoidal limestone from the Peak District in Derbyshire. The altar itself stands on a Carrara marble base from Tuscany, Italy.

== Organ ==
The church's organ is formed of three-manuals and was originally made in 1880 by Maley, Young & Oldknow of London. The organ keys are made of ivory, and the case and keys from oak. The pipes themselves are made from 'spotted' metal, an alloy of copper, tin, lead and zinc, and some of them were made by renowned French organ builder Cavaillé-Col.

The organ has 34 stops and 4 divisions, featuring several hundred pipes. The only visible part of the organ is in the north transept, with much of the mechanics in the brick-lined crypt below the chancel. The organ has been repaired and restored multiple times: once in 1904 by Gray and Davison where the entire instrument was cleaned; again in 1913, also by Gray and Davison, when it was cleaned again; in 1935, by George Osmond & Co of Taunton when the entire organ was overhauled; and lastly overhauled again between 1992 and 1993 by D.P. Thompson of Bridport. The last restoration was financed by the National Heritage Memorial Fund, the Pilgrim Trust, the Talbot Village Trust and Dorset County Council.

The British Institute of Organ Studies has awarded Grade I listed status to the organ in 2014 as part of the Historic Organ Listing Scheme.

== Bells ==
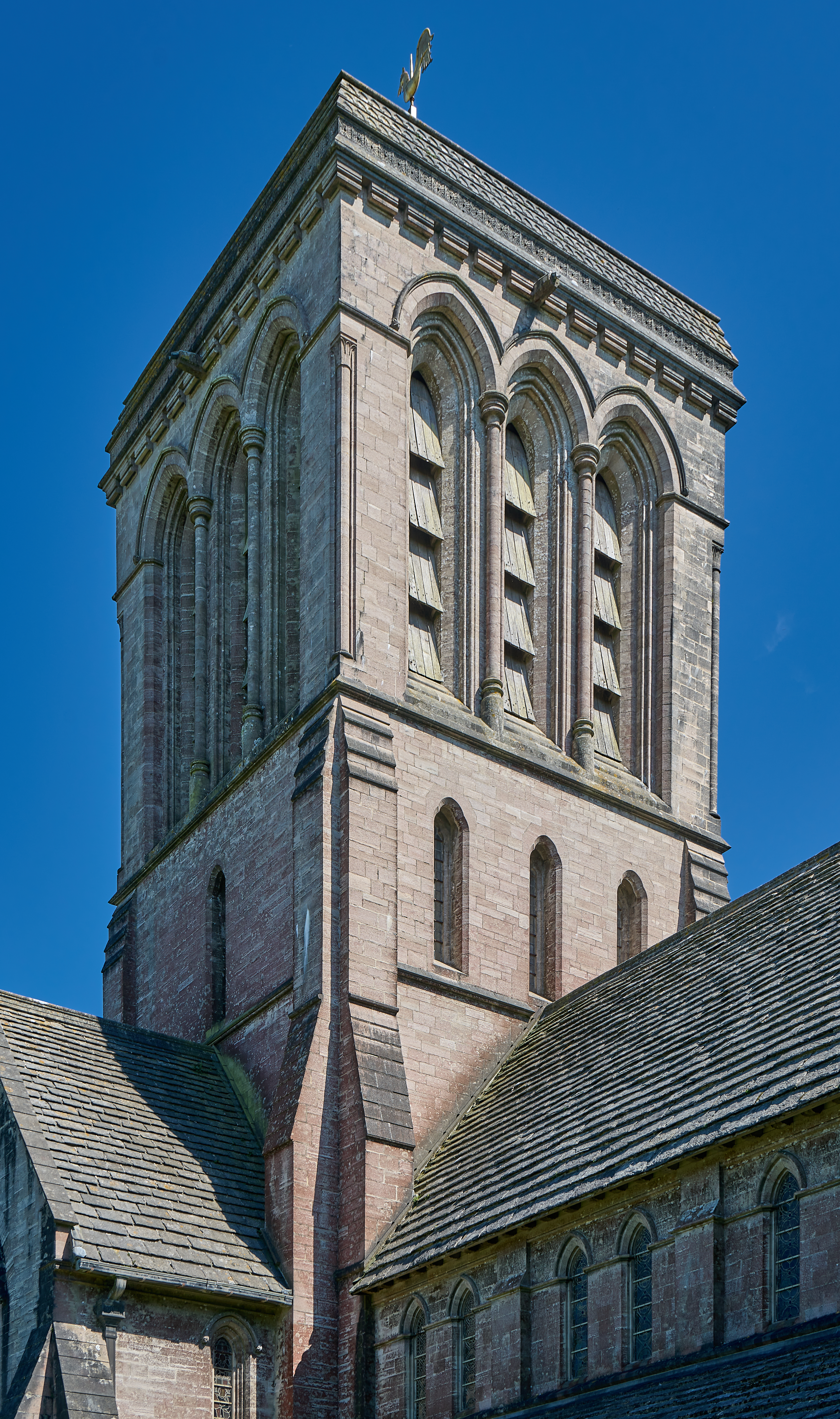
Detail on Street's substantial central tower, a local landmark

The large central tower was designed by Street for a ring of bells from the outset. The original peal of bells, like the church, was commissioned by the 3rd Earl of Eldon and were intended to match the scale of the church. John Taylor & Co of Loughborough were commissioned to cast the bells in 1878, and these were a ring of eight, with a tenor of 28 and a half hundredweight (1448 kilograms). The bells were hung in a new oak frame, which still holds the bells to this day.

On 24 July 1880, eight members of the Ancient Society of College Youths from the City of London were invited by Lord Eldon to attend the consecration of the church and bells, after which they attempted the first full peal on the bells. If they had been successful, this would have been the first full peal in Dorset, but the peal failed after some 3,500 changes.

The bells remained this way until the restoration of 1920–1921, when again at Lord Eldon's expense, the bells were completely overhauled by John Taylor & Co. All eight bells were lowered from the tower and sent to Taylor's foundry, where the treble (lightest) and tenor (heaviest) bells were recast, using the newly discovered "true-harmonic" tuning, which significantly improved the sound of the ring. The other six bells were retuned, and all eight bells received new fittings, including new cast iron headstocks, gudgeons, ball bearings and clappers. They were then rehung in the original frame. This new tenor bell, which is still the present incarnation of the bell, now weighs just under 27 hundredweight (1366 kilograms) and is tuned to D.

In 1983, serious problems were found with the bell frame, which at that time had just passed its 100th anniversary of construction, the massive oak supporting beams underneath it and the bell fittings themselves. Restoration work began in 1984 and lasted through to 1989. This restoration work involved John Taylor & Co returning to lift all the bells from their bearings to clean them, and generally renovate all the fittings, which were becoming worn, and making the bells difficult to ring. The frame was stabilised, beginning with volunteer ringers from Wimborne Minster, who inserted 20 vertical steel tie rods through the frame, rebushing the clappers. The decayed support beams were repaired or replaced.

In the late 1990s, thanks to a benefaction by Ron Pocklington, a ringer from Swanage, an order was placed to augment the bells to ten with the addition of two treble bells. To prepare for this, the Swanage ringers added further steel bracing was added to the original oak frame, the ground pulleys for the bell ropes were replaced, wooden wedges were removed from the frame, and steel foundation beams were added. A new steel upper frame was constructed by Nicholson Engineering of Bridport above the oak frame, resting on the new foundation beams, to house one of the new treble bells and one of the existing bells.

The new bells were cast and tuned by John Taylor & Co in 2000, and hung by Nicholson's. To accommodate the new bells, the original second bell, now the fourth after the addition of the two new bells, and the new second bell, were hung in the new upper frame. The new treble bell and the original treble bell (now the third after the addition) were hung in the original oak frame. They were the first (and so far only) ring of ten bells on the Isle of Purbeck and are the fourth heaviest ring in Dorset, after only Sherborne Abbey, Wimborne Minster and Christchurch Priory.

Since then, the bells have had no major attention. They are well regarded by ringers nationwide for the quality of their tone, and the summer months see frequent visiting bands.

== Gallery ==
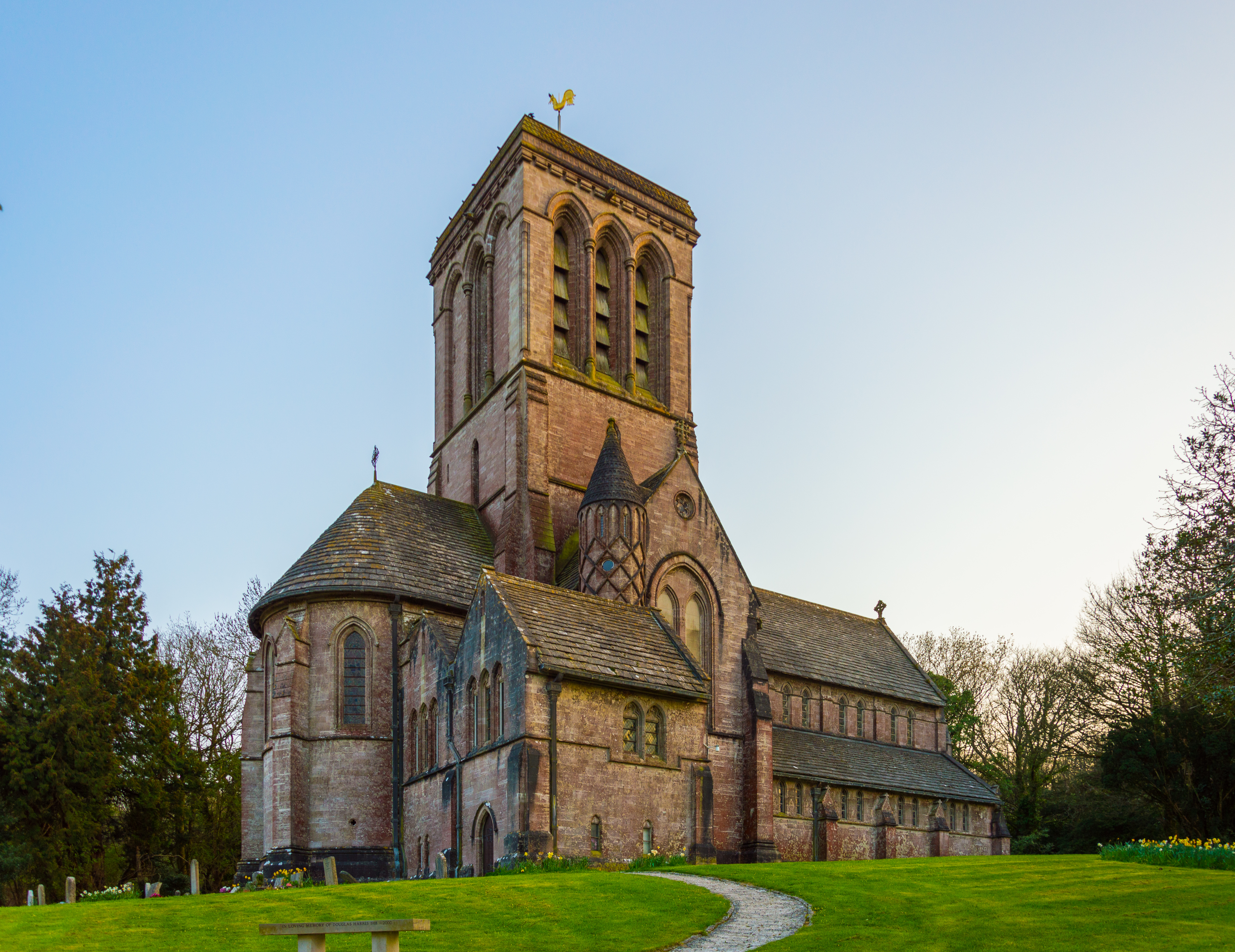
View of church from NE

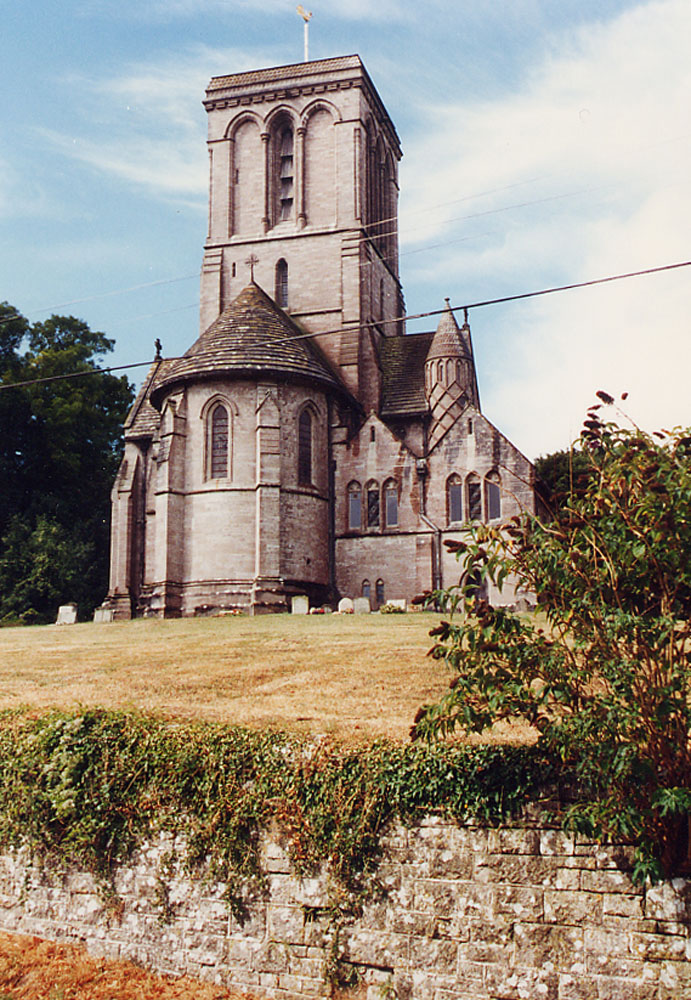
View of eastern end and apse

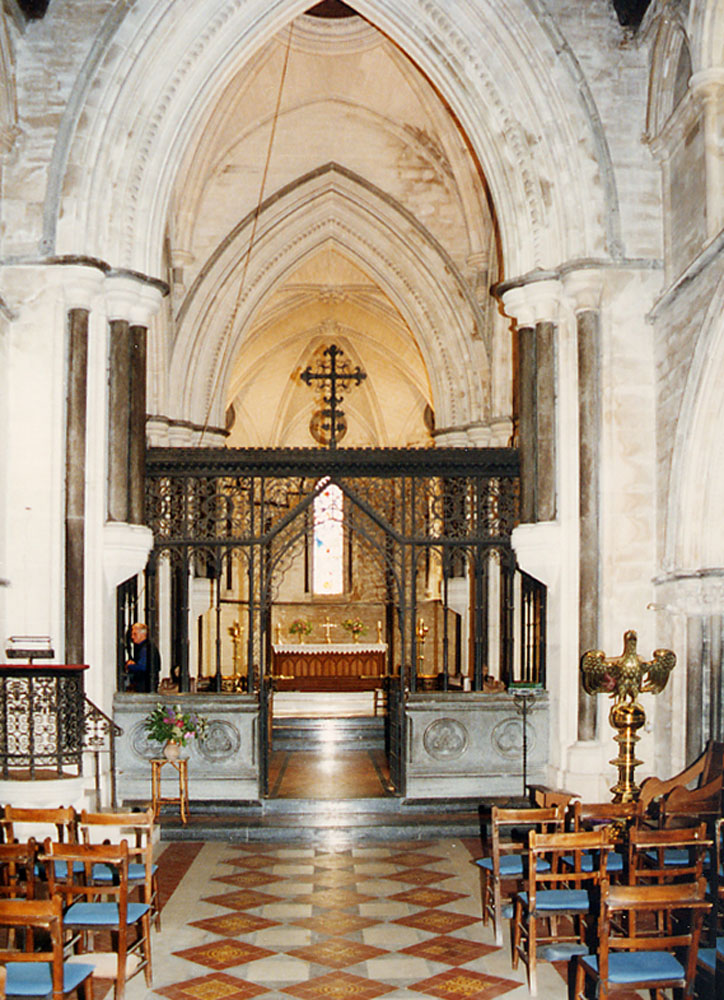
Nave and crossing

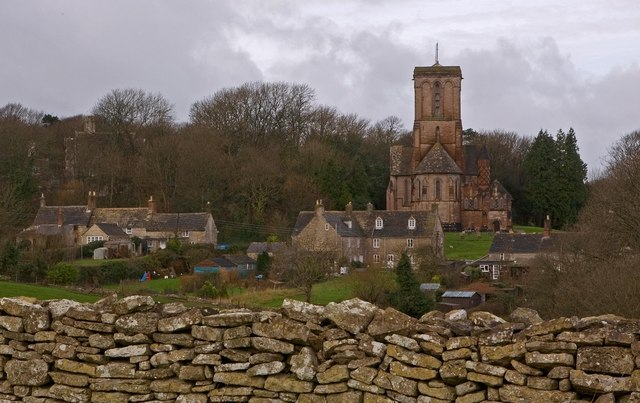
View from the east over the village

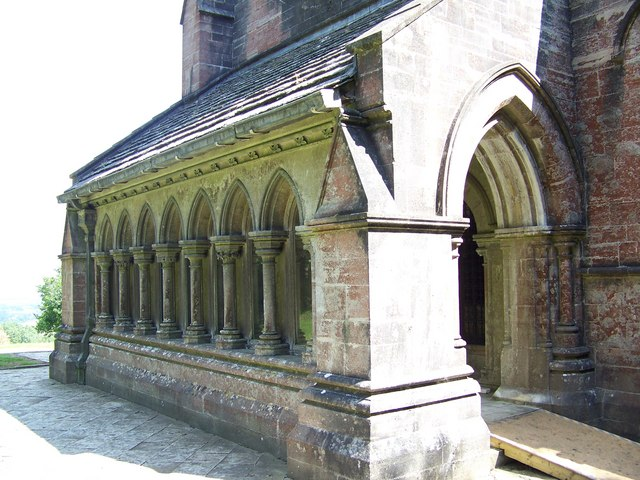
Porch and narthex

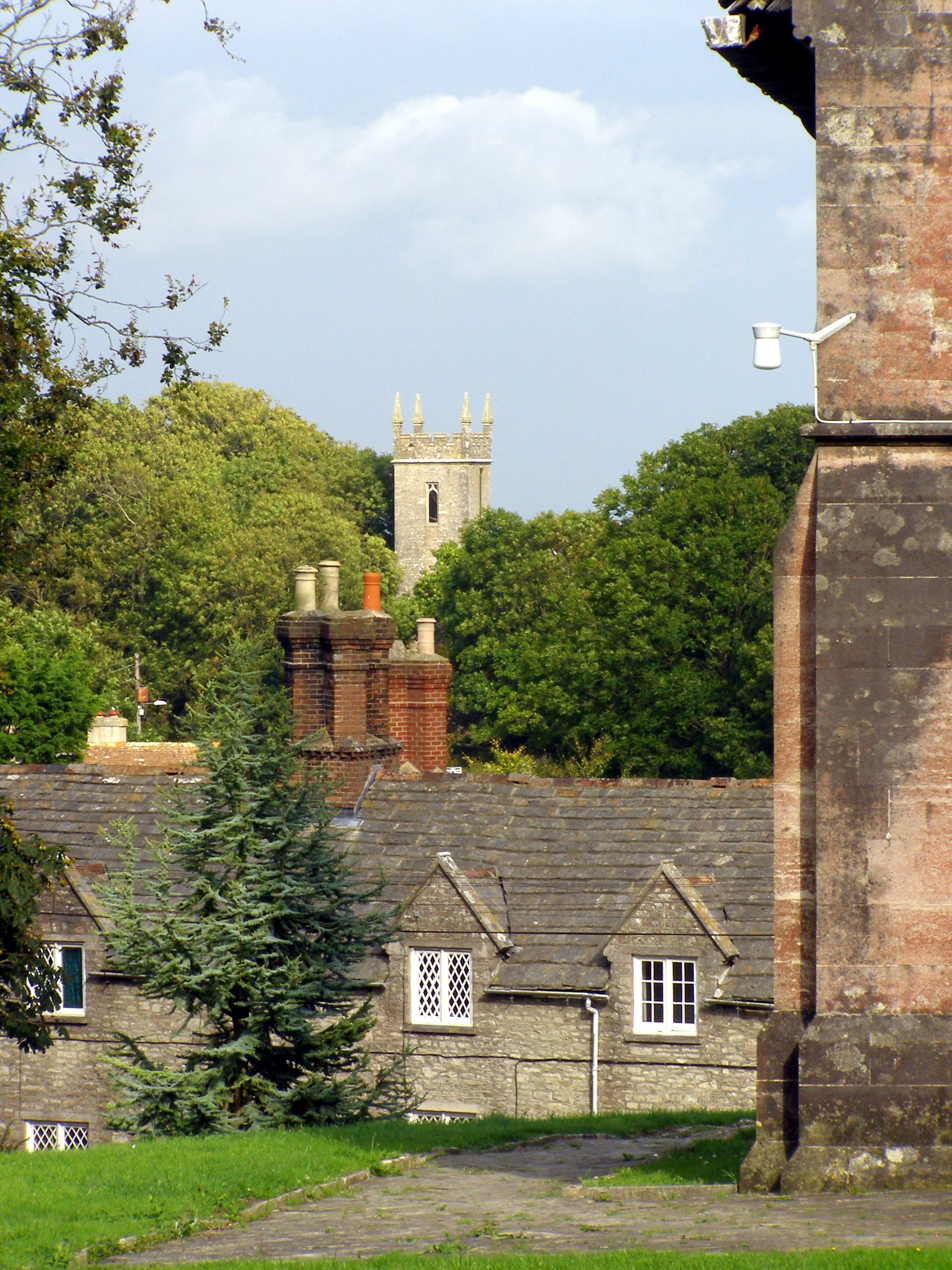
View of old church from the new one
