= Steeple, Dorset =

Hamlet in Dorset, England

Coordinates: 50.6294°N 2.1271°W

Steeple
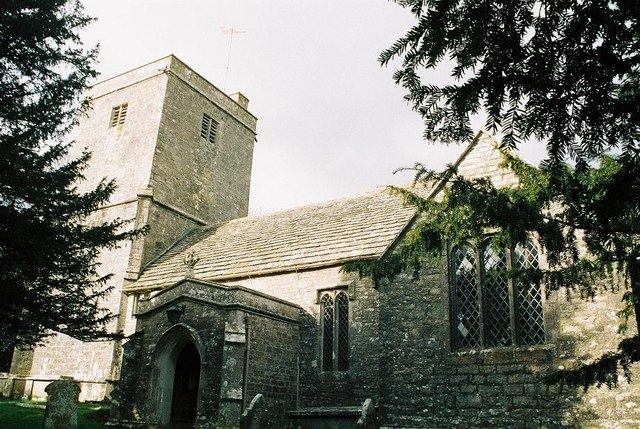
- Steeple parish church

- Location within Dorset
- Population: 60 (2013 estimate)
- OS grid reference: SY910812
- Civil parish: Steeple with Tyneham
- Unitary authority: Dorset
- Ceremonial county: Dorset
- Region: South West
- Country: England
- Sovereign state: United Kingdom
- Post town: WAREHAM
- Postcode district: BH20
- Dialling code: 01929
- Police: Dorset
- Fire: Dorset and Wiltshire
- Ambulance: South Western
- UK Parliament: South Dorset

Steeple is a hamlet and former civil parish, now in the civil parish of Steeple with Tyneham, in the English county of Dorset. It is situated 8 miles (13 km) west of the coastal resort town of Swanage at the foot of Ridgeway Hill. In 2013 the estimated population of the civil parish was 60. The civil parish was abolished on 1 April 2014 and merged with Tyneham to form Steeple with Tyneham.

The Gerrard family of Longhide were the principal landowners here from the fourteenth to the sixteenth century; the lands then passed by inheritance to the Napier family.

The ancient Norman church of Steeple, dedicated to St Michael and All Angels, lacks a steeple. It has a coat of arms engraved in stone in the porch and another painted in scarlet of the roof interior that is precisely the same as George Washington's coat of arms, showing stars and stripes.

The Washington arms is quartered with those of the squires of Steeple village, the Lawrence family, who are allied with the Washingtons by the marriage of one of its sons, Edmund Lawrence, to Agnes de Wessington in 1390.

The flag of the US capital hangs inside the church, presented on 25 July 1977 by Walter E Washington, Mayor of Washington DC from 2 January 1975 to 2 January 1979.

On the highest local point of the nearby Purbeck Ridge is an 18th-century folly built by the former owner of Creech Grange and known as Grange Arch. Today it is a Grade II listed building owned by the National Trust.
