= South Purbeck =

Region of Southern England

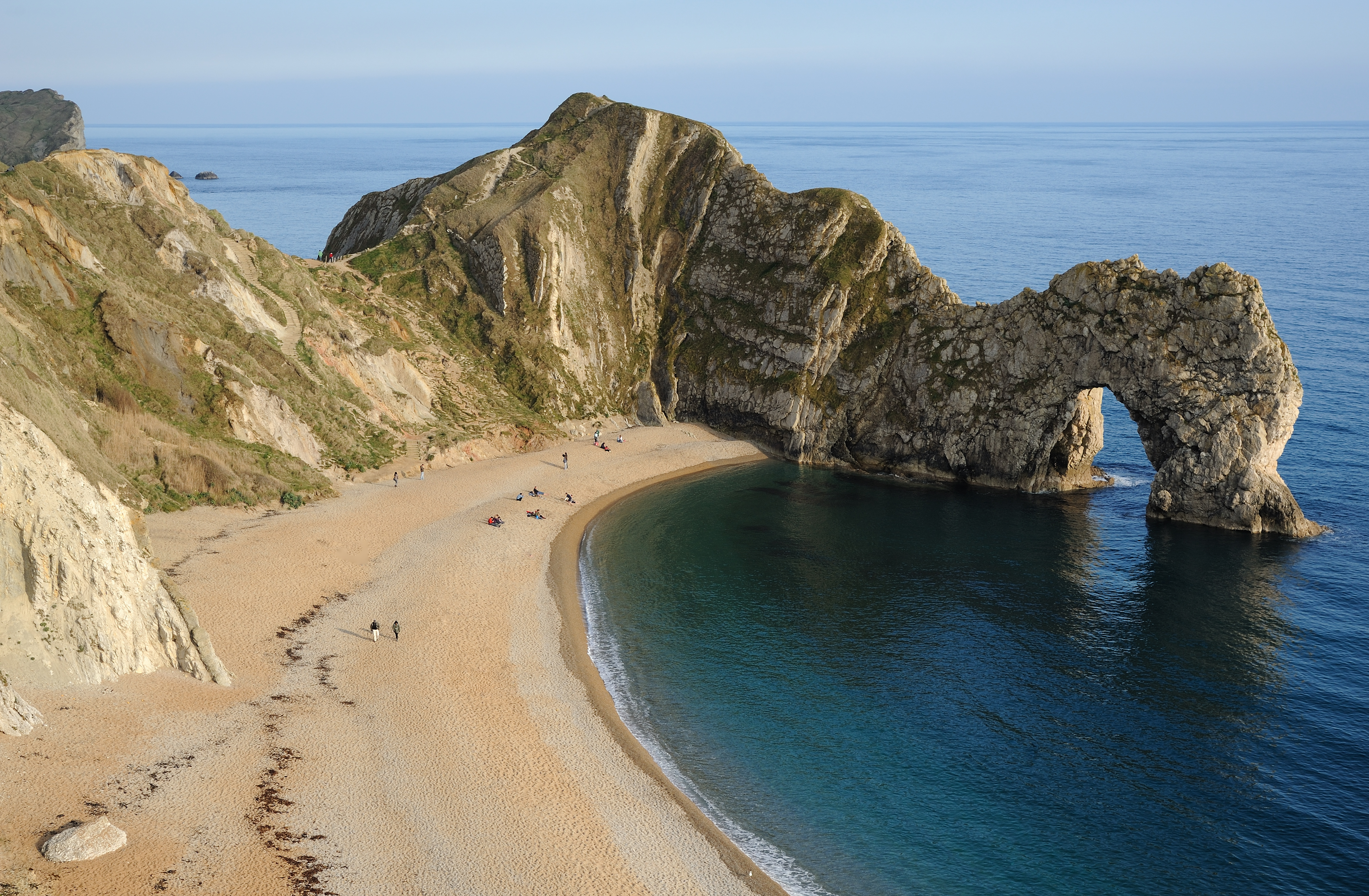
Durdle Door - on the Jurassic Coast in South Purbeck

South Purbeck is a natural region on the south coast of England. It lies wholly within the county of Dorset and forms part of the Jurassic Coast, a World Heritage Site, as well as lying entirely within the Dorset AONB.

South Purbeck is a National Character Area, No. 136, as defined by the UK's natural environment body, Natural England. They describe the area as a "compact, but highly diverse landscape" that encompasses the southern part of the Isle of Purbeck and the coastal strip to the west, running from Swanage Bay via Lulworth Cove to Ringstead Bay. To the west of the area, along the coast, lie the Weymouth Lowlands and to the north are the Dorset Heaths.

The area is geographically varied, comprising the steep chalk ridge of the Purbeck Hills, the gently undulating Corfe and Swan Vales, the coastal slope at Kimmeridge, the seaward-dipping limestone plateau and rolling chalk downlands around Chaldon Hill.
