= Ridgeway Hill =

Hill in Dorset, England

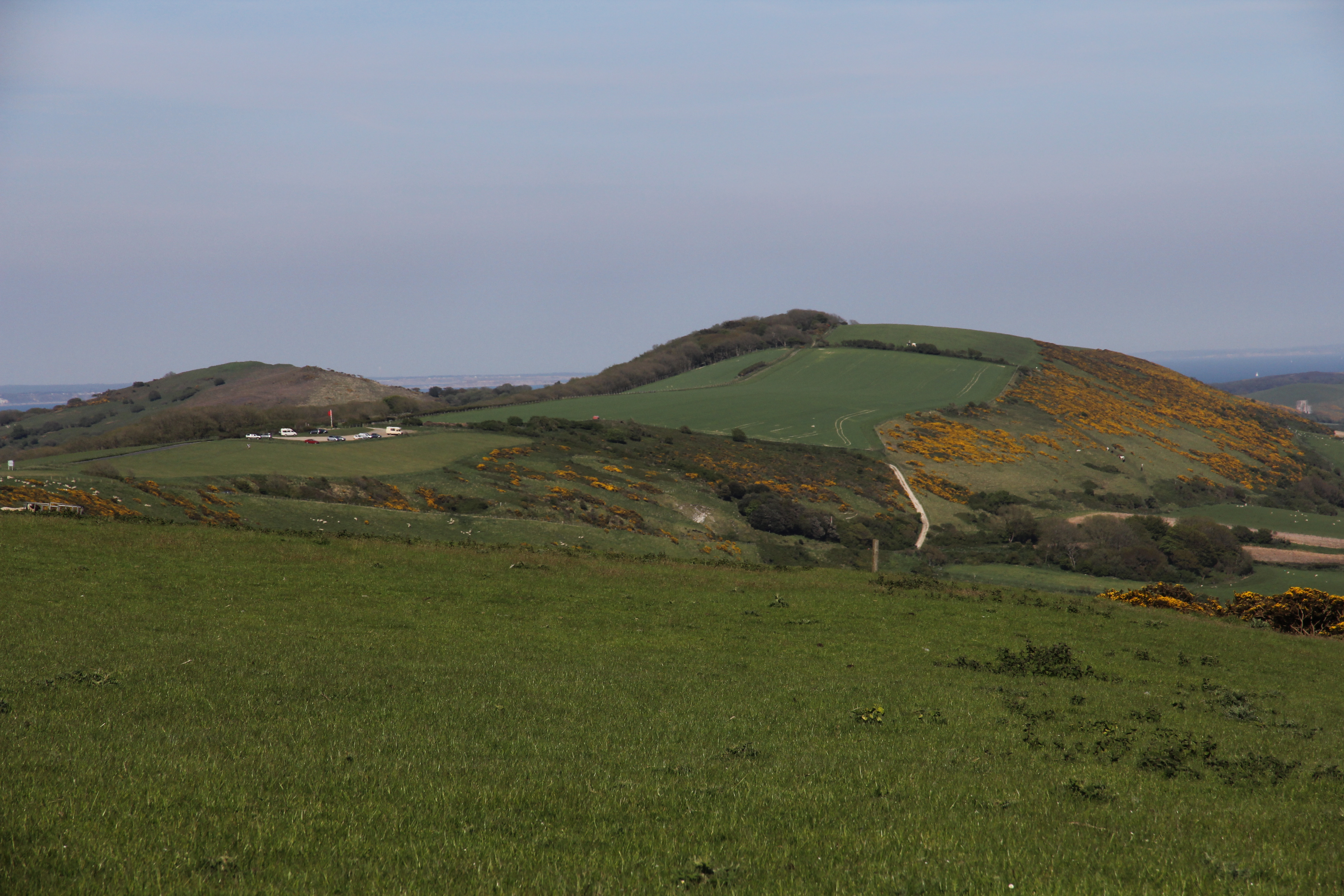
- Ridgeway Hill (right) on the Purbeck Ridge, Dorset, seen from Povington Hill to the west

Highest point
- Elevation: 199 m (653 ft)
- Prominence: 107 m (351 ft)
- Parent peak: Swyre Head
- Listing: HuMP
- Coordinates: 50°38′09″N 2°07′20″W

Geography
- Location: Dorset, England
- Parent range: Purbeck Hills
- OS grid: SY914817
- Topo map(s): OS Landranger 195; Explorer 15E

Ridgeway Hill, also referred to as Grange Hill or Steeple Hill, is the third highest point of the Purbeck Hills in the county of Dorset standing at 199 metres (653 ft), is one of the only hills with a prominence of over a hundred metres, HuMPs, in the county. Near the top of the hill is an 18th-century folly known as Grange Arch, built by the former owner of Creech Grange, Denis Bond. On the eastern spur of the hill is Stonehill Down which is now a nature reserve. There are also good views of Swyre Head on the Jurassic Coast.

== Location ==
The hill lies about 1¾ miles (2.8 km) from Kimmeridge Bay on Dorset's Jurassic Coast and 2.8 miles (4.5 km) west of Corfe Castle. The hamlet of Steeple lies at its southern foot. To the west is the better-known, but slightly lower, Povington Hill above the abandoned village of Tyneham. The Lulworth Ranges lies between Ridgeway Hill and the coast.

There is a free car park on the ridgeline west of the summit just off the Grange Hill road known as Steeple Hill Car Park, from where there are panoramic views of the area.

== Gallery ==
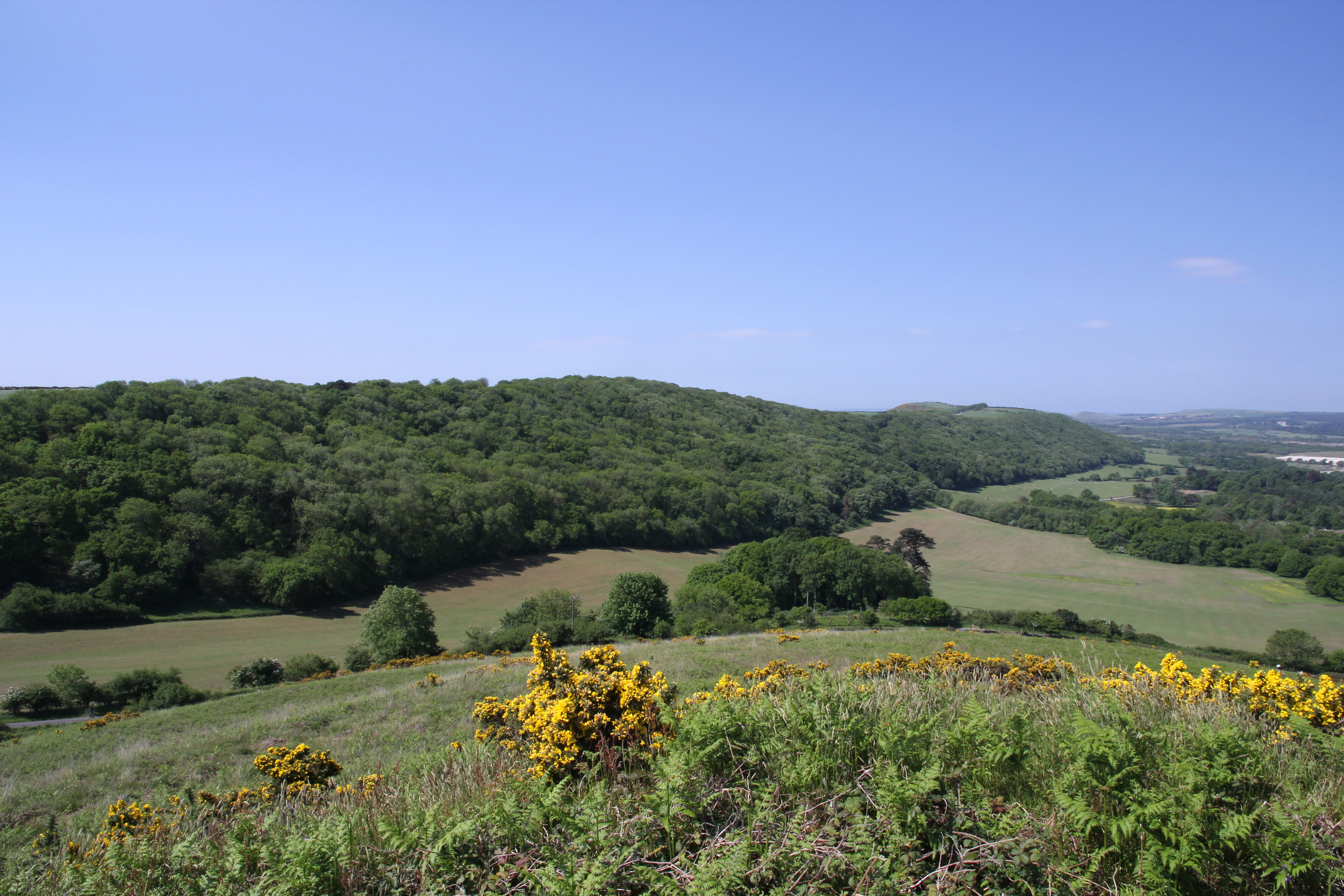
The long wooded back of Ridgeway Hill seen from Creech Barrow Hill to the North East

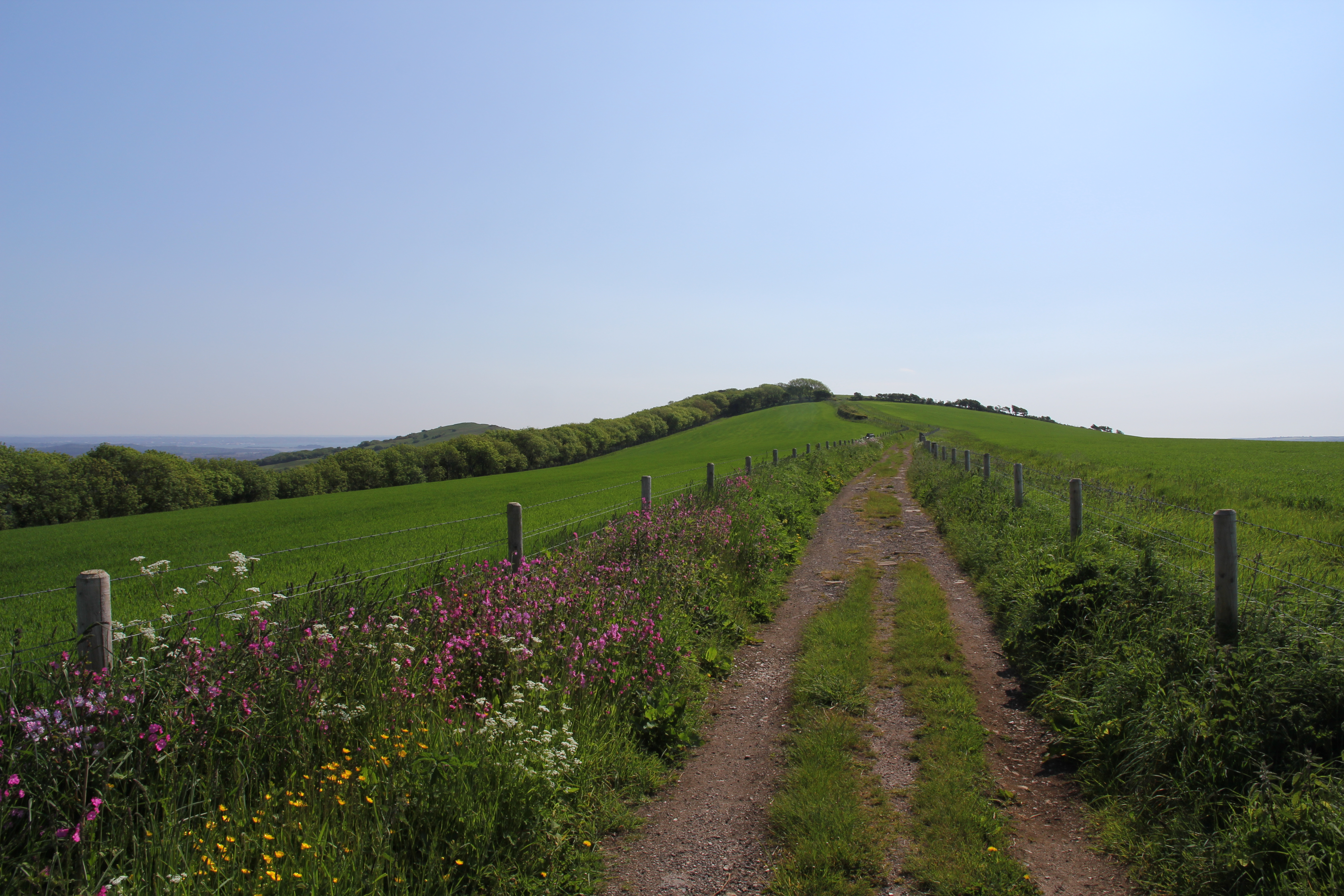
The footpath up the western slope of Ridgeway Hill from the car park
