= Grange Arch =

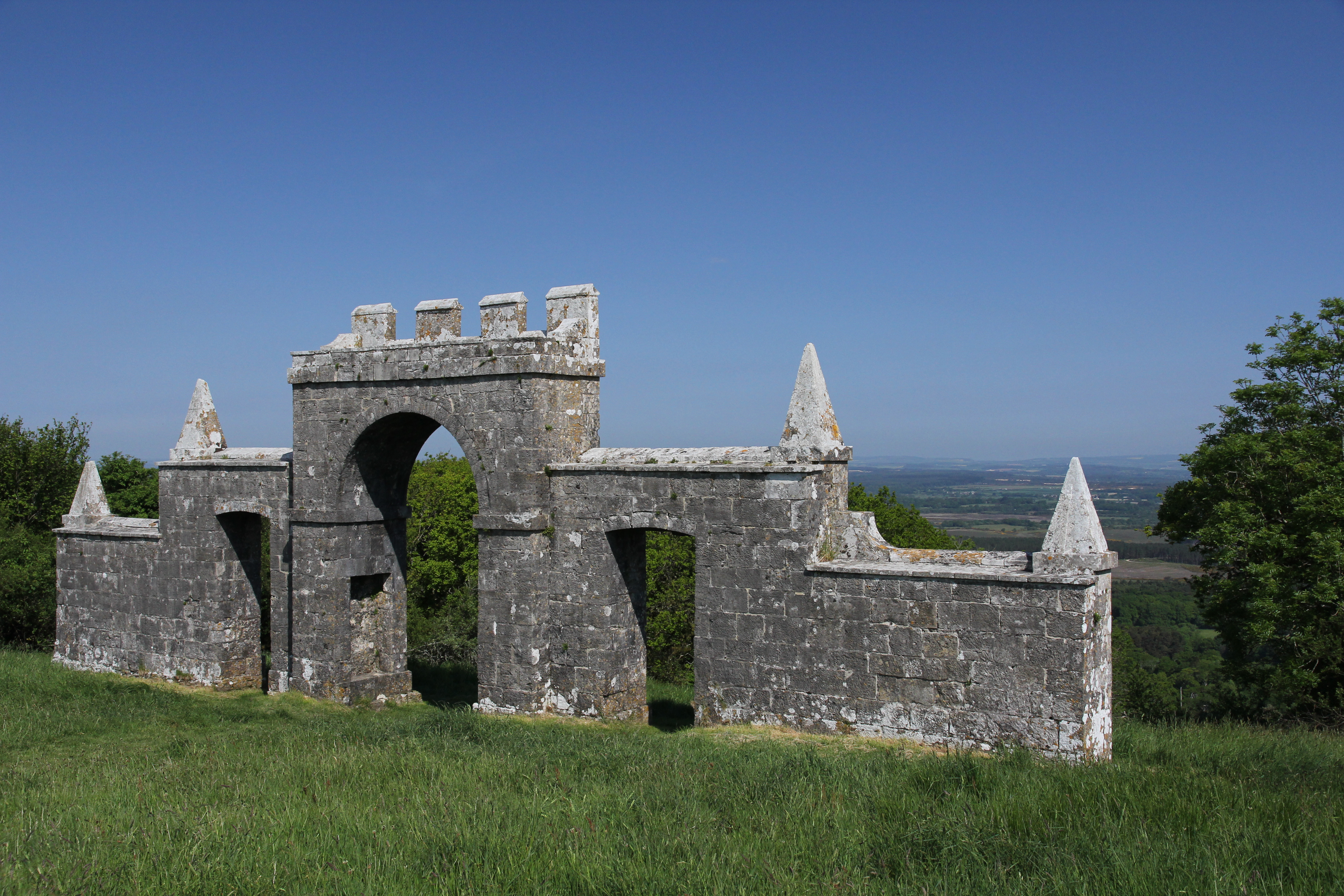
- Grange Arch on Ridgeway Hill
- Interactive map of the Grange Arch area
- Alternative names: Creech Folly

General information
- Type: Folly
- Location: Ridgeway Hill, Dorset, UK, United Kingdom
- Coordinates: 50°38′08″N 2°07′30″W
- Elevation: ~198 m
- Client: Denis Bond

Grange Arch, also known as Creech Folly, is an 18th-century folly that is located near the second highest point of the Purbeck Hills, Ridgeway Hill (199 m), in Dorset. It lies within the parish of Steeple.

The folly, which was built by a former owner of Creech Grange, Denis Bond, in 1746, is built in the form of a triple arch of ashlar stone. The central archway is surmounted by battlements and flanked by stone walls with smaller doorway arches.

Today the arch is owned by the National Trust. English Heritage have designated it a Grade II* listed building.

== See also ==
- Sham Castle
