= Kingston, Purbeck =

Village in Dorset, England

Coordinates: 50.6162°N 2.0628°W

Kingston
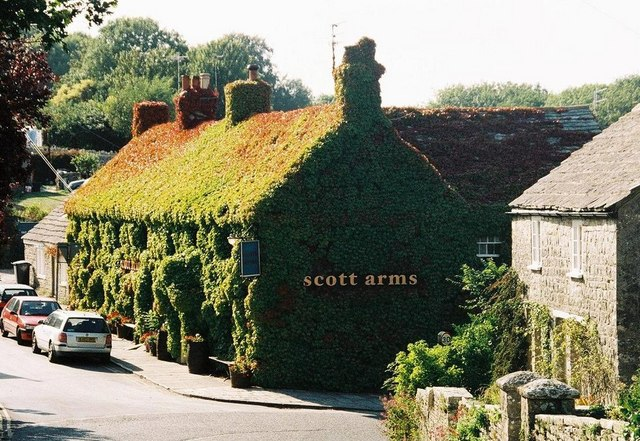
- Kingston

- Location within Dorset
- OS grid reference: SY957796
- Civil parish: Corfe Castle
- Unitary authority: Dorset
- Ceremonial county: Dorset
- Region: South West
- Country: England
- Sovereign state: United Kingdom
- Post town: SWANAGE
- Postcode district: BH19
- Dialling code: 01929
- Police: Dorset
- Fire: Dorset and Wiltshire
- Ambulance: South Western
- UK Parliament: South Dorset

Kingston is a small village on the Isle of Purbeck in the county of Dorset in southern England.

== Location ==
Kingston is situated about two miles south of Corfe Castle and five miles west of Swanage. The village of Kingston is situated on a hill near Swyre Head, the highest point of the Purbeck Hills. The village is surrounded by woods and stands at a height of over 400 ft (120 Metres) above sea level and can be seen from far away.

Kingston lies within the civil parish of Corfe Castle. The parish forms part of the Dorset unitary authority area.

== History ==
The village is notable because it has two churches. Since the 12th century, up until 1877, Kingston had been a chapelry of Corfe Castle. A chapel stood on the east side of the village and it was served by the Rector of Corfe Castle or his assistant.

In 1833 John Scott, the first Earl of Eldon, (later Lord Chancellor Eldon) replaced the chapel, at his own expense, with the present church building standing on the site. It was designed by his son-in-law, George Repton, and largely followed the ground plan of the replaced chapel, embodying most of the old building material. The church was surrounded by many graves. The first Earl and his wife are buried in the churchyard. The old church remained in use as the church hall for many years, later it became disused and is now a private residence. Many of the gravestones were transferred to a separate graveyard, while others were used for paving or broken up.

The other church, St James's Church, is quite elaborate. It was built in 1874, completed in 1880, by the third Earl of Eldon, the architect was George Edmund Street (1824–1881). St James's Church resembles a miniature of an early English cathedral. It is a cruciform building, with an apse, central tower and narthex, built throughout of Purbeck stone. Its tower dominates the landscape. The tower, which is somewhat disproportionate in size to the rest of the church, was made large enough to contain a full ring of eight bells, which were cast and installed by John Taylor & Co., of Loughborough, in 1880. Two more bells were added in 2000 to make a ring of 10 bells. Inside the clustered pillars and other details are made of Purbeck marble, quarried from Lord Eldon's estate and worked by his own craftsmen. It did not replace the existing church immediately and in effect for over forty years it was the private chapel of the Eldon family.

In April 1921 Lord Eldon conveyed the church and churchyard to the Church Commissioners. On 11 October 1921 they were consecrated by the Rt. Rev. Bishop Jocelyne. In January 1922 the new church substituted the old one by the Church Commissioners.

There was also a Wesleyan Methodist chapel, built in 1861, at the foot of Kingston Hill. The building still stands and now it is a private residence.

The first school in Kingston was established on 24 September 1786. The school house for up to 100 children with residence for the school master, was erected in 1856, in memory of the Earl and Countess of Eldon, by their children. The old school house building is now a private residence.

The village pub dates from 1787. Originally it was known as the ‘New Inn’. Its name was changed to the Eldon Arms in the early 19th century. After the Second World War the name was changed to The Scott Arms.

== Gallery ==
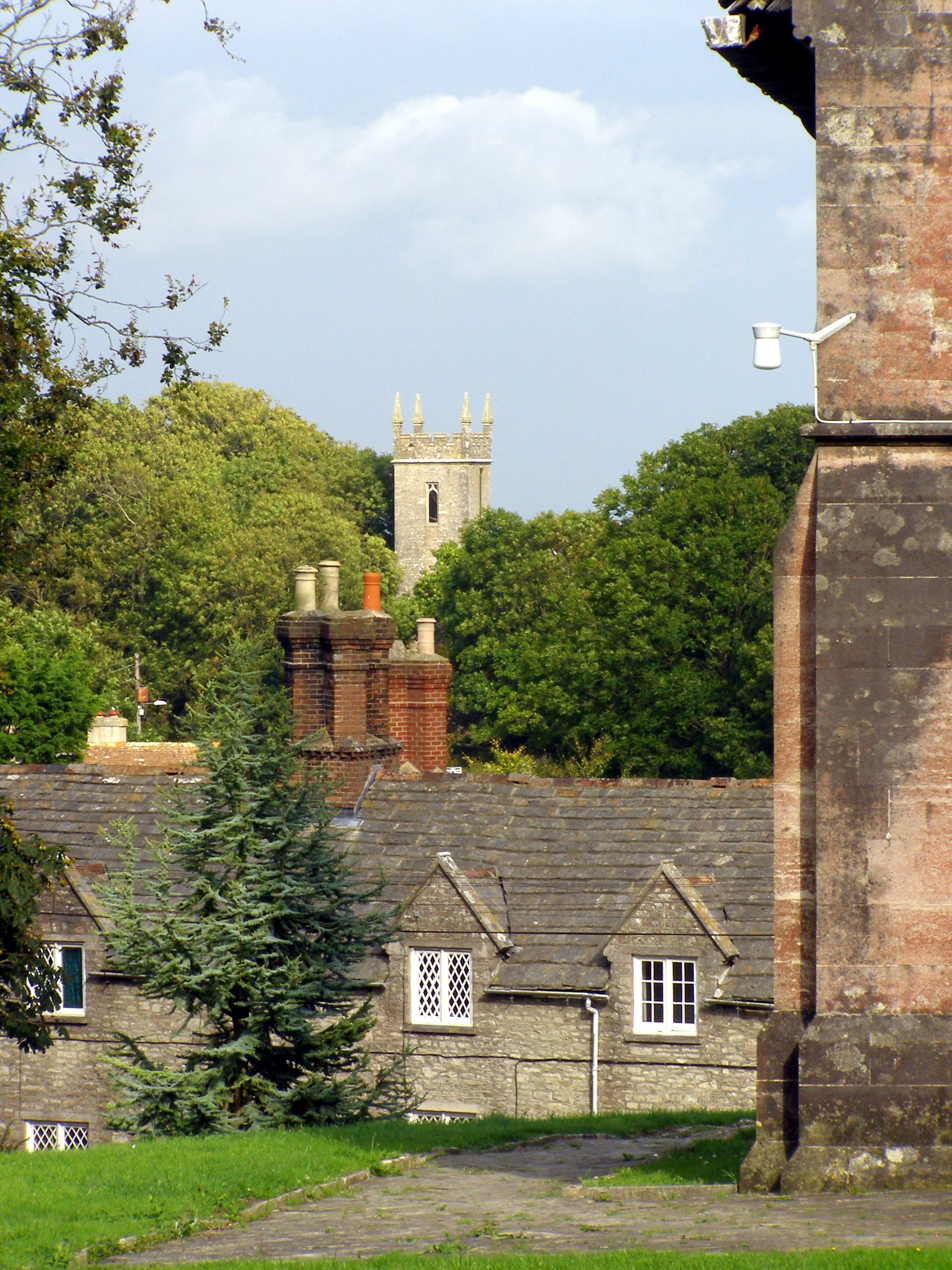
The tower of the old church

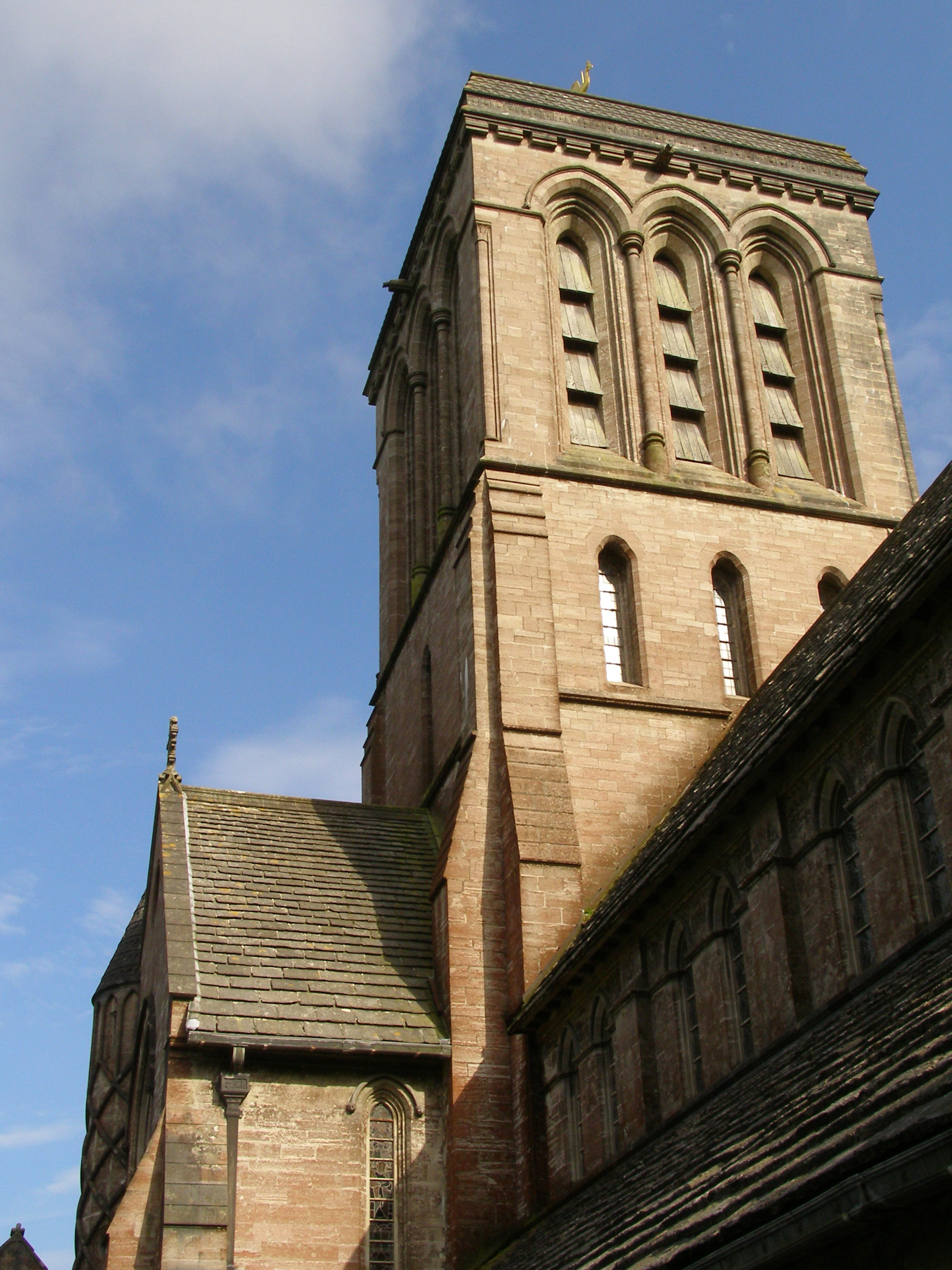
The tower of the new St James's Church
