= Creech Grange =

Country house in Steeple, Dorset, England

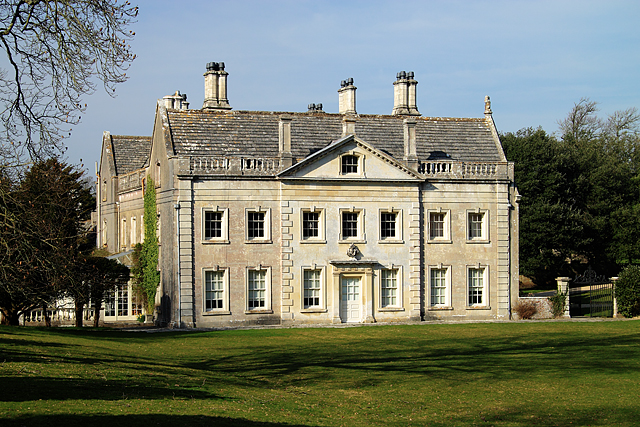
- Creech Grange
- Interactive map of the Creech Grange area

General information
- Type: Country house, manor house
- Location: Steeple, Dorset, UK, United Kingdom
- Coordinates: 50°38′25″N 2°07′38″W
- Construction started: 1540
- Completed: 1559
- Client: Sir Oliver Lawrence

Creech Grange is a country house in Steeple, south of Wareham in Dorset at the foot of the Purbeck Hills. Historic England designate it as a Grade I listed building. The park and gardens are Grade II* listed in the National Register of Historic Parks and Gardens.

== History ==
The house was built by Sir Oliver Lawrence (1507–1559), who acquired the land from the former Bindon Abbey, near Wool, after the Dissolution of the Monasteries in 1539. Lawrence was the brother-in-law of Henry VIII's Lord Chancellor, Thomas Wriothesley, 1st Earl of Southampton.

Lawrence was an ancestor of the first American president, George Washington, and the joint arms of the two families - the stars and stripes of Washington's signet ring and the American flag - appear in memorials at Steeple and Affpuddle.

Creech Grange was sold to Nathaniel Bond in 1691, and the family still hold their Purbeck estates. It was Thomas Bond who in Stuart times laid out the London Street over fields of swamp and refuse tips and lost a fortune in the process.

Only fragments remain of the original house built by Lawrence before his death in 1559, partly because it was damaged by fire by the Parliamentarians during the English Civil War, and finally because in 1846 the entire front was taken down and rebuilt in the Tudor style.

In 1746, Denis Bond erected a folly known as Grange Arch on the highest local point on the Purbeck Ridge, Ridgeway Hill (199 m). The folly is now owned by the National Trust. Creech Grange is not to be confused with neighbouring East Creech Manor that was in the possession of Walter Le Franke in 1224 and passed down through his family to Mary Franke in 1637, who married Edmund Hayter (d. 1657), and was sold out of that family in 1770.

== View ==
There are panoramic views from nearby Creech Barrow Hill. Though part of the Purbeck Hills, Creech Barrow stands out, detached. The church tower of Lady St Mary in the old town of Wareham stands proud. Poole Harbour assumes dominance as the view moves north-easterly, its southern shore dominated by the deep green of Rempstone Forest. After the blur of the Poole/Bournemouth conurbation, the ruins of Corfe Castle conclude the sweep as the eastern view disappears into the Purbeck Ridge.

== SSSI ==
Part of the estate is a 0.1-hectare (0.25-acre) biological Site of Special Scientific Interest, notified in 1977. The outbuildings are an important roosting site for Greater Horseshoe Bats.

== Gallery ==
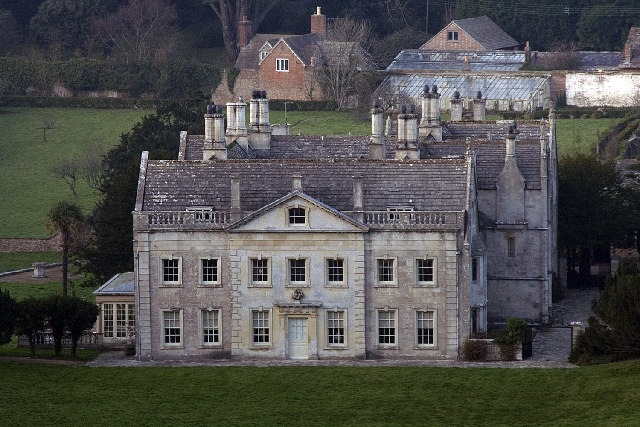
Creech Grange near Wareham, Dorset

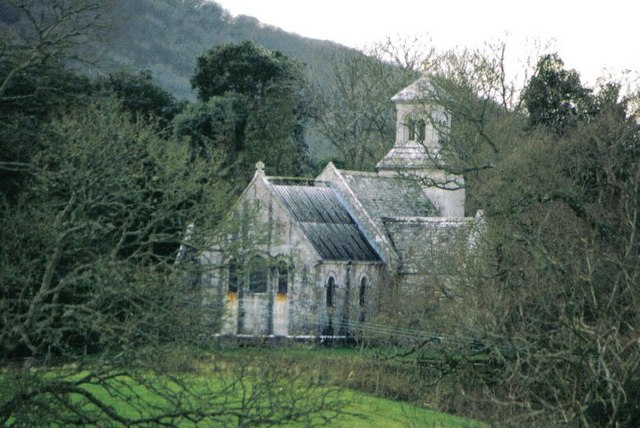
Creech: chapel of St. John

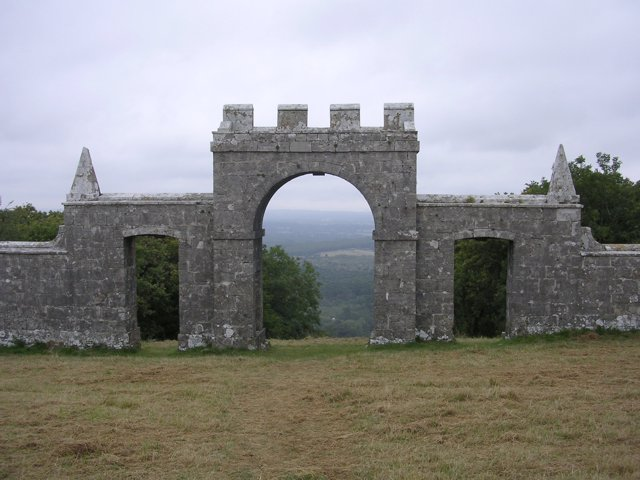
Grange Arch on the Purbeck ridgeway

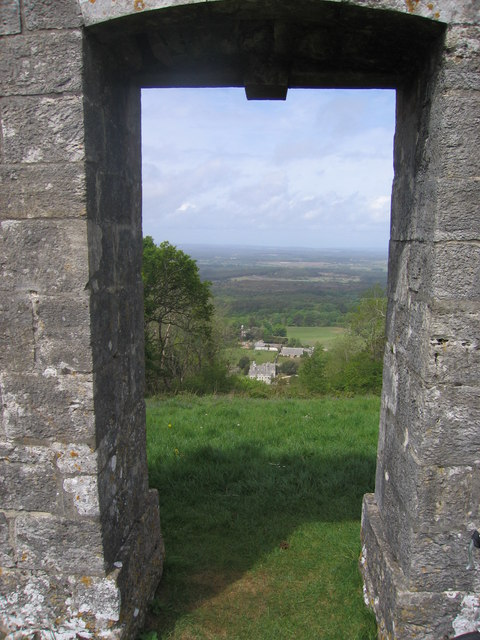
Creech Grange from the Arch
