= Nine Barrow Down =

Coordinates: 50.62960°N 1.99005°W

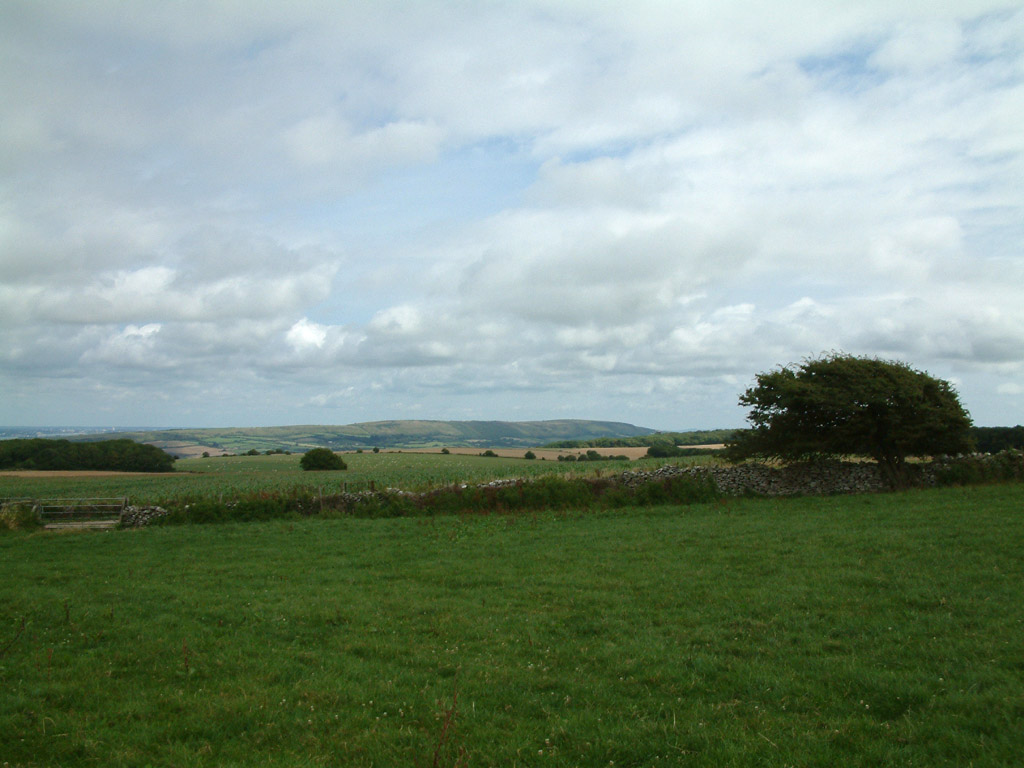
- Nine Barrow Down from the north of Swyre Head

Highest point
- Elevation: 199 m (653 ft)
- Prominence: c. 152 metres (499 ft)
- Parent peak: Lewesdon Hill
- Listing: Marilyn

Geography
- Location: Purbeck Hills, England
- OS grid: SZ008811
- Topo map(s): OS Landranger 195; Explorer 15E

Nine Barrow Down is an elongated hill forming the northern ridge of the Purbeck Hills on the Isle of Purbeck in Dorset, England. The chalk down is part of the extensive Southern England Chalk Formation. The eastern end of the ridge, which carries the highest point, is also sometimes known as Godlingston Hill. The col of the railway cutting at Harman's Cross means that it has sufficient relative height that it qualifies as a Marilyn.

The hill has views to the north across Poole Harbour. On a clear day it is possible to see as far as the Spinnaker Tower in Portsmouth. To the south is the other ridge of the Purbeck Hills including Swyre Head. To the south-east Swanage and its Bay can be seen.

Until recently the hill was topped with a trig point, but this has been removed by the farmer with the permission of Ordnance Survey: the trig point and its concrete base can be seen on its side just to the south of the bridleway. The highest point is within a field marked "No public access".

It is also the site for the 2 kW Heart South Coast Transmitter on 102.3 and for the NOW Digital Multiplexes.

== Ecology ==
Ecologically the ridge is largely calcareous grassland grazed by cattle, sheep and rabbits, with limited arable use.

== Archaeology ==
Along the ridge there are 18 Bronze Age bowl barrows collectively known as the Nine Barrow Down round barrow cemetery and a Neolithic long barrow. These have been collectively designated as a scheduled monument.
