= Dorset Heaths =

Designations

Ramsar Wetland
- Official name: Dorset Heathlands
- Designated: 1 October 1998
- Reference no.: 964

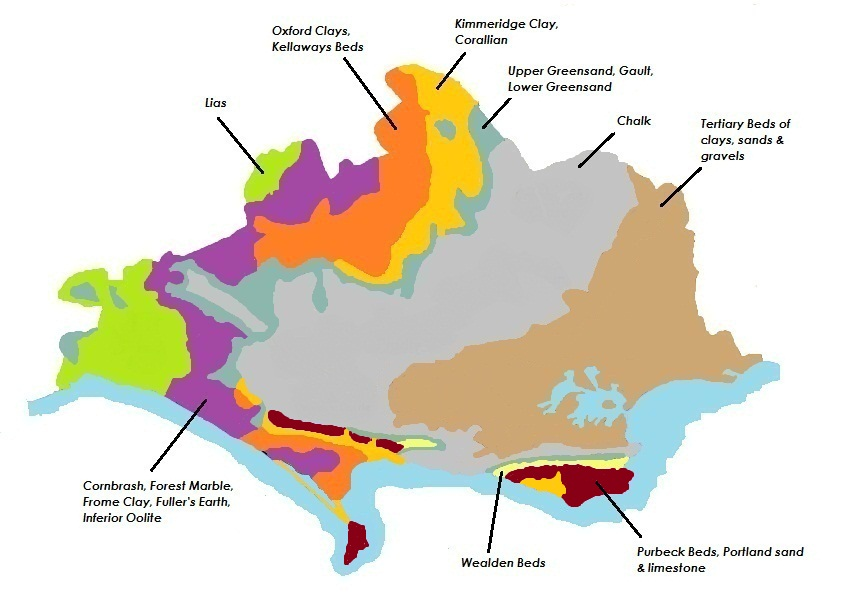
The Dorset Heaths coincide closely with the area of the "Tertiary Beds" (beige) in this geological map of Dorset

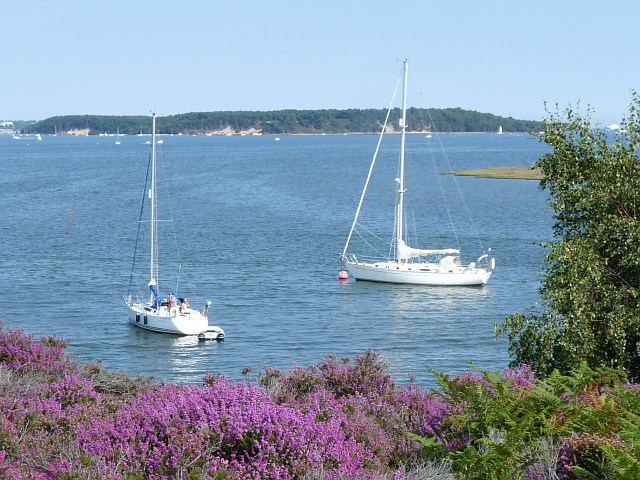
View across Poole Harbour from Arne looking towards Brownsea Island

The Dorset Heaths form an important area of heathland within the Poole Basin in southern England. Much of the area is protected.

== Extent ==
According to Natural England, who have designated the Dorset Heaths as National Character Area 135, the heathlands cover an area of 61,662 hectares, whose boundary runs from Bockhampton and Warmwell in the west via Wimborne Minster to Fordingbridge in the far northeast. It then turns southwards to Hengistbury Head, before following the coastline to Studland and Brownsea Island then finally heading westwards - north of South Purbeck (with the Purbeck Hills) and the Weymouth Lowlands - to the Warmwell area.

== Character ==
The character of the Dorset Heaths contrasts strongly with its neighbouring natural regions. Undulating lowland heath with heather, pines and gorse alternates with exposed, open, large-scale farmland, woodland and scrub. Blocks of conifers form locally prominent landmarks. Apart from the major Poole-Bournemouth-Christchurch conurbation on the coast, much of the area is sparsely populated with scattered settlements and a few small villages and towns. Valleys are flat-bottomed and open with floodplain pastures. There is an outer perimeter of low, rolling hills marking the transition to chalk downland.

== Geography ==
=== Topography ===
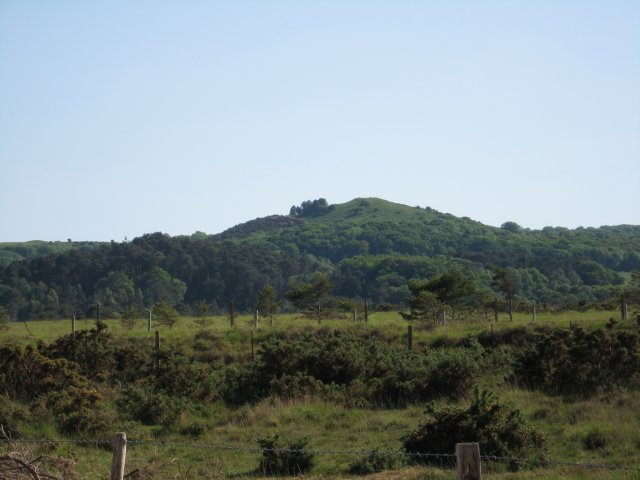
Creech Barrow Hill

The land within the Dorset Heaths rises to a maximum of 193 metres (633 ft) at Creech Barrow Hill, but the average height is just 32 metres (105 ft).

=== Rivers ===
Major rivers include the Frome, Stour, Moors, Piddle, Sherford, Allen, Corfe and Dorset Avon.

=== Main settlements ===
The largest settlement within the Dorset Heaths is the extensive South East Dorset conurbation, this includes the large towns of Poole, Bournemouth and Christchurch. Other significant Satellite towns are Wareham, Fordingbridge and Wimborne Minster. The total population for the NCA was 446,296 as of 2001 with an increase to 466,626 following the 2011 census.

== Protected areas ==
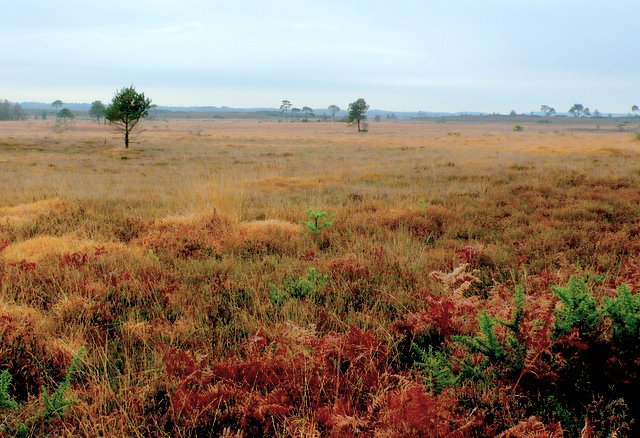
View over the north side of Holt Heath

The Dorset Heaths are home to a large number of protected areas including:

- Ramsar sites and Special Protection Areas: Dorset Heathlands SPA, Poole Harbour SPA, Avon valley SPA
- Special areas of conservation: Dorset Heaths SAC, Dorset Heaths (Purbeck & Wareham) & Studland Dunes SAC, Isle of Portland to Studland Cliffs SAC; River Avon SAC.
- National nature reserves: Studland and Godlingston Heath NNR, Holt Heath NNR; Hartland Moor NNR; Stoborough Heath NNR; Holton Heath NNR; Morden Bog NNR; Arne Reedbeds NNR.
