= Swyre Head =

Hill in Dorset, England

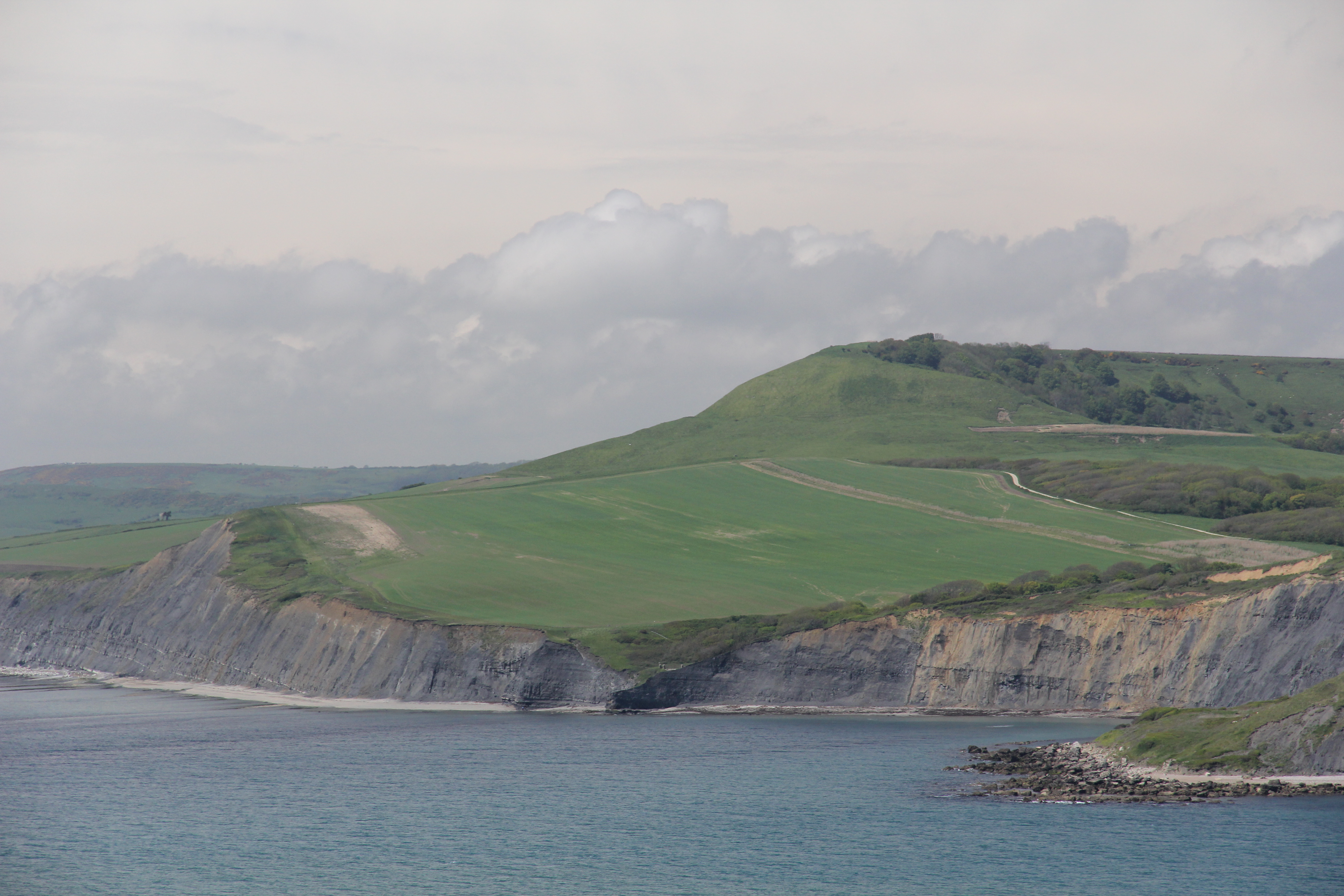
- Swyre Head, seen from the SW Coast Path on the W side of St Aldhelm's Head

Highest point
- Elevation: 208 m (682 ft)
- Prominence: 150 m (490 ft)
- Parent peak: Lewesdon Hill
- Listing: Marilyn
- Coordinates: 50.6058°N 2.0944°W

Geography
- Location: Purbeck Hills, England
- OS grid: SY934784
- Topo map(s): OS Landranger 195; Explorer 15E

Swyre Head is the highest point of the Isle of Purbeck in Dorset, on the south coast of England. The hill Swyre Head lies about 2 kilometres (1 mi) southwest of the village Kingston, about 5 kilometres (3 mi) south of Corfe Castle and 8 kilometres (5 mi) west of Swanage.

Although not very high, its relative height is such that it just misses qualification as a Marilyn. The hill consists of Jurassic Formations and is not part of the extensive Southern England Chalk Formation.

Swyre Head by Kingston should not be confused with another Dorset hill called Swyre Head, at an elevation of 98 metres (322 ft), on the coast, located at grid reference SY799805, to the west of Durdle Door. The two Swyre Heads are about four hours walk apart from each other; that is, 18 kilometres (11 mi).

The hill commands extensive views, including west past the Isle of Portland to Dartmoor, and east to the Isle of Wight, as well as north across the Purbeck Hills to Poole Harbour and the other Purbeck Marilyn, Nine Barrow Down. To the west, the folly of Clavell Tower can also be seen.

Set back about 800 metres (half a mile) from the coast, the hill is not on the South West Coast Path, but can be reached easily from the villages of Kingston or Kimmeridge.

The hill has a trig point marked as 203 metres on Ordnance Survey maps, but a tumulus, now fully grassed over, forms the highest point, 208 metres (682 ft) above sea level.

== Gallery ==
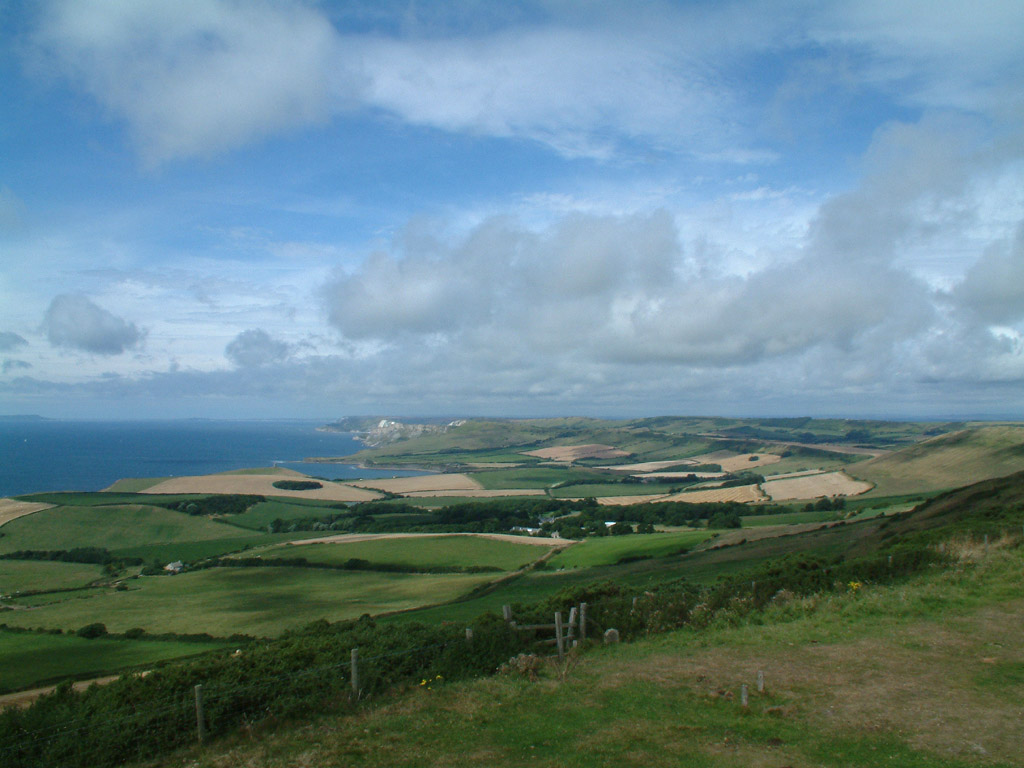
View west from the summit of Swyre Head

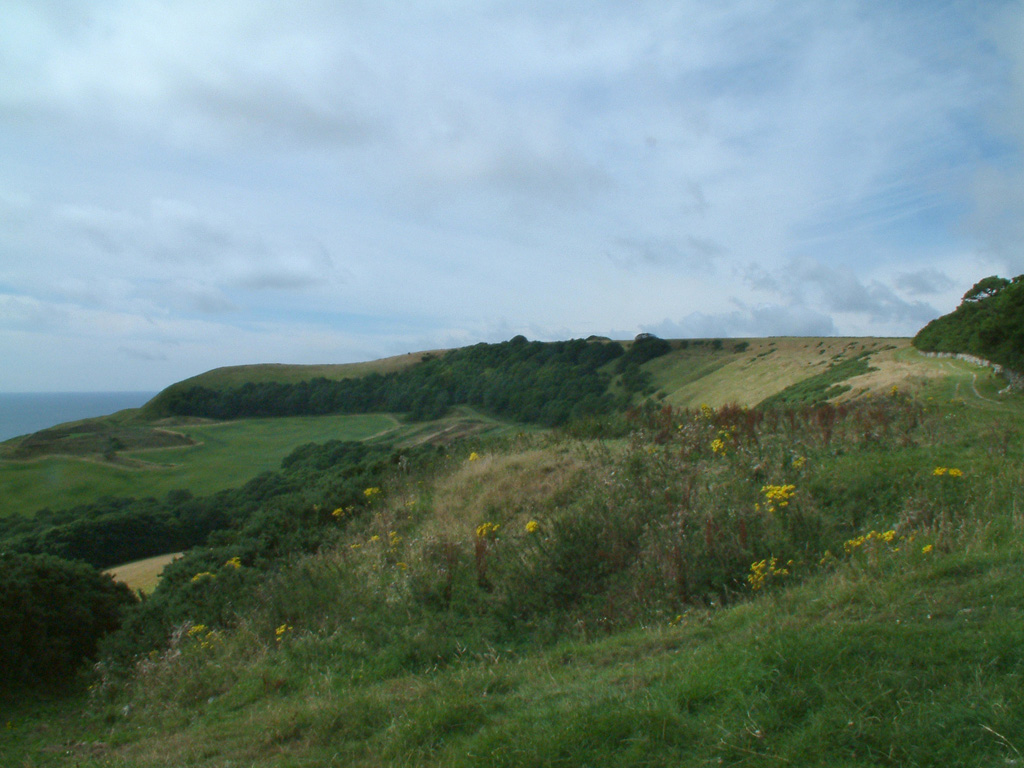
Swyre Head from the north-east
