= Creech Barrow Hill =

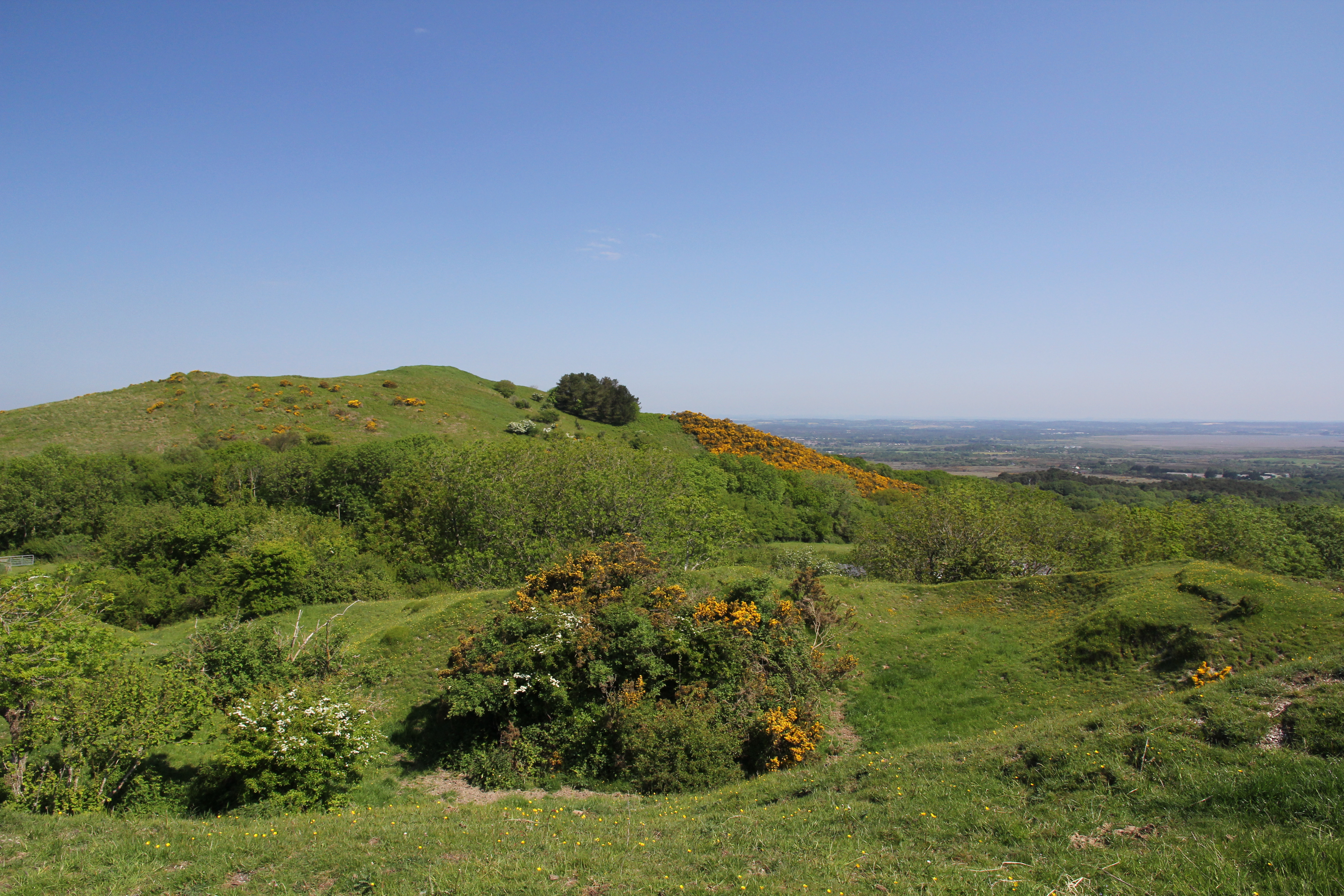
- Creech Barrow Hill seen from the area of Stonehill Down to the south

Highest point
- Elevation: 188.2 m (617 ft)
- Prominence: 33.1 m (109 ft)
- Parent peak: Lewesdon Hill
- Listing: Tump
- Coordinates: 50°38′29.48″N 2°6′37.16″W

Geography
- Location: Dorset, England
- Parent range: Dorset Heaths
- OS grid: SY921823
- Topo map: OS Landranger 195

Geology
- Mountain type: Cenozoic

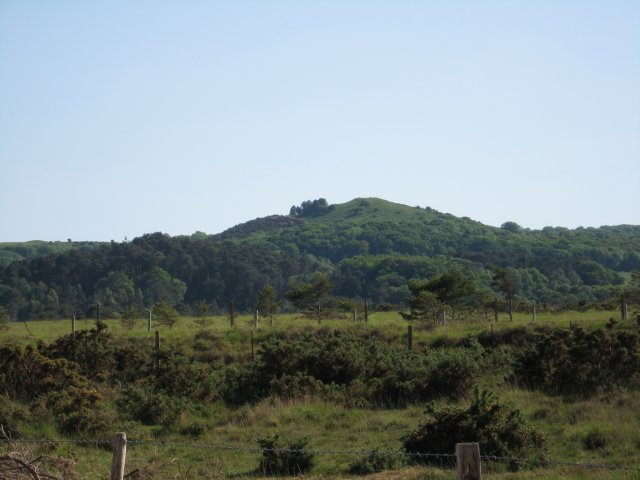
Creech Barrow Hill seen from the north

Creech Barrow Hill is a steep, conical hill, 188.2 metres (617 ft) near the coast of Dorset, England, and the highest point of the Dorset Heaths. It has been described as "one of Dorset's most distinctive landmarks." Geologically, it is also the highest Cenozoic hill in England.

There is a single, round barrow at the summit that gives Creech Barrow Hill its name and, from some angles, the appearance of a double summit. To the southeast is Stone Hill Down long barrow.

The name of the hill means "hill" three times. "Creech" is derived from the Celtic crich = hill and "barrow" from the Saxon for "mound".

The hill is a classic viewpoint that was once the site of King John's hunting lodge.

The barrow has an OS trig pillar 10m from the highest point. It is shown as 193m on Ordnance Survey maps, the height being levelled in 1951. Following subsidence, the pillar was downgraded to Order 4 in 1971 and is shown without a height in OS legacy benchmark data
