= Purbeck Hills =

Chalk ridge in Dorset, England

Coordinates: 50°38′N 2°07′W

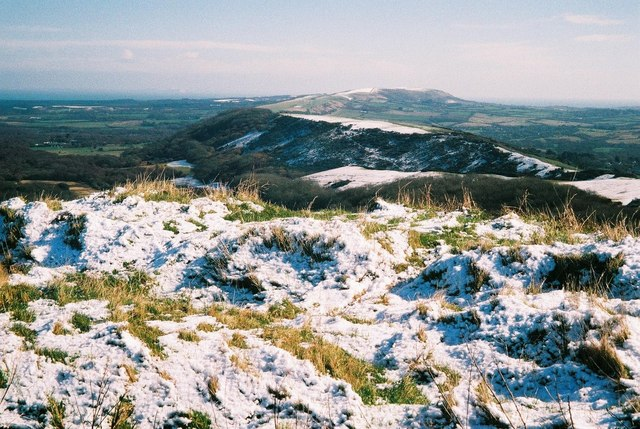
Looking east along the top of the ridge

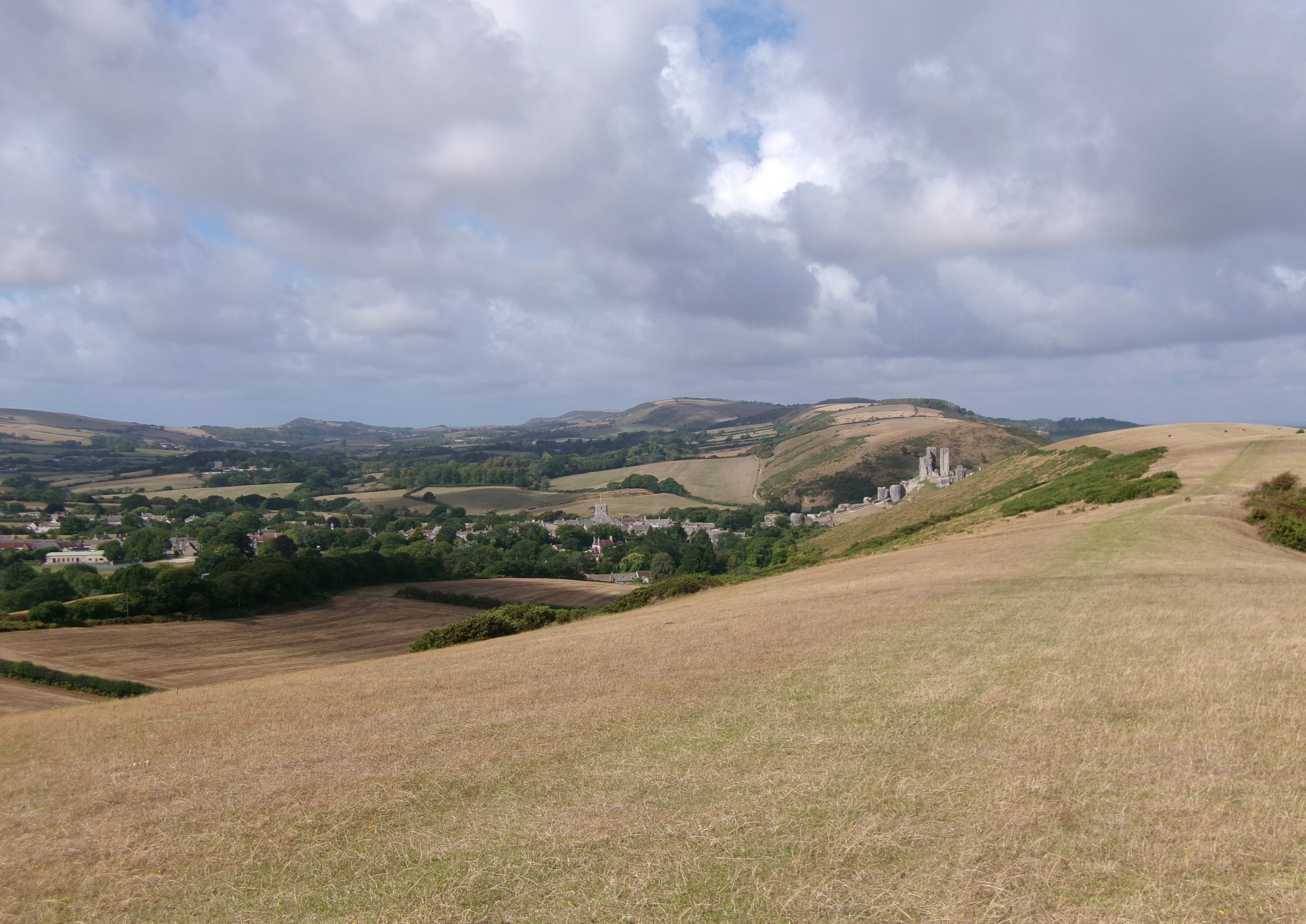
View west along the hills, with Corfe Castle in the middle distance

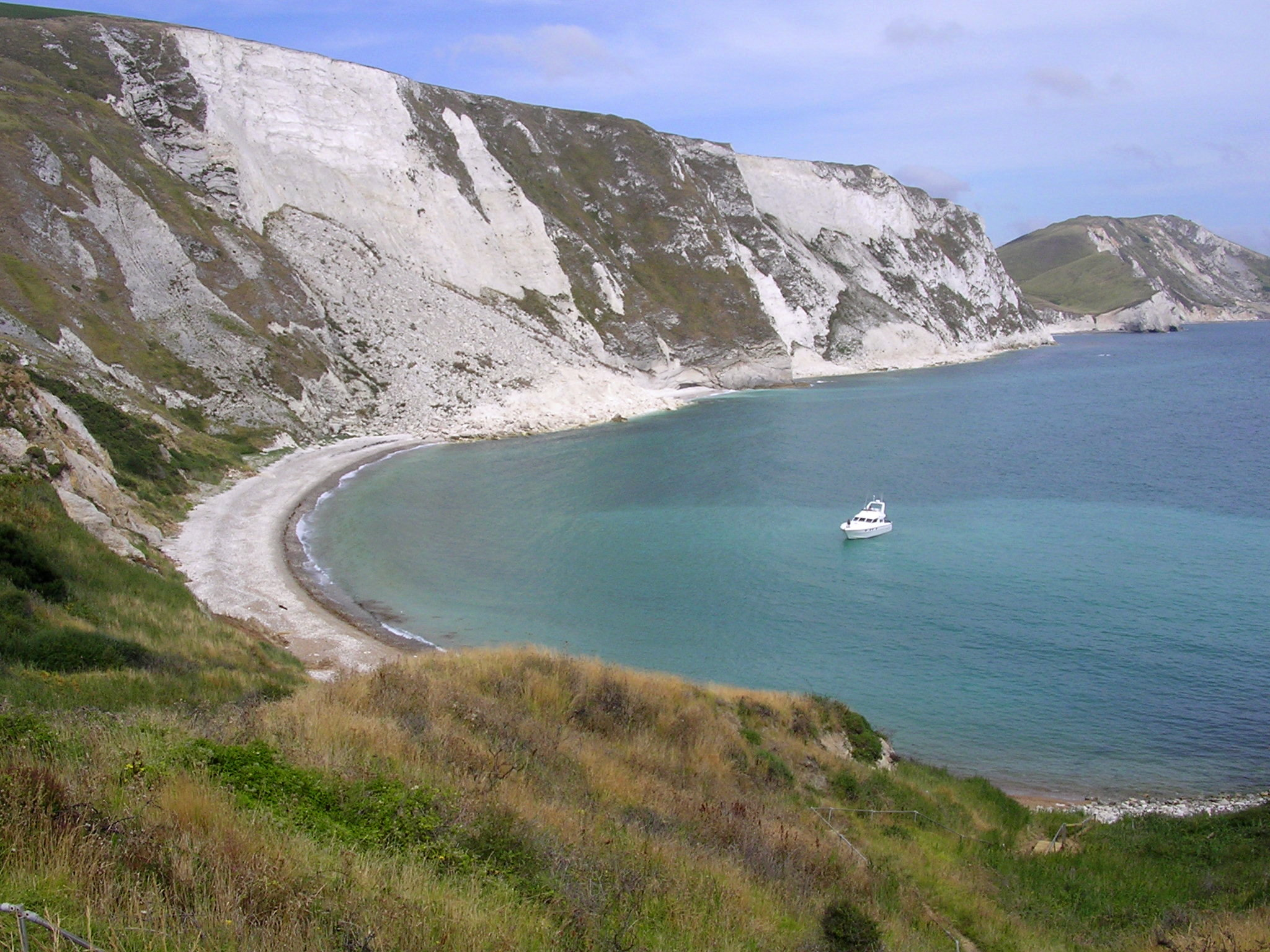
Chalk cliffs, with cliff fall, at the eastern end of Bindon Hill

The Purbeck Hills, also called the Purbeck Ridge or simply the Purbecks, are a ridge of chalk downs in Dorset, England. The ridge is formed by the structure known as the Purbeck Monocline, and extends from Lulworth Cove in the west to Old Harry Rocks in the east, where it meets the sea. The hills are part of a system of chalk downlands in southern England formed from the Chalk Group which also includes Salisbury Plain and the South Downs. For most of their length the chalk of the Purbeck Hills is protected from coastal erosion by a band of resistant Portland limestone. Where this band ends, at Durlston Head, the clay and chalk behind has been eroded, creating Poole Bay and the Solent. The ridge of steeply dipping chalk that forms the Purbeck Hills continues further east on the Isle of Wight.

The height of the chalk ridge and proximity to Poole Harbour and the south coast have made the hills of strategic importance. There are a number of Iron Age, Roman and Saxon archaeological sites, such as Nine Barrow Down. At Corfe Castle the hills are broken twice leaving a steep round hill between the ridges on which stood a medieval castle, guarding the only easy route through the hills, until the English Civil War of the 17th century, when it was slighted.

Some of the ridge, around the village of Tyneham, near Lulworth, has been closed to the public for use by the army as a firing range. This has protected them from damage from farming and development, and these areas are now nature reserves. At the eastern end Ballard Down is a National Trust nature reserve which is managed for its calcareous grassland habitat.

== Named hills ==
- Nine Barrow Down (199 m)
- Ridgeway Hill (199 m)
- Creech Barrow Hill (193 m) - sometimes counted as part of the Dorset Heaths
- Bindon Hill (168 m), overlooking Lulworth Cove
- Ballard Down

== See also ==
- Isle of Purbeck
- Geology of Dorset
- Jurassic Coast
