= Hambury Tout =

Mountain in England

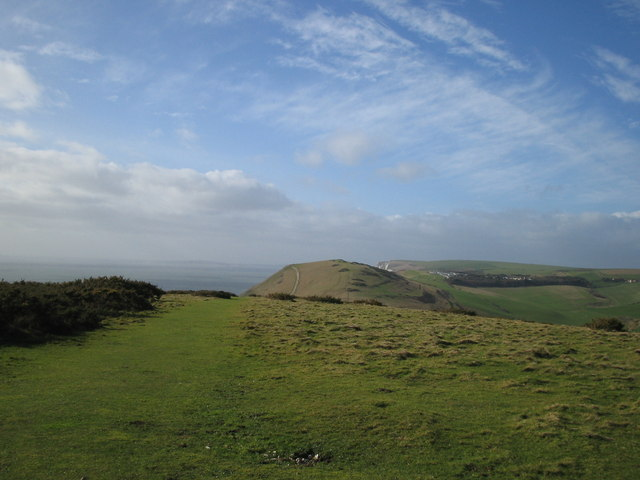
- Hambury Tout seen from Bindon Hill on the eastern side of Lulworth Cove

Highest point
- Elevation: 134 m (440 ft)
- Coordinates: 50.6220°N 2.2617°W

Geography
- Location: Dorset, England
- Parent range: Purbeck Hills
- OS grid: SY815802
- Topo map: OS Landranger 194

Climbing
- Easiest route: From Durdle Door or Lulworth Cove

Hambury Tout is a large chalk hill by the coast near Lulworth, Dorset, England.

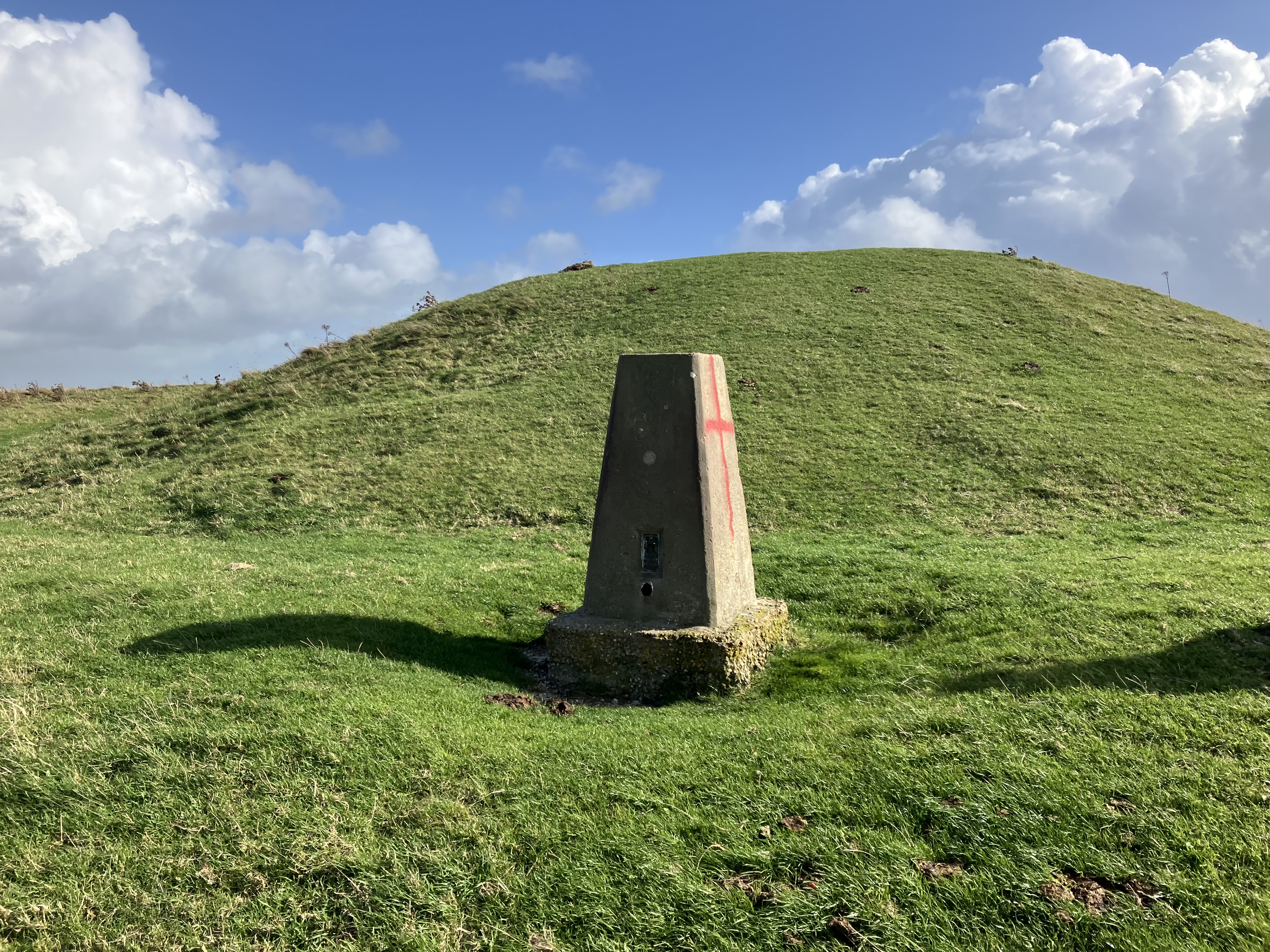
The tumulus and trig point at the summit of Hambury Tout

The hill overlooks Lulworth Cove to the west. To the east is Durdle Door. It lies on the Jurassic Coast near St Oswald's Bay on the coast. The South West Coast Path passes over the hill, connecting Lulworth Cove and Durdle Door with a steep but popular walk.

The summit of Hambury Tout is the site of a tumulus, an ancient burial mound. Nearby, there is also a trig point at the top of the hill.

The height of the hill is 138 m (453 ft).

== See also ==
- Dungy Head
- St Oswald's Bay
