= Scheduled monuments in Birmingham =

List of protected ancient monuments in Birmingham, England

There are thirteen scheduled monuments in Birmingham, England.

In the United Kingdom, a scheduled monument is a "nationally important" archaeological site or historic building that has been given protection against unauthorised change by being placed on a list (or "schedule") by the Secretary of State for Culture, Media and Sport; English Heritage takes the leading role in identifying such sites. Monuments are defined in the Ancient Monuments and Archaeological Areas Act 1979 and the National Heritage Act 1983. Scheduled monuments—sometimes referred to as scheduled ancient monuments—can also be protected through listed building procedures, and English Heritage considers listed building status to be a better way of protecting buildings and standing structures. A scheduled monument that is later determined to "no longer merit scheduling" can be descheduled.

== List ==
Birmingham's scheduled monuments are:

Name	Location	Type	Completed (Note: The date given is the date used by Historic England as significant for the initial building or that of an important part in the structure's description.)	Date designated	Grid ref. (Note: Sometimes known as OSGB36, the grid reference is based on the British national grid reference system used by the Ordnance Survey.) Geo-coordinates	Notes	Entry number (Note: The "List Entry Number" is a unique number assigned to each listed building and scheduled monument by Historic England.)	Image	Ref.	Wikidata
Burnt mound in Fox Hollies Park	Fox Hollies	Burnt mound		24 July 2002	SP 12471 82177; 52°26′15″N 1°49′05″W	140m south east of Round Pool	1020541	Burnt mound in Fox Hollies Park More images		Q17601480
Moated site, Gannow Green	Gannow Green	Moated site		12 November 1962	SO 98448 78393; 52°24′13″N 2°01′27″W	700m east of Gannow Green Farm	1017810	Moated site, Gannow Green		Q17601536
Guillotine Lock, Stratford Canal	King's Norton	Guillotine lock	1814		SP 05582 79473; 52°24′48″N 1°55′10″W		1005885	Guillotine Lock, Stratford Canal		Q17601543
Hawkesley Farm moated site		Moated site			SP 01761 77589; 52°23′47″N 1°58′32″W		1005909	Hawkesley Farm moated site		Q17601544
Kent's Moat		Moated site			SP 14386 86262; 52°28′27″N 1°47′23″W			Kent's Moat		Q17601548
King's Standing Bowl Barrow	Kingstanding	Bowl barrow	Late Neolithic/ Late Bronze Age	9 October 1981	SP 08049 95597; 52°33′29″N 1°52′58″W		1016437	King's Standing Bowl Barrow		Q6411111
Burnt mounds at Moseley Bog	Moseley	Burnt mounds		24 July 2002	SP 09343 82043; 52°26′10″N 1°51′47″W	380m north east of Moseley New Pool; coordinates are approx	1020542	Burnt mounds at Moseley Bog More images		Q17601551
Moated site, Peddimore Hall	Sutton Coldfield	Moated site	1659	15 December 1997	52°32′27″N 1°46′34″W	Now a private residence	1017648	Moated site, Peddimore Hall		Q17601556
Perry Bridge	Perry Barr	Bridge	1711		SP 07079 91936; 52°31′31″N 1°53′50″W		1002980	Perry Bridge More images		Q7169729
Medieval deer park and other archaeological remains in Sutton Park	Sutton Park	Deer park		30 June 1971	SP 08966 96072; 52°33′42″N 1°51′14″W	Also SP 09976 98407, SP 10486 96699	1020420	Medieval deer park and other archaeological remains in Sutton Park More images		Q17601623
Weoley Castle	Weoley Castle (district)	Remains of a fortified manor house			SP 02165 82757; 52°26′34″N 1°58′11″W		1005905	Weoley Castle More images		Q7983099
Burnt mounds in Woodlands Park		Burnt mounds		24 July 2002	SP 03438 80247; 52°25′13″N 1°57′03″W	540m and 640m west of The Pavilion; also SP 03530 80299	1020540	Burnt mounds in Woodlands Park		Q17601559
