= Metchley Fort =

Roman fort in Birmingham, United Kingdom

Coordinates: 52.4504°N 1.938°W

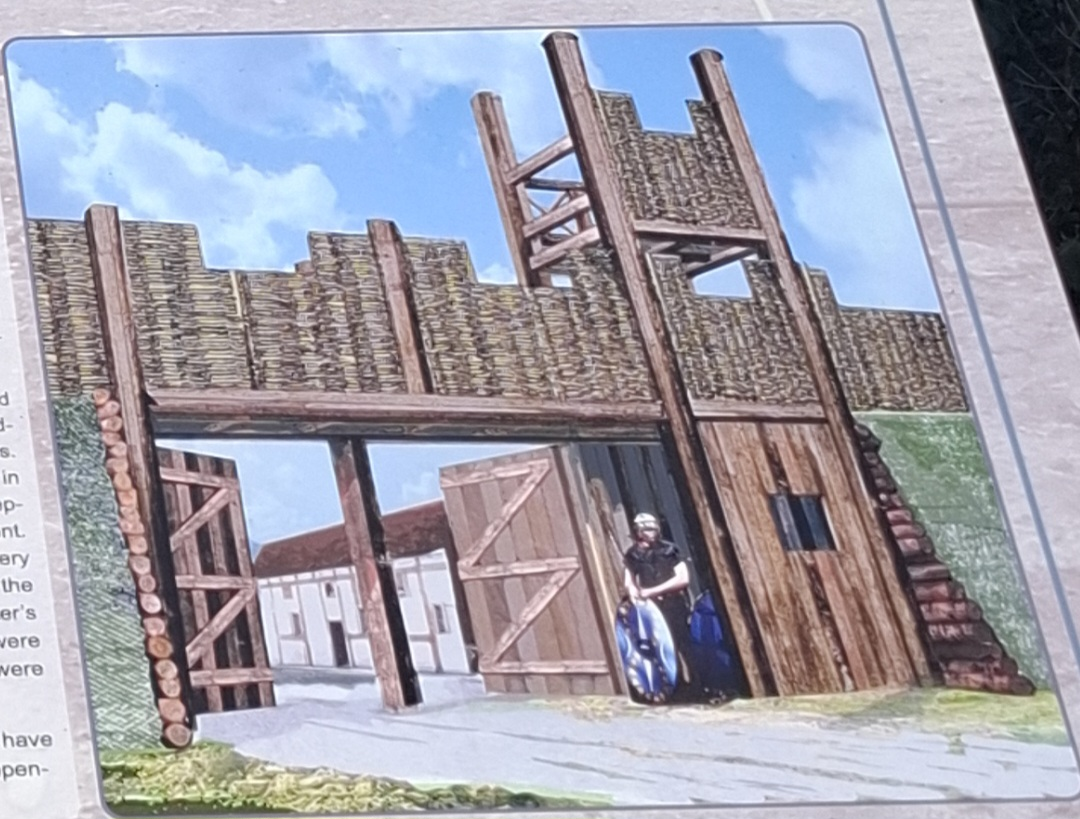
- Reconstruction of the East Gate and its defences

- Location within West Midlands county
- Location: Metchley, Birmingham, West Midlands, England

History
- Founded: c. AD 48
- Built: Claudius
- Abandoned: c. AD 200

Site notes
- Excavation dates: 1934–present
- Archaeologists: Mick Aston
- Discovered: c. 1781
- Condition: Earthworks, crop marks and ditches; buried ruins

Metchley Fort was a Roman fort in what is now Birmingham, England. It was built across four phases using a north-to-south plan.

== History ==
=== Roman era (c. AD 48 – c. AD 200) ===
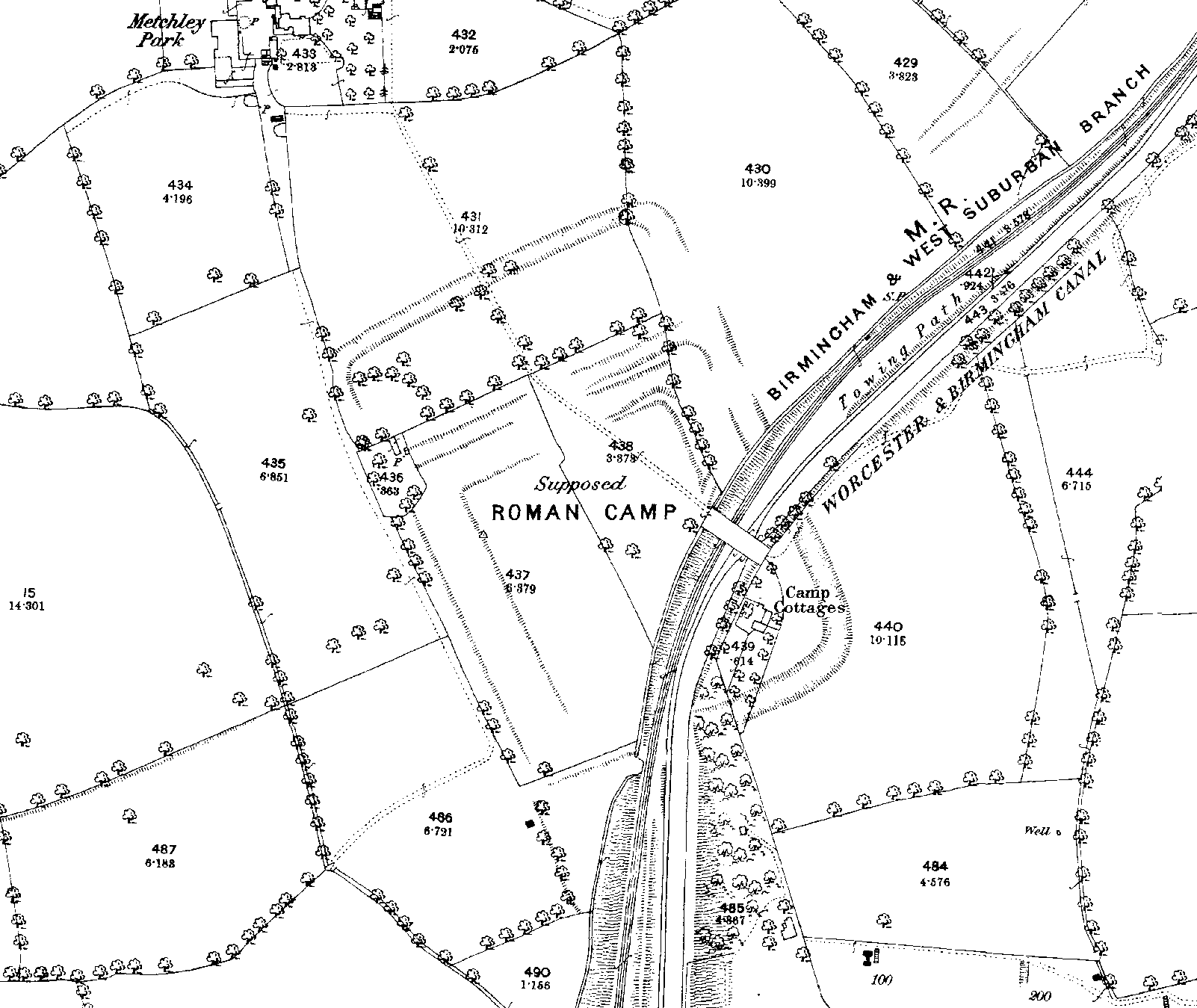
The remains of Metchley Fort as shown on the 1890 Ordnance Survey map of Warwickshire. The footbridge over the railway is now the site of University railway station.

Metchley Fort lies on the course of a Roman road known as Icknield Street, which is now the site of the present Queen Elizabeth Hospital and the University of Birmingham in Edgbaston. The fort was constructed over marshland and three former Bronze Age burnt mounds on the orders of Publius Ostorius Scapula soon after the Roman invasion of Britain, roughly in AD 48. The fort was around 200 square metres (2,153 sq ft) in area and was defended by a turf and earth bank with a timber wall, towers and double ditches. Within the fort were timber buildings including barrack blocks, a granary, a workshop and a store. In AD 60 or 61, Metchley Fort may have been involved in the Boudican Revolt, and it was abandoned in AD 70, only to be reoccupied around AD 90, when another fort, half the size of the original, was built on the same site, before being abandoned again in AD 120. It would then likely have been in sporadic use as a training camp up until its complete abandonment by c. AD 200.

Remains of a civilian settlement, or vicus, have been found next to the fort. It consisted of timber buildings and yards, alongside a road leading from the fort's west gate, and was occupied for just a few years when the fort was at its largest.

The fort was extended on three sides by the addition of defended annexes, which were used for tethering horses, storage and small-scale industrial activity such as ironworking. Later, the fort's buildings were replaced by other structures including compounds, which suggests that it was now being used as a stores depot.

=== Post-medieval era (16th–18th century) ===
A hunting lodge was present on the site of Metchley Fort as early as the 16th century, likely near the retentura and latera praetorii. It was eventually demolished around 1781 when the earthworks of the fort were first identified. The fort was also almost lost to cultivation around this time.

=== Discovery and excavations (c. 1781 – present) ===
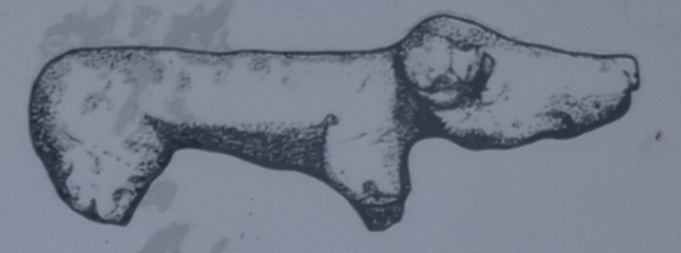
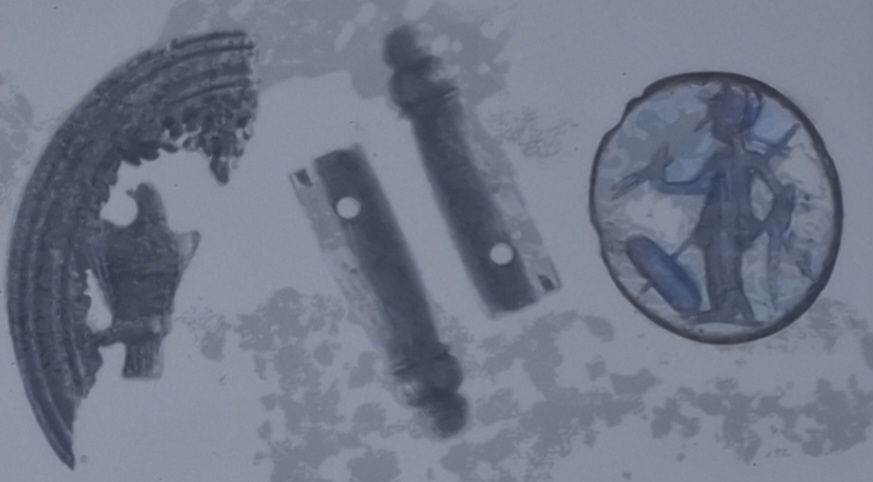
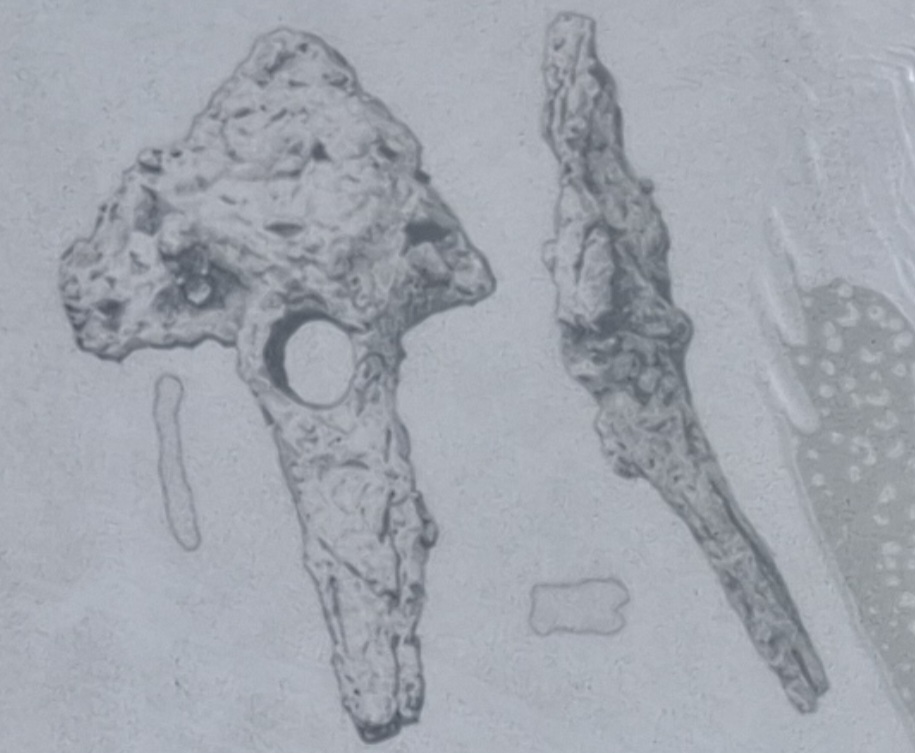
Artefacts recovered from excavations at Metchley Fort. From left to right: a bronze animal (possibly a dog), a bone brooch depicting an eagle, two bone pins, an intaglio gemstone, and an entrenching tool. Terra sigilata and a spearhead were also discovered.

The remains were first identified around 1781 by William Hutton, who published his findings on Metchley Fort in his An History of Birmingham. Although there were conflicting opinions on the origins of the earthworks, the common consensus at the time agreed that the fort was Norse in origin.

The fort was confirmed to date to the 1st and 2nd century AD in excavations that took place in the 1930s, starting in 1934, when the University of Birmingham Medical School was constructed. Further excavations took place in the 1940s and 1950s. On 28 September 1953, the Lord Mayor of Birmingham, G. H. W. Griffith, opened the newly restored north-west corner of the fort. The reconstruction of the corner did not last long, however, as it was later destroyed by vandals before 1956. More extensive excavations took place in the 1960s, which uncovered various timber buildings within the fort. Mick Aston, who later became well-known on the TV programme Time Team, worked on the Metchley excavations in the late 1960s. Discoveries from excavations in the early 2000s included ovens and hearths, timber gateways, roads, the headquarters building, vessels from the Severn Valley and the Malvern Hills, and tableware from France.

Metchley Fort was excavated in 1969, 1987, 1995, and between 1997 and 1998.

The remains of the fort are one of thirteen Scheduled monuments in Birmingham.

== Gallery ==
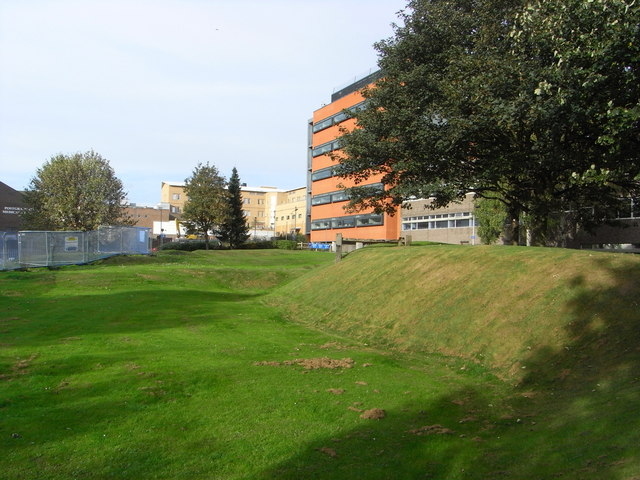
The site of the praetentura, pictured here in 2009

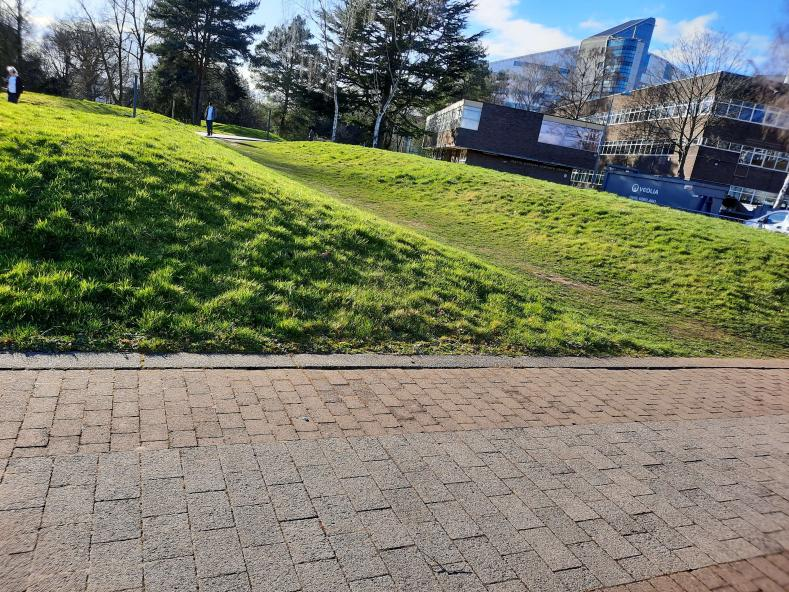
Site of the north-western gate and the main street entering the fort; from the first fort, constructed circa AD 48 and pictured here in 2023

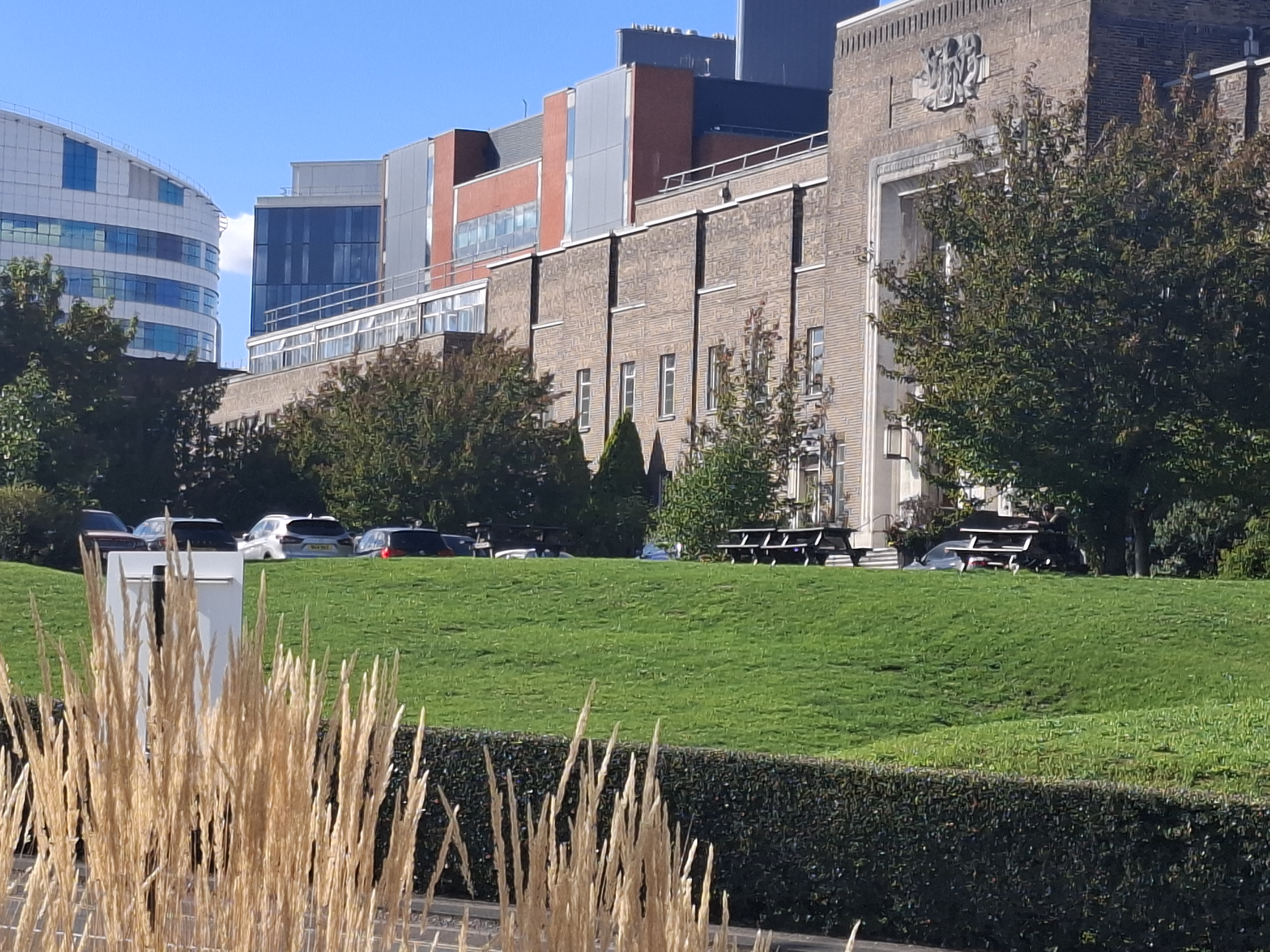
Surviving earthworks at the northern annexe

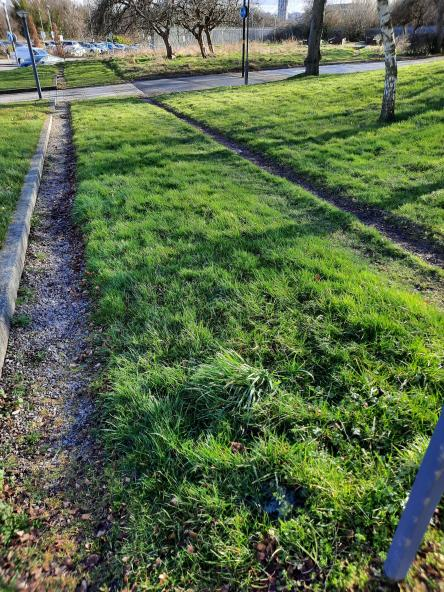
Site of a via decumana, a rear road into the fort, pictured here in 2023

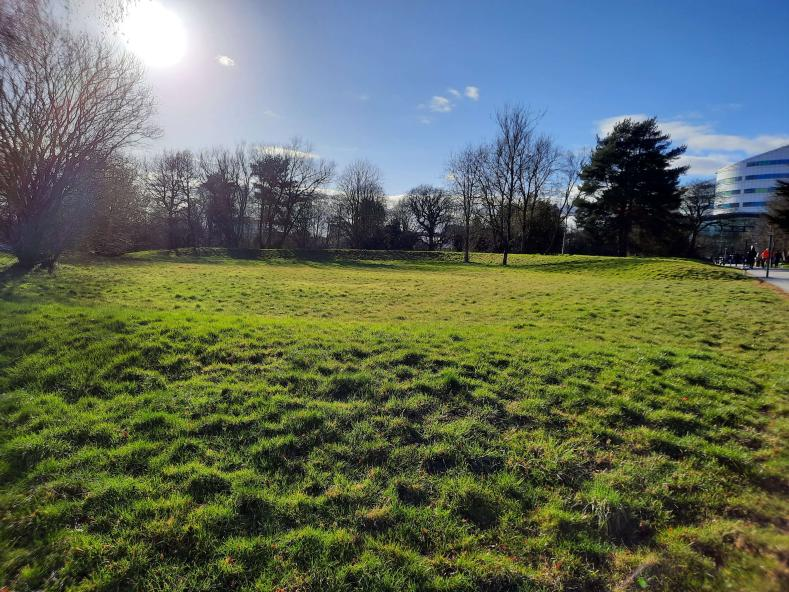
Site of the retentura of the fort, overlooking the vicus and ditch, pictured here in 2023

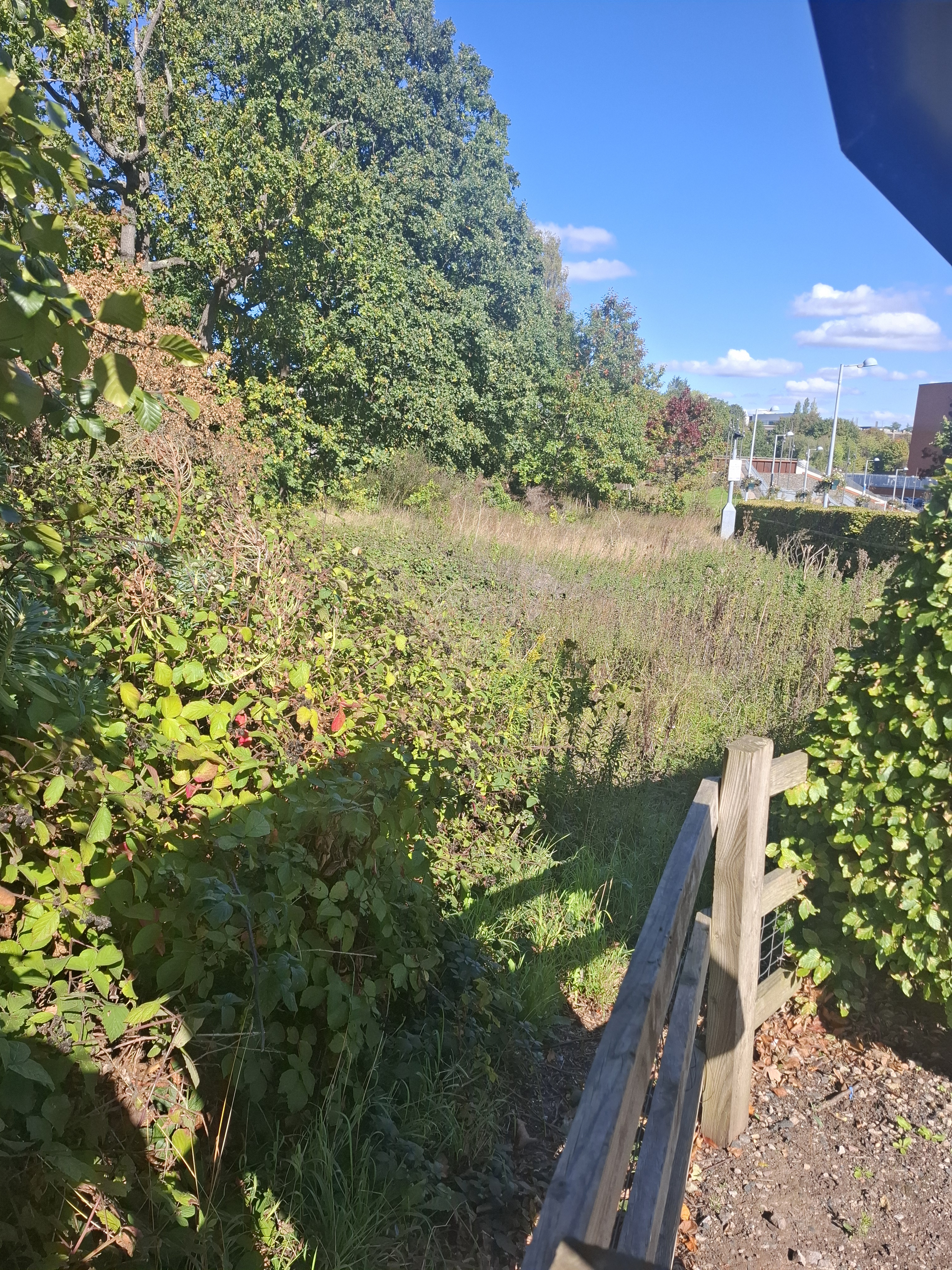
Site of the East Gate and its defences

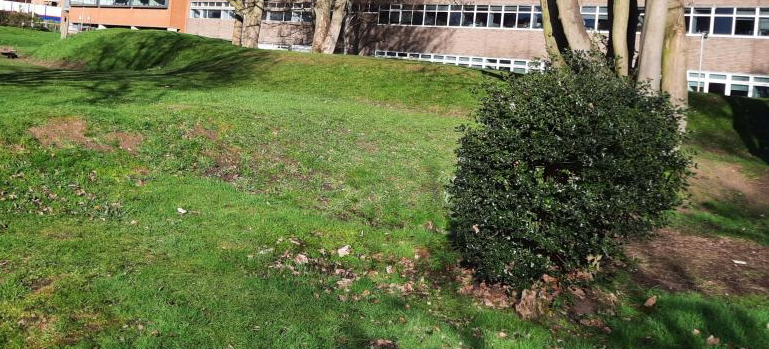
Site of the praetentura of the fort, pictured here in 2023

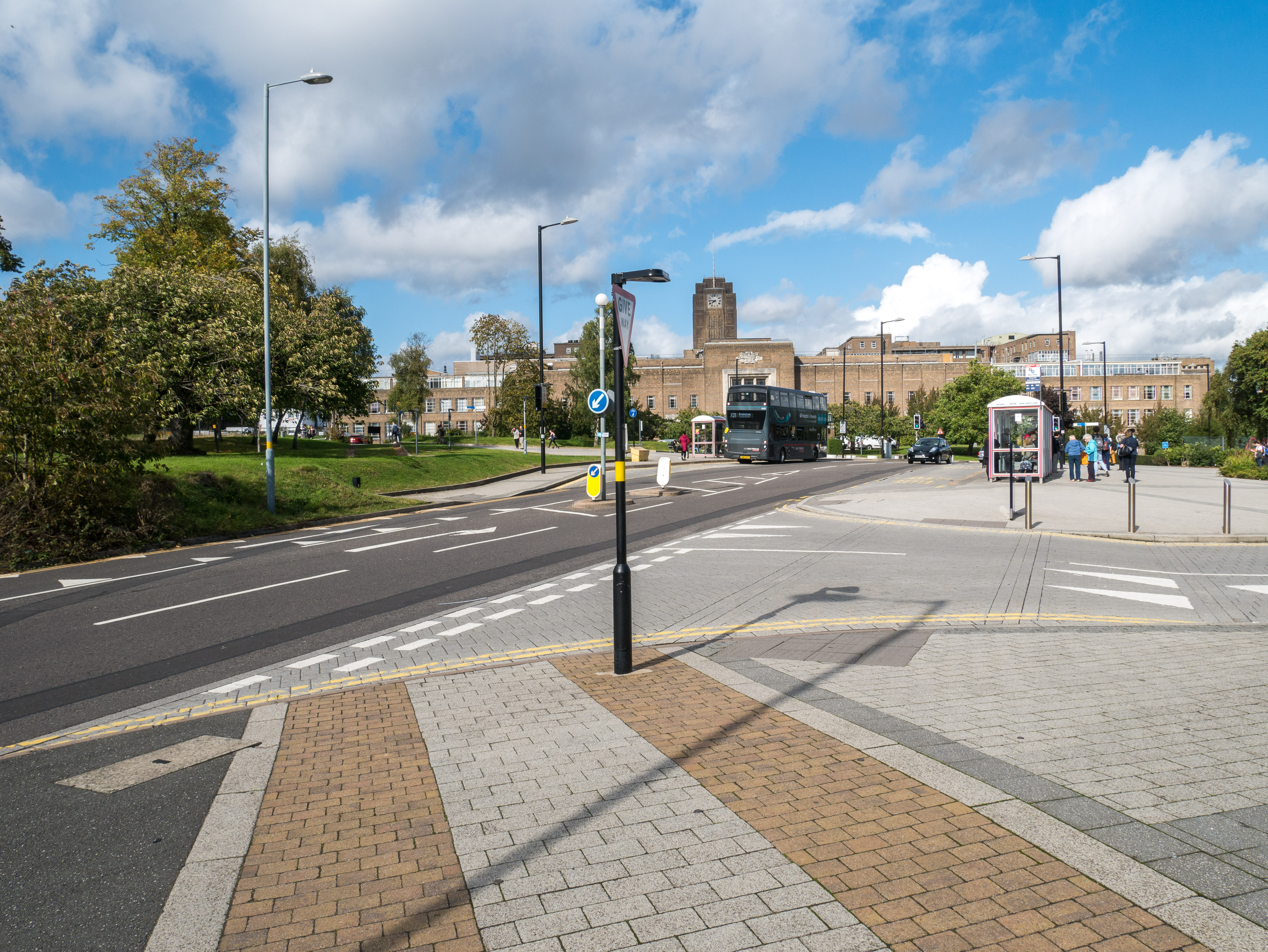
View of the site of Metchley Fort from the approximate centre of the fort, pictured in 2019. The position of a Roman street through the fort has been marked by the two lines of yellow bricks in the pavement. This street ran between the north-west gate and the south-east gate.
