= Burnt mound in Fox Hollies Park =

- Location: Fox Hollies, Birmingham, England
- Coordinates: 52°26′15″N 1°49′05″W
- Built: Bronze Age

Scheduled monument
- Official name: Burnt mound in Fox Hollies Park, 140m south east of Round Pool

The Burnt mound in Fox Hollies Park is a Bronze Age burnt mound archaeological feature located in Fox Hollies Park, in the Fox Hollies area of south Birmingham. It is a scheduled monument, having been scheduled by English Heritage (now Historic England) on 24 July 2002. It consists of an oval mound about 0.3m tall and about 14m by 9m in length.

== Gallery ==
The mound, pictured in September 2019

The mound, pictured in September 2019

The mound, pictured in September 2019

== See also ==
- Scheduled monuments in Birmingham
