= Swyre Head, Lulworth =

Hill and sea cliff in Dorset, England

Coordinates: 50.6238°N 2.2851°W

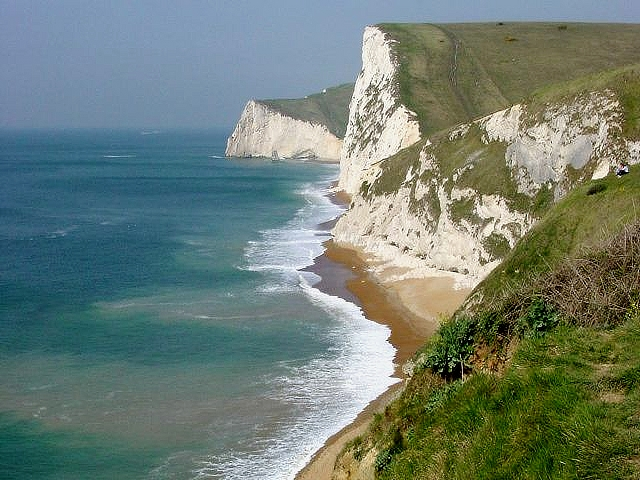
View west from Bat's Head towards White Nothe with the taller Swyre Head behind.

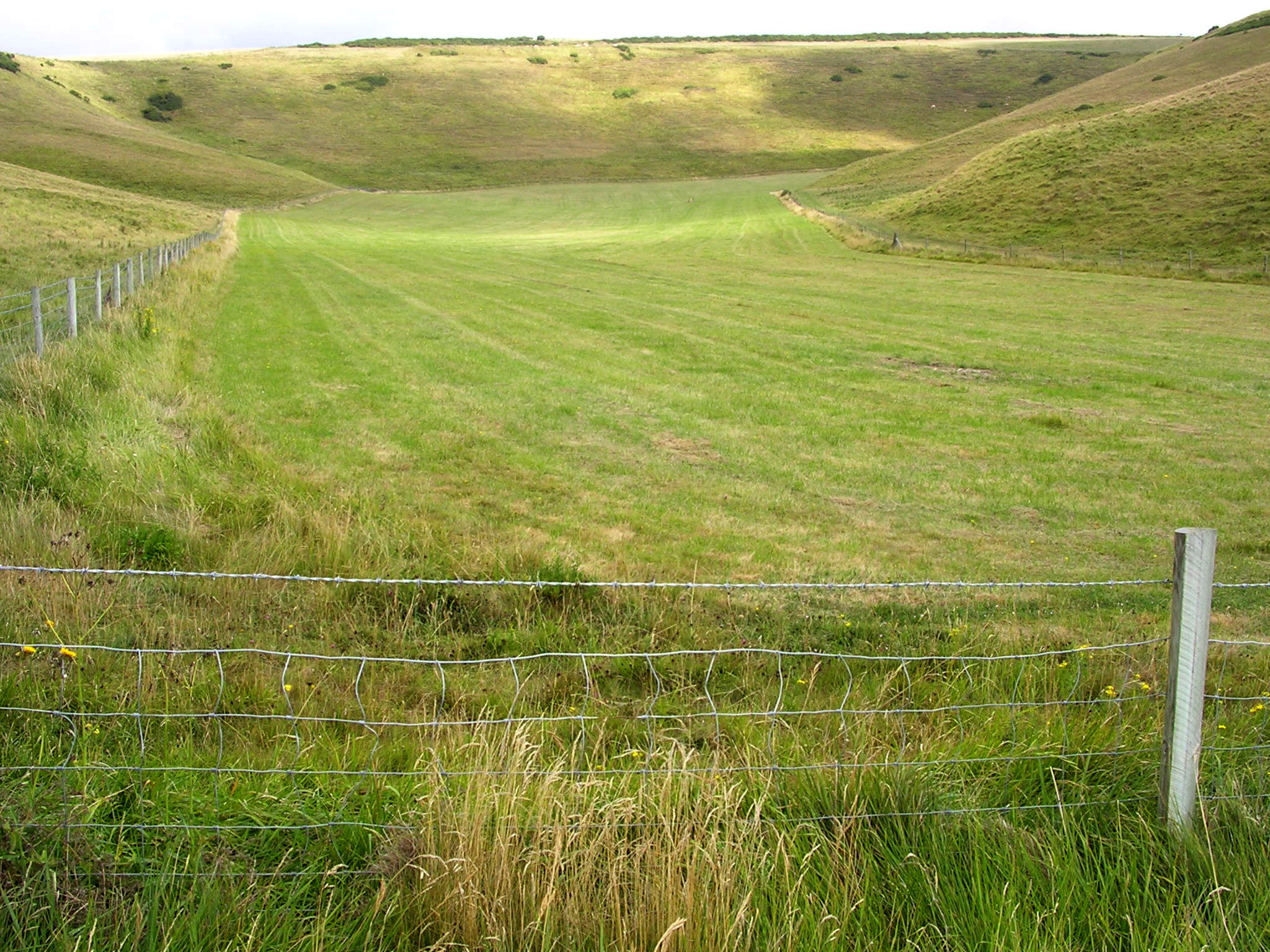
The dry valley of Scratchy Bottom, between Swyre Head and Durdle Door.

Swyre Head, Lulworth is a hill and sea cliff which lies on the Jurassic Coast between Bat's Head to the west and Durdle Door to the east, close to Lulworth (further to the east) in Dorset, England. It is located approximately 8 miles (12.9 km) east of Weymouth and 14 miles (22.5 km) west of Swanage.

Swyre Head, Lulworth, lies only about 8.5 miles (13.7 km) west of another Swyre Head, which is located close to the village of Kingston and which is the highest point on the peninsula known as the Isle of Purbeck.

The cliffs of Swyre Head, Lulworth, are of chalk and are steep, with grassland and a footpath above. The footpath runs close to the cliff edge and is steeply undulating. Despite the steepness, it is popular for walks and the scenery is spectacular.

Between Swyre Head and the natural rock arch of Durdle Door is a small dry valley known as Scratchy Bottom.
