= Dungy =

Dungy can refer to:

- Tony Dungy, football player and coach
- Camille Dungy, poet
- Dungy Head, a place
