= Fulacht fiadh =

Burned mound from the Bronze Age in Ireland

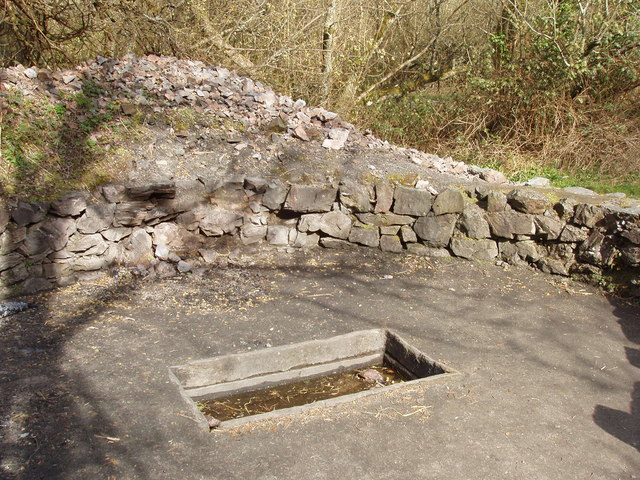
Reconstruction of a fulacht fiadh at the Irish National Heritage Park in County Wexford, Ireland

Fulacht fiadh (Irish pronunciation: [ˈfˠʊlˠəxt̪ˠ ˈfʲiə]; Irish: fulacht fiadh or fulacht fian; plural: fulachtaí fia or, in older texts, fulachta fiadh) is the name given to one of many burned mounds, dating from the Bronze Age, found in Ireland. Most surviving examples consist of a low horseshoe-shaped mound of charcoal-enriched soil, and heat-shattered stone, with a cooking pit located in a slight depression at its centre. In ploughed fields, they are apparent as black spreads of earth interspersed with small sharp stones.

There are multiple examples of fulacht fiadh in Ireland. The majority were constructed during the mid– to late Bronze Age (c. 1500 BC – c. 500 BC), though some Neolithic and a few medieval examples are known. In Great Britain and the Isle of Man they are known as burnt mounds, and similar objects are found in Sweden. Permanent structures are seldom found near to fulachtaí fiadh, but small hut sites are common, and it is unknown whether early sites were built by local settlers or nomadic hunters.

== Etymology ==
Many historians suggest that the Irish word "fulacht" denotes a cooking pit. In modern Irish, it is one word for a barbecue. "Fiadh" in Old Irish meant something like "wild", often relating to animals such as deer. However, all acknowledge the difficulties in deriving a genuine etymology for the word "fulacht". As some historical texts clearly use the term "fulacht" to describe a cooking spit, a close reading of these accounts suggests that the term actually derives from a word meaning support and probably carries a deliberate reference to the Irish words for blood (fuil) and meat (feoil).

== Siting ==
Fulachtaí fiadh are usually found close to water sources, such as springs, rivers and streams, or waterlogged ground. They were also sited close to sources of suitable stone where it could be obtained close to the surface. They required a source of fuel, so would have been close to woodland. They would also have to be in proximity to whatever was being processed by boiling in the trough. Once these conditions were met a fulacht fiadh could be constructed. Once the use of a fulacht fiadh had ended it was common for people to continue to make use of the local landscape, therefore fulachtaí fiadh tend to be found in groups strung out along water courses.

== Construction ==
Fulachtaí fiadh generally consist of three main elements: a mound of stones, a hearth used to heat the stones, and a trough, often lined with wood or stone, which was filled with water and into which the heated stones were placed to warm the water. Troughs may be cut into subsoil or, more rarely, into bedrock. The site may contain the remains of structures such as stone enclosures or even small buildings, and sometimes multiple hearths and additional, smaller pits. They are almost always found near running water, or in marshy areas where a hole dug into the ground would quickly fill with water.

A number of the fulachtaí fiadh pits are approximately a metre wide by 2 metres long and maybe half a metre or more in depth. However, size can vary a great deal from site to site, from rather small pits lined with stones to pools conceivably large enough for people to bathe in.

== Function ==
It is postulated that these pits were filled with water and heated stones thrown in to create a pool of boiling water in which meat was cooked. This is because when excavated, fulachtaí fiadh are found with associated charred, scorched and broken rocks. The Ballyvourney reconstruction also included successful attempts at heating the water and cooking meat in this manner.

Other theories suggest that the sites may have been used for bathing, the washing and dyeing of cloth, and leather working. Supporters of these theories point to the fact that no remains of foodstuffs have been found at the fulacht fiadh sites. Some researchers believe the fulachtaí fiadh were multi-purpose and could have, at least in some cases, been used for all of these activities - cooking, bathing, dyeing, or anything involving hot water. Some fulacht fiadh reconstructions, such as the one at Ballyvourney, include circular, hut-type structures based on the post holes found at the sites; some believe these small buildings were used for the storing and preparation of foodstuffs. Another theory is that the small buildings on site were used for enclosing heat and steam in a manner similar to the Tigh 'n Alluis Gaelic sweat-houses (which were built of stone), however, this theory does not take into account the fact that the hot water trough is located outside the buildings (when a building is even present at all).

In August 2007, two Galway based archaeologists suggested that fulachtaí fiadh were used primarily for the brewing of beer, and experimented by filling a large wooden trough with water and adding heated stones. Once the water had reached approximately 65 degrees Celsius they added barley and after 45 minutes transferred it to separate vessels to ferment, first adding wild plant flavourings and yeast. Some days later they discovered that it had transformed into a drinkable light ale.

This method of brewing with hot stones is widely documented across Europe in the modern period, and survives as a living tradition in Finland, Latvia, and Russia.

== Sources ==
- Higgins, Jim, 1991, A new group of fulachta fiad in Co. Mayo, in Cathair na Mart 11, pp. 31–34, 1991
- O'Kelley, Michael J., 1989. Early Ireland – An Introduction to Irish Prehistory. Cambridge University Press, Cambridge. pp. 223–227 ISBN 0-521-33687-2
- Harbison, Peter, 1988. Pre-Christian Ireland – From the First Settlers to the Early Celts. Thames and Hudson, New York. pp. 8, 110–112, and plate 65. ISBN 0-500-27809-1
- Murphy, Cornelius. The Prehistoric Archaeology of the Beara Peninsula, Co. Cork. Department of Archaeology, University College Cork, 1997
