= Scratchy's Bottom =

Clifftop valley in Dorset, England

Coordinates: 50°37′25″N 02°16′52″W

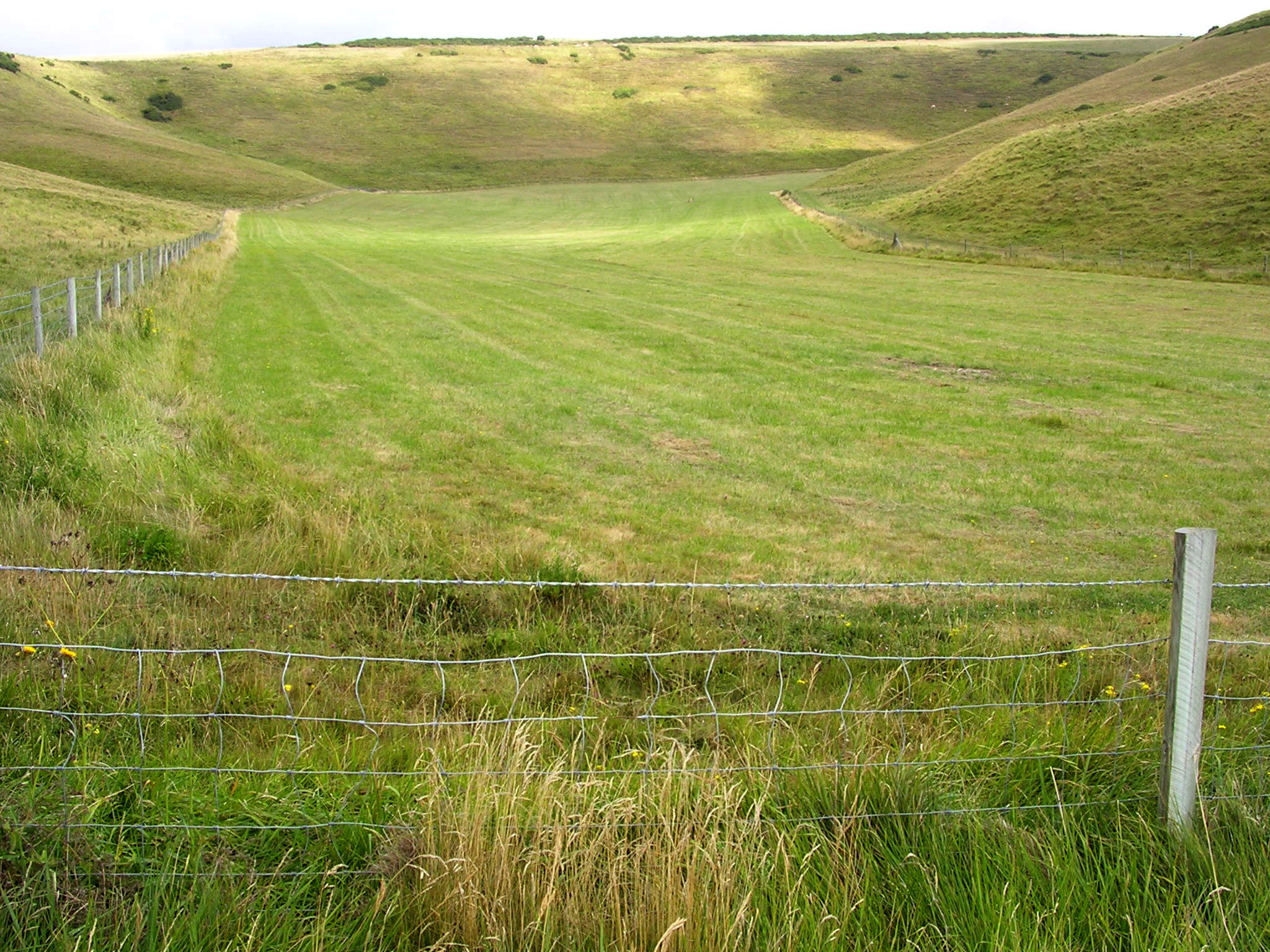
Scratchy's Bottom

Scratchy's Bottom (or Scratchy Bottom) is a clifftop valley between Durdle Door and Bat's Head in Dorset, England: Grid reference SY 803 807. A dry valley in the chalk, it is surrounded by farmland at its sides and landward end, with cliffs at the seaward end.

The name is thought to refer to a rough hollow. Scratchy's Bottom has been noted for its unusual place name. The location came second after Shitterton, also in Dorset, in a 2012 poll for "Britain's worst place name" carried out by the genealogy website Find My Past.

Scratchy's Bottom was the location for the opening of the 1967 film Far from the Madding Crowd, in a scene in which Gabriel Oak's sheep are driven over a cliff by his sheepdog.
