= St Oswald's Bay =

English natural landscape

Coordinates: 50.6207°N 2.2690°W

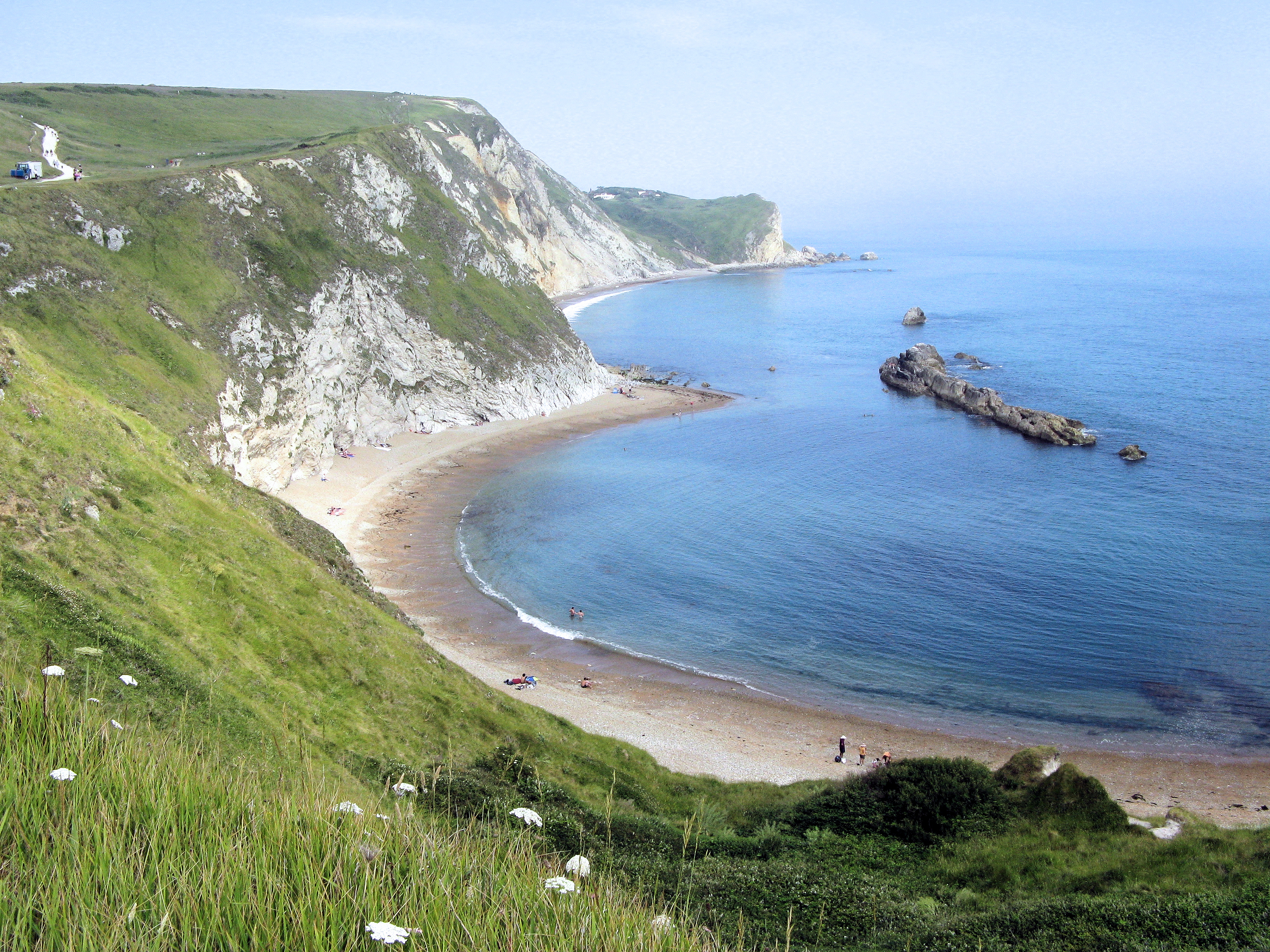
St Oswald's Bay, Dorset, from the cliffs above Man O'War Cove

St Oswald's Bay is located near Lulworth on the Jurassic Coast in Dorset, England.

The bay has a narrow beach of shingle with high chalk cliffs. The beach is cut off at high tide at the western end. At the eastern end, the descent to the shore is steep and slippery if wet. The beach is isolated with no facilities.

There are sometimes rockfalls and landslides on the cliffs, a particularly large one occurring in April 2013, which resulted in the destruction and closure of part of the South West Coast Path on the clifftop.

== See also ==
- Hambury Tout
- Dungy Head
