= Man o' War Cove =

Bay on the Dorset coast in southern England

Coordinates: 50.6204°N 2.2703°W

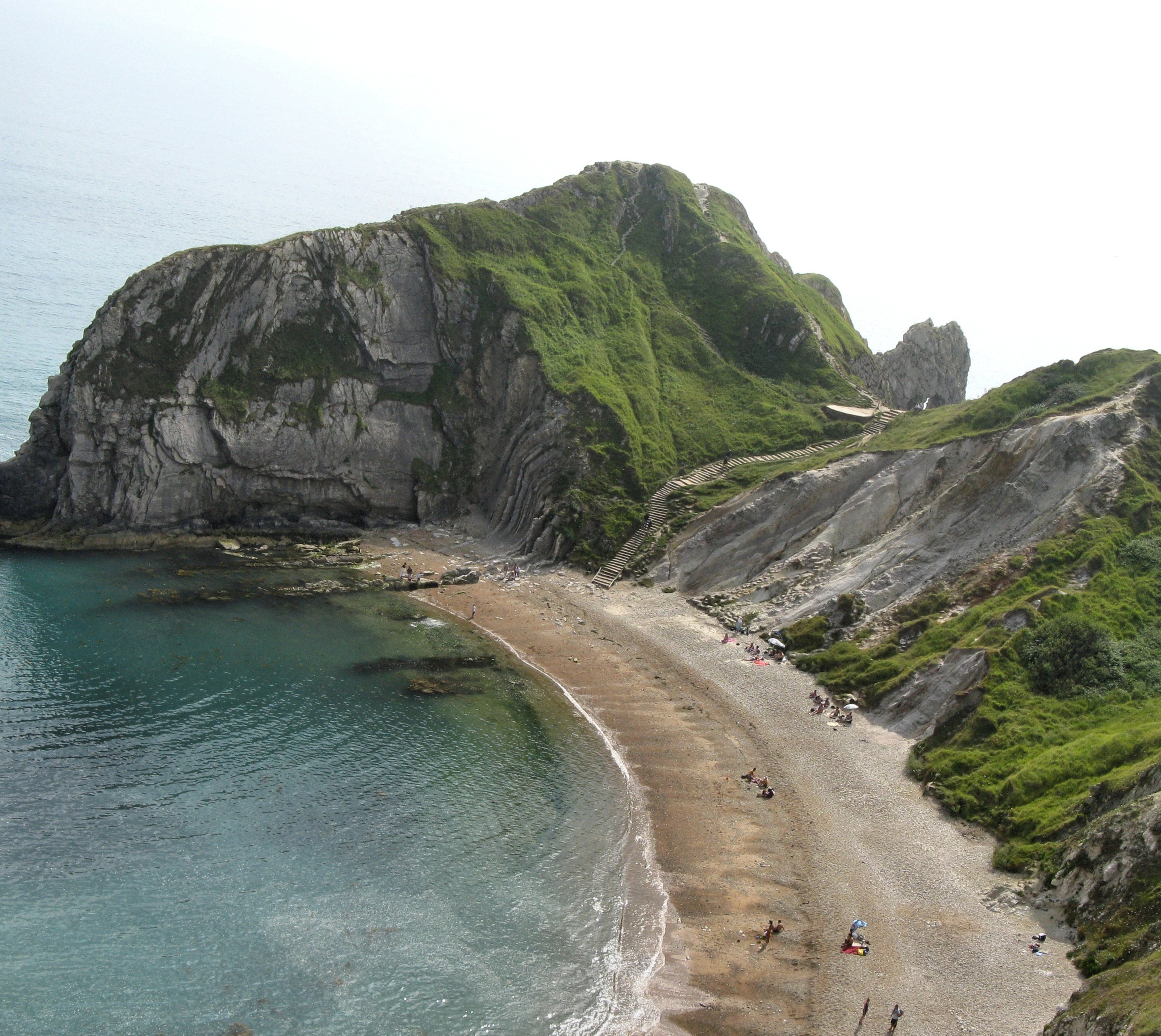
Man o' War Cove from the cliffs. The top of Durdle Door, and a glimpse of its opening, can be seen at the top of the steps.

Man o' War Cove (or Man of War Bay and similar names) lies on the Dorset coast in southern England and is flanked by the rocky, steep and slightly projecting headlands of Durdle Door to the west and Man O War (or O' War) Head to the east. Its name is believed to be a corruption of the Brythonic 'Men-an-Vawr' (The Great Rock)

== Features ==
A line of pronounced rocks takes up the far side of the cove at the distance of the great Durdle Door headland to the east; these partially enclose the cove, and have few submerged components and feature mostly at the east end of the bay — map-recorded as "The Man o' War". The line of exposed rocks continues, very intermittently about 100 metres (110 yards) from the shore as the Norman Rock, Pinion Rock and a cluster around the Ball Stone, along St Oswald's Bay. It is usually possible to walk along a thin strand of high tide, dry sand linking the cove to the rest of St Oswald's Bay an area almost entirely visible from the west side of the cove.

== Definition and local context ==
The UK Ordnance Survey maps have local bay names at 1:50000 and 1:25000; these record the pronounced crescent as Man o' War Cove, in turn forming part of St Oswald's Bay reduced to a long gentle arc to the east, about five times the width of the cove. A technical distinction is possible as to the water rather than the solid features of the crescent, in that the cove the bay encloses is Man o' War Cove. St Oswald's Bay is in turn protected from Atlantic surf by south Devon and by closer Portland Bill forming the multi-cove Weymouth Bay, before the even greater recess of Christchurch or Poole Bay which in its greater definition takes in the area of sea east of Swanage on the Purbeck peninsula.

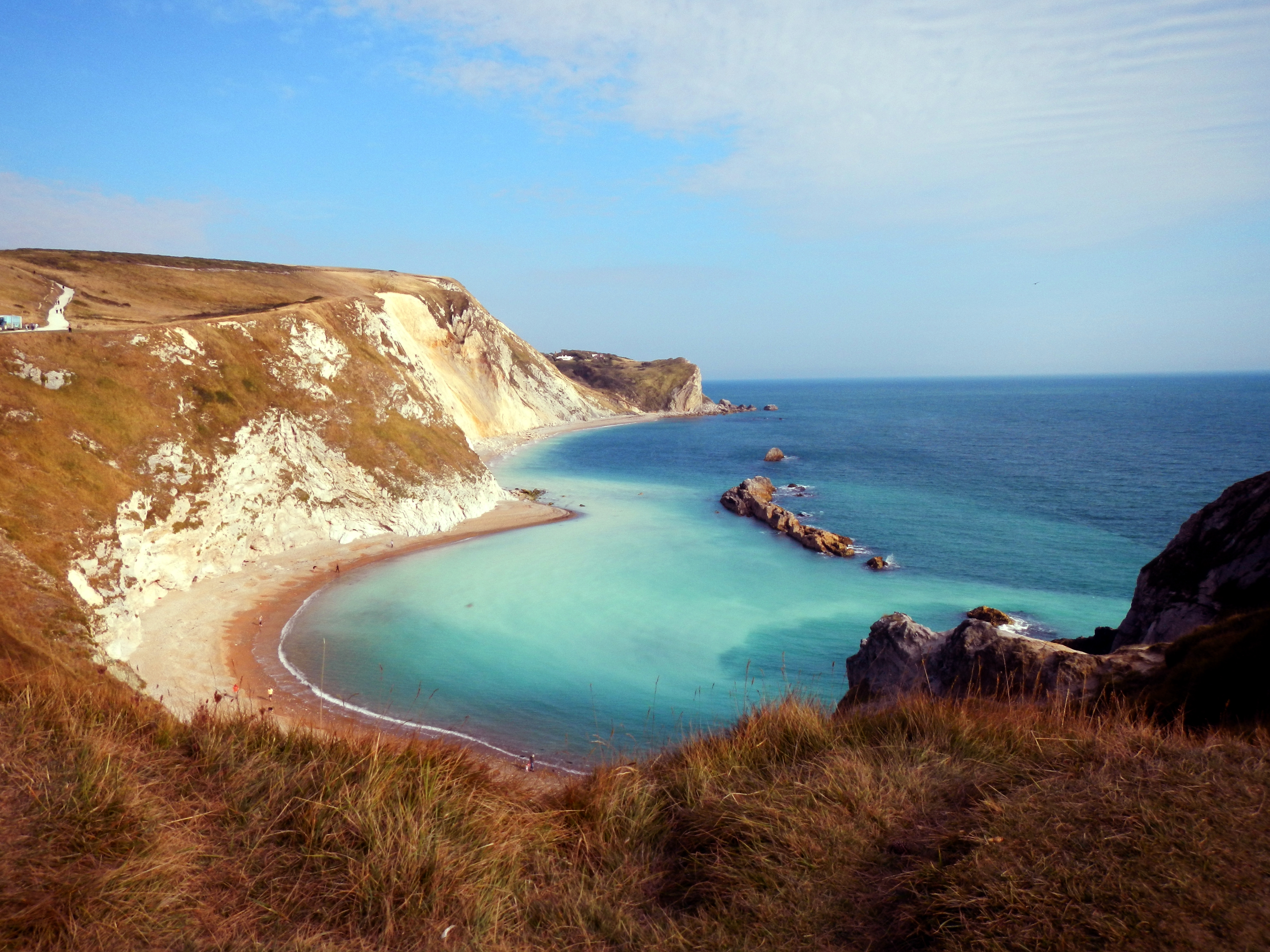
The cove from Durdle Door. The near rocks in the bay are recorded as the Man of War himself. In line with these further along (to the east) are the three sets of named rocks along the rest of St Oswald's Bay

== Access ==
There is a paid car park available 300 metres (330 yards) away from the cove. It is also connected to the South West Coast Path, so it is possible to park elsewhere along the trail and access the cove by foot.

== In popular culture ==
Man o' War Cove was featured in the 2026 science fiction film Project Hail Mary, serving as the location for the alien school at which Ryan Gosling's character teaches.

== See also ==
- Geology of Dorset
- Jurassic Coast
