= Chaldon Hill =

Hill in southern England

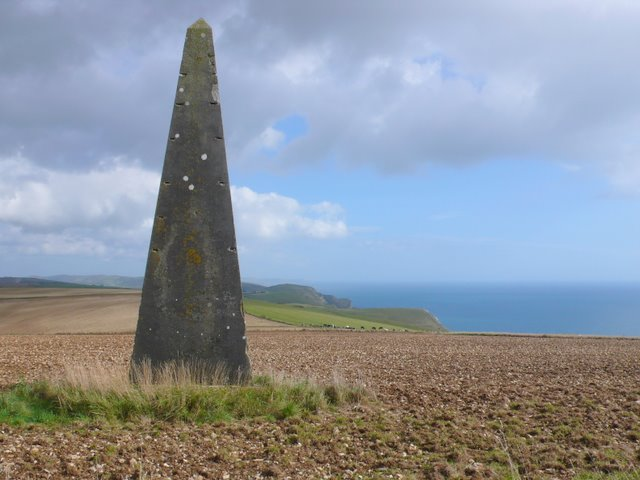
- The old navigation beacon on Chaldon Down, looking east towards Lulworth Cove

Highest point
- Elevation: 178 m (584 ft)
- Prominence: 90 m (300 ft)
- Parent peak: Lewesdon Hill
- Coordinates: 50°37′50″N 2°18′29″W

Geography
- Location: Dorset, England
- Parent range: South Dorset Downs
- OS grid: SY783813
- Topo map: OS Landranger 194

Chaldon Hill, also called Chaldon Down, is one of the highest hills, 178 metres (584 ft), on South Dorset's Jurassic Coast in England. The summit is about 1.5 miles (2.4 km) west of Durdle Door.

A bridleway crosses the hill just below the summit, whilst the South West Coast Path makes its way down the steep hillside to the beach heading for Durdle Door. At the summit is a tumulus and trig point. There are navigation beacons about 200 metres (220 yd) to the southeast. The hill is flanked by two coastal headlands: White Nothe and Bat's Head.

== History ==
There is abundant evidence of prehistoric settlement in the area: tumuli to the south-west and east, a field system and earthwork to the north-east and two named barrows to the east: Wardstone and Bush Barrows. There is evidence of another field system on the steep coastal hillside.

== See also ==
- Chaldon (Surrey)
