= Durdle Door =

Natural limestone arch on the Jurassic coast of England

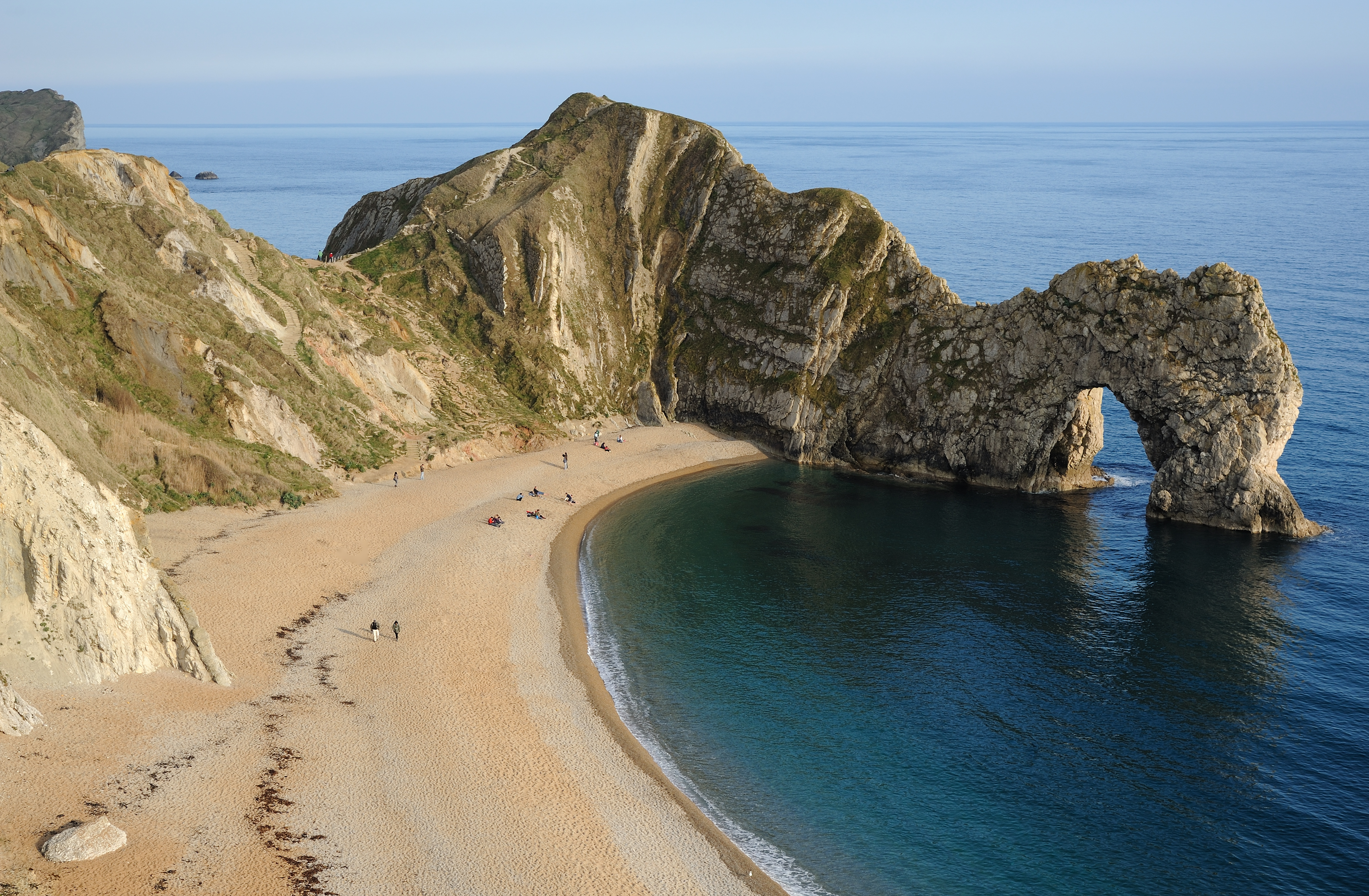
- Durdle Door in Dorset

- Location within Dorset Location within the United Kingdom
- Location: Jurassic Coast
- Nearest town: West Lulworth
- Coordinates: 50°37′16″N 2°16′37″W
- Width: 100 ft (30 m)
- Elevation: 200 ft (61 m)

Durdle Door (sometimes written Durdle Dor) is a natural limestone arch on the Jurassic Coast near Lulworth in Dorset, England. It is privately owned by the Weld family, who own the Lulworth Estate, but it is also open to the public.

== Geology ==
The form of the coastline around Durdle Door is controlled by its geology—both by the contrasting hardnesses of the rocks, and by the local patterns of faults and folds. The arch has formed on a concordant coastline where bands of rock run parallel to the shoreline. The rock strata are almost vertical, and the bands of rock are quite narrow. Originally a band of resistant Portland limestone ran along the shore, the same band that appears one mile along the coast forming the narrow entrance to Lulworth Cove. Behind this is a 120-metre (390 ft) band of weaker, easily eroded rocks, and behind this is a stronger and much thicker band of chalk, which forms the Purbeck Hills. These steeply dipping rocks are part of the Lulworth crumple, itself part of the broader Purbeck Monocline, produced by the building of the Alps during the mid-Cenozoic.

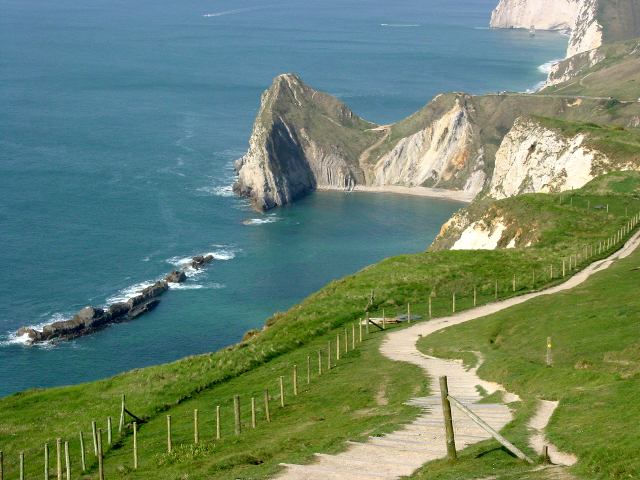
A 'back view' of the Durdle Door promontory from the east, showing the remnants of the more resistant strata in Man O'War Bay

The limestone and chalk are in closer proximity at Durdle Door than at Swanage, 10 miles (16 km) to the east, where the distance is over 2 miles (3 km). Around this part of the coast, nearly all of the limestone has been removed by sea erosion, whilst the remainder forms the small headland which includes the arch. Erosion at the western end of the limestone band has resulted in the arch formation. UNESCO teams monitor the condition of both the arch and adjacent beach.

The 120-metre (390 ft) isthmus that joins the limestone to the chalk is made of a 50-metre (160 ft) band of Portland limestone, a narrow and compressed band of Cretaceous Wealden clays and sands, and then narrow bands of greensand and sandstone.

In Man o' War Cove, the small bay immediately east of Durdle Door, the band of Portland and Purbeck limestone has not been entirely eroded and is visible above the waves as Man O'War Rocks. Similarly, offshore to the west, the eroded limestone outcrop forms a line of small rocky islets called (from east to west) The Bull, The Blind Cow, The Cow, and The Calf.

As the coastline in this area is generally an eroding landscape, the cliffs are subject to occasional rockfalls and landslides; a particularly large slide occurred just to the east of Durdle Door in April 2013, destroying a part of the South West Coast Path.

== Etymology ==
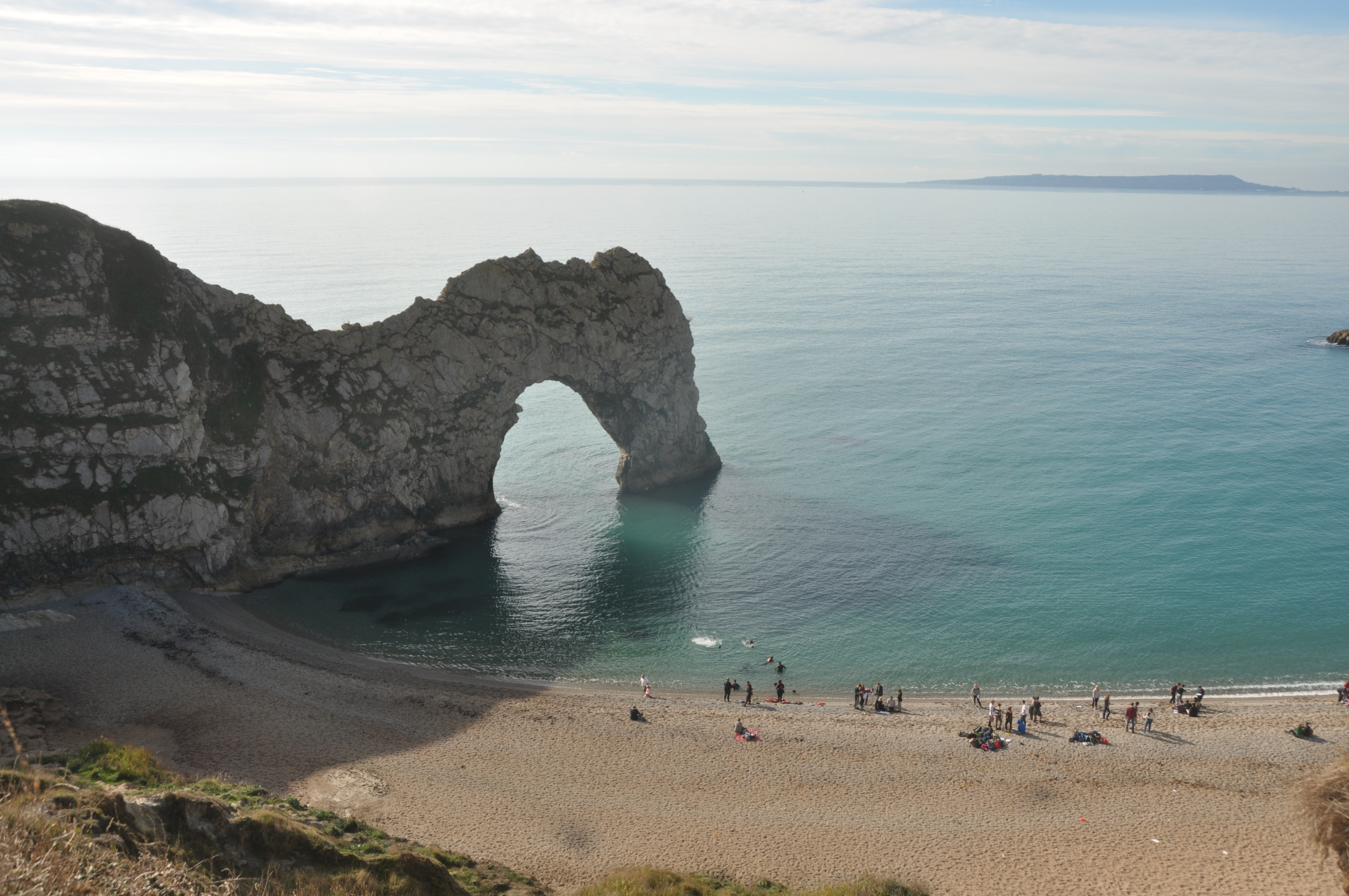
People on the beach show the scale of the arch. The Isle of Portland can be seen on the horizon.

There is a dearth of early written records about the arch, though it has kept a name given to it probably over a thousand years ago. In the late 18th century there is a description of the "magnificent arch of Durdle-rock Door", and early 19th-century maps called it "Duddledoor" and "Durdle" or "Dudde Door". In 1811 the first Ordnance Survey map of the area named it "Dirdale Door". Durdle is derived from the Old English thirl, meaning to pierce, bore or drill, which in turn derives from thyrel, meaning hole. Similar names in the region include Durlston Bay and Durlston Head further east, where a coastal stack suggests the existence of an earlier arch, and the Thurlestone, an arched rock in the neighbouring county of Devon to the west. The Door part of the name probably maintains its modern meaning, referring to the arched shape of the rock; in the late 19th century there is a reference to it being called the "Barn-door", and it is described as being "sufficiently high for a good-sized sailing boat to pass through it."

== In literature and popular culture ==
=== Music ===
Music videos have been filmed at Durdle Door, including parts of Tears for Fears' Shout, Billy Ocean's Loverboy, Cliff Richard's Saviour's Day and Bruce Dickinson's Tears of the Dragon.

=== Film and television ===
The landscape around Durdle Door has been used in scenes in several films, including Wilde (1997) starring Stephen Fry, Nanny McPhee starring Emma Thompson, the 1967 production of Far From The Madding Crowd (the latter also filmed around nearby Scratchy Bottom), the Bollywood film Housefull 3, drama film Steve. In the science fiction adventure film Project Hail Mary Durdle Door is seen as Ryland Grace's home on the alien planet Erid. In 2022, Durdle Door was where the Thirteenth Doctor (Jodie Whittaker) regenerated into the Fourteenth Doctor (David Tennant), in the Doctor Who episode The Power of the Doctor. Ron Dawson's children's story Scary Bones meets the Dinosaurs of the Jurassic Coast creates a myth of how Durdle Door came to be, as an 'undiscovered' dinosaur called Durdle Doorus is magically transformed into rock..

=== Literature ===
Dorset-born Arthur Moule, a friend of Thomas Hardy and missionary to China wrote these lines about Durdle Door for his 1879 book of poetry Songs of Heaven and home, written in a foreign Land:

Shall the tide thus ebb and flow forever?
and for evermore
Rave the wave and glance the ripple through the
rocks at Durdle Door?

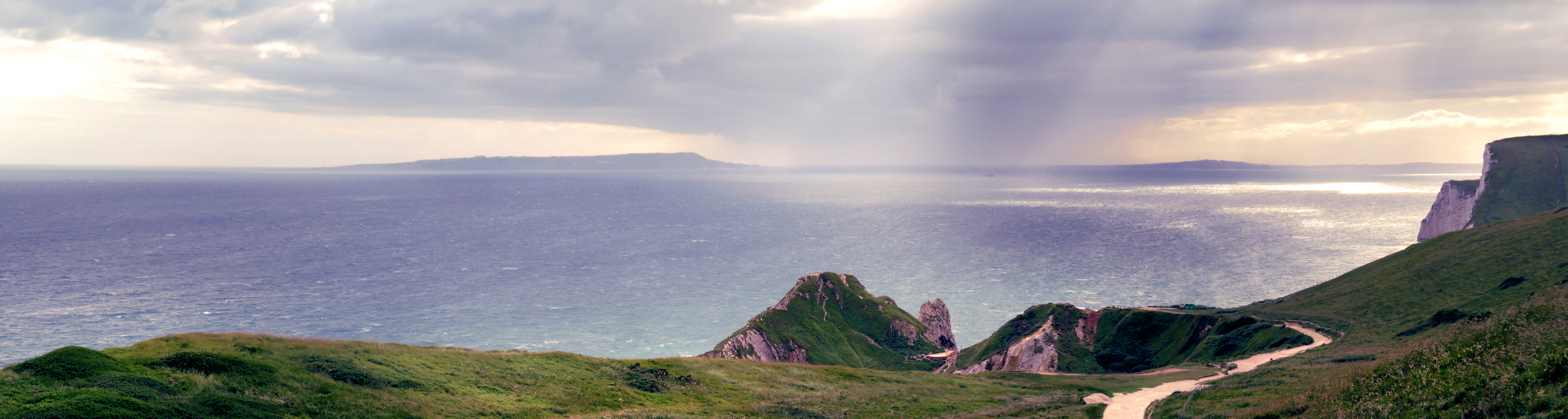
View from cliffs above Durdle Door at dusk with rain approaching over the sea

== See also ==
- Durdle Pier, Isle of Portland
- Geology of Dorset
- Stair Hole
- Swyre Head, Chaldon Down and Bat's Head, to the west
- List of Dorset beaches
