= King's Standing Bowl Barrow =

Scheduled Monument in Birmingham, England

Coordinates: 52.5580°N 1.8827°W

- Kingstanding Mound
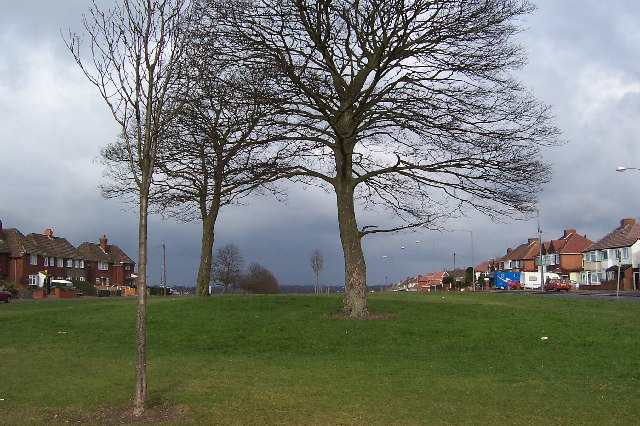
- The barrow in February 2005, looking North
- Interactive map of King's Standing Bowl Barrow
- Type: Bowl barrow
- Location: Kingstanding, Birmingham, England

Site notes
- Management: Birmingham City Council
- Public access: Yes

Scheduled monument
- Designated: 9 October 1981

King's Standing Bowl Barrow or Kingstanding Mound, is a scheduled monument in the Kingstanding area of Birmingham. It comprises the buried and earthwork remains of a bowl barrow from the late Neolithic to the late Bronze Age, lying alongside the Icknield Street Roman road to the South of Sutton Park.

It is reputedly the site from where King Charles I reviewed his troops on 18 October 1642, during the English Civil War; from which event both the mound and the area take their name.
