= Bat's Head =

Chalk headland in Dorset, England

Coordinates: 50.6227°N 2.2910°W

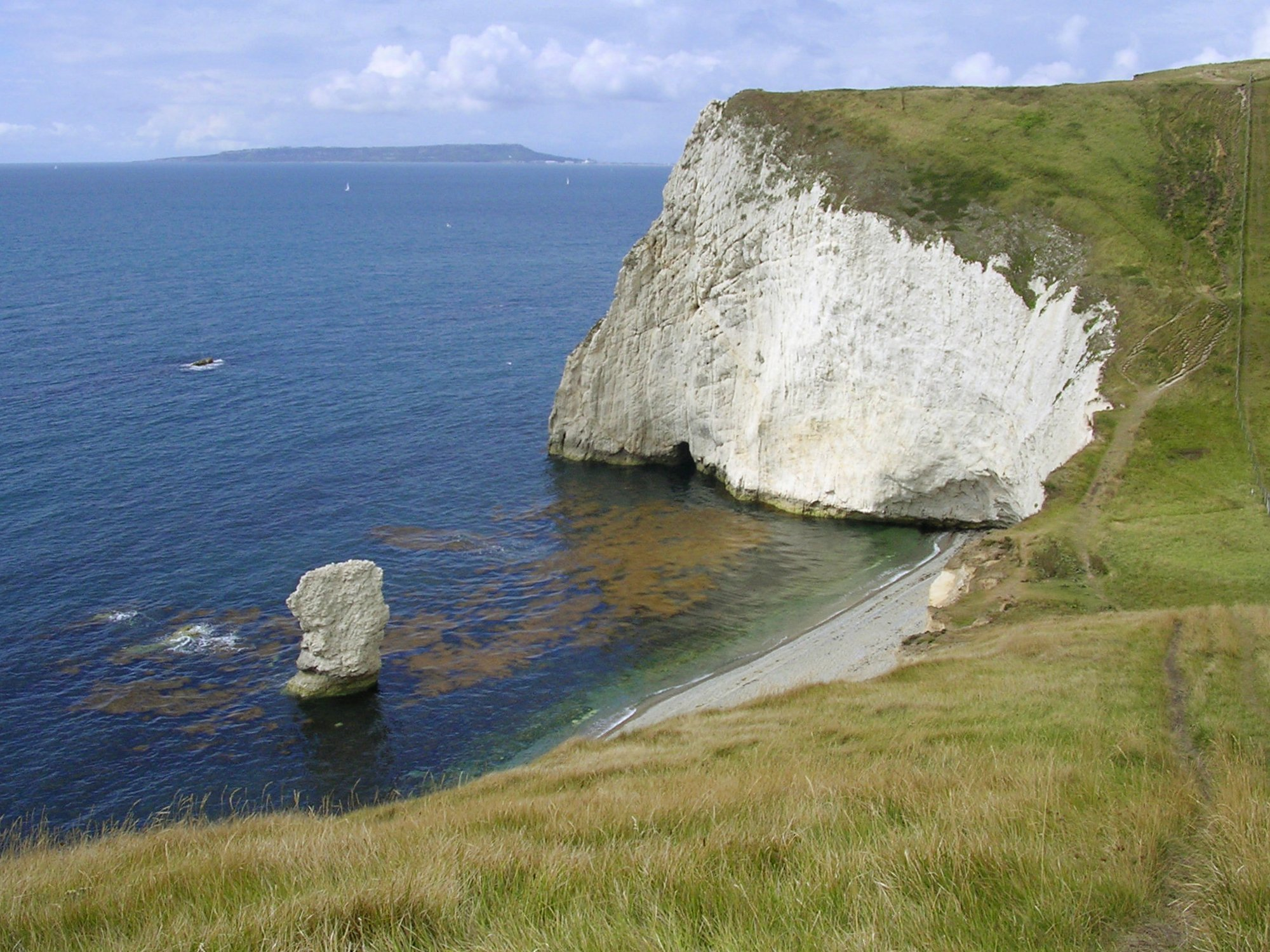
View west towards Bat's Head with the Isle of Portland in the distance.

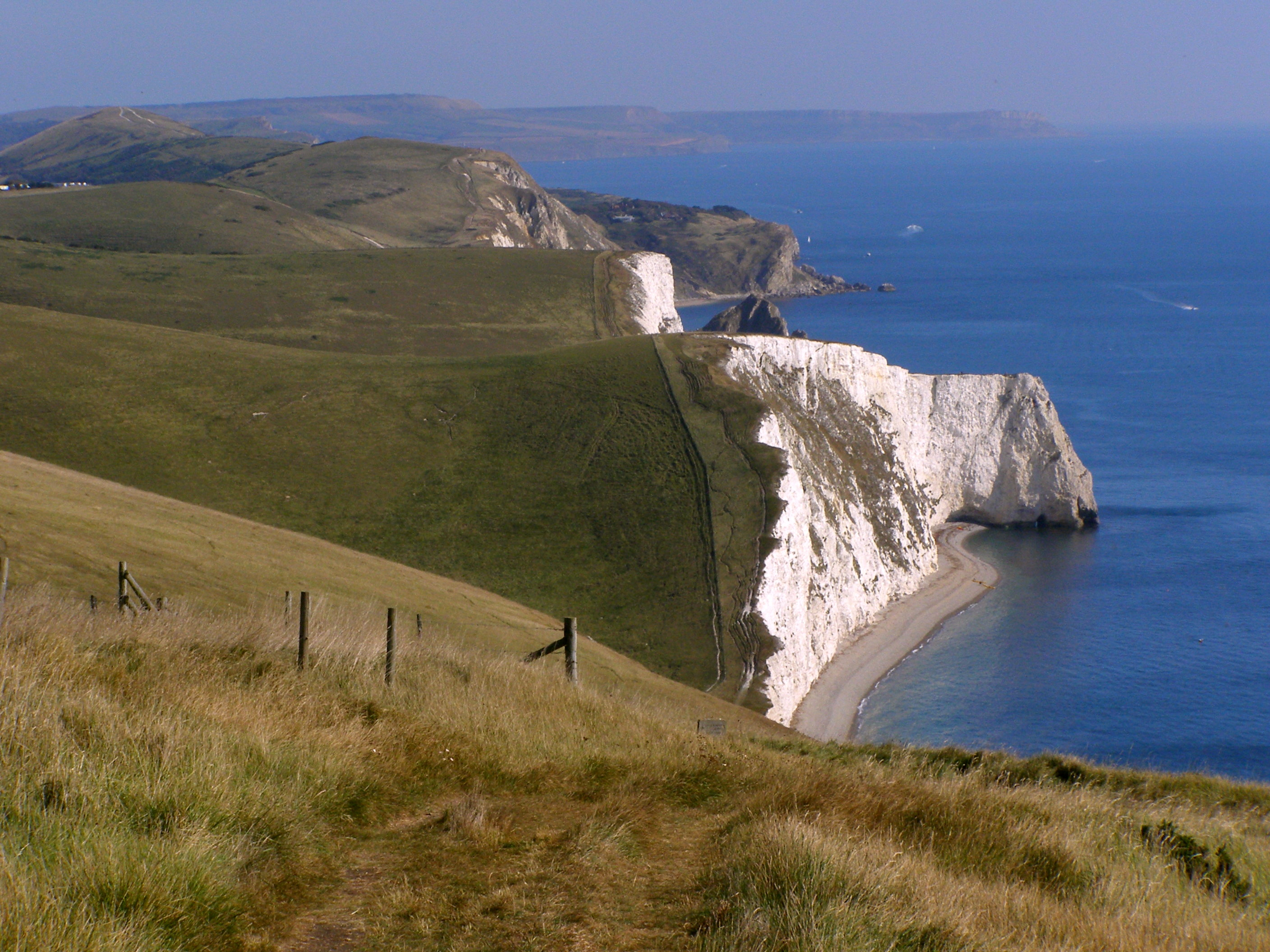
View east towards Bat's Head from White Nothe.

Bat's Head is a chalk headland on the Dorset coast in southern England. It is located between Swyre Head and Durdle Door to the east, and Chaldon Hill and White Nothe to the west. At the base of the headland is the small Bat's Cave.

The chalk in Bat's Head is vertical. Part of the chalk is referred to as Lewes Nodular Chalk Formation, and is part of the "White Chalk Subgroup" of the "Chalk Group".
