= Kingstanding =

Area of Birmingham, England

Coordinates: 52.548°N 1.873°W

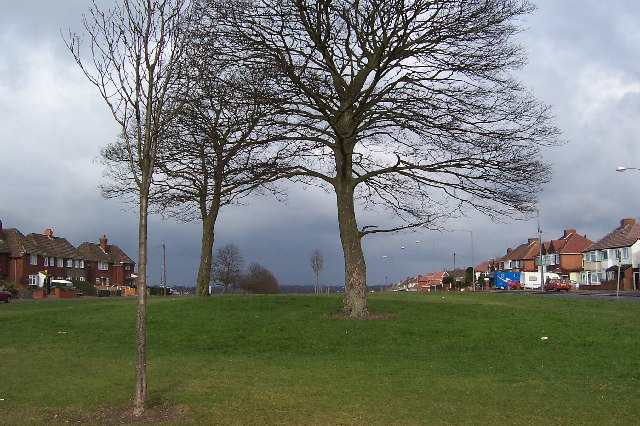
- The barrow at Kingstanding, surrounded by urban housing

- Location within the West Midlands
- Population: 25,334 (2011.Ward)
  - Density: 59.0 per ha
- OS grid reference: SP085945
- Metropolitan borough: Birmingham
- Metropolitan county: West Midlands
- Region: West Midlands
- Country: England
- Sovereign state: United Kingdom
- Post town: BIRMINGHAM
- Postcode district: B44
- Dialling code: 0121
- Police: West Midlands
- Fire: West Midlands
- Ambulance: West Midlands
- UK Parliament: Birmingham Erdington

Kingstanding is an area in north Birmingham, England. It gives its name to a ward in the Erdington council constituency. Kingstanding ward includes the areas; Perry Common, Witton Lakes. The other part of Kingstanding falls under the Oscott ward.

Kingstanding houses a covered drinking water reservoir, Perry Barr Reservoir, on the site of the former Perry Barr Farm.

Kingstanding is served by two libraries; Kingstanding Library and Perry Common Library.

The area known as Kingstanding Circle is where the Kingstanding village centre lies with its shops and Kings Road/ Kingstanding Road roundabout.

Kingstanding.org is the website of Kingstanding Together, a community group promoting history, news, surveys, petitions and local information, championing Kingstanding and its residents.

== History ==
The name of the area is derived from the occasion when the Stuart King Charles I supposedly reviewed his troops standing on the Neolithic Bowl Barrow in the area on 18 October 1642 during the English Civil War, after his stay at nearby Aston Hall. The first references to Kingstanding were as King's Standing.

The course of the Icknield Street Roman Road runs past this barrow; and when the foundations for the water pumping station were being dug in 1884, a hoard of Roman coins was discovered.

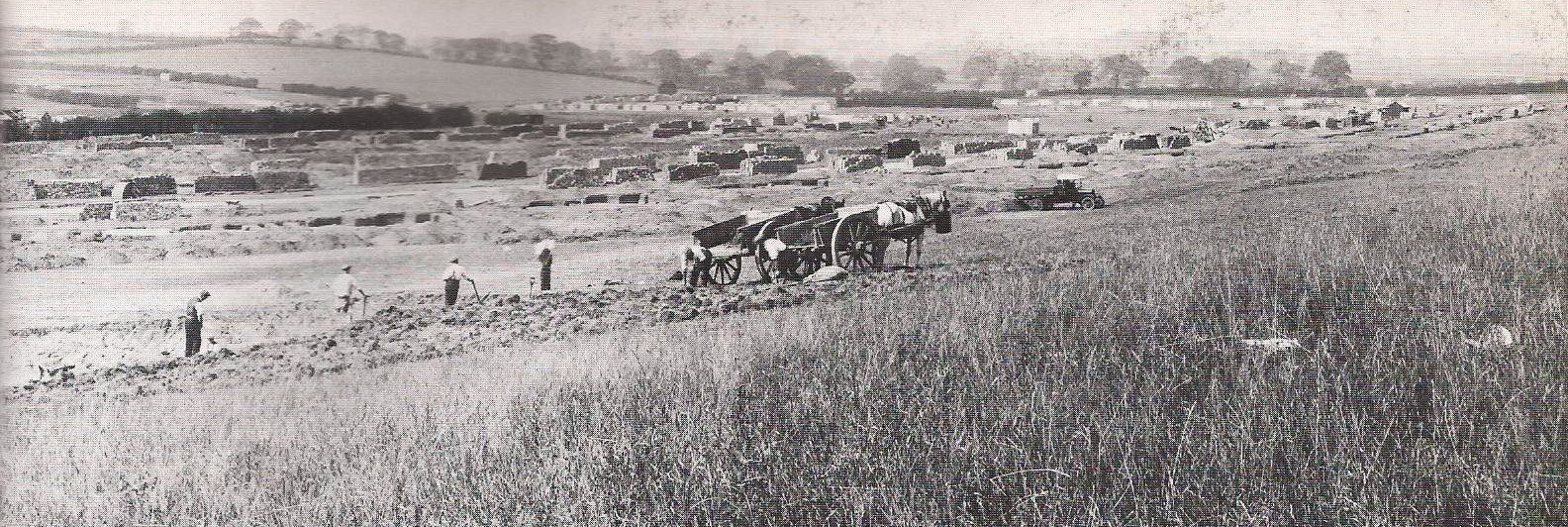
Warren Farm Estate in 1929.

The area was largely rural until 1928, when large-scale residential development commenced in the area. The first of the estates was completed in 1934. It was during the 1930s and 1940s that most of the current housing was built. Most of the houses in Kingstanding were built as council houses in the north of the area. At the time, it was the largest council housing development in Europe, containing some 6,700 properties on its completion.

In 1935, an Odeon cinema, designed by Cecil Clavering, was opened on Kingstanding Circle. On 6 June 1964, Kingstanding Library opened. It had an area of 1,000 sq ft (93 m^{2}) and was identified as being liable to mining subsidence.

Kingstanding is featured in the novel The Last Viking by Dr Ron Dawson. The author grew up at number 79 Parkeston Crescent, and used the estate and its many characters as the backcloth to his Birmingham-based novel.

=== 2022 explosion ===
On 26 June 2022 at around 20:30 BST, a suspected gas explosion occurred on Dulwich Road. It killed one woman and injured five others, one of which was in life-threatening condition. The exact cause of the explosion was due to a gas boiler exploding.

=== Politics ===
The Kingstanding ward was the scene of political controversy in May 2006 when it initially appeared its voters had elected a British National Party candidate, Sharon Ebanks, to Birmingham City Council – the first BNP candidate ever to be elected in Birmingham. However, it was announced by the Returning Officer shortly after the declaration that a counting error had taken place and, following a High Court recount, Ebanks was removed as Councillor on 26 July 2006 and replaced by Labour candidate Catherine Grundy. In 2014 Conservative Gary Sambrook defeated Labour in a by-election, caused by the resignation of Catharine Grundy. In the 2014 local elections Ron Storer also won the seat for the Conservatives from Labour, in what was once a safe Labour seat. They continued to represent the ward until the 2022 Birmingham City Council Election. The ward is currently represented by two Reform UK councillors: Jex Parkin and John Lambert, both elected in the 2026 Birmingham City Council Election.

At the 2019 general election, Gary Sambrook was elected to be the MP for the Birmingham Northfield constituency and remained as the councillor for the ward until the 2022. At the 2022 local election, Ron Storer was elected to be the councillor for the Longbridge & West Heath ward which is in the Birmingham Northfield constituency. At the 2022 Birmingham City Council Election, the Conservative's Rick Payne and Labour's Des Hughes were elected to serve on the Council to represent the ward.

Kingstanding is part of the Birmingham Erdington parliamentary constituency. The current Member of Parliament is Paulette Hamilton of the Labour Party, who was first elected in a by-election in March 2022 following the death of the previous Labour MP Jack Dromey.

== World War II ==
A number of bombs were dropped on the then new Kingstanding housing estate during World War II. On 25 August 1940, four people including a three-year-old boy were killed when a bomb hit a house in Kingstanding Road, while a bomb in Oundle Road killed a 27-year-old man and a third bomb in Hurlingham Road killed a 61-year-old woman. On 26 August 1940, six members of the Birmingham Corporation Gas Department were killed when a delayed action bomb exploded outside 115 Oundle Road whilst they worked to repair damage caused by a bomb the previous night.

== Population ==
According to the estimates of the UK government 2021 population survey, Kingstanding ward has a population of 21,153 people. It has a population density of 5,149 people per km^{2} compared with 4,200 people per km^{2} for Birmingham, the wards host city. Kingstanding's population consists of 10,263 males (48.5%) and 10,900 females (51.5%). Kingstanding's population is formed largely by 18-64 year olds (working age adults), this demographic totals at 12,630 people (59.7%), meanwhile there are 5,638 children aged 0-17 (26.6%) and 2,895 people aged 65+ (13.7%). The ethnic distribution of Kingstanding situates: 14,891 White people (70.4%), 2,537 Asian people (12%), 2,343 Black people (11.1%), 70 Arab people (0.3%), 969 people of mixed ethnicity (4.6%) and 347 people belonging to another ethnicity (1.6%).

== Notable residents ==
- Dr Ron Dawson. Educationist, researcher and author lived in Parkeston Crescent, attended Twickenham Road School, 1945–1951.
- Lloyd Dyer, retired professional footballer who played for the likes of Birmingham City, LeicesterCity and West Bromwich Albion, attended Cardinal Wiseman School between 1994 and 1999
- Alison Hammond, actor and television presenter
- Steve Winwood, rock musician

== See also ==
- Kingstanding Baths
