= Ron Dawson =

Dr Ronald Leslie Dawson
- Born: 1940 (age 85–86); Dudley Road Hospital, Birmingham, England
- Occupations: Special Educational Needs educator; Psychologist; Researcher; Author; Composer Lyricist

Ronald Leslie Dawson (born 1940) is a Special Educational Needs (SEN) educator, psychologist, researcher and author and co-author of numerous books and articles concerning the education of pupils with SEN. His most important publication is The Macmillan Teacher Information Pack (TIPs), a pack of informative materials to assist teachers of pupils with special educational needs in mainstream and special schools. He has also written two novels, six children's story books and a history of Birmingham's first canal. In 2012 he wrote the lyrics and co-composed the music (arranged by Kevin Morgan of the BSO) of "Lest we forget", a song of Remembrance. It was first performed in public on 16 September 2012 by the Wellington Male Voice Choir in the New Zealand Parliament building at the inauguration of New Zealand's Malayan Veterans Day. It has since been performed at Remembrance Services, Concerts and Memorials in the UK, Australia, Canada and Cyprus. In 2014 he wrote the lyrics and co-composed the music (arranged by Kevin Morgan) a novelty dance song "The Brazilian Attack", which was recorded by the Copacabana Brass. He created, wrote, directed and produced the National Children's WW1 Remembrance Concert at the National Exhibition Centre on the 3rd of November, 2018.

== Biography ==
Dawson was born in 1940 at Dudley Road Hospital, Birmingham, the son of Clarice Joan Wheeler. He was adopted aged two by Thomas Dawson, a canal boatman, and his wife, Henrietta of Kingstanding, Birmingham.

- 1956–1965, non-academic employment.
- 1965- Professional educator, researcher and writer.

== Awards ==
- Certificate of Education, (1968, St Peter's College, Saltley)
- Bachelor of Arts (1974, Open University)
- Master of Science (1975, University of Aston in Birmingham)
- Doctor of Philosophy (1981, University of Aston in Birmingham)
- Chartered Psychologist and Associate Fellow of the British Psychological Society (1982)

== Teaching and research ==
- Teacher of maladjusted children.
- Deputy Head Teacher, Special School
- Research Officer for the national Schools' Council Research Project, The Education of Disturbed Pupils (1975–1978)
- Director and Research Psychologist of a five-year research project, the Education of Disturbed Children, (1978–1983). Project funded by Urban Aid and Barnsley Local Education Authority
- Adviser for Special Education, Hampshire LEA.
- Inspector for Special Education, Staffordshire LEA.
- Adviser/Inspector for Special Education, States of Jersey.
- Registered OFSTED Inspector.
- Head of the Special Education and Habilitation Studies Department, principal lecturer at King Alfred's College, University of Winchester

== Significant publications ==
- Disturbed Pupils in Special Schools: First findings from a Schools Council project (1977, Paper presented to the British Association for the Advancement of Science Annual Conference).
- Special Provision for Disturbed Pupils (1980, Macmillan Education, ISBN 0-333-28405-4). Statistical findings and analysis of the project the Schools Council Project, Education of Disturbed Children
- The Teacher Information Packs (Macmillan Education, ISBN 0-333-38438-5) a pack of one-hundred and twenty-three information units designed to assist teachers to work more effectively in relation to pupils across the whole range of special educational needs (SEN). Originator and overall editor of the published version and was the author or co-author of over eighty per-cent of the materials. A number of British LEAs installed TIPs in all of their schools as did a number of overseas countries. TIPs was described as an ‘Opus Magnum’ in the Journal of the Association of Educational Psychologists.
- The Baby Progress Guides (Psycho-Educational Products, 1982), originator, author and co-developer (with Peter Penrose). Pack of assessment and developmental guides and equipment for the parents of infants from birth to two and a half years.
- Handwriting 1, and 2, for the Macmillan Education Success series (ISBN 0333463110, and ISBN 0-333-51308-8).
- Numerous articles and research papers published in academic and research journals, and reports and reviews commissioned by the Times Educational Supplement
- The Dawson File, regular satirical column in Special Children magazine.
- Birmingham's First Canal-1730-1772, 2022 Brewin Books, (ISBN 978-1-85858-746-2)

=== Novels ===
- The Last Viking : The untold story of the world's greatest heist, (2006, Trafford ISBN 1-4120-8683-3, UK Edition 2009 ISBN 978-0-9561732-3-2). (DUKW) tells how a Birmingham gang captured and looted the island of Guernsey in the 1950s. It was optioned for film within a year of its publication.
- The Worm that Flies in the Night: A Diary of Incestuous Love and Serial Murder, (2009, Mulberry Tree Books ISBN 978-0-9561732-0-1) takes its title from William Blake's poem, The Sick Rose. It is the story of a psychopath who is obsessed by the Oedipus myth and kills to gain access to his mother's bed.

=== Books for children ===
The Amazing Adventures of Scary Bones the Skeleton are fantasy stories series for children aged 5 to 12 years:

- The Lost Dog and Bone, 2009, Mulberry Tree Books ISBN 978-0-9561732-1-8
- Scary Bones meets the Pirates of Brownsea Island, 2009 Mulberry Tree Books ISBN 978-0-9561732-2-5
- Scary Bones meets the Dinosaurs of the Jurassic Coast, Mulberry Tree Books, ISBN 978-0-9561732-4-9
- Scary Bones meets the Wacky Witches of Wareham, 2010, Mulberry Tree Books, ISBN 978-0-9561732-5-6)
- Scary Bones meets the Nasty Romans of Maiden Castle 2011, Mulberry Tree Books, ISBN 978-0-9561732-6-3.
- Scary Bones meets the Knights and Dragon of Durlston Head 2013, Mulberry Tree Books, ISBN 978-0-9561732-7-0.

== Sources ==
- Wilson, M and Evans, M. (1980), Education of Disturbed Children. London: Schools Council/Methuen.
- Rose, M. (1991) History of King Alfred's College, Winchester. Stroud: Phillimore and Co. Ltd.
- British Psychological Society, (1990), The Register of Chartered Psychologists: Leicester: BPS.
- Brooks, T (1985) Foreword to the Teachers Guide : The Macmillan Teacher Information Pack: Macmillan.
- www.trombonemusic.co.uk.
- 'The Brazilian Attack' Notification ID EJNW-160614-0991-00 Tune code 148909KN.
- 'Play Honours forgotten war heroes', The Times, August 5th 2017.
- 'The Programme for Lest we Forget, the National Children's WW1 Remembrance Concert', NEC November 3, 2018.
- 'https://www.youtube.com/watch?v=GkjWob0s12w&t=4813s'
