= Dungy Head =

View west from the Dungy Head promontory across St Oswald's Bay

Dungy Head is a coastal promontory located west of Lulworth Cove on the Jurassic Coast in Dorset, England. It forms the eastern end of St Oswald's Bay. It is composed of Portland stone strata. The surrounding area is popular for coastal walks, which yield impressive views. Cliff-climbing however is dangerous and not recommended.

== Pinion Rock ==
Pinion Rock (50.6188°N 2.2642°W) is a rock that lies out to sea close to Dungy Head.
