= Burnt mound =

Type of archaeological site

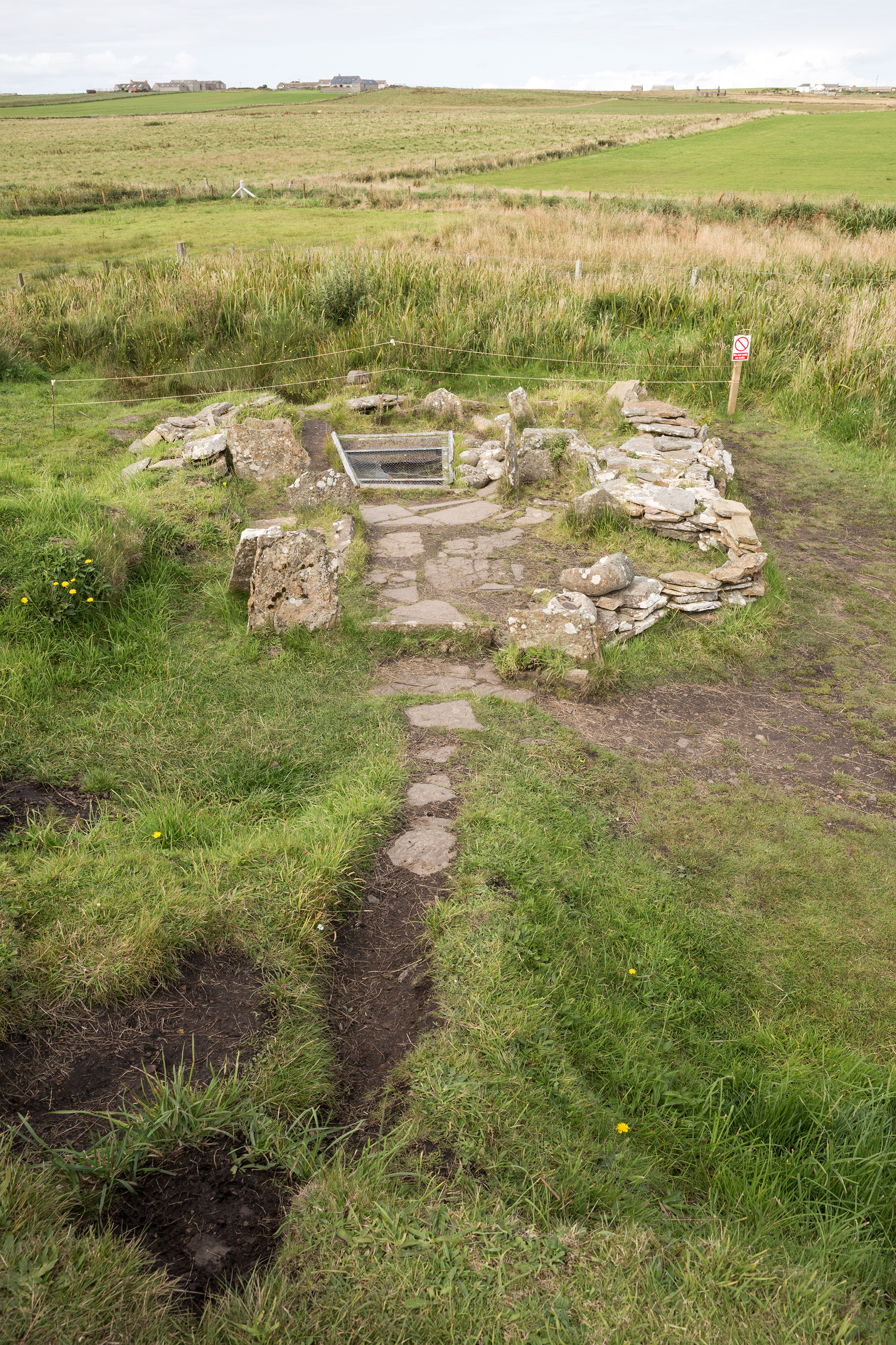
A burnt mound in the Orkney Islands

A burnt mound is an archaeological feature consisting of a mound of shattered stones and charcoal, normally with an adjacent hearth and trough. The trough could be rock-cut, wood-lined or clay-lined to ensure it was watertight. Radiocarbon dates vary quite widely, the earliest being Late Neolithic, with clusters of dates between 1900 and 1500 BC and 1200–800 BC, with some outliers in the Iron Age. There are also some dates that go into the Early Middle Ages. The technology used at burnt mounds has much greater antiquity and is found from the Palaeolithic onward.

== Description and creation ==
The shattered rock fragments are thought to be the remains of stones heated in fires, which were used to heat water. The shattering of the rock appears to have been the result of thermal shock when the heated stones were dropped into liquid, normally believed to be water.

The mound is assumed to result from the periodic clearing out of the trough, with the stone fragments and charcoal being cast up into a mound. The mound is frequently a crescent shape, which is seen as being the result of the upcast.

There has been considerable debate about the time required to create the mounds. Some interpretations posit the rapid accumulation of material, as a trough was used intensively and very frequently; others suggest a slower accumulation, where the trough was used occasionally over a long period of time. One thesis is that mounds were created at hunting sites; this explanation would most likely result in the latter pattern of accumulation, while the former would suggest that the use of the trough was for an essentially domestic purpose.

== Locations ==
=== Great Britain and Ireland ===
The vast majority of burnt mounds are found in the uplands of Great Britain, and in Ireland where they are called fulachtaí fia. Recognised from the nineteenth century onward, they attracted little significant interest until the 1980s. In Ireland they are often found in low-lying ground close to water. In Britain, they appeared to have a distribution pattern confined to the higher ground. However, this may be illusory, as examples have been found at lower altitudes during linear route excavations. The reason that they had not been recognised before was that the mounds have been ploughed out, although the trough may partially survive and there will be layers of the burnt mound material surviving as a spread of material. The mixture of burnt and shattered rock with charcoal, labelled as burnt mound material, is found on occasion without the trough. There are settlement sites on Orkney, where the burnt mound material is found as thick layers , but there is no trough to explain the shattering of the rocks.

The upland bias in distribution in Great Britain has led to a suggestion that they were cooking sites for hunting parties, and there are images from Medieval Irish texts that appear to show this. The burnt mounds are always adjacent to water courses, and there can be several instances along the same burn or stream.

The implication found in many accounts of burnt mounds gives the impression that they are found in Ireland and Scotland, but they also are found in Wales and in England. The Welsh examples tend to be upland and rural, as are many of the English ones, but there are also many found in the lowlying English Midlands.

=== Other locations ===
Burnt mound material has also been found elsewhere in northwestern Europe, such as in Sweden and Switzerland.

== Possible purposes ==
It is not necessarily the case that all burnt mounds were created for the same purposes, and it would be a mistake to seek a single explanation for all burnt mounds and burnt mound material. Similar sorts of material has been produced all over the world, and there may be a range of explanations.

=== Possible use for bathing ===
Barfield & Hodder interpreted burnt mounds as possibly places for bathing in heated water or steam, based on their discoveries of structures that could have involved tents and broken stones next to streams in the Birmingham area. One example is in Moseley Bog where experiments were made in the late 1990s to assess the plausibility of the sauna hypothesis. A related thesis, that has been proven possible by experiments in Moseley Bog, is that the hot stones would be transported from the fire (possibly by use of deer antler) to a rectangular pit lined with large flat stones and full of water. The hot water or steam could then be used for a variety of purposes - bathing being just one option.

=== Cooking ===
Burnt mounds are also hypothesized to have been used as cooking sites. There are descriptions of the use of such places for cooking in some of the early Medieval tales, although the historicity of these accounts is open to question. The process has been found to work; experiments were carried out in Ireland in the 1950s to show that a joint of meat could be fully cooked in about three to four hours through this method.

However no burnt mounds have been found with any direct evidence of cooking. Bone is rarely if ever reported from burnt mound sites, which would be unusual for a cooking site. This has been explained as the result of the soils being too acidic for the bone to be preserved, but it would be unlikely that all of the soils relating to burnt mounds were so acidic that no bone survived, particularly as the pH of the soil will vary considerably from site to site, and there are also examples of burnt mounds that have been recorded on neutral or basic soils, without bone being apparent in the burnt mound material, In addition some mounds occur in places which are believed to have never been inhabited, but this may be explained as cooking by hunting parties or those who were outlawed from living near permanent settlements.

=== Other purposes ===
Several other purposes have been suggested. A possible non-domestic purpose is salt production. More domestic purpose suggestions are heating water for bathing, dyeing or leather treatment, fulling, and the making of ale.

== See also ==
- Fulacht fiadh
