= Yellow Buses =

Former bus operator in Bournemouth, England

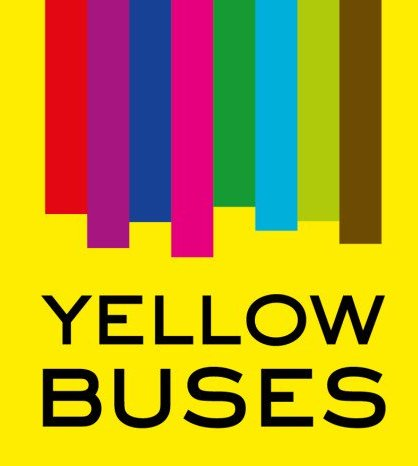

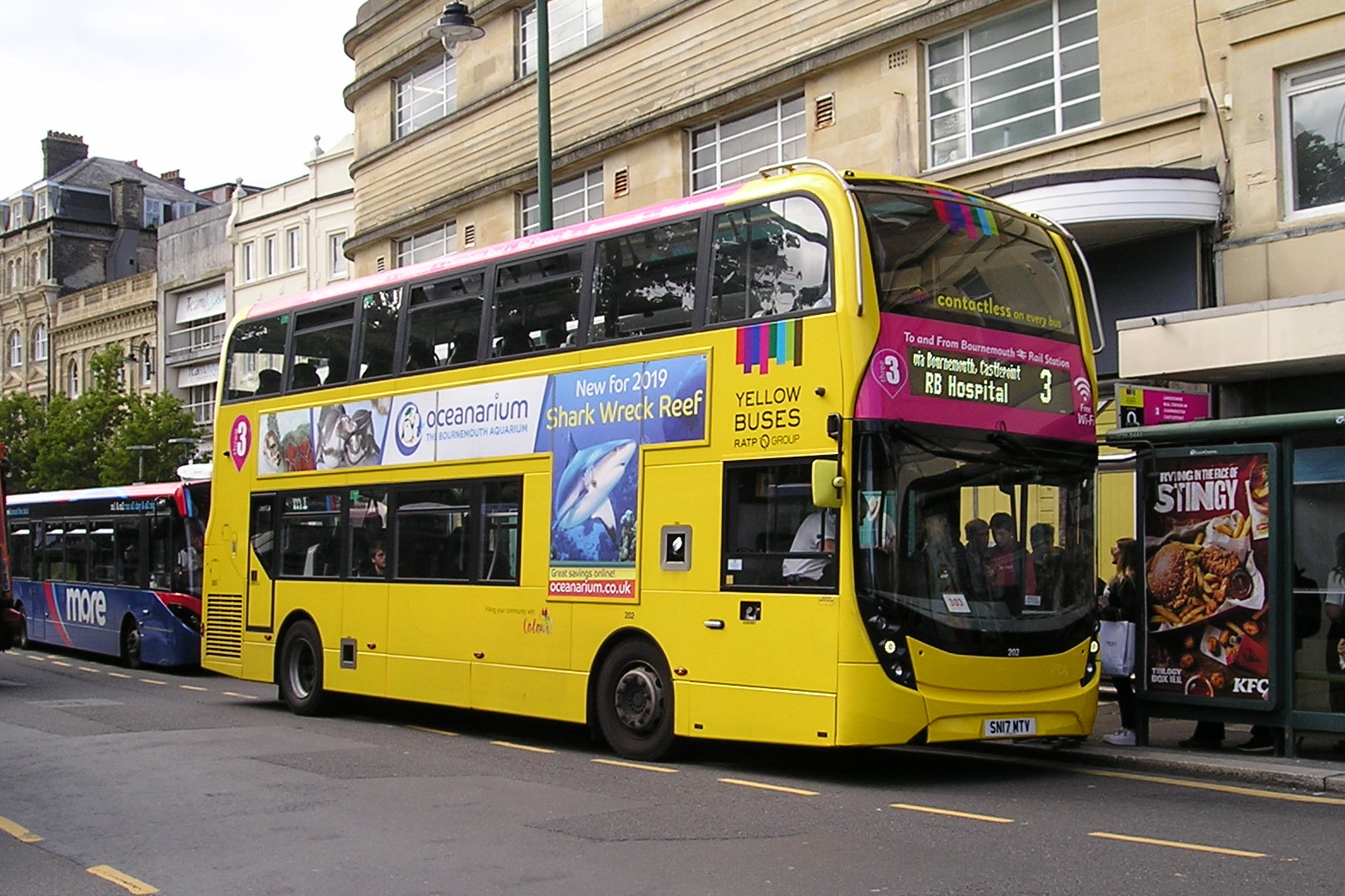
- Alexander Dennis Enviro400 MMC in Bournemouth in 2019
- Parent: Simon Newport (33.3%); Phil Pannell (33.3%); David Squire (33.3%)
- Founded: July 1902; 123 years ago
- Ceased operation: 4 August 2022; 3 years ago
- Headquarters: Bournemouth
- Service area: Dorset
- Service type: Bus services
- Routes: 24 (Not including school routes)
- Depots: Bournemouth - Yeomans Way
- Fleet: 131
- Chief executive: David Squire
- Website: www.yellowbuses.co.uk

Yellow Buses was a bus operator based in Bournemouth, on the south coast of England. Yellow Buses was the trading name for Bournemouth Transport Ltd. The company fell into administration in July 2022 and ceased operations on 4 August 2022.

== History ==
=== Origins ===
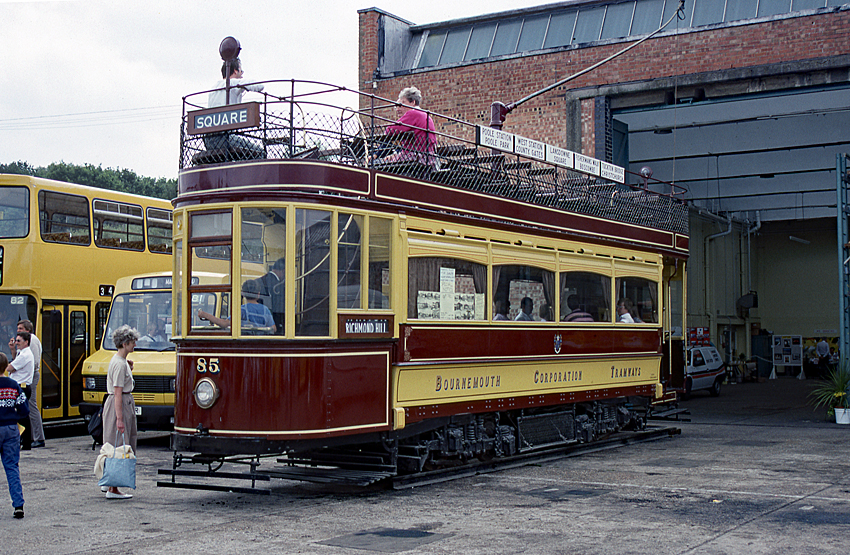
Bournemouth Tram No 85

Yellow Buses traces its origins to July 1902, when Bournemouth Corporation began operating trams. Bus services commenced in 1906 to act as feeders to the tram system. In 1930 more bus services were started away from the tram system, to serve Kinson and Holdenhurst when those areas were added to the borough of Bournemouth.

In 1933 the corporation began to operate trolleybuses, and by 1936 replaced all the trams with trolleybuses. The trolleybuses were replaced by buses between 1963 and 1969.

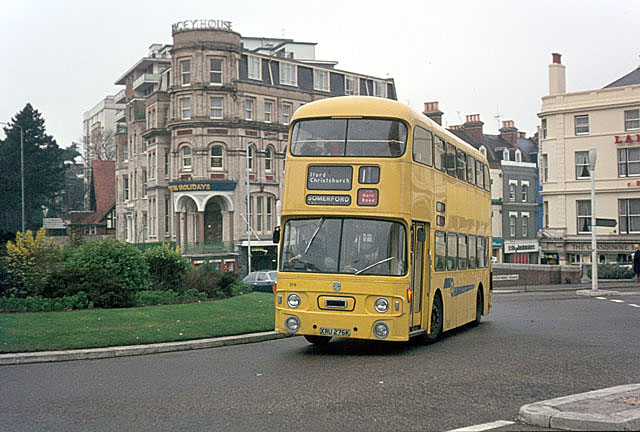
Alexander bodied Leyland Atlantean in March 1976

=== Bournemouth Transport Limited ===
With the passing of the Transport Act 1985 and subsequent deregulation of bus services, Yellow Buses was incorporated as a private limited company, Bournemouth Transport Limited. All shares in the limited company were owned, however, by Bournemouth Borough Council. In 2005, with a need to modernise the fleet and a realisation that full privatisation would better equip the operator to overcome the increasing competition it was facing from Wilts & Dorset, the Council offered the company for sale.

=== Transdev ===
Yellow Buses logo used between 2005 and 2009

In December 2005 Bournemouth Borough Council sold 90% of the shares in Bournemouth Transport Limited to Transdev. The Council retained a 10% shareholding. The operation was rebranded as Transdev Yellow Buses.

Transdev then decided to make its mark on Yellow Buses by giving the network a complete overhaul. This became the Big Network Change of 2 July 2006, where each bus, each journey, and each route (even route numbers) was changed. To make sure that the public were made aware of these changes, Transdev Yellow Buses held road shows across Bournemouth, Poole and Christchurch to publicise its new network, livery, branding and new fare structure. Transdev subsequently made slight changes to the network with funding from Bournemouth Borough Council, including the introduction of routes 37 and 38, the extension of route 41 at both ends to Boscombe Pier and to Throop Church, and the re-introduction of route 24 to Bournemouth, also restoring this route's evening service and its Sunday service between Bournemouth Railway Station and Alum Chine. Also, for the first time in recent years, Transdev Yellow Buses decided not to run services on New Year's Day 2007 except route 747, which ran a normal Monday service.

In April 2010 services were expanded into East Dorset with the launch of the hourly route 29 between Bournemouth, Winton, Ferndown and West Moors.

=== RATP Group ===
Yellow Buses logo used between 2009 and 2017

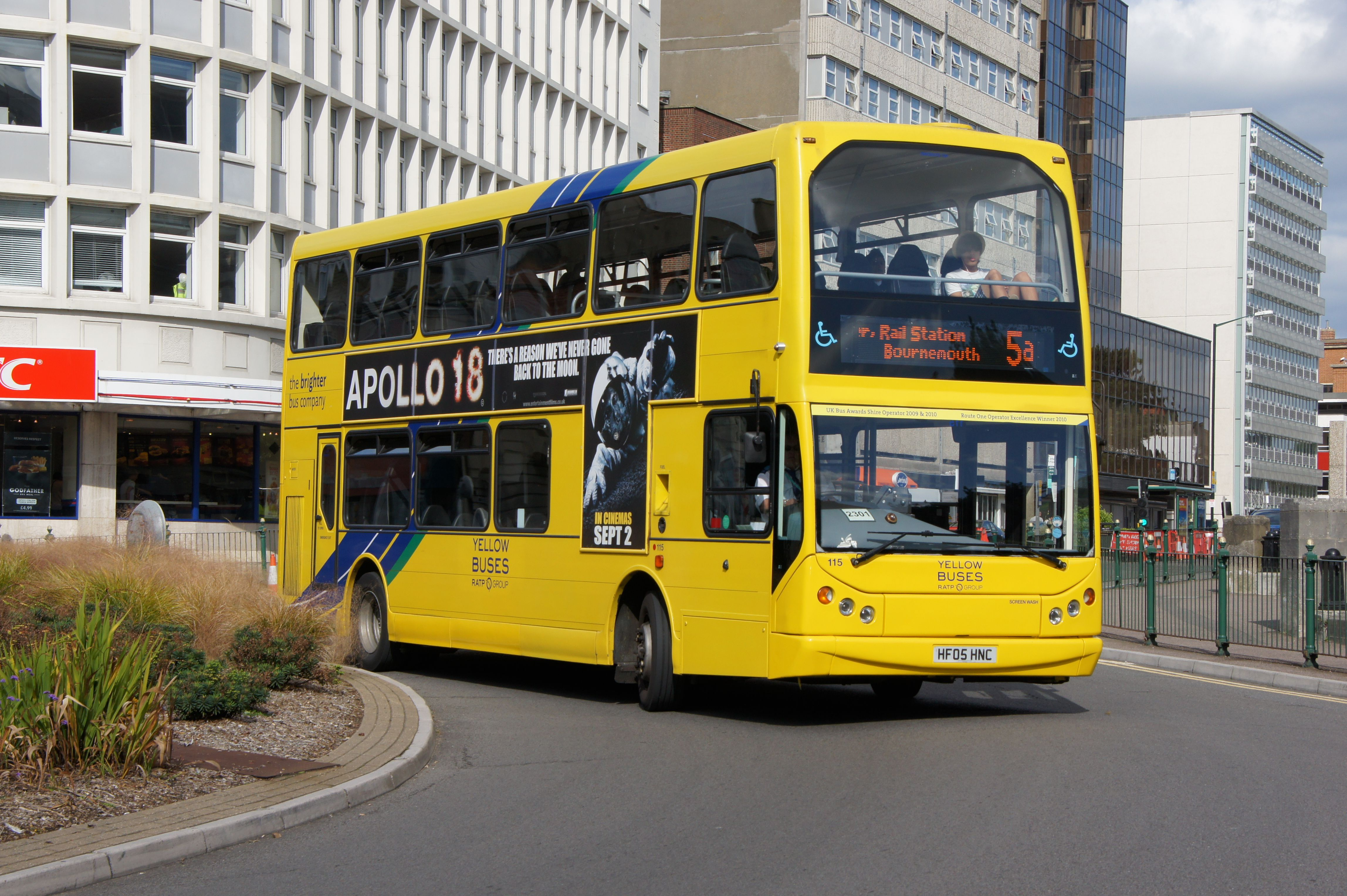
East Lancs Myllennium Vyking bodied Volvo B7TL in August 2011

In 2009 Transdev's majority owner, Caisse des dépôts et consignations, commenced negotiating with Veolia Environnement to merge Transdev with Veolia Transport. As part of the resulting agreement, it was agreed that the RATP Group, which had a minority shareholding in Transdev, would take over ownership of some of Transdev's operations in lieu of cash payment. Transdev Yellow Buses was included and was transferred on 3 March 2011. The business resumed trading as Yellow Buses.

On 16 November 2013 the A1 (Airport Shuttle) once again become a Yellow Buses route, after six years of being operated by Discover Dorset. In 2016, RATP Group purchased the 10% shareholding in Bournemouth Transport Limited that it did not already own.

=== 2017 route changes and financial losses ===
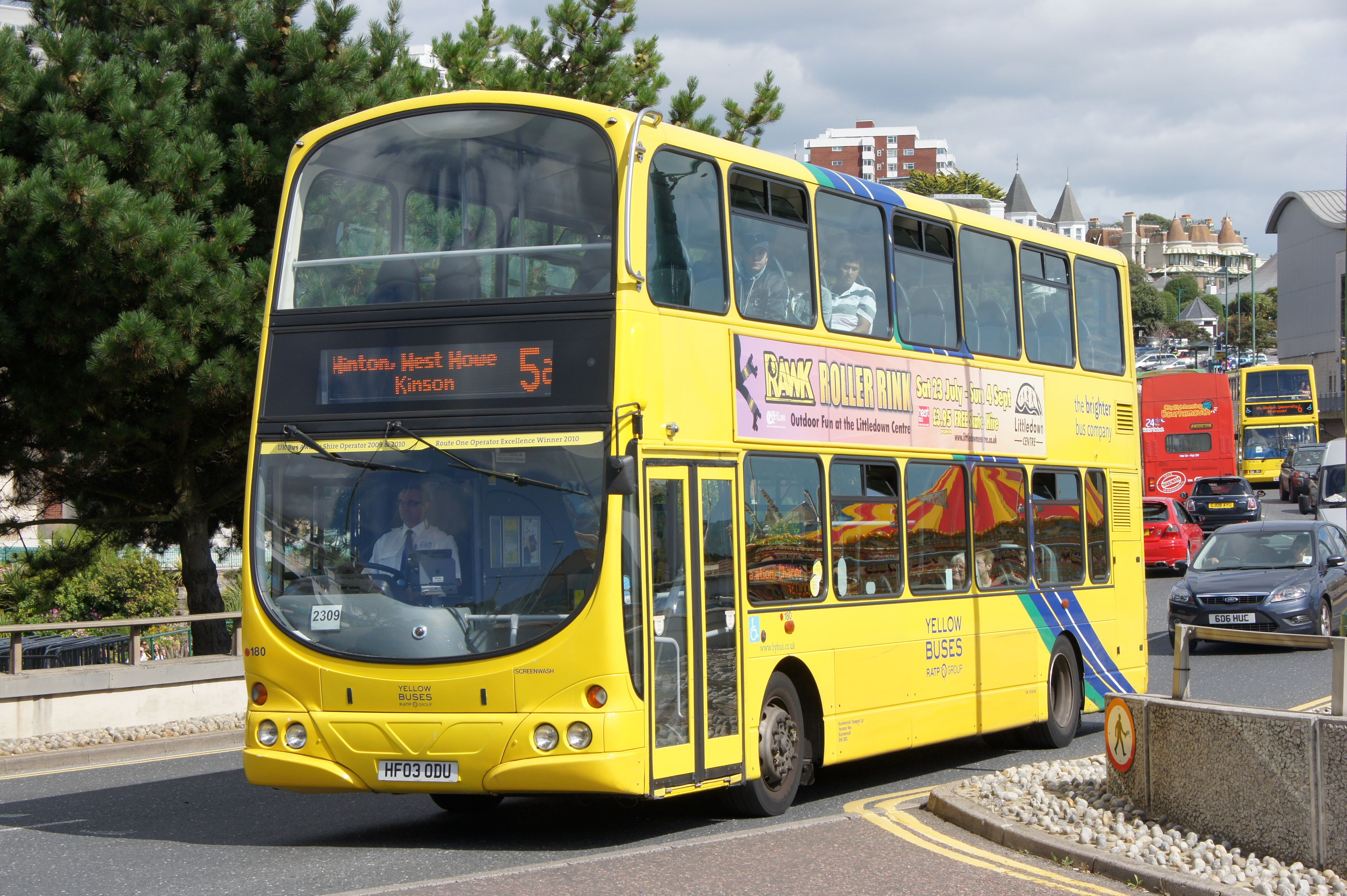
Wright Eclipse Gemini bodied Volvo B7TL

In January 2017, Yellow Buses announced it was reorganising most of its routes "after extensive research into the life and work patterns of passengers". The 1a, 1b and 1c services between Poole and Christchurch were replaced with new 'P' services ('P' standing for 'Priory', denoting Christchurch Priory) and ceased to run along Christchurch Road, taking a more lengthy route via Holdenhurst Road. Other lettered services included 'B' for 'Bourne', 'U' for 'University', and 'V' for 'Kinson Village'. The new routes, and the rushed introduction of the new timetables, led to scores of complaints from passengers and in October that year, Bournemouth Transport Limited, which owned and ran Yellow Buses, posted pre-tax losses of £124,000 at Companies House (generating a loss after tax of £193,000). Andrew Smith, the managing director, announced his resignation days after the accounts were published.

=== Further financial losses and 2019 buy-out ===
In early 2018, it was announced that Yellow Buses would be reverting to an earlier route-name format - '1', '1a', '1b' and so on - these changes coming into effect on 8 April 2018. This necessitated painting and rebranding the company's entire fleet of 140 buses and updating the timetable information at more than 1,000 stops. David Squire, who had replaced Andrew Smith as MD, said: "Everything is in place for Sunday's launch of our revised network. It has been a tremendous team effort and I think our 15 million passengers will notice a positive difference in our services from April 8." The company continued to post losses at Companies House, however, generating pre-tax losses of £1,818,000 in the year ending 30 December 2017 and further losses of £1,975,000 in the year to 31 December 2018. On 2 July 2019, following a review of its operations, RATP Group sold Bournemouth Transport Limited to the three directors of the latter company in a management buyout.

In the months following the management buyout, Yellow Buses further incurred financial losses, losing £2.65 million over 15 months leading to March 2020, said to have been caused by the replacement of computer systems and the cost of the management buyout from the RATP Group. In the February of the same year, Yellow Buses stopped using Poole Bus Station due to anti-social behaviour in the area.

=== Administration ===
Two years after difficulties in attempting to recover from the COVID-19 pandemic, the company fell into administration in July 2022, citing loss in revenue and an increase in running costs for the business. Yellow Buses ceased operations on 4 August 2022 with bus services operated by the company cancelled, with some of its key routes taken over by morebus.

Yellow Coaches was purchased by Xelabus of Eastleigh on 5 August, though its operations ceased in February 2023 with their tender for its services expiring the same month. The National Express Group purchased the intercity coaching and engineering operations of Yellow Buses from administrators Milsted Langdon on 8 August.

== Services ==
At the time the company ended operation, it ran the following routes in Bournemouth and surrounding area:

- 1, 1b: Poole - Bournemouth - Christchurch
- 1a: Bournemouth - Somerford - New Milton
- 2: Bournemouth - Castlepoint - Bearwood
- 3: Westbourne - Royal Bournemouth Hospital
- 3x: Poole Hospital - Royal Bournemouth Hospital (express service)
- 4: Bournemouth - Royal Bournemouth Hospital - Somerford
- 5, 5a: Bournemouth - Kinson
- 6: Bournemouth - Bearwood - Wimborne
- 6h: Royal Bournemouth Hospital - Wimborne
- Buster's Beach Bus: Alum Chine - Hengistbury Head
- Buster's New Forest Explorer: Christchurch - Ringwood
- 18: Bournemouth - Broadstone
- 33: Bournemouth - Christchurch
- 36: Talbot View - Kinson
- 727: Boscombe - Aviation Business Park
- 737: Bournemouth - Bournemouth Airport Terminal

Morebus (previously Wilts & Dorset) took over the routes 1/1b, 1a, 2, 4, 5/5a, 6, 18, 33, 36 and 737 above, and the remainder ceased operation.

However, following the retendering process, the council-subsidised routes 18, 33 and 36 were transferred to Yellow Coaches starting from 15 August, while on the same weekend, morebus started running the route 12 (Alum Chine - Hengistbury Head) again, which had been replaced by the Buster's Beach Bus since April 2022 under Yellow Buses' operation.

== Fleet ==
A large part of the Yellow Buses fleet was made up of both Alexander-Dennis and Wrightbus-bodied Volvo buses, as well as 16 to 53-seater coaches in the Yellow Coaches subdivision. As of 2021, the company operated 131 buses and coaches.

== See also ==
- List of bus operators of the United Kingdom
