= Dorchester Hospital =

Former hospital in England

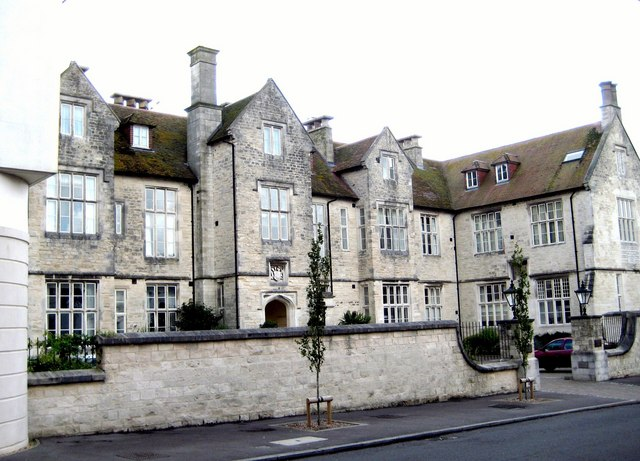
- The Dorchester Hospital

- Shown in Dorset

Geography
- Location: Dorchester, Dorset, England, United Kingdom
- Coordinates: 50.7142°N 2.4391°W

Organisation
- Care system: Public NHS
- Type: General

Services
- Emergency department: No Accident & Emergency

History
- Founded: 1840
- Closed: 1998

Links
- Lists: Hospitals in England

The Dorchester Hospital was a hospital in Dorchester, Dorset, England. It served the local area for many years before being replaced by the newer Dorset County Hospital in 1998. It was managed by the West Dorset General Hospitals NHS Trust.

== History ==
The hospital was founded in 1840 as the Dorset County Hospital and the first purpose-built buildings, designed by Benjamin Ferrey, were completed in 1841 south of Princes Street in the town centre. During the 20th century the novelist Thomas Hardy and the surgeon Sir Frederick Treves provided financial support to the hospital. It joined the National Health Service in 1948. The facility, which was latterly known as the Dorchester Hospital, became in need of replacement and, after services had been transferred to Dorset County Hospital, it closed in 1998. It has since been converted into apartments.

== See also ==
- Dorset County Hospital
- Healthcare in Dorset
- List of hospitals in England
