= Christchurch Hospital, Dorset =

Christchurch Hospital
- University Hospitals Dorset NHS Foundation Trust
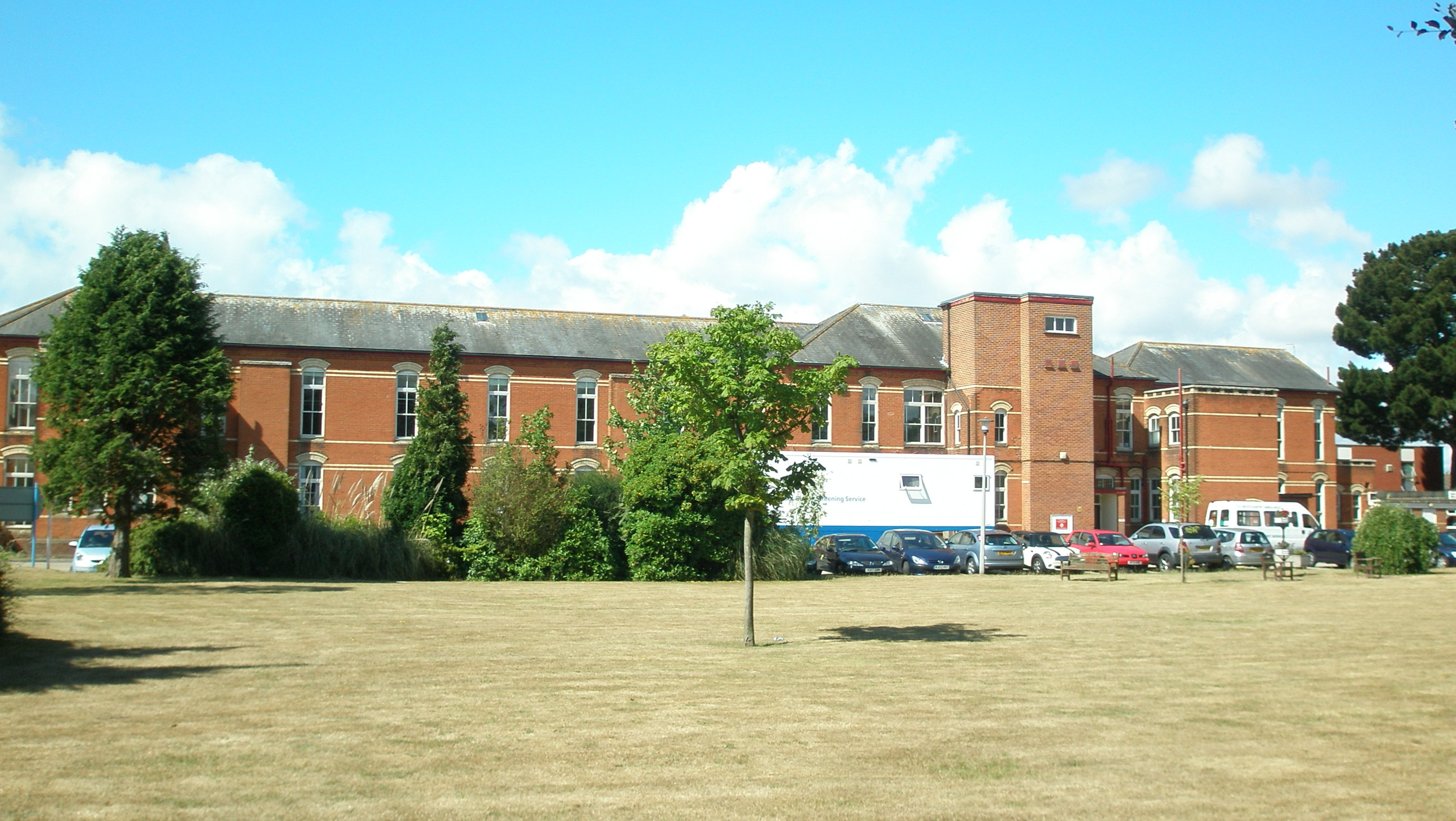
- Christchurch Hospital

- Location in Dorset

Geography
- Location: Christchurch, Dorset, United Kingdom
- Coordinates: 50°44′40.79″N 1°47′25.5″W

Organisation
- Care system: Public NHS
- Type: Specialised - rehabilitation

Services
- Emergency department: No Accident & Emergency

History
- Founded: 1882

Links
- Website: www.uhd.nhs.uk/hospitals-christchurch
- Lists: Hospitals in the United Kingdom

Christchurch Hospital is run by the University Hospitals Dorset NHS Foundation Trust. It is located in Fairmile in Christchurch, Dorset, England. The hospital was managed by The Royal Bournemouth and Christchurch Hospitals NHS Foundation Trust until the merger with Poole Hospital NHS Foundation Trust on 1 October 2020.

== History ==
The hospital has its origins in a workhouse infirmary built in 1882. New infirmary blocks were built at the north end of the site in 1913 and were used by the Red Cross during the First World War. The hospital joined the National Health Service in 1948 and, after the Royal Bournemouth Hospital opened in 1989, the site was rationalised and part of the site was sold for housing in 1995. It has subsequently developed as a centre for rehabilitation. The Secretary of State for Health, Alan Milburn, awarded the hospital's stroke service Beacon status in 2000. Various acute services were transferred from Christchurch Hospital to the Royal Bournemouth Hospital in 2010.

== Services ==
An all-age rehabilitation service is available, though most patients are elderly. To support rehabilitation there are physiotherapy and occupational therapy facilities. There is a day hospital, a dermatology resource unit, rheumatology, and a Macmillan unit (palliative care).

== Other hospitals in group ==
- Poole Hospital
- Royal Bournemouth Hospital

== See also ==
- Healthcare in Dorset
- List of hospitals in England
