= Royal Bournemouth Hospital =

- University Hospitals Dorset NHS Foundation Trust
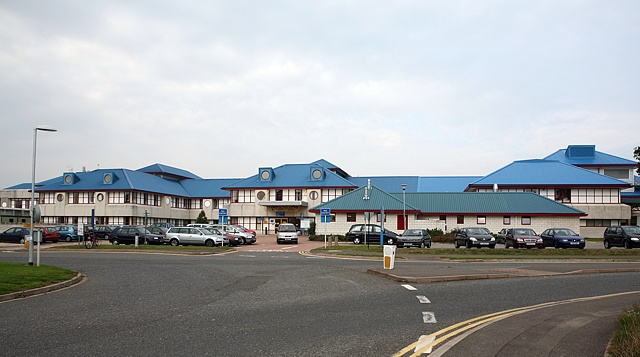
- Royal Bournemouth Hospital

- Shown in Dorset

Geography
- Location: Bournemouth, Dorset, England
- Coordinates: 50°44′52.4″N 1°49′18.71″W

Organisation
- Care system: NHS
- Type: General

Services
- Emergency department: Yes
- Beds: 723

History
- Founded: 1989

Links
- Website: www.uhd.nhs.uk/hospitals-bournemouth
- Lists: Hospitals in England

The Royal Bournemouth Hospital is an acute general hospital in Bournemouth, Dorset, England. It is managed by the University Hospitals Dorset NHS Foundation Trust. The hospital was managed by The Royal Bournemouth and Christchurch Hospitals NHS Foundation Trust until the merger with Poole Hospital NHS Foundation Trust on 1 October 2020.

== Location ==
The hospital is located a short distance from the Wessex Way (A338) in Castle Lane East (A3060) in Bournemouth. It is served by bus routes operated by Morebus. Bournemouth railway station is approximately 1.5 miles (2.4 km) from the hospital.

== History ==
The first phase of the hospital, which replaced the Royal Victoria Hospital, (Note: Sixteen of the original W. B. Simpson tile panels from the Royal Victoria Hospital may be found, mounted on the stairs of the hospital. The panels, which date from 1910, show nursery rhymes and fairy tales.) opened in 1989. A second phase of the hospital was opened by Princess Anne in 1992. A Cardiac Intervention Unit was opened in April 2005 and the Derwent Hospital, a 28-bed unit previously operated as a private hospital, was purchased in 2007.

Various acute services were transferred from Christchurch Hospital to the Royal Bournemouth Hospital in 2010.

On 3 November 2021, a ceremony was carried out to mark the start of construction work on building a new wing. The project is part of a £250 million reorganisation of healthcare in Dorset.

On 6 May 2022, Charles, Prince of Wales opened a lavender garden at the hospital dedicated to hospital staff who died during the COVID-19 pandemic.

In 2023, the Royal Bournemouth Hospital became the NHS’s first healthcare facility in the United Kingdom to have a section of its hospital under construction using AI technology developed by Buildots, an Israeli AI software platform that analyzes data captured at a building site through 360-degree cameras mounted on helmets.

The new six-storey BEACH building (Births, Emergencies And Critical Care, Children’s Health) was completed in early 2025 with teams moving in from March 2025.

== Services ==
It has a 24-hour accident & emergency department. It also provides district-wide services for vascular surgery and urology. Outpatient clinics are provided for oral surgery, paediatrics, plastic surgery, ENT (ears, nose and throat), cardiothoracic and neurology.

It is also the home to a diabetic unit called BDEC, which treats and educates local patients diagnosed with all types of diabetes. They also run specialised groups, one of those being the YPDS, for young people aged between 16 and 23, supporting them between the children's team and the adult team.

Now that the BEACH building is mostly operational, Maternity services are now available at RBH rather than Poole. With Children's Health still at Poole Hospital until the moves have been completed.

== Performance ==
The independent regulator, the Care Quality Commission (CQC), rated the Royal Bournemouth Hospital as "Requires Improvement" overall in March 2. The findings of the report are summarised in the table below:

	Safe	Effective	Caring	Responsive	Well-led	Overall
Urgent and emergency services	Good	Good	Good	Good	Outstanding	Good
Medical care	Good	Good	Good	Good	Good	Good
Surgery	Requires Improvement	Good	Good	Good	Requires Improvement	Requires Improvment
Critical care	Good	Good	Good	Requires improvement	Good	Good
Maternity and gynaecology	Requires Improvement	Good	Good	Good	Requires Improvement	Requires Improvment
Services for children and young people	Good	Good	Outstanding	Good	Good	Good
End of life care	Good	Good	Good	Good	Good	Good
Outpatients and diagnostic imaging	Good	Not rated	Good	Good	Good	Good
'Overall'	Requires Improvement					

== Porters ==
A 12-minute film entitled Porters made by students from Newport Film School at the hospital in 2015, told the story of the hospital's porters. It won a number of awards and was added to the British Film Institute's national archives.

== Other hospitals in group ==
- Christchurch Hospital, Dorset
- Poole Hospital

== See also ==
- Healthcare in Dorset
- List of hospitals in England
