= Dorset County Hospital =

- Dorset County Hospital NHS Foundation Trust
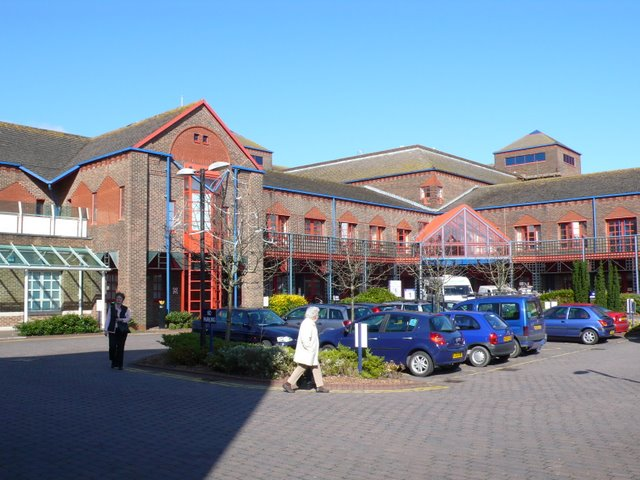
- Dorset County Hospital

- Location in Dorset

Geography
- Location: Williams Avenue, Dorchester, Dorset, England
- Coordinates: 50.7127°N 2.4456°W

Organisation
- Care system: National Health Service
- Type: District general

Services
- Emergency department: Yes
- Beds: 500

History
- Founded: 1998

Links
- Website: www.dchft.nhs.uk

Dorset County Hospital is a district general hospital in the town of Dorchester, Dorset, England. The hospital is managed by Dorset County Hospital NHS Foundation Trust.

== History ==
Plans were developed in the early 1980s for a modern facility to replace the old Dorchester Hospital at a new site to the west of the town centre, on the land between Damers Road and Bridport Road. Construction took place in phases with the first phase on the north part of the site completed in the late 1980s under the name of West Dorset County Hospital. The second phase on the south part of the site completed in the mid-1990s at which time the whole site became the Dorset County Hospital. The hospital was officially opened by the Queen on 8 May 1998. An upgraded cardiac unit with new cardiology equipment opened in 2012.

== Notable patient ==
- Keith Floyd – English TV presenter and restaurateur died there after a heart attack in 2009.

== See also ==
- Healthcare in Dorset
- List of hospitals in England
