= Dorset County Hospital NHS Foundation Trust =

NHS foundation trust based in Dorchester, England

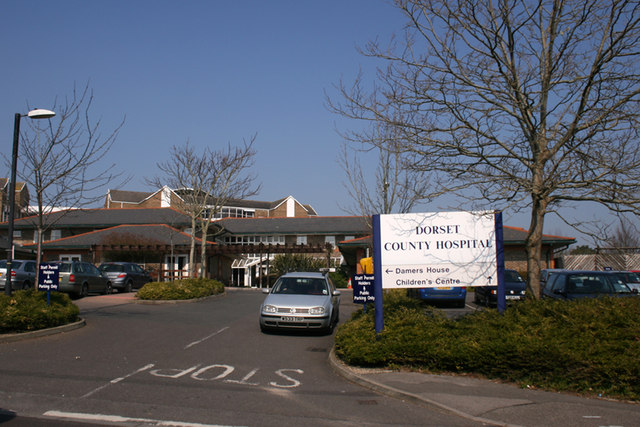
- Dorset County Hospital, managed by Dorset County Hospital NHS Foundation Trust
- Former name: West Dorset General Hospitals NHS Trust
- Type: NHS foundation trust
- Established: 1 June 2007
- Headquarters: Williams Avenue; Dorchester; DT1 2JY
- Hospitals: Dorset County Hospital
- Chair: David Clayton-Smith
- Chief executive: Matthew Bryant
- Staff: 4,194 (2023/24)
- Website: www.dchft.nhs.uk

Dorset County Hospital NHS Foundation Trust runs Dorset County Hospital, an NHS district general hospital in the town of Dorchester, Dorset, England. The hospital is the hub of the district's inpatient facilities but community hospitals, formerly owned by the North and South West Dorset primary care groups are situated in the surrounding major towns and provide the 'spokes' to the central unit. Dorset County Hospital has 500 beds.

== History ==
On the 1 April 1991, West Dorset General Hospitals NHS Trust started operating services provided by the then named West Dorset County Hospital now known as Dorset County Hospital. The Trust became a foundation trust on 1 June 2007, changing its name to Dorset County Hospital NHS Foundation Trust.

== Performance ==
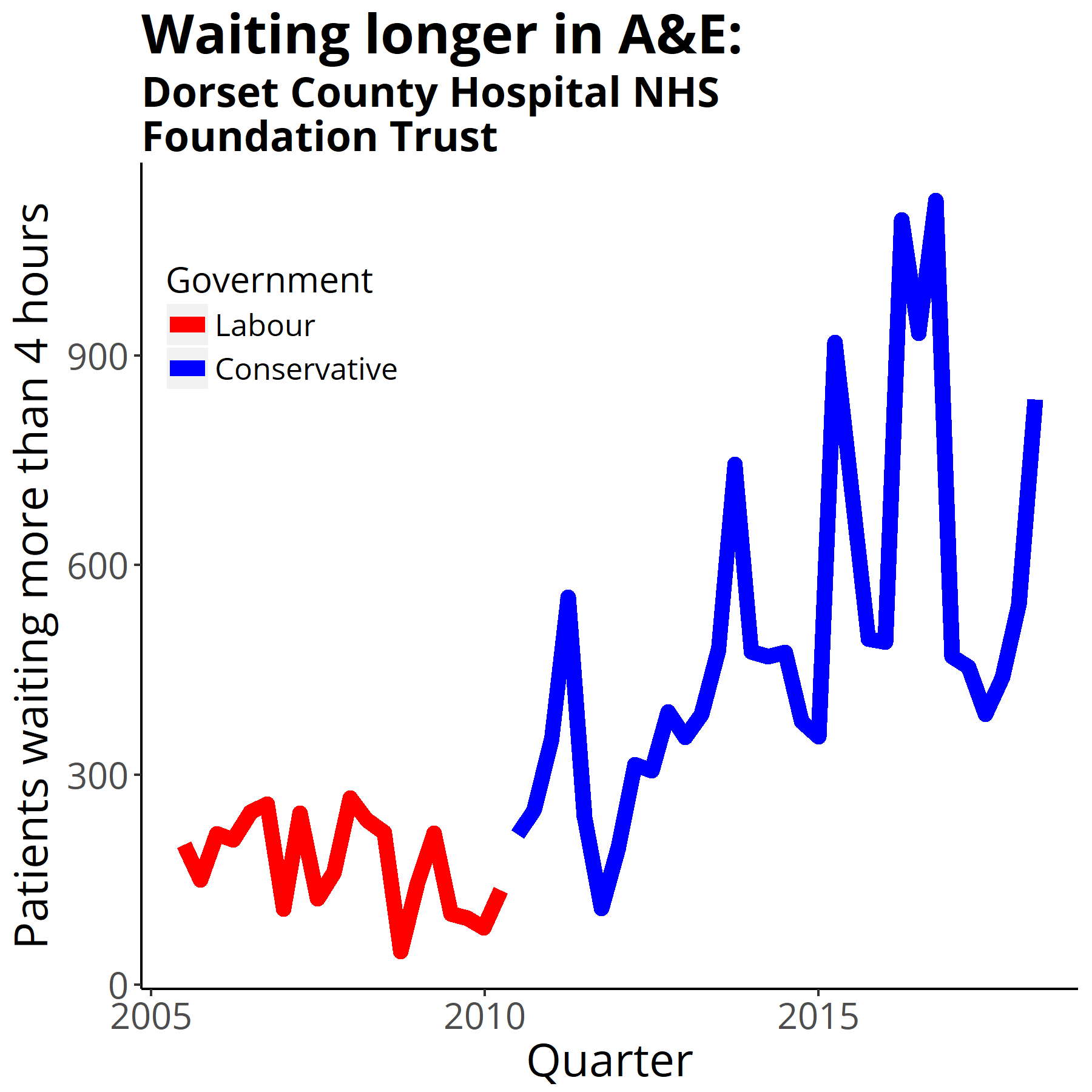
Four-hour target in the emergency department quarterly figures from NHS England Data from https://www.england.nhs.uk/statistics/statistical-work-areas/ae-waiting-times-and-activity/

In the Sunday Times Good Hospital Guide 2004, West Dorset's patient satisfaction rating is bettered by only one trust in England and it scores well with respect to most of the other performance indicators. The mortality rate is 8% below the expected level and is among the best 30 nationally. The trust is just one of five in England where all inpatients are admitted within six months of referral and the proportion of outpatients seen by a consultant within 13 weeks of referral is among the 30 highest. The trust's facilities are also very clean: it is ranked in the top ten in England for the high standards of cleanliness in the A&E department and in outpatients' toilets.

In 2005, the hospital was awarded three-star status in the NHS's performance ratings.

Proposals to transfer the pathology department to a private provider were rejected in October 2014 after 11,000 people signed a petition protesting against the plan.

== Services ==
The trust's clinical services are organised into four directorates and provide the following services centralised on the Dorset County Hospital Site.

=== Emergency and medical services ===
- A & E
- Elderly Care
- General Medical Wards, Units and Specialities
- Neurology
- Dermatology
- Critical care (ITU, HDU, CCU)
- Renal (county-wide service)
- Clinical haematology
- Neurophysiology

=== Planned and surgical services ===
- Anaesthetics
- Day surgery
- Urology
- Ophthalmology
- ENT
- Outpatient (DCH & Weymouth)
- Theatres
- Trauma and orthopaedics
- Rheumatology
- General surgery

=== Family services ===
- Child health
- Gynaecology
- Maternity
- Oral, orthodontic & dental services
- Genitourinary medicine

The trust has a special care baby unit but this is not suitable for babies requiring intensive care. Babies born before 32 weeks have to be transferred to other hospitals in the Thames Valley and Wessex Neonatal Network.

=== Diagnostic services ===
- Pathology and haematology
- Medical physics
- Diagnostic imaging including spiral CT, MRI and nuclear medicine

The hospital is also recognised as a cancer unit for the provision of services for patients with gynaecological, breast, colorectal, urological, upper gastrointestinal, lung and haematological malignancies. While most chemotherapy is given locally, the radiotherapy centre is in the Cancer Centre at Poole Hospital.

== See also ==
- Healthcare in Dorset
- List of hospitals in England
- List of NHS trusts
