= Doris Odlum =

English psychiatrist (1890–1985)

- Odlum in 1939
- Born: Doris Maude Odlum; 26 June 1890; Folkestone, Kent, England
- Died: 14 October 1985 (aged 95); Bournemouth, Dorset, England
- Education: Talbot Heath School; St Hilda's College, Oxford; University of London; London School of Medicine for Women; St Mary's Hospital Medical School
- Occupation: Psychiatrist
- Years active: 1924–1955
- Employers: Royal Victoria Hospital; Elizabeth Garrett Anderson Hospital
- Partner: Zoe Jarret

Doris Maude Odlum (26 June 1890 – 14 October 1985) was an English psychiatrist. She helped to establish psychiatric departments at the Royal Victoria Hospital in Bournemouth and the Elizabeth Garrett Anderson Hospital. She served on the psychological medicine group of the British Medical Association for 45 years.

== Early life and education ==
Doris Odlum was born on 26 June 1890 in Folkestone, Kent, to Walter Edward Odlum and Maude Gough, both hoteliers. She attended Talbot Heath School in Bournemouth and read classics at St Hilda's College, Oxford. After graduating in 1912, she lectured for the Workers' Educational Association and campaigned for women's suffrage and pacifism. She moved to London in 1914 and received a BA from London University in 1914 and a diploma in education in 1915. She enrolled at the London School of Medicine for Women in 1915, but her studies were interrupted by the First World War; she joined the Women's Volunteer Reserve Corps and commanded a forage guard in the New Forest from 1917 to 1919. She continued her education in 1920 at St Mary's Hospital Medical School, which had begun to admit women.

== Medical career ==
Odlum graduated as LRCP and MRCS in 1924, and soon after moved to Brighton to work alongside Helen Boyle at Lady Chichester Hospital, a psychiatric hospital for women. She was appointed an honorary consultant in 1926; she also worked at Camberwell House and Maudsley Hospital, both psychiatric institutes in London. After receiving a diploma in psychological medicine in 1927, she helped to establish a psychiatric department and a child guidance clinic at the Royal Victoria Hospital in Bournemouth in 1928. When she applied for a consultant position at the Royal Victoria Hospital, she was denied on the basis that a woman had never been hired as a consultant before. She moved to the West End Hospital for Nervous Diseases in London in 1937 as an honorary consultant, and she co-founded a psychiatric department for women at the Elizabeth Garrett Anderson Hospital. Her main interest was in children's and adolescent psychiatry. She helped to produce a report on child neglect and cruelty with the Magistrates' Association in 1956, and her many publications included Journey through Adolescence (1957), The Mind of your Child (1960), and Adolescence (1978).

After joining the psychological medicine group of the British Medical Association as a founding member in 1937, Odlum served in the group for 45 years and chaired it between 1943 and 1946. She was elected vice president of the Medical Women's International Association in 1929 and 1950–54; vice president of the National Medical Women's Association in 1946–50; president of the Medical Women's Federation in 1950–52; and president of the European League for Mental Hygiene in 1953–56. She was a member of the Eugenics Education Society from 1931 to 1957. Odlum was made a fellow of the BMA in 1958, a foundation fellow of the Royal College of Psychiatrists in 1971, and an honorary fellow of St Hilda's College in 1980. Odlum was a Soroptimist and a member of SI Bournemouth. Odlum was interested in tennis, swimming, rowing, and golf. In 1916, she stroked the first women's eight race ever rowed. In 1919 she was reserve in the British National Fencing Championships.

== Later life ==
Odlum retired 1955. She spent the last 37 years of her life with her partner, Zoe Jarret, an artist. She died of a heart attack at the age of 95 on 14 October 1985 in Bournemouth.
