= Royal Victoria Hospital, Bournemouth =

Royal Victoria Hospital
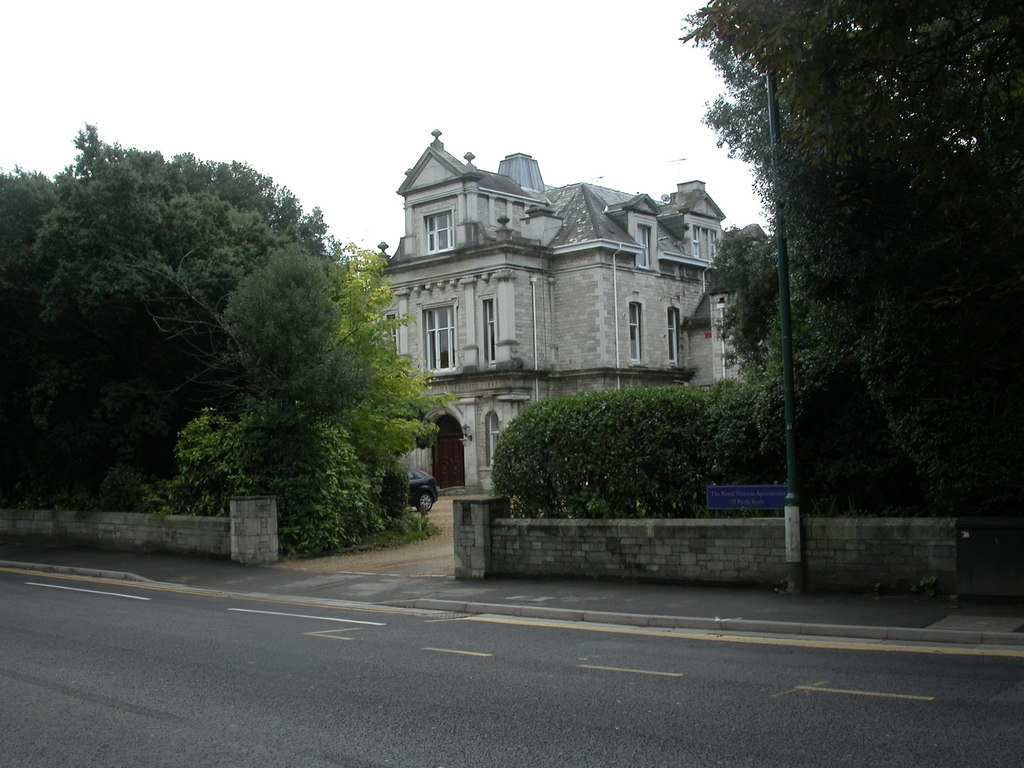
- Royal Victoria Hospital site, Poole Road, Westbourne

- Shown in Dorset

Geography
- Location: Bournemouth, Dorset, England
- Coordinates: 50.7207°N 1.8939°W

Organisation
- Care system: NHS

History
- Founded: 1876
- Closed: 2002

Links
- Lists: Hospitals in England

The Royal Victoria Hospital was a hospital situated on two sites in Bournemouth, England. The primary site was in Boscombe but for a period of time it was merged with a Westbourne site. The Westbourne site was the first named Royal Victoria Hospital of the two but the name was applied to both sites after merger in 1911. It has had several name changes during its history.

== History ==
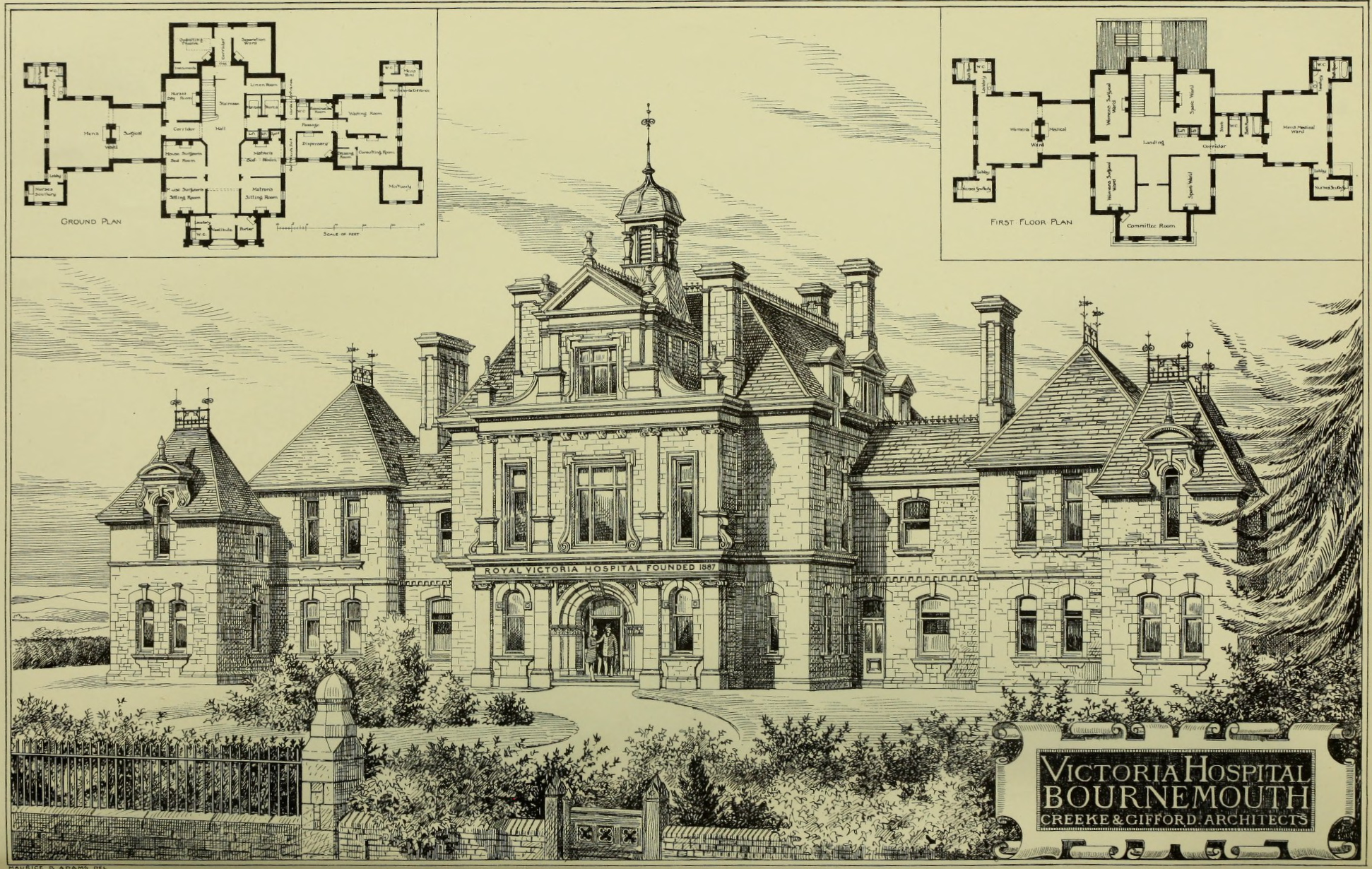
Royal Victoria Hospital c.1890

Early in May 1876 a dispensary scheme was launched in Bournemouth. This assisted those on low incomes to obtain treatment and medicines by means of a weekly subscription. In 1872 a formal decision was made to establish a 'branch hospital' for that purpose. In January 1877 it was announced that the premises were to be the permanent home of the dispensary, and were opened as the Boscombe, Pokesdown, and Springbourne Infirmary, with accommodation for twelve patients. This infirmary was the nucleus of Boscombe Hospital.

In February 1877, the Boscombe Cottage Hospital and Provident Dispensary opened in Shelley Road Boscombe. It initially had beds for 12 patients. It was expanded dramatically over time. It was later variously identified as the Boscombe Hospital, Royal Boscombe Hospital or the Royal Boscombe Hospital and West Hants Hospital.

The first named Royal Victoria Hospital of the two was at 17 Poole Road, Westbourne. The hospital was raised through public subscription and founded in 1887. The building was designed by Messrs Creeke & Gifford, in the Queen Anne style, and erected by Messrs George & Harding, growing from 38 to 50 beds. It was officially opened by the Prince of Wales, on 16 January 1890.

In 1911, the two hospitals merged as the Royal Victoria and West Hants Hospital. The two sites were also simply identified as the Royal Victoria Hospital.

Comedian and actor Tony Hancock's father died of cancer at the Royal Victoria Hospital (Boscombe site) in 1935.

After the Second World War, the Royal Victoria Hospital (Westbourne site) became an Ear, Nose & Throat (ENT) Hospital. It was then renamed Westbourne Eye Hospital. The site was sold and the buildings converted into apartments around 2002.

After services transferred to the Royal Bournemouth Hospital in 1989, most of the buildings forming the Royal Victoria Hospital (Boscombe site) were demolished in 1993. Some parts of the hospital are still in use as NHS Clinical Commissioning Group administrative offices and an ENT clinic.

Sixteen of the original W. B. Simpson tile panels from the children's ward at the Boscombe site can be found mounted on the stairs of the Royal Bournemouth Hospital. The panels, which date from 1911, show nursery rhymes and agricultural scenes.

== See also ==
- Healthcare in Dorset
- List of hospitals in England
