= University Hospitals Dorset NHS Foundation Trust =

NHS hospital trust

- Type: NHS foundation trust
- Established: 1 October 2020
- Region served: East Dorset
- Hospitals: Christchurch Hospital; Poole Hospital; Royal Bournemouth Hospital
- Chair: David Moss
- Chief executive: Siobhan Harrington
- Staff: 9,855
- Website: www.uhd.nhs.uk

University Hospitals Dorset NHS Foundation Trust manages three hospitals in South East Dorset. It was formed following the merger of Poole Hospital NHS Foundation Trust and The Royal Bournemouth and Christchurch Hospitals NHS Foundation Trust.

== History ==
Attempts to merge Poole Hospital NHS Foundation Trust and The Royal Bournemouth and Christchurch Hospitals NHS Foundation Trust started back in 2011 but was blocked in October 2013 by the Competition Commission, in its first intervention into the NHS.

As part of the sustainability and transformation plan for Dorset it was proposed that between Poole Hospital and Royal Bournemouth Hospital one would become a Major Planned Care Hospital with Urgent Care Centre and the other a Major Emergency Hospital with A&E services, reaffirming commitment to implementing the outcome of Dorset's Clinical Services Review. The proposals were challenged in judicial review.

University Hospitals Dorset NHS Foundation Trust was originally due to be founded on 1 July 2020 but this was delayed due to the COVID-19 pandemic. The trust was finally founded on 1 October 2020, after nine years of planning, legal challenges and delays.

=== Name ===
In December 2019 it was announced that the new combine trust was going to be called East Dorset Hospitals NHS Foundation Trust. This name was chosen from suggestions submitted by staff, governors and patients of the hospitals involved. However just 4 months later the trust was given university hospital status, resulting in a name change to University Hospitals Dorset NHS Foundation Trust. This was part of a plan with partners at Bournemouth University to "confirm the extremely close working relationship the hospitals and the university has enjoyed over many years".

=== Predecessor trusts ===
Poole Hospital NHS Foundation Trust gained foundation status in 2007 and ran Poole Hospital in the south of England until the merger on 1 October 2020.

Royal Bournemouth and Christchurch Hospitals NHS Foundation Trust gained foundation status in 2005 and ran Christchurch Hospital and the Royal Bournemouth Hospital in the south of England until the merger on 1 October 2020. In October 2013, as a result of the Keogh Review, the Trust was put into the highest risk category by the Care Quality Commission. In November 2014 the Trust faced difficulties with discharging patients. 70 patients at the Royal Bournemouth Hospital were fit to leave but were still on wards. The Trust said it was considering the possibility of legal action to evict patients.

== Services ==
The trust serves a population of more than 800,000 people, reaching as far as Purbeck, the New Forest and South Wiltshire, and collectively employs more than 9,000 members of staff. In additional general hospital services, the trust provides a range of specialist services and facilities including:

- The Dorset Cancer Centre which offers medical and clinical oncology services for the whole of Dorset
- The major trauma unit for east Dorset, serving a population of more than 500,000 people
- A state-of-the-art Cardiology Unit (the Dorset Heart Centre), and award-winning orthopaedic service providing hip and knee replacements

It set up a single electronic patient record using Graphnet software running live across the two acute sites before the merger was complete. This involved migrating 34 million items of clinical data and about 40 interfaces from the legacy systems. It feeds into the Dorset Care Record.

The trust set up a new ‘health village’ in Dolphin Shopping Centre, an outpatient assessment clinic, located on the second floor of the Beales department store, in 2022, using material and equipment from decommissioned Nightingale hospitals. This 20,000 sq ft clinic will cover ophthalmology, dermatology, breast screening, and musco-skeletal services.

== Hospitals within group ==
- Christchurch Hospital, Dorset
- Poole Hospital
- Royal Bournemouth Hospital

== See also ==
- Healthcare in Dorset
- List of NHS trusts
