= Velvet (bus company) =

English bus company

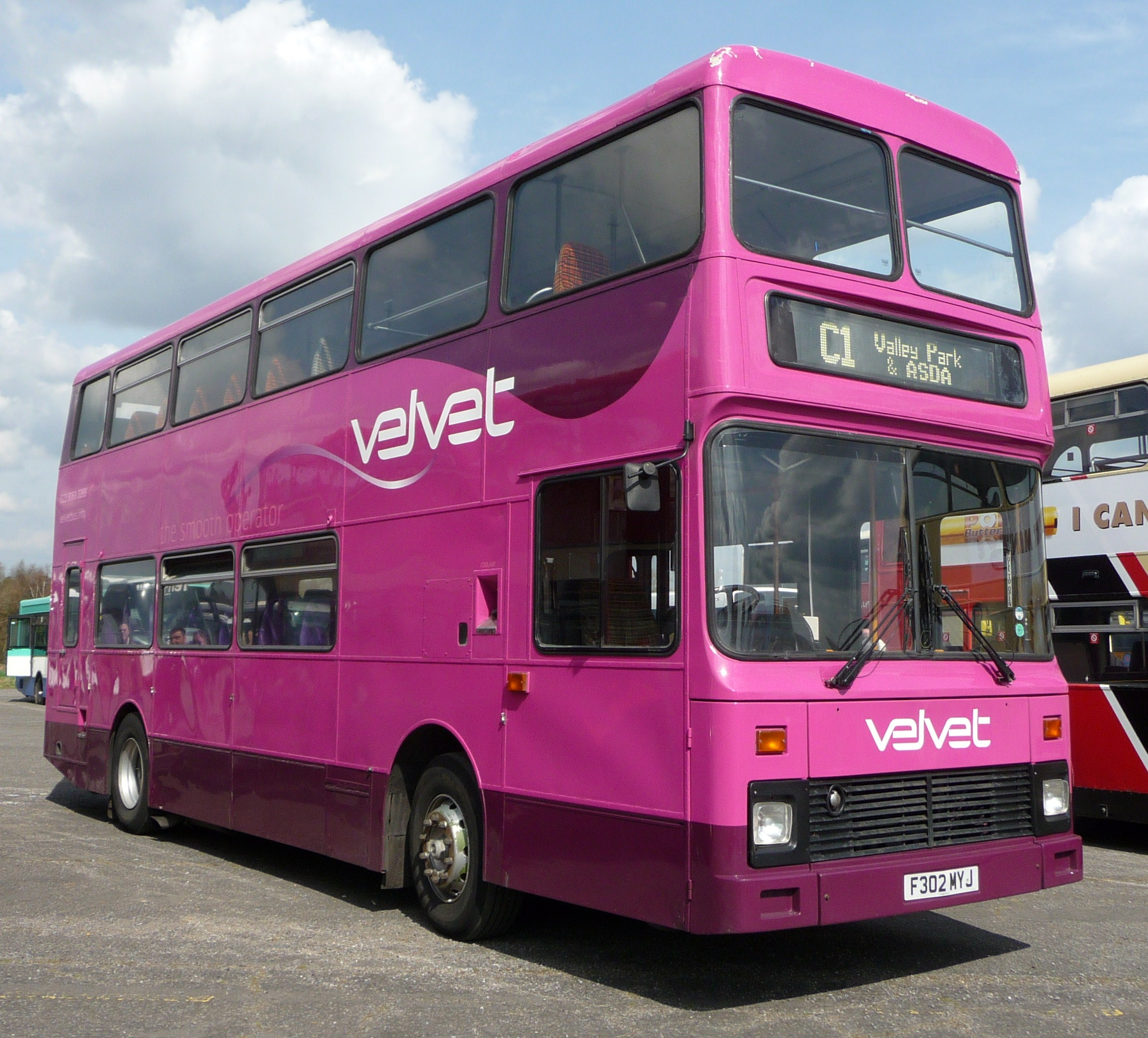
- Northern Counties Palatine bodied Volvo B10M in April 2009
- Parent: Western Greyhound
- Founded: 3 November 2007
- Defunct: 10 January 2015
- Headquarters: Eastleigh
- Service area: Hampshire
- Service type: Bus services
- Chief executive: Paul Jones
- Website: www.velvetbus.co.uk

Black Velvet Travel Limited, trading as Velvet, was an English bus company based in Eastleigh, that operated between November 2007 and January 2015.

== History ==
Velvet was established on 3 November 2007 by former Go South Coast director Phil Stockley, and in January 2008 began running a temporary shuttle for Tesco staff.

On 25 February 2008, Velvet took over the running of Red Rocket A in Eastleigh, which was given up by previous operator Solent Blue Line as part of their network restructuring. Velvet gained a number of contracts to run other routes, as well as many new commercial ventures.

Since the start of 2014, Velvet had been withdrawing or reducing services following what is described as 'a very difficult winter'. On 12 May 2014, Velvet surrendered the contract with Hampshire County Council to operate route 67 Winchester-West Meon-Petersfield, which moved on to Xelabus and Stagecoach South operation. All Barton Peveril College routes were transferred to Xelabus on 22 June 2014, along with the Eastleigh-Hedge End section of Velvet's A service. This followed the collapse of a deal in March 2014 which would have seen Xelabus take over the company.

On 16 July 2014, the company announced it had ceased trading, with other operators stepping in to cover its services. However two days later operations resumed, with the company announcing on Twitter that it had new owners. Founder and former managing director Phil Stockley commented that the company had not entered any formal insolvency process, and that he would no longer be involved in running Velvet. After operating the service for two weeks on an interim basis, Adam Smith purchased the business. Smith was convicted of possessing counterfeit money a month later, but avoided a prison sentence as jobs at Velvet depended upon him. Velvet's director Michael Bishop took over Cornish independent Western Greyhound in December 2014, with Smith becoming its managing director. On 10 January 2015, Velvet ceased operating, with the three remaining routes passing to Xelabus.

== Services ==
As of July 2014, Velvet operated six routes under contract to Eastleigh Borough Council. By November 2014 this had reduced to four.
