= Seaview Services =

Bus operator on the Isle of Wight, England

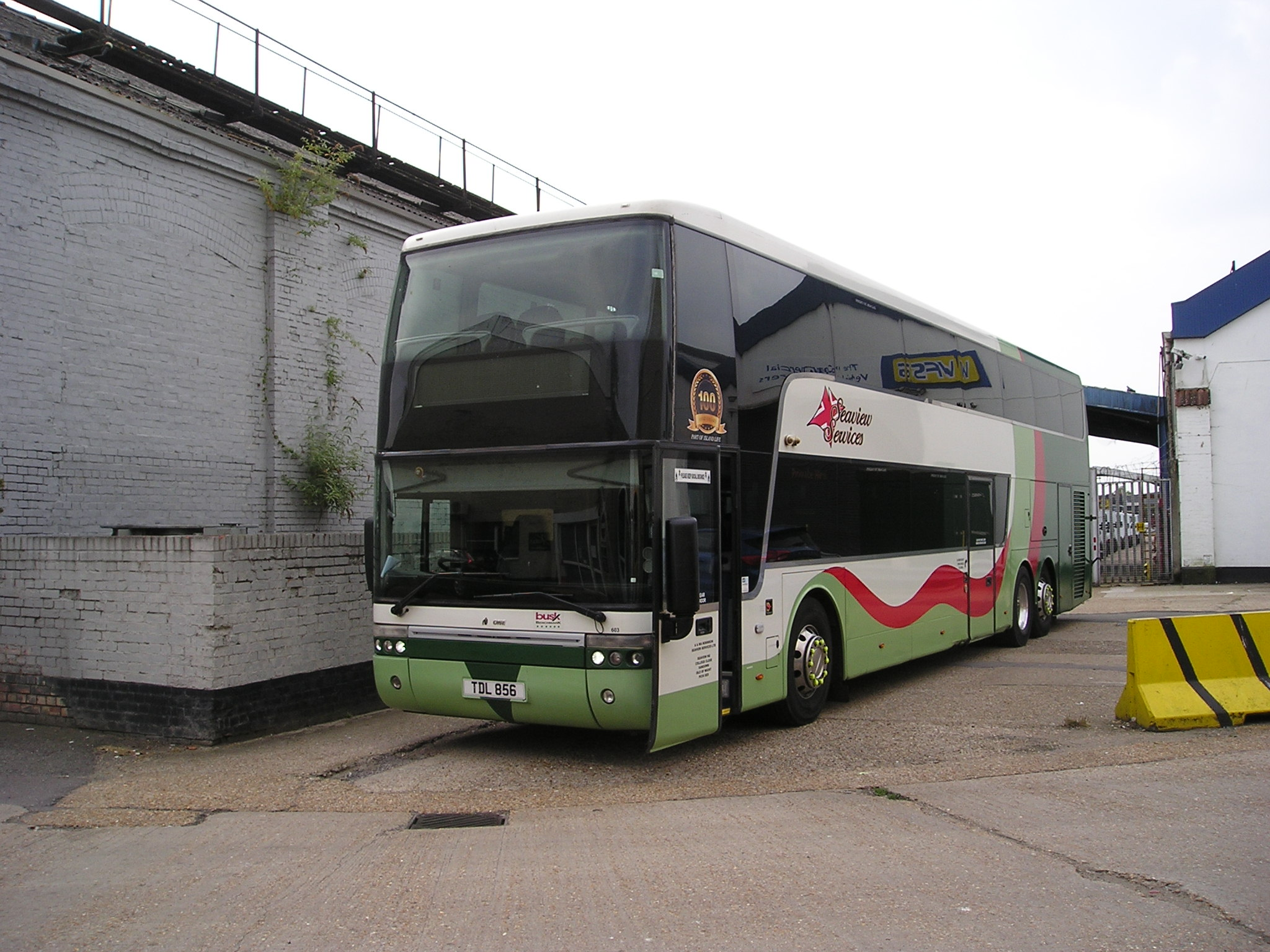
- Van Hool Astromega in Eastleigh in June 2022
- Parent: Wight Coaches
- Founded: 1922
- Headquarters: Sandown
- Service area: Isle of Wight
- Service type: Coach operator
- Website: www.seaview-services.co.uk

Seaview Services was a coach hire and tour operator operating on the Isle of Wight. It was up til recent a subsidiary of Xelabus but now the trading name is owned by Wight Coaches of Newport Isle of Wight.

== History ==
=== Early 20th Century ===
In 1922 Richard Newell commenced operating a bus service between Seaview and Ryde. By the end of the 1920s Newell had commenced operating charter services.

The development of holiday camps at Puckpool and St Clare in the late 1930s boosted business considerably on the bus route as well as providing additional excursion work. The extra revenue created from this was used to fund the purchase of new coaches. In July 1939 Newells (Seaview) Limited was registered, being renamed Seaview Services Limited in July 1942. After the end of World War II trade increased rapidly particularly in connection with the holiday camps. In 1950, the company purchased two new Leyland Titan double deck buses to cope with the increased passenger numbers.

=== Late 20th Century ===
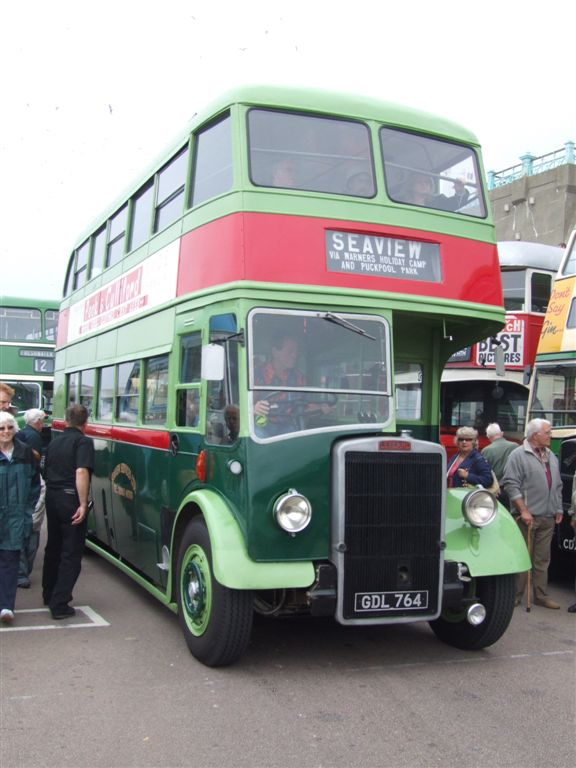
Leyland Titan PD2 in Brighton

In 1980 Seaview Services was sold to Mary Robinson and in December 1981 the company name was renamed A & MA Robinson Seaview Services Limited. The company continued to run route 12 from Seaview to Ryde under RedLynx branding, and in May 1986, (several months before deregulation day) extended this route to Nettlestone, St Helens, Bembridge and Sandown. However this move encouraged Southern Vectis to compete against Seaview Services with a minibus service to Seaview, leading to a bus war between the two firms. After this period of initial competition, in May 1987 Seaview Services retreated back to its previous Seaview to Ryde route and Southern Vectis withdrew its competing service.In 1989 the Seaview garage was sold and a new garage opened in Sandown. In 1992 the bus side of the business was sold to Southern Vectis and the company has since concentrated solely on coach charters and tours.

=== Purchase by Xelabus ===
In May 2022, the company was acquired by Xelabus of Eastleigh. Since the purchase, Seaview Services is undergoing a refresh with new logo and livery while retaining its name.
