= Walter Andrew =

English cricketer

Personal information
- Full name: Walter Andrew
- Born: 22 March 1869; Bournemouth, Hampshire, England
- Died: 30 March 1911 (aged 42); Sligo, Ireland
- Batting: Right handed
- Bowling: Right-arm medium

Domestic team information
- Years: Team
- 1897–1898: Hampshire
- 1902–1906: Dorset

Career statistics
Competition	First-class
Matches	12
Runs scored	312
Batting average	14.85
100s/50s	1/1
Top score	106
Balls bowled	1,297
Wickets	23
Bowling average	27.21
5 wickets in innings	1
10 wickets in match	0
Best bowling	5/157
Catches/stumpings	3/–
- Source: Cricinfo, 16 May 2022

Walter Andrew (22 March 1869 – 30 March 1911) was an English first-class cricketer, architect and surveyor.

A native of Bournemouth, Andrew made his debut in first-class cricket for Hampshire against the touring Gentlemen of Philadelphia during the Bournemouth Cricket Week of 1897. At the end of July of the same year, he made his debut in the County Championship and subsequently recorded what would be his only first-class century, making 106 against Warwickshire at Southampton, sharing in a partnership of 222 runs for the fourth wicket with Ledger Hill. Having played five first-class matches for Hampshire in 1897, Andrew found himself second in the Hampshire batting averages in the County Championship, behind Francis Lacey and Herbert Ward; his return being 247 runs at an average of 35.28. His return with the ball was 11 wickets at a bowling average of 34.00 across the season, with one five wicket haul of 5 for 157 on his Championship debut against Sussex.

Andrew made seven first-class appearances in 1898, but was unable to repeat his reasonable form with the bat from the previous season, scoring just 40 runs across 12 innings'. However, he remained consistent as a medium pace bowler, taking 12 wickets across the season at an average of 21.00. He was not re-engaged by Hampshire in 1899. His final record as a batsman was 312 runs in twelve first-class matches, at an average of 14.85. While his first-class career ended in 1898, Andrew later played representative cricket at minor counties level for Dorset between 1902 and 1908, making 20 appearances in the Minor Counties Championship. He also played club cricket for Poole Cricket Club. Andrew's other sporting interests were listed in 1897 as field hockey and lacrosse.

Outside of cricket, Andrew was by profession an architect and surveyor. Amongst his architectural designs was the new Cornelia Hospital in Poole, construction of which began in 1907. He also designed the clubhouse for the Parkstone Golf Club. He was active in civic life in Poole, serving as a town councillor and being elected the town sheriff in 1899. While visiting Sligo in Ireland, Andrew became seriously ill during his stay at the Imperial Hotel and subsequently died on 30 March 1911.
