= Xelabus =

British bus operating company

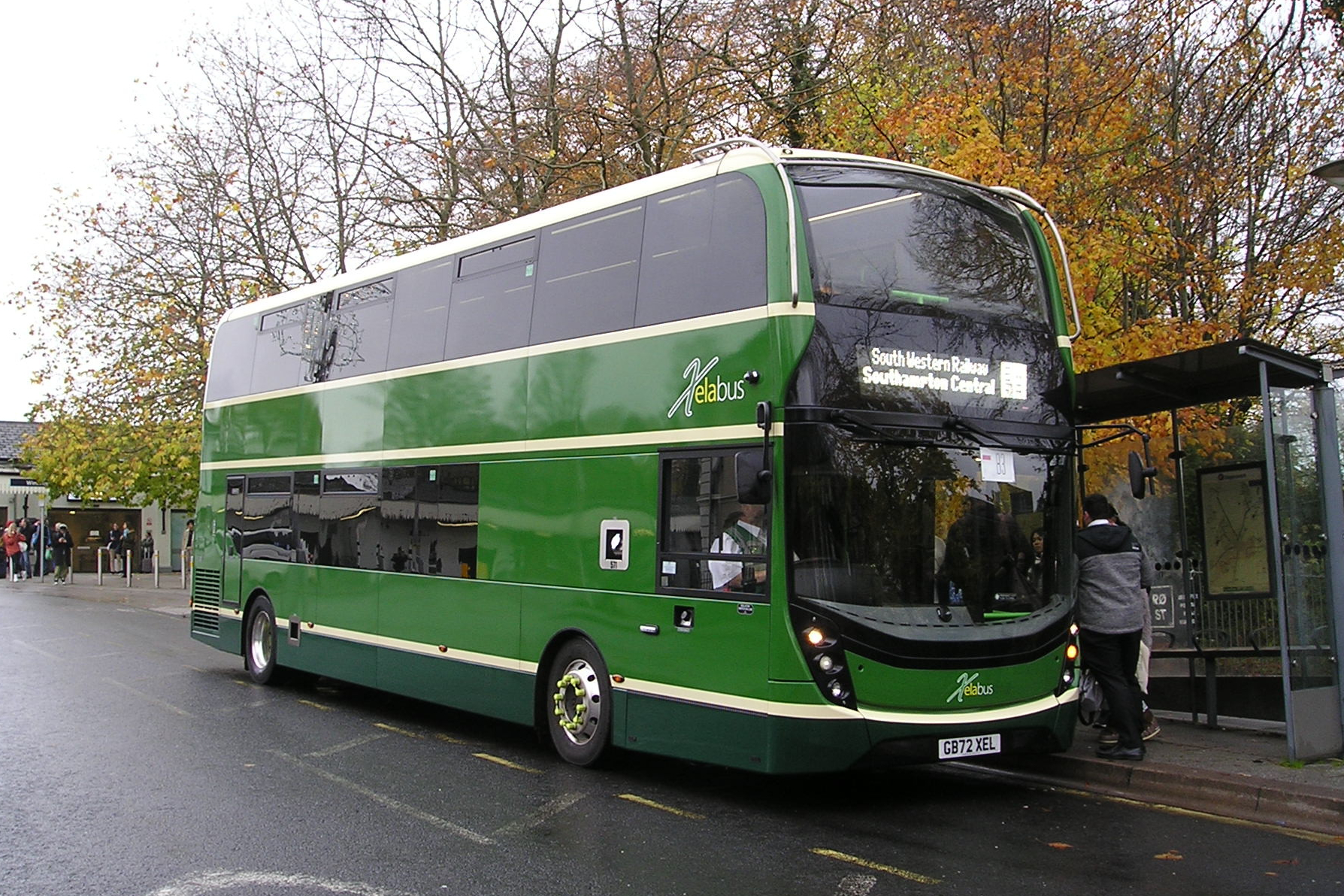
- ADL Enviro400 MMC in Winchester in December 2022
- Parent: Xelagroup Ltd
- Founded: November 2010; 15 years ago
- Headquarters: Eastleigh
- Service area: Hampshire
- Service type: Bus services Contract hire
- Fleet: 75 (November 2022)
- Website: www.xelabus.info

Xelabus Limited is an independent bus and coach operator, based in Eastleigh, Hampshire. It primarily operates public bus services within the Southampton area. All their operations come under their parent, Xelagroup Ltd.

== History ==
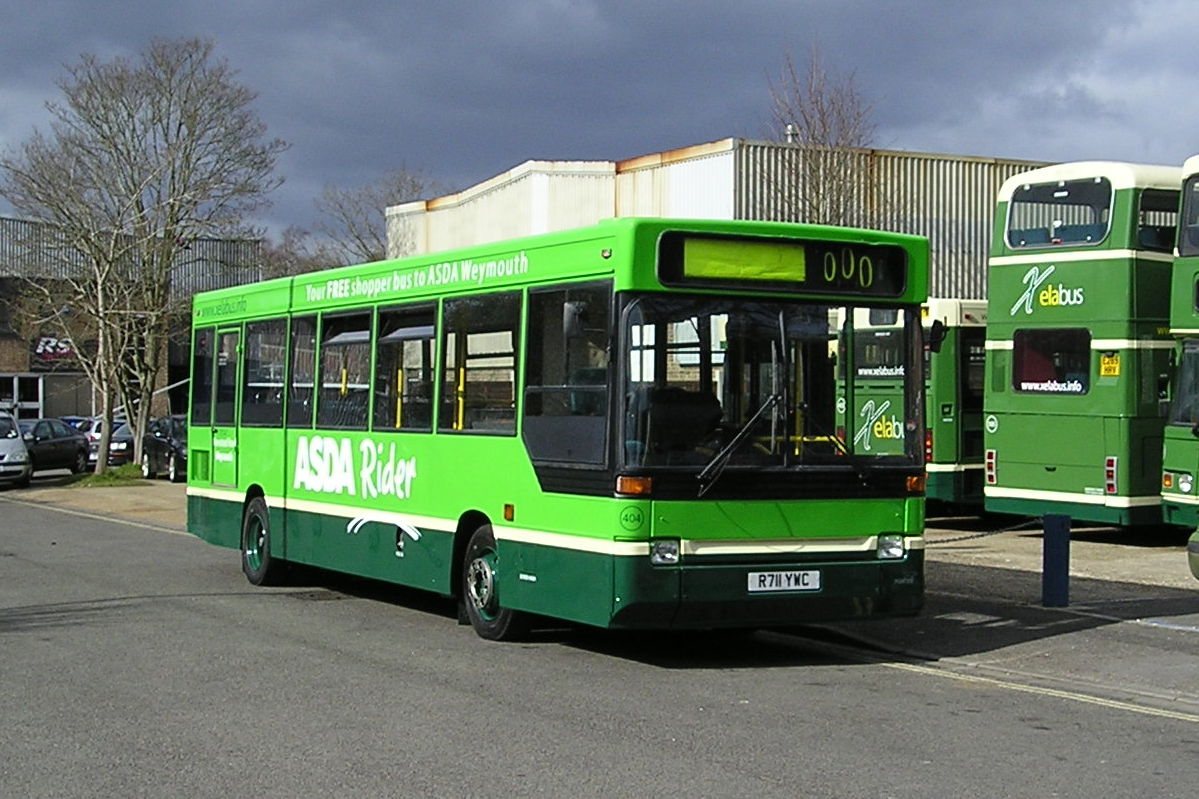
Plaxton Pointer I bodied Dennis Dart in March 2011

Xelabus was founded in November 2010 by Gareth Blair, after finishing a CPC course with the Chartered Institute of Logistics and Transport in Bristol. The name is a portmanteau of his son's name spelt backwards with the word bus. Vehicles are painted in a green livery similar to that of the former Hants & Dorset company that used to run in the region until 1983 when it was dissolved. A free service in Eastleigh to Chandlers Ford was the first route to be introduced which grew to seven bus routes that mainly served the local Asda and Tesco supermarkets in the region. Since then, nine more routes have commenced including an Open Top Bus "Sea the city" in Portsmouth in 2011. Some services have been more successful than others, with one service to Southampton competing with Bluestar being withdrawn in less than 12 months. In September 2012, Xelabus began a two-year contract to operate services to Totton College.

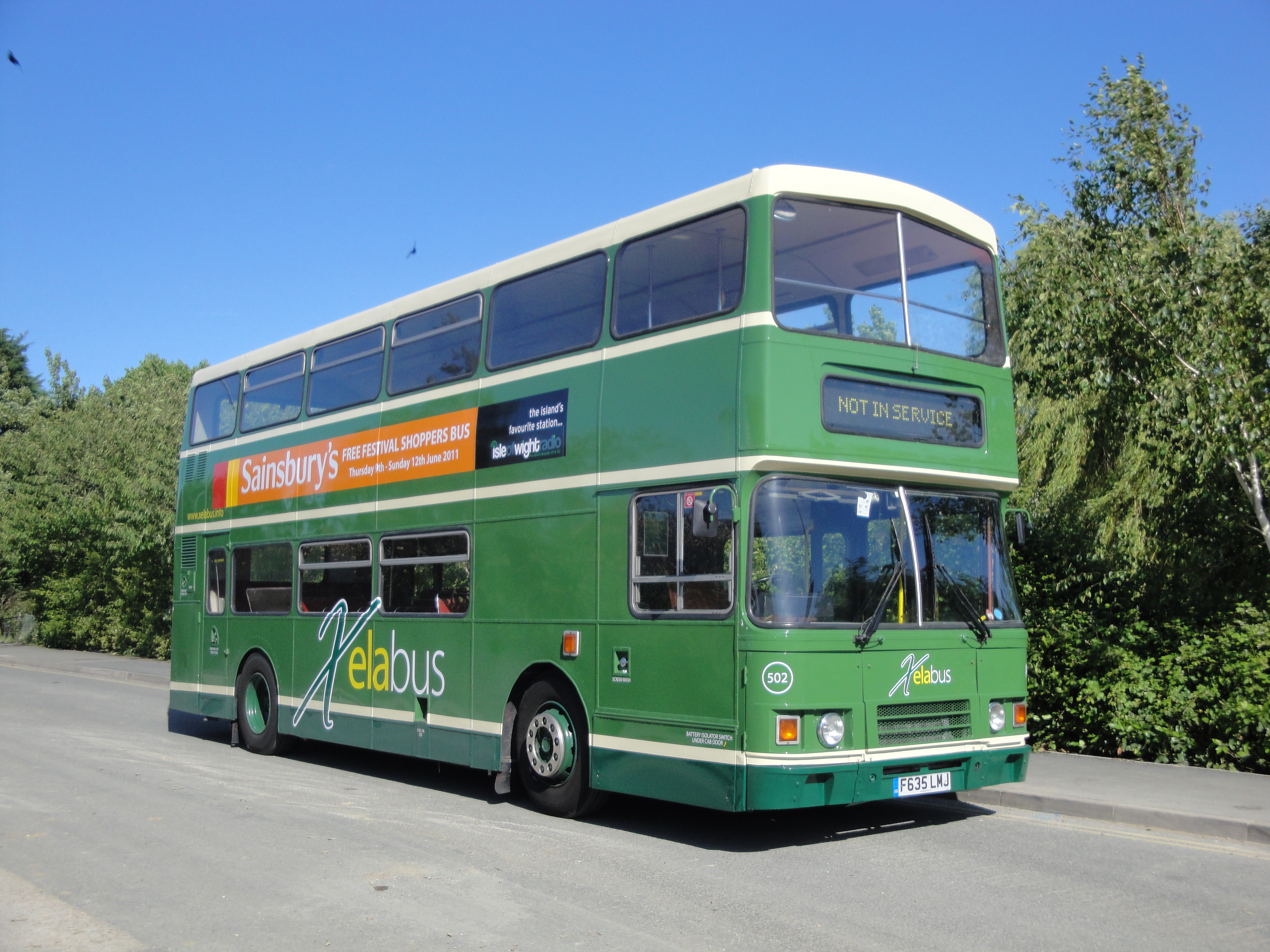
Alexander bodied Leyland Olympian in June 2011

On 12 May 2014, Xelabus took over route 67 Winchester to Petersfield via West Meon from Velvet under contract to Hampshire County Council. In June the same year, it took over the Barton Peveril College routes from Velvet. Between January and August 2015, Xelabus acquired the routes and school services of Velvet and Brijan Tours when both of them went into administration.

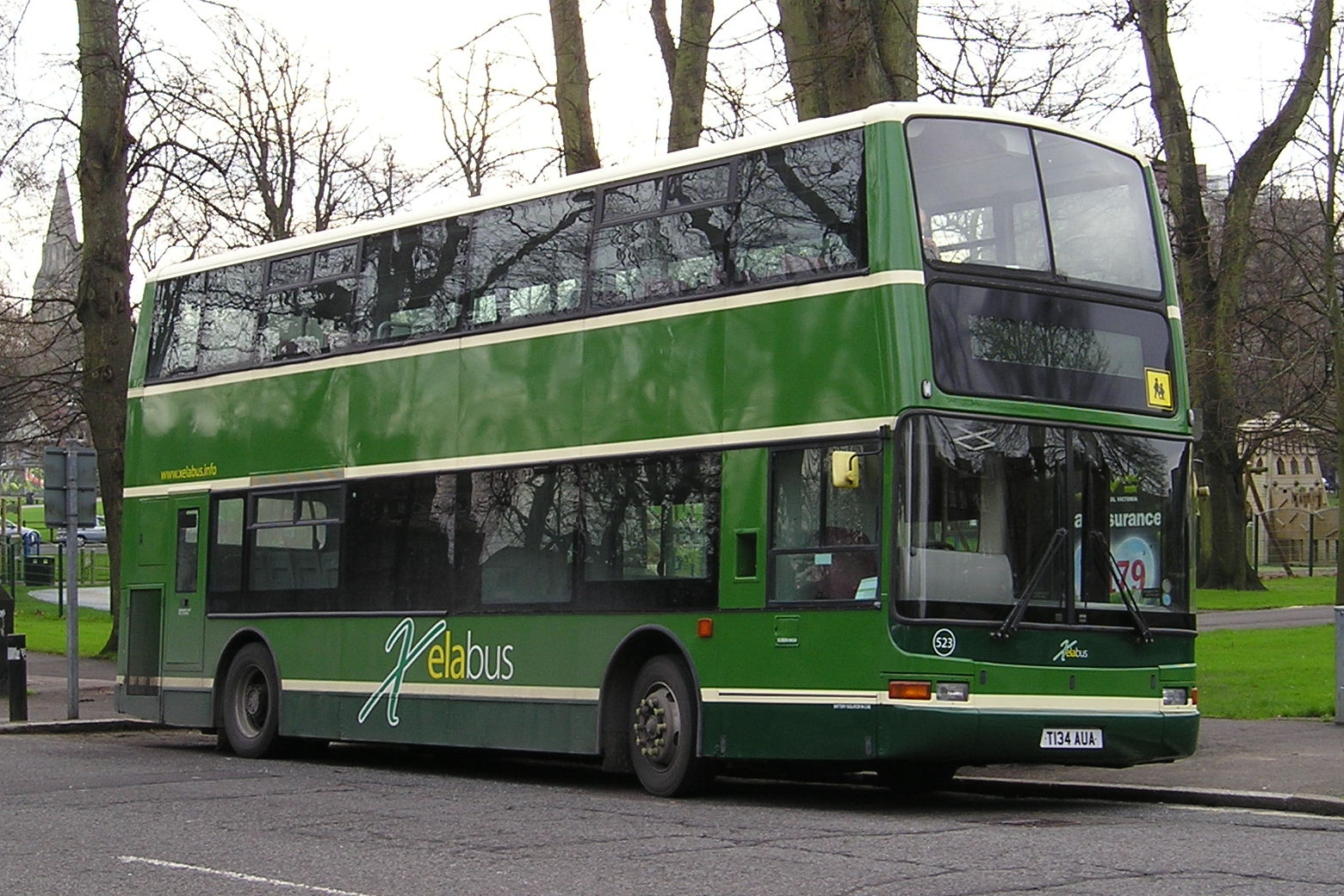
Plaxton President bodied DAF DB250 in June 2016

On 4 November 2019, Xelabus introduced contactless payments across their vehicles. For a short time during the 2020 Coronavirus outbreak, all Xelabus service were suspended in March for three months until June where over time it started to return to a normal frequency. A month later, the company was awarded the contract to run the X21 to the Chilworth Science Park by the University of Southampton. The route is the only one contracted by the university to not use the uni-link branding and it runs between Southampton and Chilworth via Southampton Airport parkway, using an ADL Enviro200 MMC equipped with WiFi facilities and leather seating.

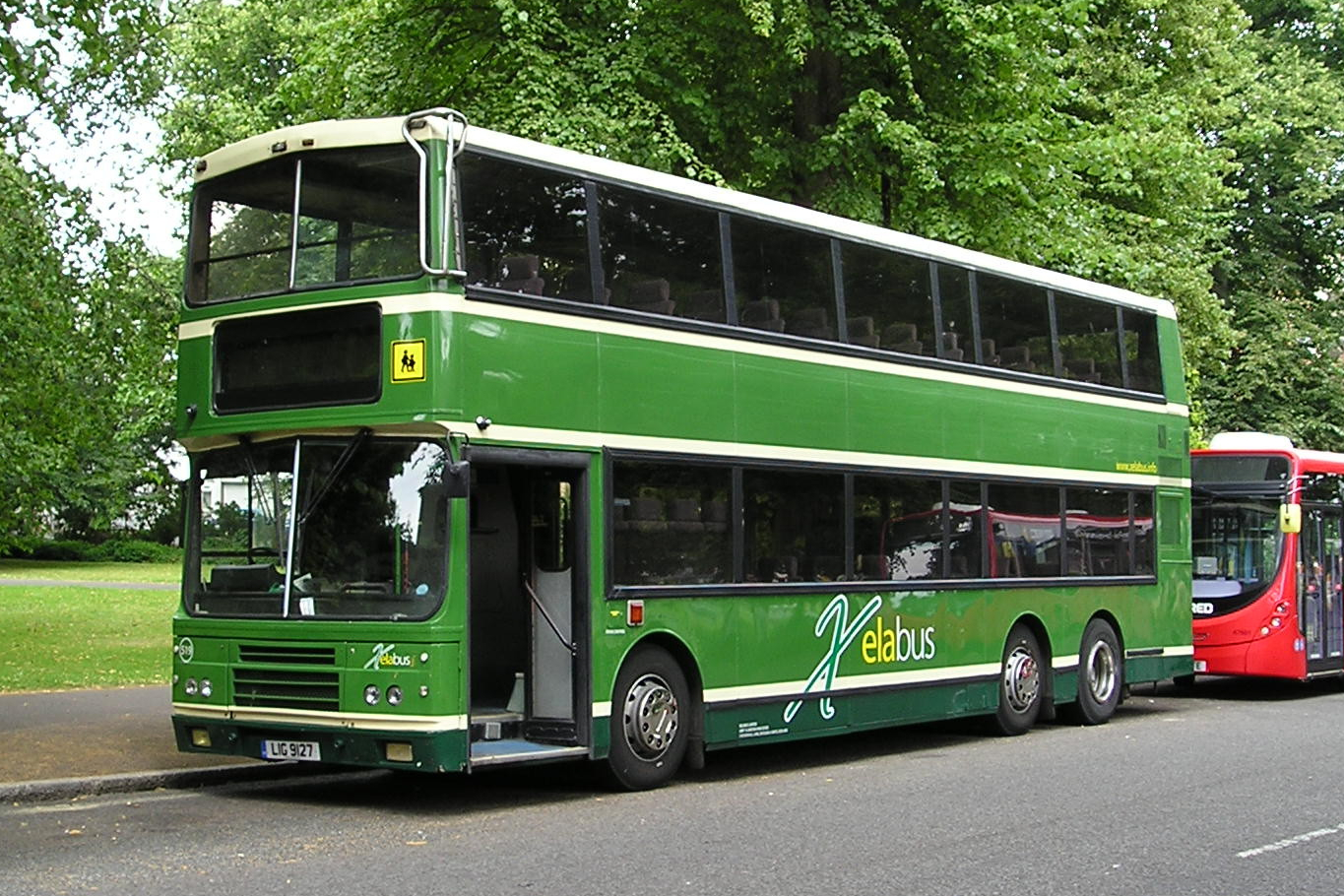
Alexander RH bodied Leyland Olympian in August 2016

Xelabus saw two purchases of local coach companies within 2022, Seaview Services of Sandown in May, and Yellow Coaches of Bournemouth in August. These were purchased under the Xelagroup parent company. The latter of the two was awarded an emergency tender by the BCP council after its purchase to cover for routes 18, 33 and 36; this emergency tender ended on 14 February 2023 with Yellow Coaches subsequently withdrawing public operations in Bournemouth. These routes previously were contracted to Yellow Buses, and were covered by Morebus for two weeks as the former fell into administration.

In August 2022, five public services within Hampshire were cut from the network due to rising costs and low patronage. One of these routes was covered by another operator, Southampton Mini Link, for two months before it ceased operations.

In July 2023, 3 public services were cut from the network with the termination of the contracts to the routes. Routes X4 and X4A were taken over by Bluestar, with the X21 university route being taken over by Unilink. In October 2024, services X11 and X12 were cut from the network at the end of the services' contract period with the company's shift towards contracted work. These were taken by Bluestar and renumbered as 21 and 22.

In August 2024, the parent company moved its bus and coach operations to a new site in Eastleigh, out of the previous premises at Barton Park where it had been for 12 years. It then held an anniversary open-day at the site for 15 years of service in May 2025, hosting trade stalls and running vintage bus rides. The event ended up reaching over 500 visitors.

== Bus & coach operations ==
Xelabus operates private services for local schools and colleges as well as public services between Bitterne to Midanbury, Sholing and Thornhill in Southampton, subsidised by the Southampton City Council.

Coach and on hire operations began in May 2022 under the brand name Xelacoach. Also within the same month, Seaview Services was purchased and incorporated into the company. This has grown the bus fleet by around eight and given them access to operations on the Isle of Wight. With the collapse of Yellow Buses in Bournemouth, the Yellow Coaches subsidiary was purchased by the company on 5 August 2022, joining their private hire and school shuttle operations. The company expanded its coach operations in June 2025 with the purchase of Freedom Travel of Poole, and has since moved its depot to Verwood and added two 85-seater double decker buses to its fleet.

== Fleet ==
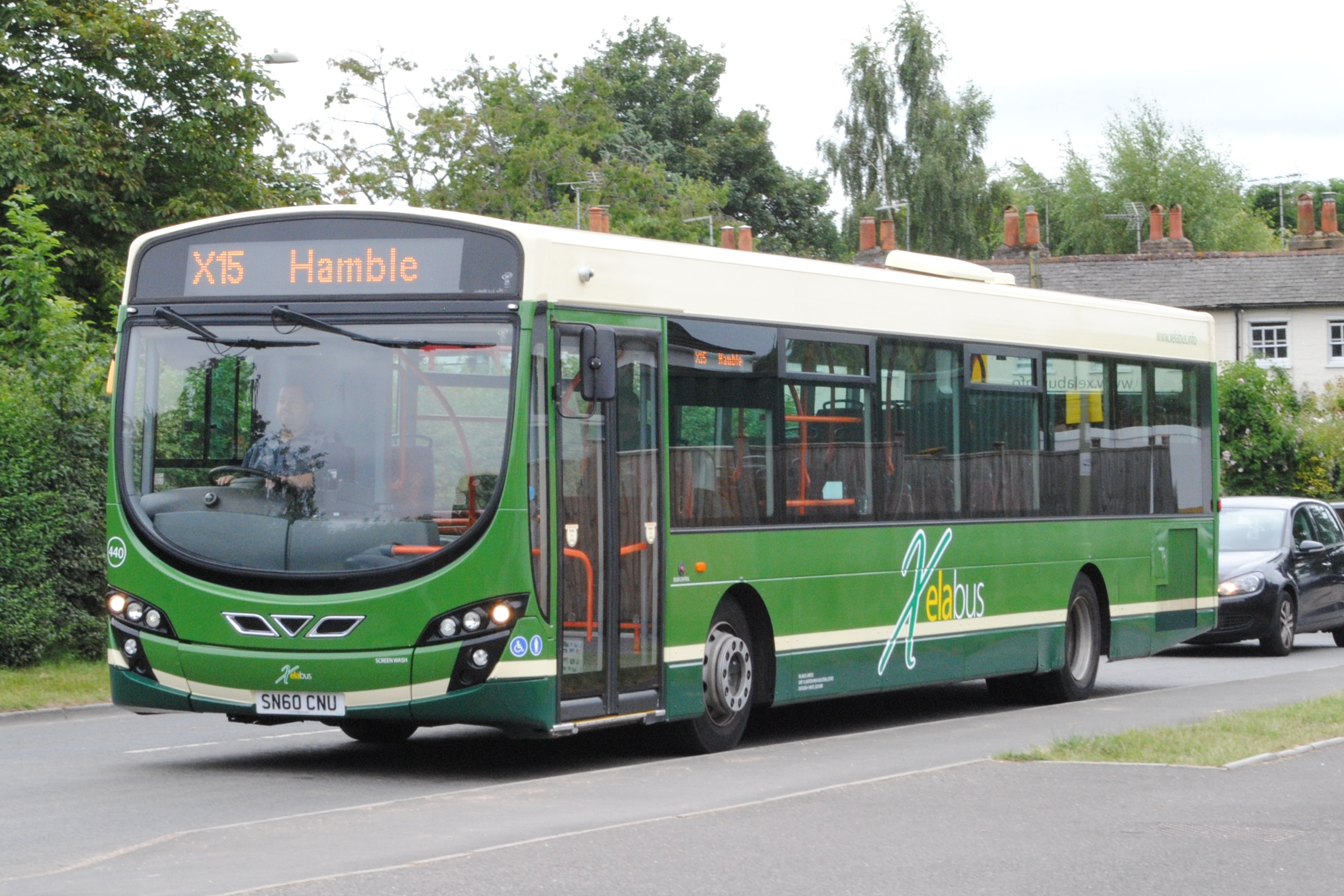
Wright Eclipse 2 bodied Volvo B7RLE in 2017

Xelabus initially operated a fleet of seven vehicles which had grown to around 40 vehicles in October 2019.

In 2017, Xelabus ordered several 8.9m ADL Enviro 200s from Mistral Bus and Coach sales, an investment of over £0.5 million. A year later, they took delivery of three Wright Gemini Volvo B5LHs for the Itchen College contracted routes in April 2018.

In 2022, another order was placed for two second hand Mercedes-Benz Tourismos for the coach operations of the company. Also that year, Xelabus took delivery of a pair of Alexander Dennis Enviro400 MMC double-deck buses.

In 2024, the parent group expanded their coach operations with the order of two AOS Grand Toro coaches.

== Depot fire ==
A fire broke out in the depot during the evening of 13 March 2011. Several vehicles were damaged with three being destroyed in the fire. Firefighters arrived at the scene and were able to prevent the fire from spreading to a nearby two-storey building. Hampshire police investigators believed it may have been a deliberate attack.
