= Dorset HealthCare University NHS Foundation Trust =

NHS Foundation Trust

- Type: NHS foundation trust
- Established: 1 April 2007
- Region served: Dorset
- Population: 800,000
- Hospitals: 12
- Chair: David Clayton-Smith
- Chief executive: Matthew Bryant
- Staff: 7,000+
- Website: www.dorsethealthcare.nhs.uk

Dorset HealthCare University NHS Foundation Trust provides community and mental health services across Dorset.

== History ==
The Dorset Health Care NHS Trust was established in November 1991, taking over responsibility from East Dorset Health Authority. In April 2007, the Trust achieved foundation trust status. The Trust then became university-affiliated in June 2010, after approval by Monitor to use 'University' in its title. The Trust collaborates with Bournemouth University and Southampton University.

== Services ==
The Trust runs 12 community hospitals and minor injuries units, as well as providing:

- Adult and children's community and mental health
- Specialist learning disability services
- Community brain injury services
- Addiction support
- Eating disorder services
- Sexual health services

== Estate ==
The Trust has a large and geographically broad estate, operating from over 300 sites ranging from community hospitals to single rooms within premises of other NHS providers. It includes a wide range of different properties, from small to medium-sized mental health in-patient hospitals to single ward community hospitals located in market towns. The Trust participated in an Enhancing the Healing Environment project with the King's Fund to encourage greater use of dining, social and garden areas in St Brelades Ward, Alderney Hospital, Poole.

In November 2021, the Trust started building an inpatient eating disorders unit at St Ann's Hospital in Sandbanks with eight inpatient beds and two high-dependency beds.

== Regulation ==
The Trust is regulated by NHS England. The Trust is also registered with the Care Quality Commission.

Monitor found the trust to be in breach of its licence for taking too long to make legally binding changes agreed in April 2013 to properly address quality of care issues raised by the Care Quality Commission and for failing to ensure appropriate staffing levels. In July 2014 Monitor reported that its concerns had been addressed.

In January 2014 the Trust admitted that it has been failing standards on same sex accommodation for more than two years, despite reporting compliance.

In April 2015 it was reported that this was the only foundation trust in England where persistently more than 7.5 per cent of its beds are occupied by a patient whose transfer has been delayed, this being one of Monitor's targets. The trust said: "This [performance] is in a context of a very real shortage of nursing or residential placements, exacerbated by the closure of two independent care homes due to quality concerns that removed 71 beds from the local system."

In July 2019, the trust was rated Outstanding by the Care Quality Commission.

== Leadership ==
The director of nursing, Paul Lumsden, resigned in March 2014 after less than three months in the post. The chair and chief executive also resigned after intervention by Monitor (NHS) and were replaced on an interim basis by Sir David Henshaw and Ron Shields respectively. Former parliamentary health service ombudsman Ann Abraham was appointed as permanent chair from 7 April. Eugine Yafele, a former mental health nurse, was appointed chief executive in December 2018. In 2022 he moved to University Hospitals Bristol and Weston NHS Foundation Trust as chief executive. He was the top of the Health Service Journal ranking of NHS chief executives.

The Trust spent nearly £650,000 on an external PR and marketing firm, Southampton-based Grayling PR from 2008 to 2014. In 2014/15 the trust will spend more than £104,000 on services provided by the firm. Its total PR and marketing budget for the current year is £177,000, but that does not take into account the salaries of its own communications staff. Nicola Plumb, director for organisational development, participation and corporate affairs at the trust, is in charge of communications and is paid nearly £100,000 a year.

== See also ==
- Healthcare in Dorset
- List of NHS trusts
