= Poole Hospital =

- University Hospitals Dorset NHS Foundation Trust
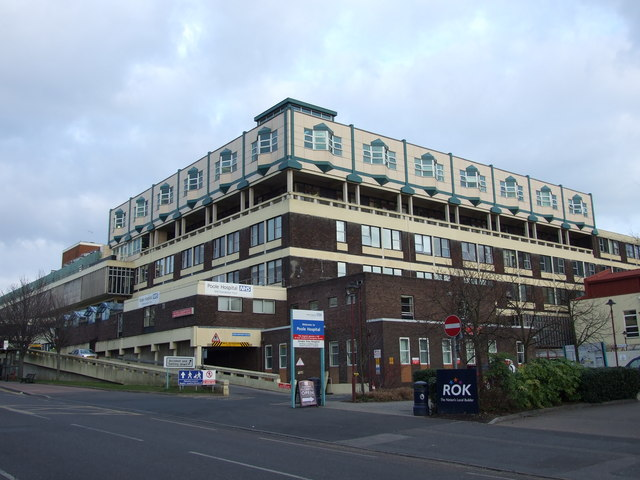

- Shown in Dorset

Geography
- Location: Poole, Dorset, United Kingdom
- Coordinates: 50°43′17.4″N 1°58′24.6″W

Organisation
- Care system: Public NHS
- Type: General

Services
- Emergency department: Yes Accident & Emergency
- Beds: 789

History
- Founded: 1907

Links
- Website: www.uhd.nhs.uk/hospitals-poole
- Lists: Hospitals in the United Kingdom

Poole Hospital (also known as Poole General Hospital) is an acute general hospital in Poole, Dorset, England. Built in 1907, it has expanded from a basic 14-bed facility into a 789-bed hospital. It is the trauma centre for east Dorset and provides specialist services such as cancer treatment for the entire county. It is managed by the University Hospitals Dorset NHS Foundation Trust. The hospital was managed by Poole Hospital NHS Foundation Trust until the merger with The Royal Bournemouth and Christchurch Hospitals NHS Foundation Trust on 1 October 2020.

== Location ==
Poole Hospital is situated on Longfleet Road (part of the B3068 road), just below St Mary's Church, in the Longfleet area of Poole approximately 0.5 miles (0.80 km) from the town centre. The hospital's maternity unit lies opposite the main building in St. Mary's Road. The hospital has an adjacent multi-story car park and a total of 307 parking spaces. It is served by several bus routes operated by More Bus.

== History ==
In 1897, Poole's hospital was established inside a mansion house in the town centre. Known as Poole Mansion, the house had been built in 1749 by John Bastard for a prosperous local merchant but had since been bought by local wealthy landowner Ivor Guest, 1st Baron Wimborne. The hospital was named Cornelia Hospital after its benefactress, Lady Cornelia Spencer-Churchill, daughter of the 7th Duke of Marlborough and wife of Ivor Guest. In 1907, the hospital relocated to Longfleet Road to offer patients the "purer air of Longfleet" and to provide space for future expansion. The new hospital, designed by the architect Walter Andrew, cost £3,369 to construct and contained 14 beds.

During the First World War, two additional wards were built with 65 beds for the treatment of wounded servicemen. The hospital was damaged by German air-raids during the Second World War and several of the hospital buildings were rebuilt. In 1947, the Cornelia was renamed "Poole General Hospital" and following the establishment of the National Health Service (NHS) in 1948, it became an NHS hospital. During the 1950s, a new pathology department and an outpatients unit were created and in 1961; a maternity unit was built to the north of the main hospital building.

By 1960, the main hospital buildings required modernisation and work began on a new hospital. Most of the hospital was demolished and replaced with a 500-bed facility with 1,150 staff which cost £5,000,000 to build and equip. The new hospital was formally opened in a ceremony attended by Queen Elizabeth II in July 1969. Further expansion has seen bed numbers increase to 789 and staff numbers increase to some 4,300 employees.

On 23 June 1999, English actor Buster Merryfield died at Poole's hospital died as result of a brain tumour.

It was announced in March 2022 that the accident and emergency department would close by late 2026 as part of the merger and consolidation of services across Poole, Royal Bournemouth and Christchurch hospitals agreed in Dorset's Clinical Services Review.

== Services ==
Poole Hospital provides a range of district hospital care for the 270,000 residents of Poole, Purbeck and east Dorset, and is the major trauma centre for east Dorset. In 2009 the hospital treated 46,815 inpatients, 172,710 outpatients, 17,597-day-cases and 56,557 people attended the Accident & Emergency department. It also provides child health and maternity services for a catchment area which includes Bournemouth and Christchurch, and some specialist services such as neurological care and oral surgery for the entire county. Specialist palliative care is provided in a purpose built unit named Forest Holme.

The hospital houses the Dorset Cancer Centre which is the specialist cancer treatment centre, including comprehensive Radiotherapy services, for adults in Dorset. Child cancer treatment at Poole Hospital is carried out in partnership with the Paediatric Oncology Centre in Southampton General Hospital.

Poole Hospital's maternity unit, known as St Mary's Maternity Hospital, is the centre for high risk maternity care in east Dorset. It provides midwifery and obstetric care, and there are approximately 4,000 deliveries by maternity staff per year across the hospital and community settings.

== Performance ==
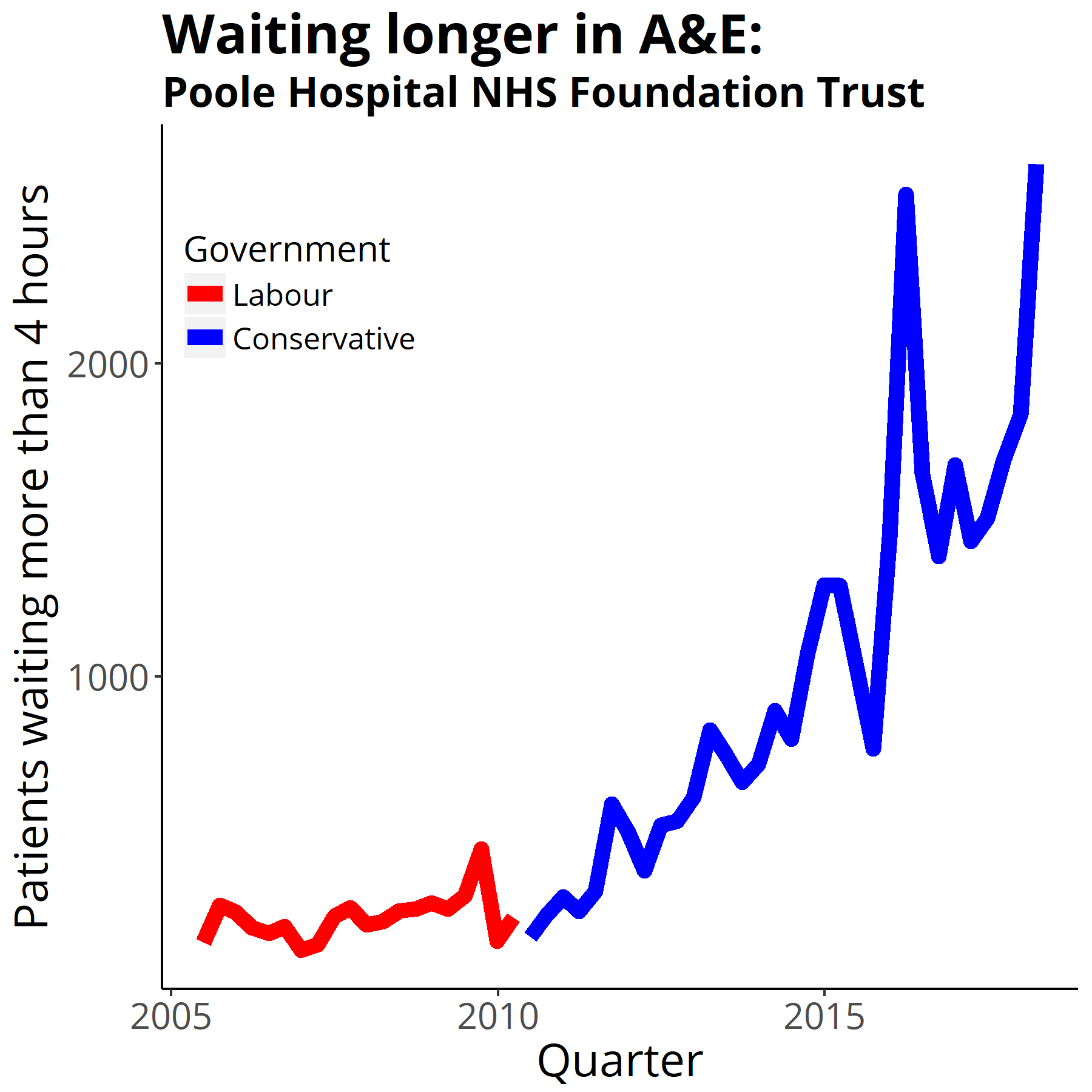
Four-hour target in the emergency department quarterly figures from NHS England Data from https://www.england.nhs.uk/statistics/statistical-work-areas/ae-waiting-times-and-activity/

Poole Hospital is authorised and regulated by Monitor, the independent regulator of NHS foundation trusts. For the period 1 April 2008 to 31 March 2009, the Care Quality Commission's annual assessment gave Poole Hospital an "excellent" rating for quality of services which includes: safety of patients, waiting times and cleanliness. Based on an annual financial risk rating awarded by Monitor, the Care Quality Commission also rated the hospital's quality of financial management as "excellent".

The hospital reported a turnover of £183 million with a surplus of £3.4 million for 2008/09. However, Monitor's quarterly review for 1 January to 31 March 2010 reported that the hospital's financial risk rating had deteriorated from a rating of three to two (five reflects the lowest level of risk and one the highest). In April 2010, it was reported the hospital forecast a budget deficit of £3 million for the year and required £7 million of savings to break even by the end of the following financial year.

Poole General Hospital was named the safest hospital in the UK by the CHKS Patient Safety Awards in 2009. The award was given following an analysis of all UK hospitals which measured hygiene and cleanliness levels and rates of hospital-acquired infections such as MRSA.

== Other hospitals in group ==
- Royal Bournemouth Hospital
- Christchurch Hospital, Dorset

== See also ==
- Healthcare in Dorset
- List of hospitals in England
