= Morebus =

British bus operator

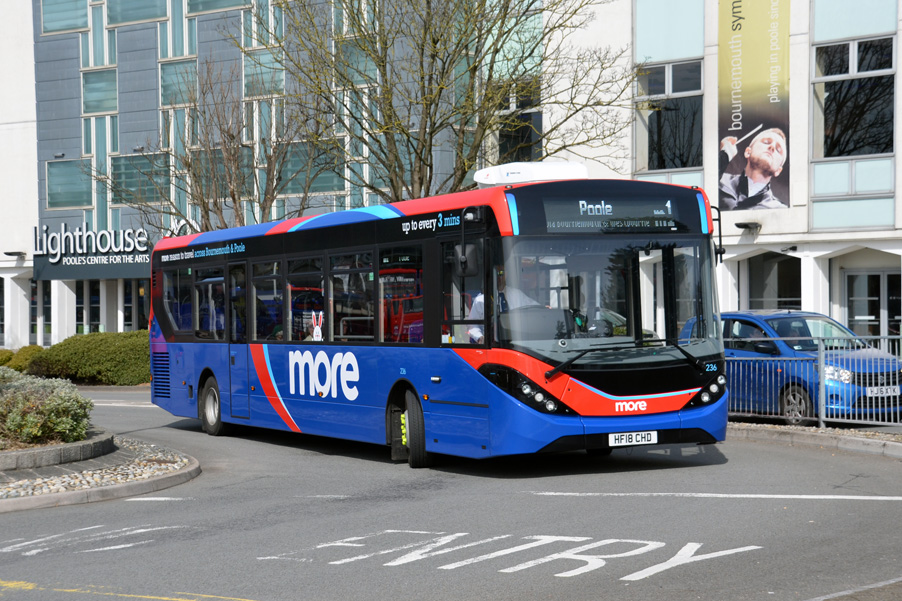
- Alexander Dennis Enviro200 MMC in 2018
- Parent: Go-Ahead Group
- Founded: December 2004
- Headquarters: Poole
- Locale: Dorset
- Service type: Bus services
- Destinations: Bournemouth; Christchurch; Poole; Wimborne Minster; Lymington; Swanage; Salisbury; Southampton
- Operator: Go South Coast
- Chief executive: Ed Wills
- Website: www.morebus.co.uk

morebus (branded as more) is a trading name of bus operator Go South Coast primarily used in Bournemouth, Christchurch and Poole, and the wider Dorset area. Operations in the area were formerly part of the Wilts & Dorset brand, phased out from 2012 onwards.

== History ==
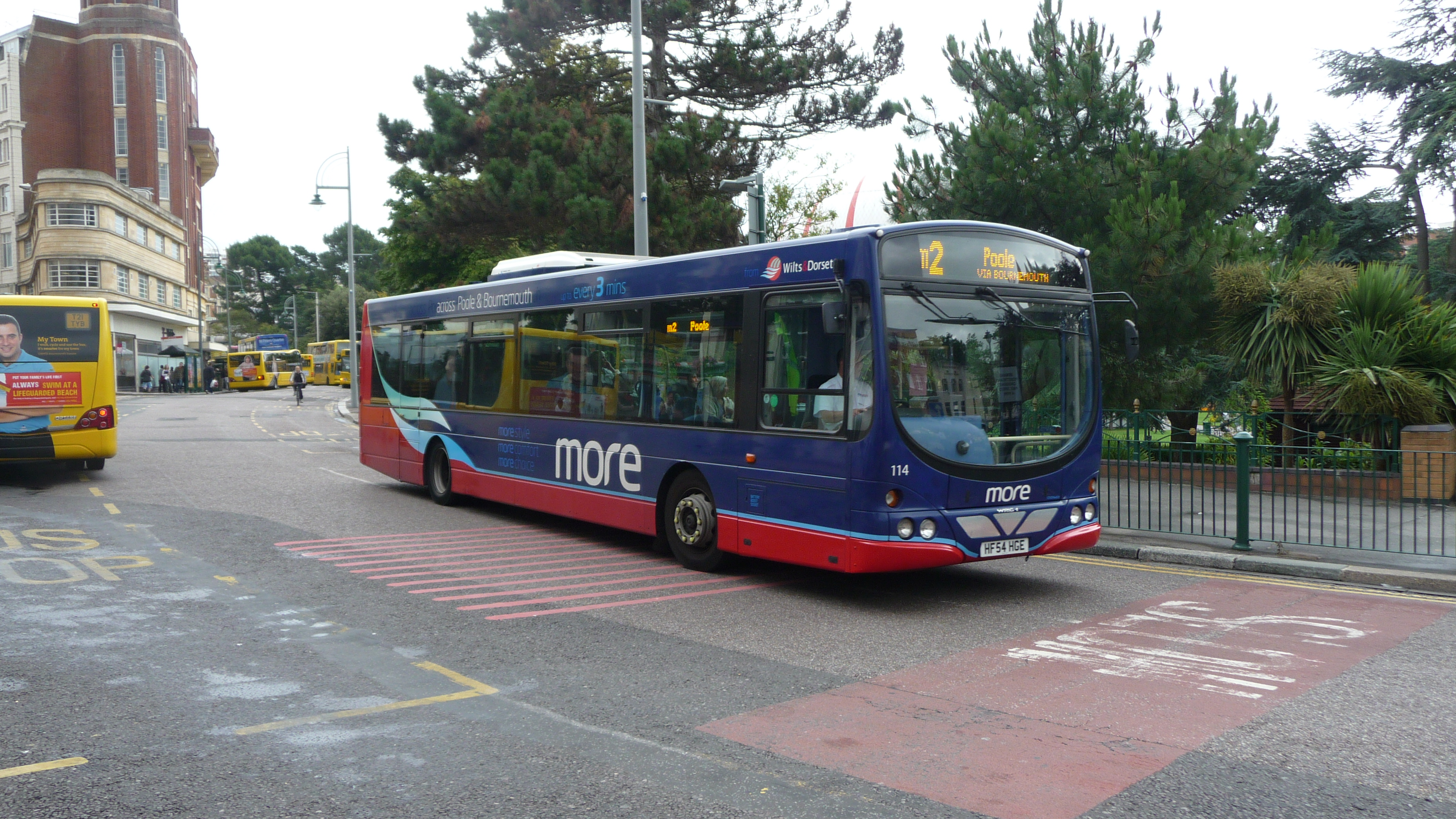
Wright Eclipse bodied Volvo B7RLE in the first more livery in Bournemouth in July 2009

The brand was launched in December 2004 as a premium service replacing routes 101 to 105 between Poole, Bournemouth and Christchurch, and routes 155, 156 and 157 between Poole and Canford Heath. The service launched with 30 Wright Eclipse bodied Volvo B7RLE single-deck buses. The buses carried a livery of mostly dark blue with red at the back; the original 30 also carried slogans such as "looks like a bus, works like a dream."

Such was the success of the more services, the frequency on the m1 and m2 routes was increased, with the m1 extended to the Castlepoint shopping centre on the outskirts of Bournemouth from Bournemouth railway station. With only 30 morebranded buses in the fleet at the time, the branded routes to Canford Heath were discontinued, with the 'm' dropped from the route number and standard liveried vehicles used. For these routes to become more routes again, a batch of Mercedes-Benz Citaros were ordered. The original more buses were going to be Citaros, but it had been thought that Volvo would offer a quicker delivery time. Further changes to the routes occurred on 25 May 2008, with the m2 being withdrawn from Burton (transferred to Route X12 which was also later withdrawn) and Somerford to terminate at Boscombe.

During 2010, the more brand was refreshed with every bus being repainted in a slightly brighter, simpler version of the previous livery, each highlighting a good reason for using the more buses; for example "morefrequent".

In May 2011, routes m5 and m6 were once again dropped from the more brand and renumbered routes 5 and 6.

In June 2012, Go South Coast announced a £5.5 million investment in 36 Wright Eclipse bodied Volvo buses to be used on the m1 and m2 routes, whilst the previous 38 Volvos and Citaros would be cascaded onto other services, replacing older buses. Also at this time, routes 8 and 9 became part of the more brand.

Following the decision by the administrators of Yellow Buses to cease all bus operations in August 2022, Morebus took over several routes and offered a £2000 welcome bonus to recruit existing drivers who had a PCV licence. As a result, Morebus obtained a monopoly in the bus services across Bournemouth, Christchurch and Poole (BCP). The subsidised routes 18, 33 and 36 were then contracted by BCP Council to Xelabus under the Yellow Coaches brand, but these reverted to Morebus since February 2023.

In 2023, Morebus announced a £7.7 million investment in 28 Alexander Dennis Enviro400 MMC buses.

== Services ==
=== Morebus ===
Morebus is the main operating company. It runs roughly 60 public routes, spanning Hythe in the east, Wareham in the west, Swanage in the south and Salisbury in the north. It also operates many school and college services.

=== UniBus ===
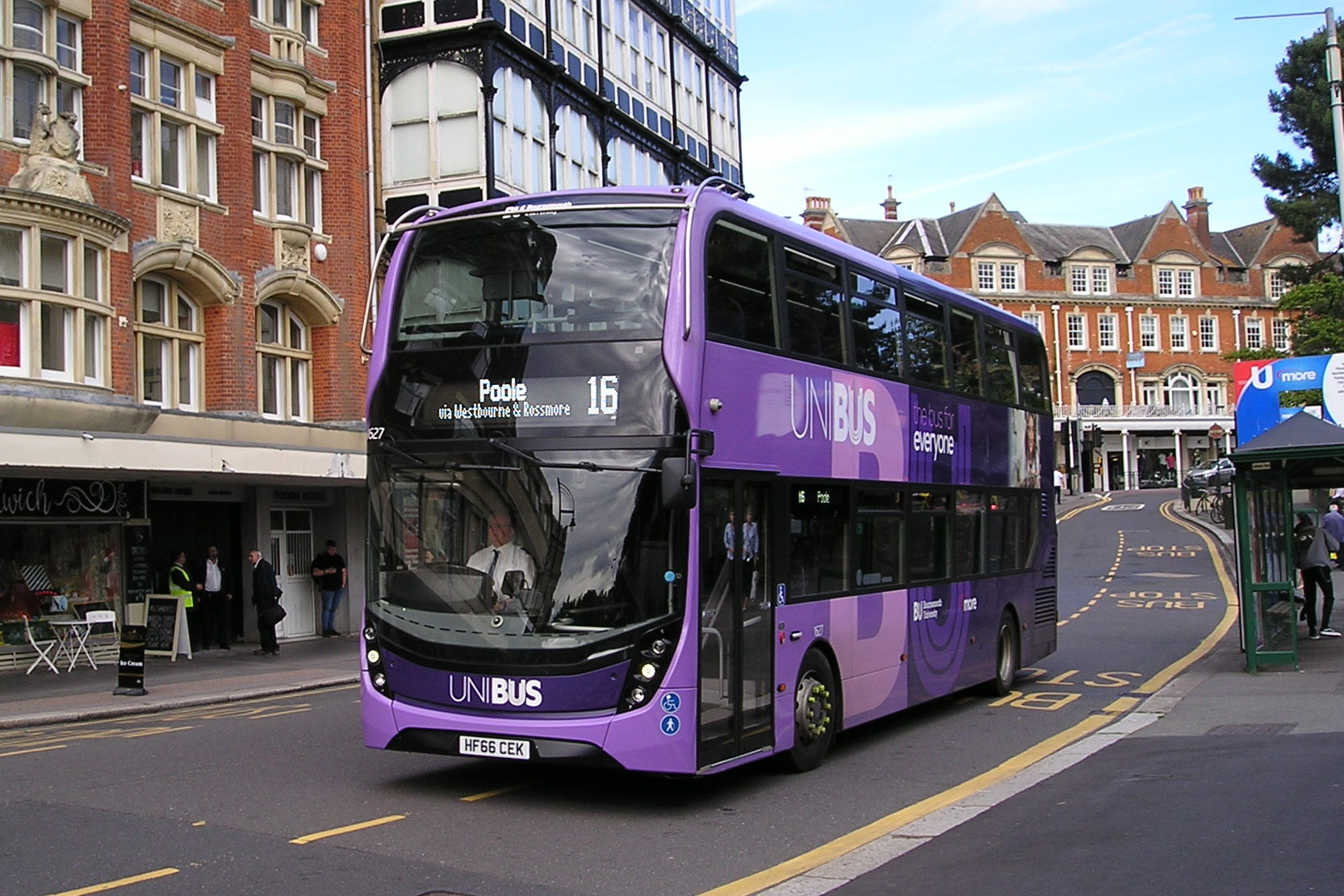
Enviro 400 MMC operating route '16' in 2019.

Morebus operates four routes on behalf of Bournemouth University and Arts University Bournemouth. During the summer of 2016, the services were rebranded as 'Unibus', with new Alexander Dennis Enviro 400 MMC's arriving in a new livery, all with different colour schemes. These buses have WiFi and USB chargers, which passengers can use at no extra cost.

From 2004, when the university contract was transferred to Wilts & Dorset from Yellow Buses, until the end of 2009, services were branded as Unilinx and operated by a mixed fleet of double-deck buses (Optare Spectras and brand-new Volvo B7TL ELC Myllennium Vyking convertibles) painted in a modified version of the 'more' livery. Unilinx-branded buses were also a common sight on non-Unilinx services, especially on service 152 (later the 52) where ELC Myllennium Vyking buses ran open-top throughout the summer.

In 2009, when the university contract was renewed, eight buses (of which six were Scania Enviro 400 double deckers) were used on the U1, U2 and U4 routes, with a Scania Solar single deck bus on the U3 route. These were purchased new, while an ex-London articulated Mercedes-Benz Citaro bus was introduced to route U1 on 10 January 2010, primarily running a shuttle service to boost capacity between Talbot Campus and the student residences at Lansdowne. It was believed to be the first such bus in service on the South Coast, and initially had its route number and destination blinds as part of its livery (including a misspelling of 'Cranborne' as 'Cranbourne') as this bus was used exclusively between Talbot Campus and Cranborne House. From January 2010, these routes were branded as 'The Bus for Bournemouth University' or 'The Bus for BU', with buses appearing in the institution's primary corporate colours of white and pink. For the 2012–2013 academic year, a second articulated bus was acquired.

The university contract was renewed again in 2016, with 12 new ADL Enviro 400MMC buses introduced and in 2022 a new fleet of ADL Enviro 400MMC double decker buses, with USB chargers for smart devices, free WiFi and the low emissions Euro 6 engine were introduced for the university routes, with the older buses reassigned to other morebus services.

In 2023 a new Unibus route, the U5, was introduced to access the university multi-sport site at Chapel Gate. Although this route has been transferred to Tomorrows Travel from September 2025.

=== Breezers ===
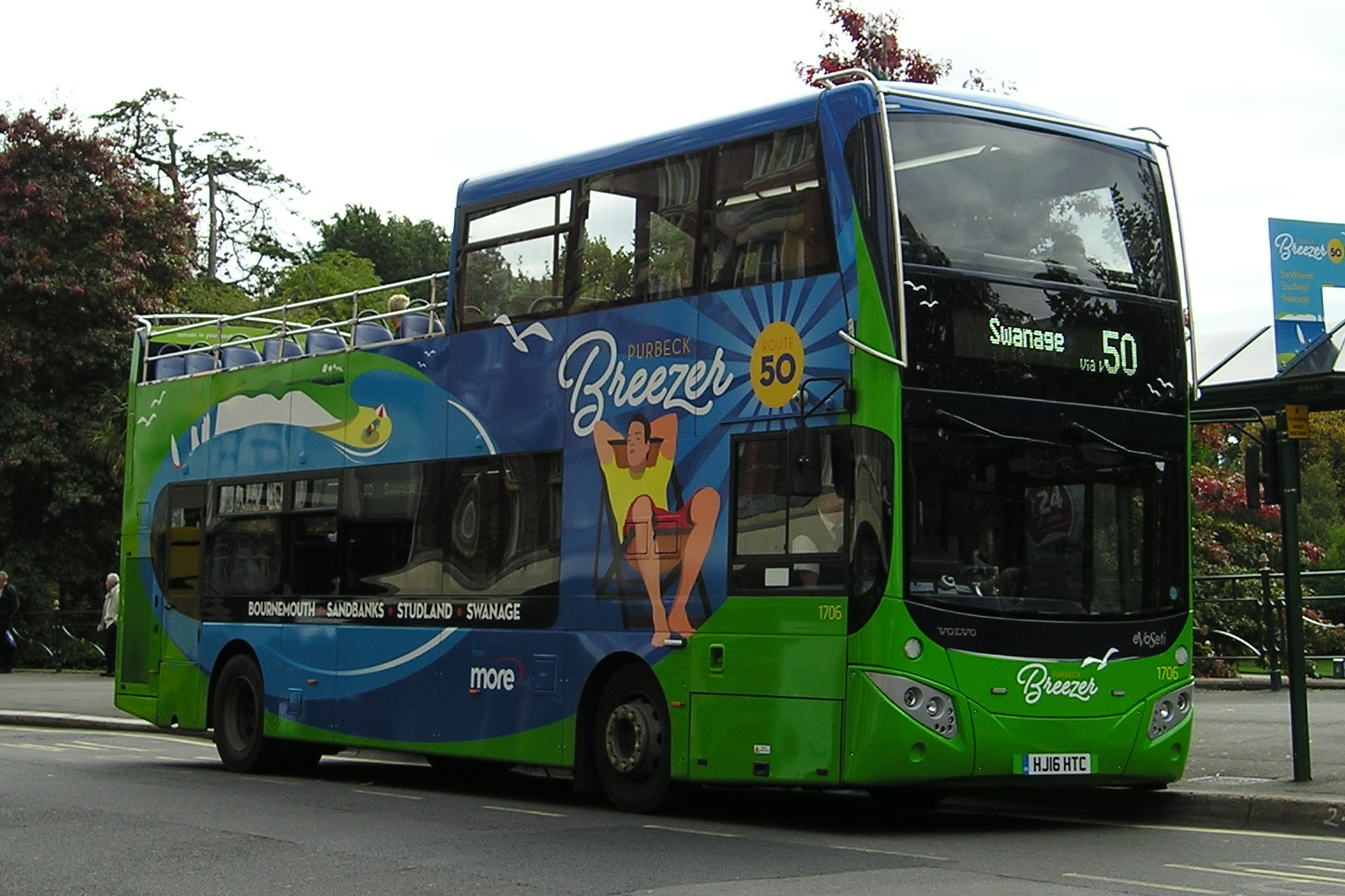
MCV EvoSeti branded for Purbeck Breezer route 50 at Bournemouth in November 2016

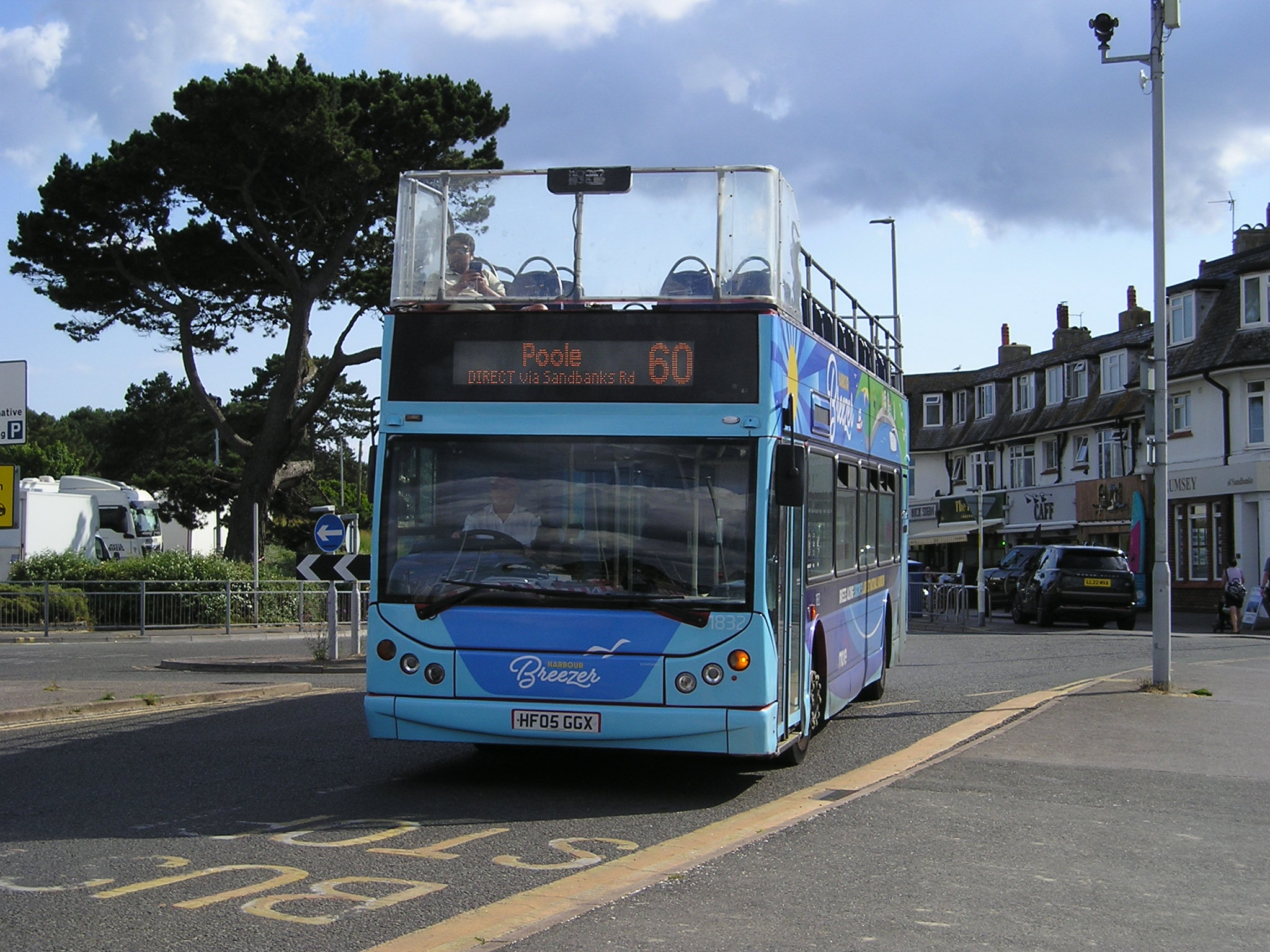
East Lancs Vyking branded for Harbour Breezer route 60 at Sandbanks in June 2023

More operates six all-year services under the Breezer brand, with service 40 going from Poole to Swanage via Wareham and Corfe Castle, service 50 running from Bournemouth railway station to Swanage via the Sandbanks Ferry, service 60 going from Rockley Park to Sandbanks via Poole and Lilliput, service 81 going from Lymington to Bournemouth via Milford on Sea, Barton on Sea and Christchurch, service 82 going from Lymington to Bournemouth via Hordle, New Milton and Christchurch, and service 86 going from Lymington to Southampton via Lyndhurst.

Some services run more frequently in the summer, the - with additional services including service 30 from Swanage to Weymouth (and one trip each way to/from Dorchester), service 31 that goes from Wool Rail Station to Lulworth Cove & Durdle Door, service 35 that goes from Swanage to Wareham Forest and service 70 from Rockley Park to Mudeford. Services 60 and 70 normally use open-topped buses throughout the summer, with service 50 normally running open tops all year round.

As of May 2026, more operates the following Breezer routes:

Jurassic Breezer

- 30: Swanage – Dorchester (via Lulworth Cove)(Summer Only)
- 31: Wool Rail Station – Lulworth Cove & Durdle Door (Summer Only)

Campsite Connect

- 35: Swanage – Wareham Forest (Summer Only)

Purbeck Breezer

- 40: Swanage – Poole (via Wareham)
- 50: Swanage – Bournemouth railway station (via Sandbanks Ferry)

Harbour Breezer

- 60: Rockley Park – Sandbanks (via Poole)

Beach Breezer

- 70: Rockley Park – Mudeford (via Alum Chine, Boscombe Pier and Hengistbury Head)(Summer Only)

New Forest Breezer

- 81: Lymington – Bournemouth (via Milford on Sea, Barton on Sea and Christchurch)
- 82: Lymington – Bournemouth (via Hordle, New Milton and Christchurch)
- 86: Lymington – Southampton (via Lyndhurst)

=== The New Forest Tour ===
Morebus operate a group of open-top circular tourist routes in the New Forest using buses operated jointly by Bluestar and Morebus.

=== Coach operations ===
==== Damory ====
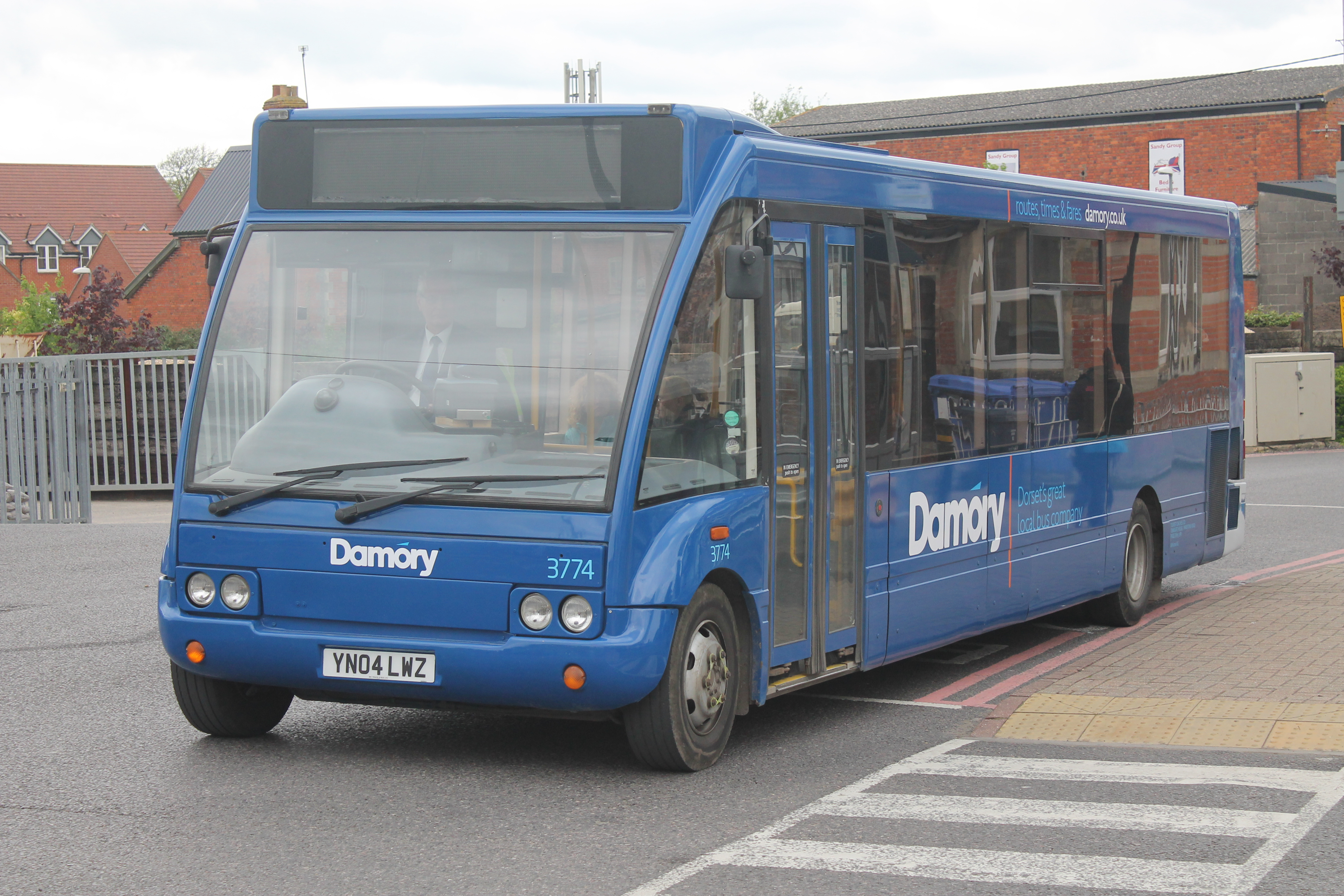
Optare Solo at Gillingham, Dorset in May 2013

Damory operates school bus services as well as some public services primarily within west Dorset such as service CR8 to Weymouth via Dorchester from its Blandford Forum depot. In October 2013 it commenced operating the Rossmore Flyer from Alderney to Upper Parkstone, now cascaded into morebus routes 7A, 7B and 7C. Later in 2015, it had purchased five new Optare Solos to run primarily on its local Dorchester services. The parent company introduced six Caetano Levante buses that were previously used by National Express for school services in February 2018.

It also operates as a private hire company, with it originally created by the purchasing and merging of Damory Coaches, Oakfield Travel, and Blandford Bus Company.

==== Excelsior Coaches ====
Excelsior Coaches is a private hire brand which commenced when Morebus purchased Excelsior Motorways following the retirement of its owner in October 2016.

== See also ==
- List of bus operators of the United Kingdom
- Wilts & Dorset
- New Forest Tour
