= Healthcare in Dorset =

Healthcare in Dorset has been the responsibility of one integrated care board (ICB) since July 2022. This replaced the former Dorset clinical commissioning group (CCG).

The NHS Dorset Integrated Care Board, covers the areas governed by the unitary authorities of Bournemouth, Christchurch and Poole and Dorset.

== History ==
From 1947 to 1965 NHS services in Dorset were managed partly by South-West Metropolitan Regional Hospital Board and partly by the South-Western Regional Hospital Board, which was responsible for the Lyme Regis area. In 1965 a new board was formed for Wessex which also covered Dorset apart from Lyme Regis. In 1974 the boards were abolished and replaced by regional health authorities. The whole of Dorset came under the Wessex RHA. Regions were reorganised in 1996 and Dorset came under the South and West Regional Health Authority. Dorset had an area health authority from 1974 until 1982 when it was divided into two district health authorities for East and West Dorset which were amalgamated in 1992. Regional health authorities were reorganised and renamed strategic health authorities in 2002. Dorset was part of Dorset and Somerset SHA. In 2006 regions were again reorganised and Dorset came under NHS South West until that was abolished in 2013. There were two primary care trusts for the area: Bournemouth & Poole Teaching PCT and Dorset PCT.

Dorset County Council lead in the development of an electronic health record, called the Dorset Care Record, provided by Orion Health. It enables all health and social care providers to share records.

The Winton Health Centre, which had 10,000 patients registered, is now permanently closed.

== Health system ==
=== Clinical Services Review ===
In October 2014, Dorset Clinical Commissioning Group launched a major review into the way healthcare is provided across the county. Plans included developing a "major emergency hospital" with 24-hour access to consultants at Royal Bournemouth Hospital, with Poole Hospital becoming the centre for planned care, according to plans agreed by the CCG in May 2015.

=== Sustainability and transformation plan ===
Dorset formed a sustainability and transformation plan area in March 2016 with Tim Goodson, the Chief Officer of Dorset Clinical Commissioning Group as its leader. It faced a shortfall of £229 million in 2020. It was the first area to start formal consultation.

As of 2017, the main proposal is for the centralisation of emergency hospital services in Bournemouth and the establishment of a single cancer service and a single cardiac service for the county. Poole hospital would become a Major Planned Care Hospital with fewer beds. The 13 community hospitals will be reduced to seven 'community hubs' with beds and a further five 'community hubs' without beds. The community hospitals at Alderney, Westhaven and St Leonards would close. The community hubs would permit outpatient appointments outside of acute hospitals. The plan hopes to deliver a 25% reduction in unplanned medical admissions and 20% reduction in unplanned surgical admissions. That would mean 100,000 patients a year treated close to home rather than in hospital. A corresponding reduction in the number of GP practices is anticipated.

University Hospitals Dorset NHS Foundation Trust and Dorset HealthCare University NHS Foundation Trust agreed in September 2022 that they would share the Chair and Chief Executive roles although there are no plans for the trusts to merge.

=== Judicial review ===
In late 2017 the plans to reorganise NHS hospital services in Dorset were laid out in full by Dorset Clinical Commissioning Group (CCG) and were unanimously agreed by health leaders. The plans aimed to create a Major Planned Care Hospital at Poole and a Major Emergency Hospital at Bournemouth as well as reduce a projected £158m-a-year funding shortfall. However campaigners against the changes claim that at least 183 people a year would die as a result of the longer travel time to access emergency treatment. A judicial review was brought before the high court in September 2018 by the Defend Dorset NHS campaign group, claiming longer travel times for emergency care would risk patient safety; however the High Court judge ruled in favour of the CCG. In his final judgement, judge Sir Stephen Silber said:

I appreciate that some residents of Dorset will be disappointed by this decision, but it might be some compensation for them to know that the claimant's case has been very well argued, as has the case for the CCG.

The campaign group Defend Dorset NHS, challenged the high court decision one year later in the court of appeal, but the previous judgement was upheld. The finally hurdle for the merger was overcome in April 2020 when the Competition and Markets Authority (the successor to Competition Commission) approved the merger.

== Services ==
=== Public health ===
In 2012 public health responsibilities were transferred away for the NHS to local authorities. Public Health Dorset was established as a partnership of Bournemouth Borough Council, Poole Borough Council, and Dorset County Council.

=== Primary care ===
As of 2016, there are 98 GP practices, operating at 135 sites, in the county. Out-of-hours services are provided by South Western Ambulance Service NHS Foundation Trust.

A private GP service was established at Poole Road Medical Centre in Bournemouth in 2017 where patients can pay to skip waiting lists to see a doctor.

=== Community care ===
Macmillan Caring Locally is based in Dorset, supporting cancer patients in the county. Dorset HealthCare University NHS Foundation Trust is responsible for all community and mental health services across the county.

Palliative care is provided by Forest Holme Hospice and the Lewis-Manning Hospice in Poole, Weldmar Hospicecare Trust in Dorchester, and Julia's House in Bournemouth.

Dorset HealthCare runs the wheelchair service in Dorset.

Dorset Council, established in 2019, is responsible for social care. In 2021 it set up a pilot study with Intelligentlilli, using the company's machine learning technology to reduce the frequency of daily visits to newly-discharged patients and enabling people to remain at home rather than go into residential care.

=== Acute care ===
The main hospital providers are University Hospitals Dorset NHS Foundation Trust and Dorset County Hospital NHS Foundation Trust.

Proposals to merger Poole Hospital NHS Foundation Trust with The Royal Bournemouth and Christchurch Hospitals NHS Foundation Trust in order to save money were blocked by the Competition Commission in 2013. Both trusts said they were "deeply disappointed" and felt the merger was the best option to ensure "high-quality hospital services to local people".

The merger between Bournemouth and Poole was proposed again in 2016 because "the many benefits associated with these Clinical Services Review changes could be achieved more easily under one management structure.” In 2020 it was finally agreed that Poole Hospital A&E department would be downgraded and emergency services concentrated in Bournemouth. Poole Hospital will get a new urgent treatment centre and 14 surgical theatres. The merger went ahead in October 2020.

== Healthwatch Dorset ==
Healthwatch Dorset, an organisation set up under the Health and Social Care Act 2012 to act as a voice for patients, organised mystery shopping in Spring 2014, visiting every practice to see how easy it was to make a complaint. Their report was generally favourable. It has over 250 volunteers, and won the 'Making a Difference through Volunteering' Award in the national 'Healthwatch Network Awards of Achievement 2015, which had 150 entries.
