= History of Poole =

The history of Poole, a town in Dorset, England, can be traced back to the founding of a settlement around Poole Harbour during the Iron Age. The town now known as Poole was founded on a small peninsula to the north of the harbour. Poole experienced rapid growth as it became an important port following the Norman Conquest of England.

Poole Museum tells the story of a town and a people shaped by the sea. The Discover and Research Room hold a wide range of resources to further explore Poole's history.

== Toponymy ==
The town's name derives from the Old English words pool which means a place near a pool or creek and pol which was given to people who lived near a small body of water. Variants include Pool, Pole, Poles, Poll, Polle, Polman, and Poolman.

== Early history ==
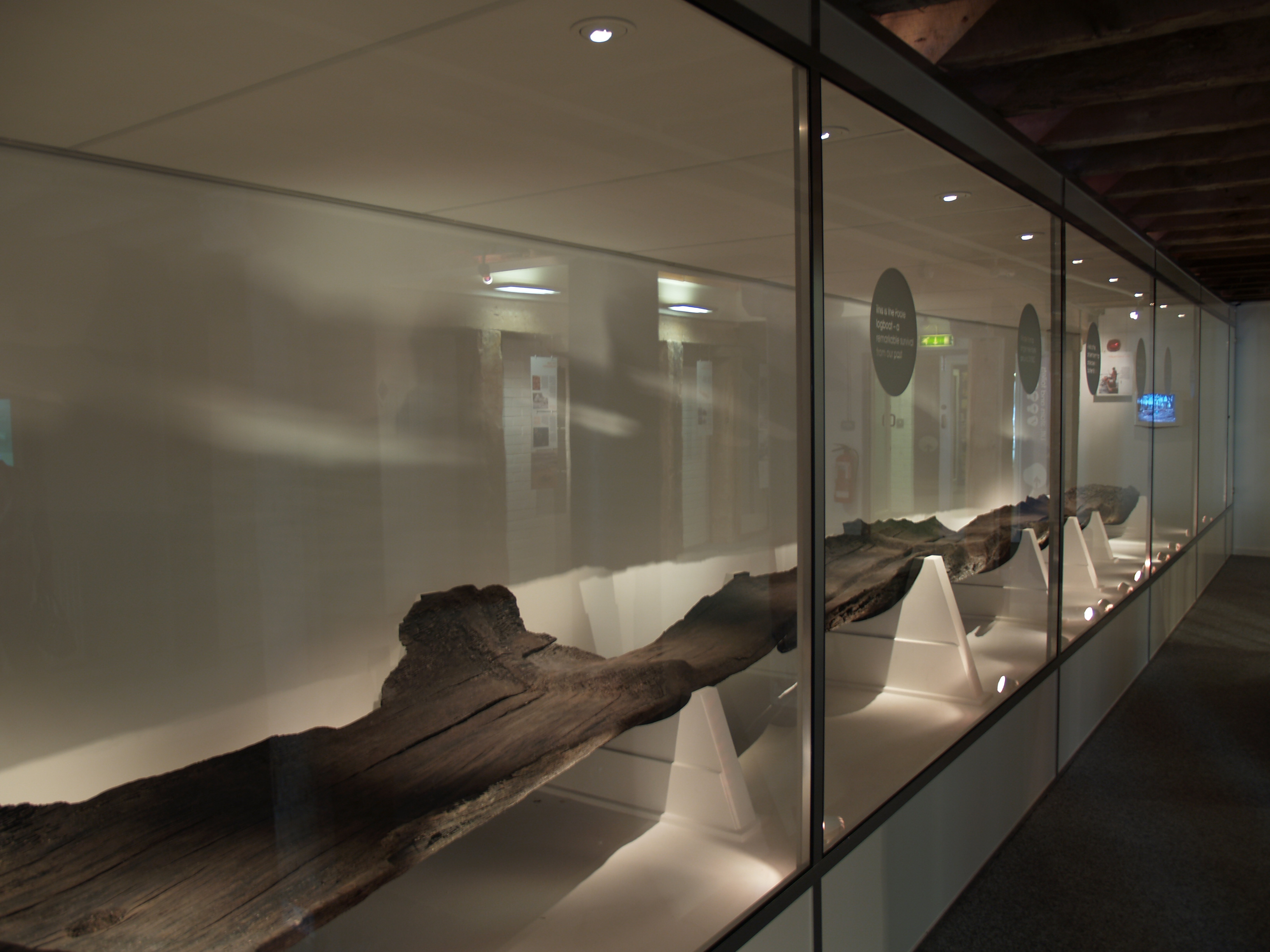
The Poole Logboat in Poole Museum is over 2,000 years old and made from a single oak tree.

The Poole Harbour area has been inhabited for at least 2,500 years. During the Iron Age, Celtic people known as the Durotriges lived in Dorset, particularly around Wareham, five miles (8 km) to the west. In the 3rd century BC, these Celtic people moved from hilltop settlements, such as Maiden Castle and Badbury Rings on the chalk downs to the north, to the lower vales and heathland around the River Frome and Poole Harbour. This marshy area may have lent its name to the Durotriges, which means "water dwellers". The Durotriges engaged in cross-channel trading at Poole with the Veneti, a seafaring tribe from Brittany. The earliest significant archaeological find in the harbour is the Poole Logboat, a 10 metres (33 ft) boat made from a single oak tree and dating to 295 BC. During that time, the harbour was shallower than it is today and any settlement would now be under water.

Poole was one of a number of harbouring sites along the south coast of Britain where the Romans landed during their conquest of Britain the 1st century. The Roman Emperor, Vespasian, brought the Second Augustan Legion to the harbour in 43 AD and founded Hamworthy, an area just west of the modern town centre. The Romans continued to use the harbour throughout the occupation.

== Middle Ages ==
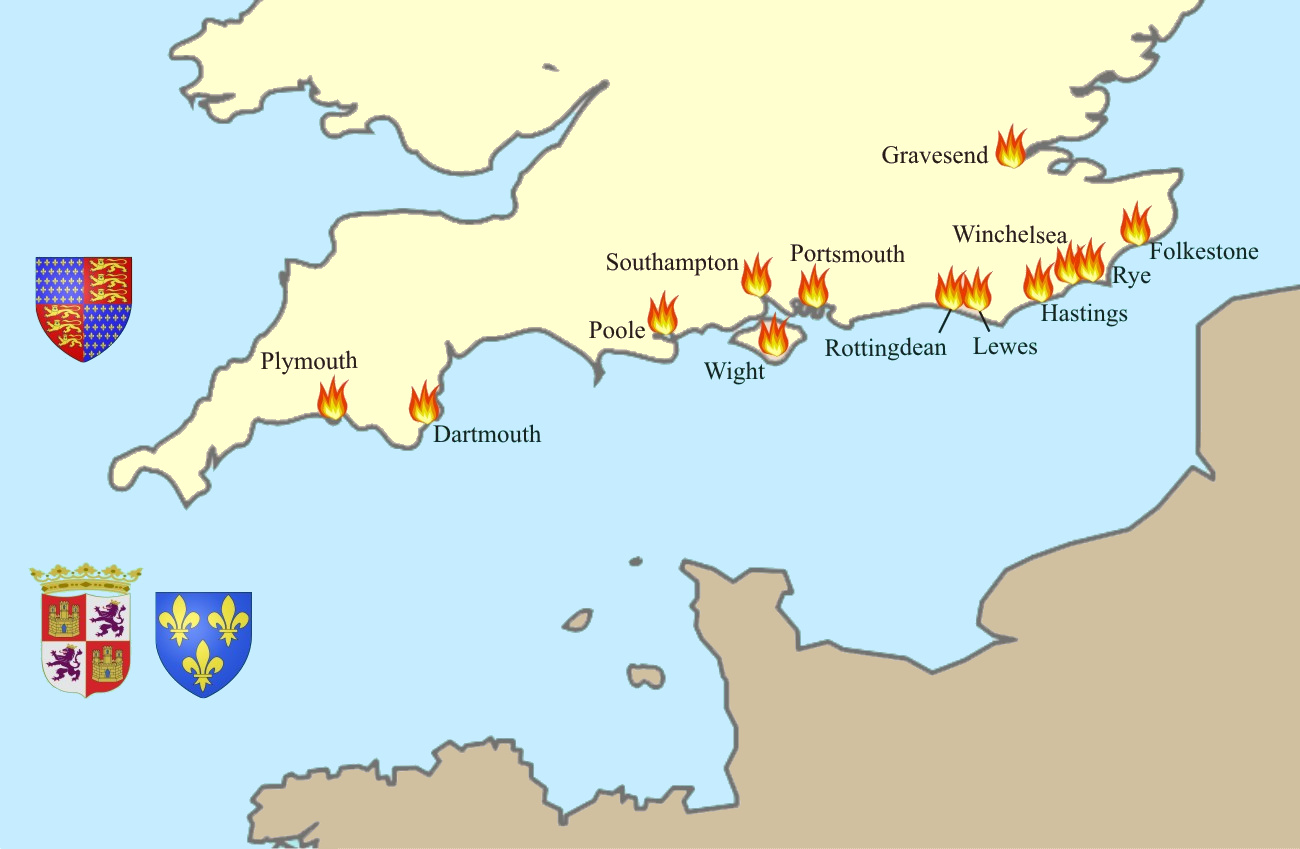
Main attacks on England by Tovar and Vienne during the Hundred Years' War(1374–1380).

Following the Saxon invasion of southwestern Britain in the 7th century, Poole was included in the newly established Kingdom of Wessex. Poole was used as a base for fishing and a place for ships to anchor on their way to Wareham, an important Saxon stronghold. A Danish Viking army captured Wareham in 876 but they were besieged and defeated by a Saxon army led by Alfred the Great. The Danish fleet retreated though Poole Harbour but most of their longships sank in a violent storm off the coast of Poole Bay and Studland. The Danes returned to England under Canute the Great in 1015. He led his fleet to Poole Harbour which he used as a base to pillage the surrounding settlements of Wessex before returning along the coast to attack London.

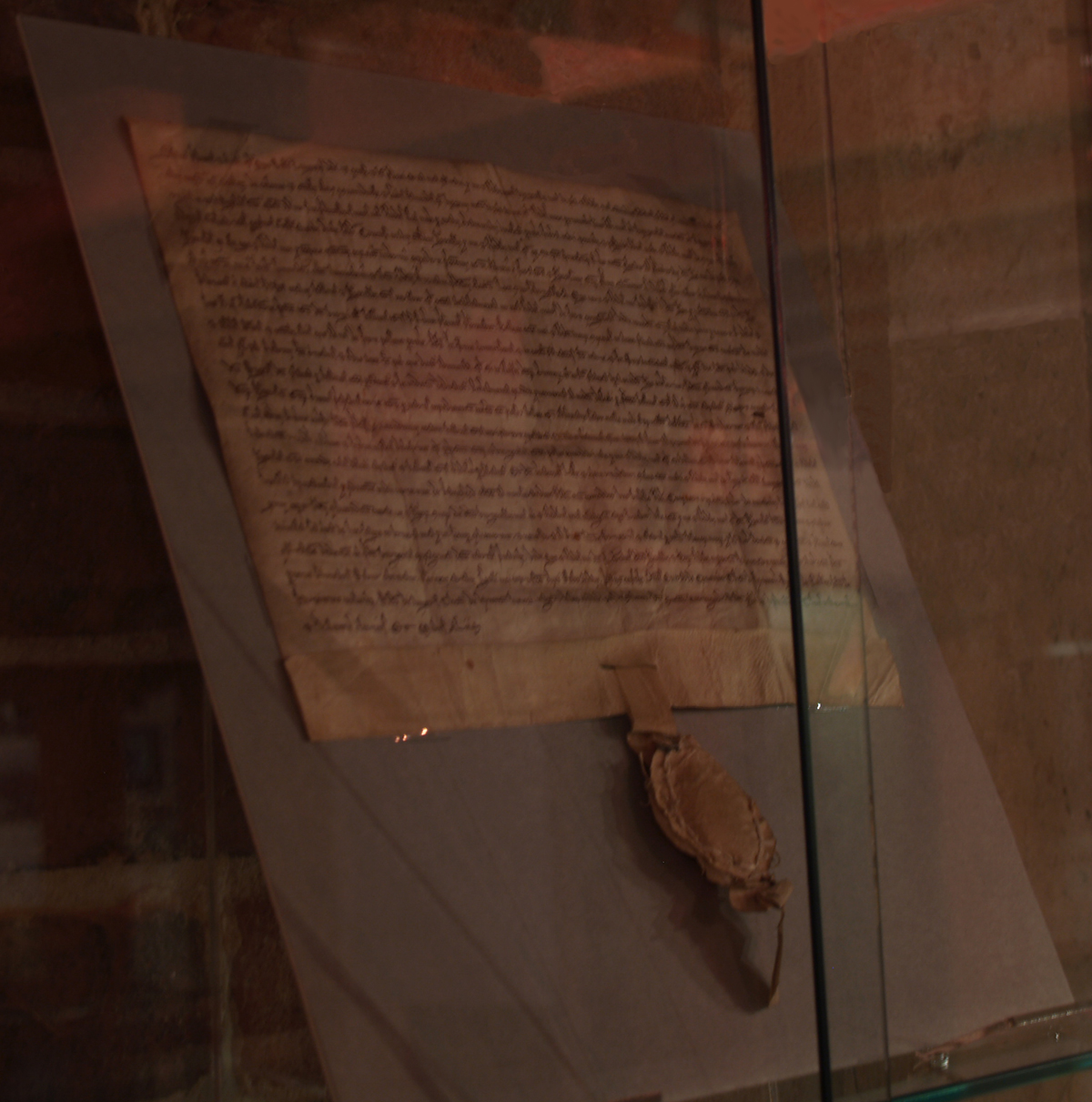
The original charter issued to Poole by William de Longespee in 1248

Poole remained a small fishing town until the Norman Conquest. During the 12th and 13th centuries the maritime and fishing trade of Poole grew as the importance of Wareham declined. A charter of liberties was sold to the Burgesses of Poole in 1248 by the Lord of the manor and son of the Earl of Salisbury, Sir William Longspee, to raise funds for his participation the Seventh Crusade. As a result of this charter, Poole obtained the right to appoint a mayor, hold a court within town, and was granted an exemption from certain tolls and customs duties on goods from the Port.

A French and Spanish naval fleet attacked Poole in 1405, burning and looting much of the town in revenge for the exploits of Poole privateer captain Harry Paye. Paye frequently led successful raids against the Spanish and French along the coast from Normandy through to the Bay of Biscay and Cape Finisterre. Despite this setback, the town continued to grow and became the biggest port in Dorset. In 1433 it was granted Port of the Staple status by King Henry VI, which enabled Poole to begin the lucrative trade of wool exportation. This status also allowed Poole to receive a licence for the construction of fortifications; a wall and ditch were constructed and a stone gatehouse was erected on the northern side of the town.

== Early modern history ==
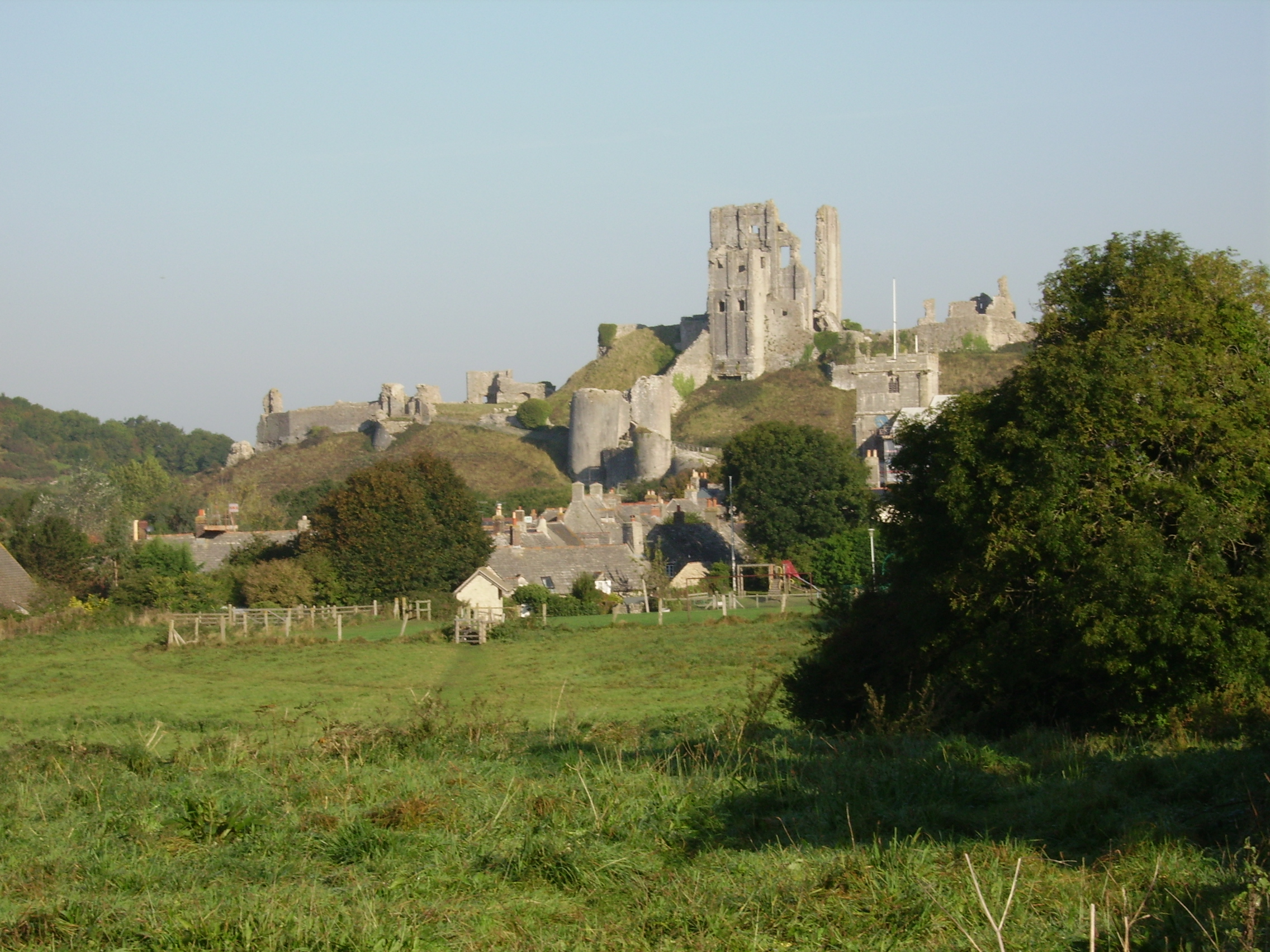
Corfe Castle was besieged and captured by the Parliamentary garrison from Poole during the English Civil War.

During the English Civil War Poole was staunchly puritan and a Parliamentary stronghold within a mostly Royalist Dorset. Nearby, Wimborne and the Bankes family in nearby Corfe Castle had sided with King Charles. The walled town of Poole constantly under the threat of siege but remained one of Cromwell's strongholds until the end of the war. In 1646 with the Royalists on the verge of defeat, the Parliamentary army from Poole laid siege to Corfe Castle. The defence of the castle was led by Dame Mary Bankes, who had successfully defended the castle from siege in 1643. She might have repelled the siege again, but for the perfidy of one of her men, Colonel Pitman, who betrayed her. Parliament ordered the destruction of the castle to ensure that it could never stand again as a Royalist stronghold, but in recognition of Dame Mary's bravery, the besiegers presented her with the keys of the castle, now on display at another Bankes property, Kingston Lacy near Wimborne Minster. Upon the restoration of the monarchy Poole's defences were demolished on the orders of King Charles II.

The town continued to grow in importance despite the effects of piracy. In 1568, Poole was granted a greater amount of independence from Dorset when it was made a county corporate by the Great Charter of Queen Elizabeth I. The Great Charter also granted Poole the title of 'the County of the Town of Poole', a name it retained until the 18th century.

Poole established successful commerce with the North American colonies, including the important fisheries of Newfoundland that later resulted in significant lasting trade. By the mid 16th century records show that large quantities of salt, an essential ingredient for the salt cod trade, was being landed at Poole. Over the next fifty years the trade with Newfoundland steadily grew to meet the demand for fish from the Catholic countries of Europe. Poole's share of this trade varied but the most prosperous period of trade started in the early 18th century and lasted until the early 19th century. The trade was a three-cornered route; ships went out to Newfoundland loaded with salt and provisions. Caught, dried, and salted in Newfoundland, the fish was brought back to ports in Spain, Portugal and Italy. Finally the ships returned to Poole with wine, olive oil, dried fruits, and salt.

== Modern history ==
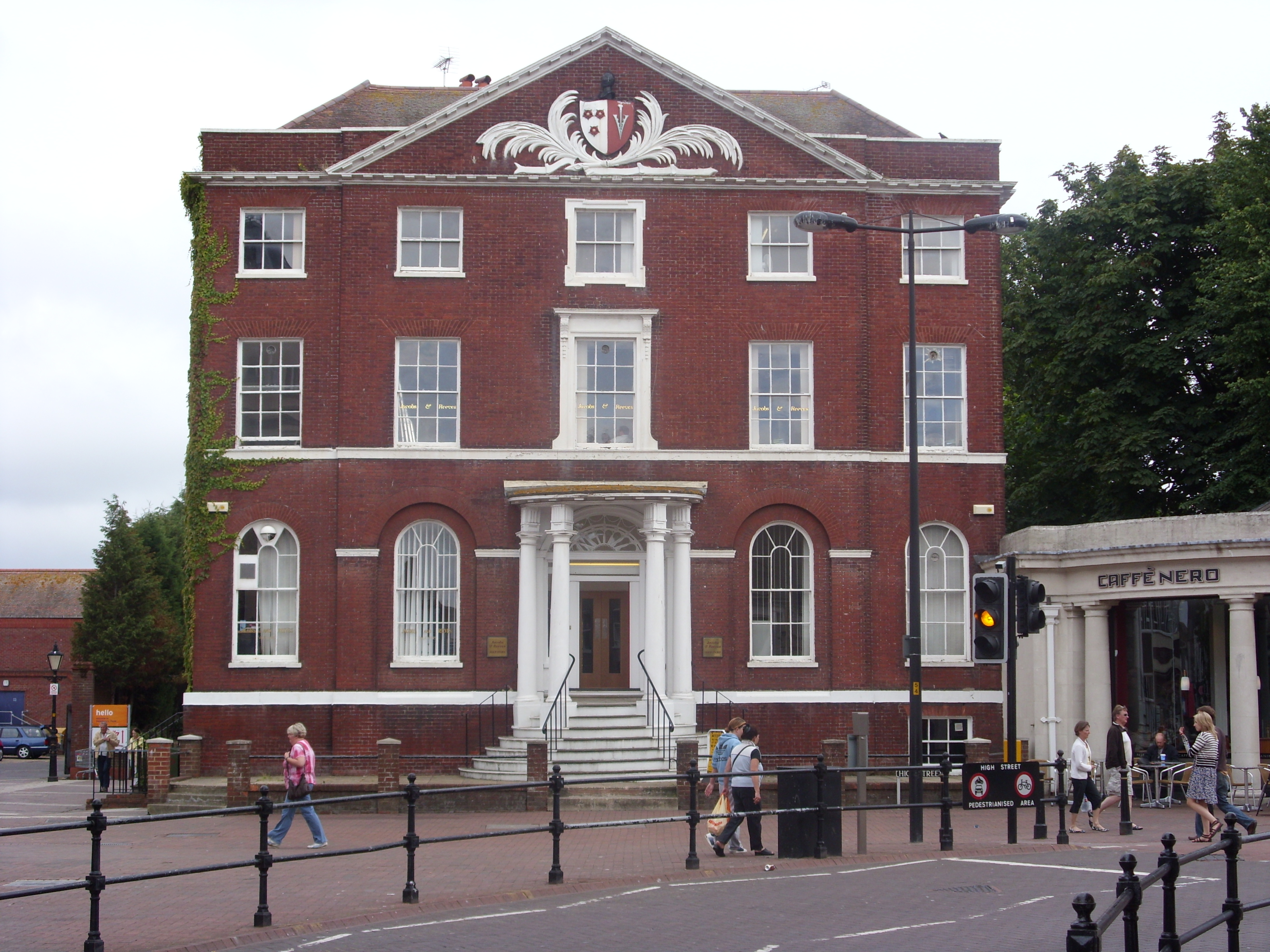
Beech Hurst on Poole High Street, built in 1798 for Samuel Rolles, a wealthy merchant

In the early 18th century, Poole had more ships trading with North America than any other English port, which brought vast wealth to Poole's merchants. This prosperity supported much of the development which now characterises the Old Town near the Quay. Many of the town's Medieval buildings were replaced with extravagant Georgian houses, many of which can still be seen. Examples include Sir Peter Thompson's 1746 Grade I listed mansion designed by John Bastard, and Beech Hurst, a Grade II* listed mansion built on Poole High Street in 1789.

The end of the Napoleonic Wars in 1814 and the conclusion of the War of 1812 changed the fortunes of Poole's Newfoundland merchants. Peace meant that the French and Americans could fish the waters and take over many of the services provided by Poole merchants at a lower cost. The result was rapid decline in trade and within a few years most of the merchants had ceased trading. In 1830, King Charles X of France landed at Poole Quay after fleeing during the Second French Revolution.

The town grew rapidly during the Industrial Revolution as urbanisation took place and the town became both an area of mercantile prosperity and of overcrowded poverty. At the turn of the 19th century, nine out of ten workers in Poole were engaged in harbour activities, but as the century progressed ships became too large for the shallow harbour and the port began losing business to the deep water ports at Liverpool, Southampton and Plymouth. In 1847 Poole's first railway station opened in Hamworthy and later extended to the centre of Poole in 1872, effectively ending the port's busy coastal shipping trade. The Royal National Lifeboat Institution (RNLI) stationed a lifeboat at Sandbanks in 1865. The crew had to travel in a horse-drawn carriage from the Antelope Hotel in Poole High Street whenever it was launched so it was moved to a new Poole Lifeboat Station at the Fisherman's Dock on Poole Quay in 1882.

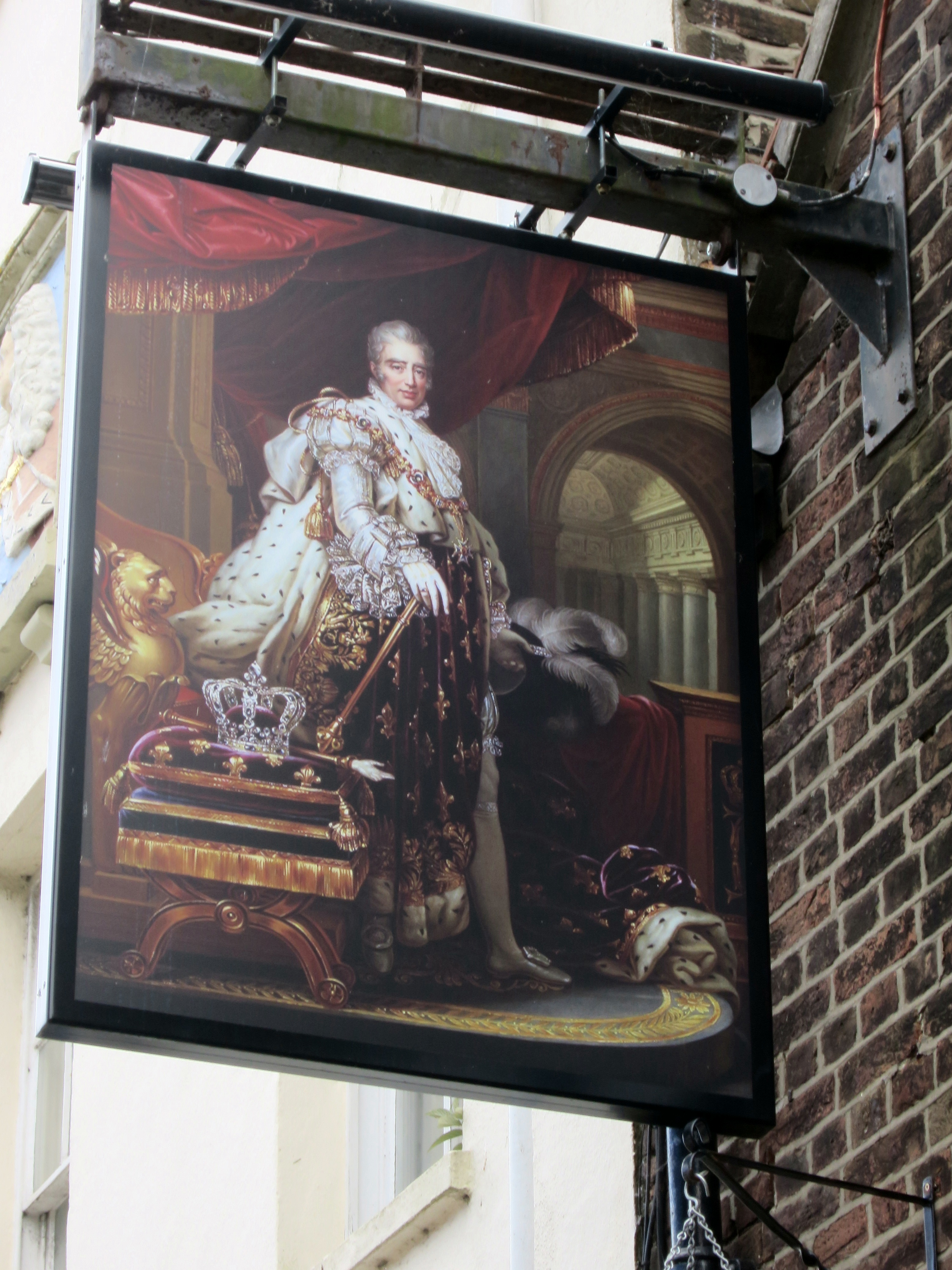
The medieval King Charles Pub is named after Charles X of France

During the 19th century the beaches and landscape of southern Dorset and south-west Hampshire began to attract tourists and the villages to the east of Poole began to grow and merge until the seaside resort of Bournemouth emerged. Although Poole did not become a resort like many surrounding towns, it continued to grow as the rapid expansion of Bournemouth created a large demand for goods manufactured in Poole. In 1897, the Haven Hotel in Poole was the site of some of Marconi's wireless experiments. Marconi was able to receive radio signals in Poole sent from Alum Bay, Isle of Wight, 20 miles (32 km) away.

== World War II and redevelopment ==
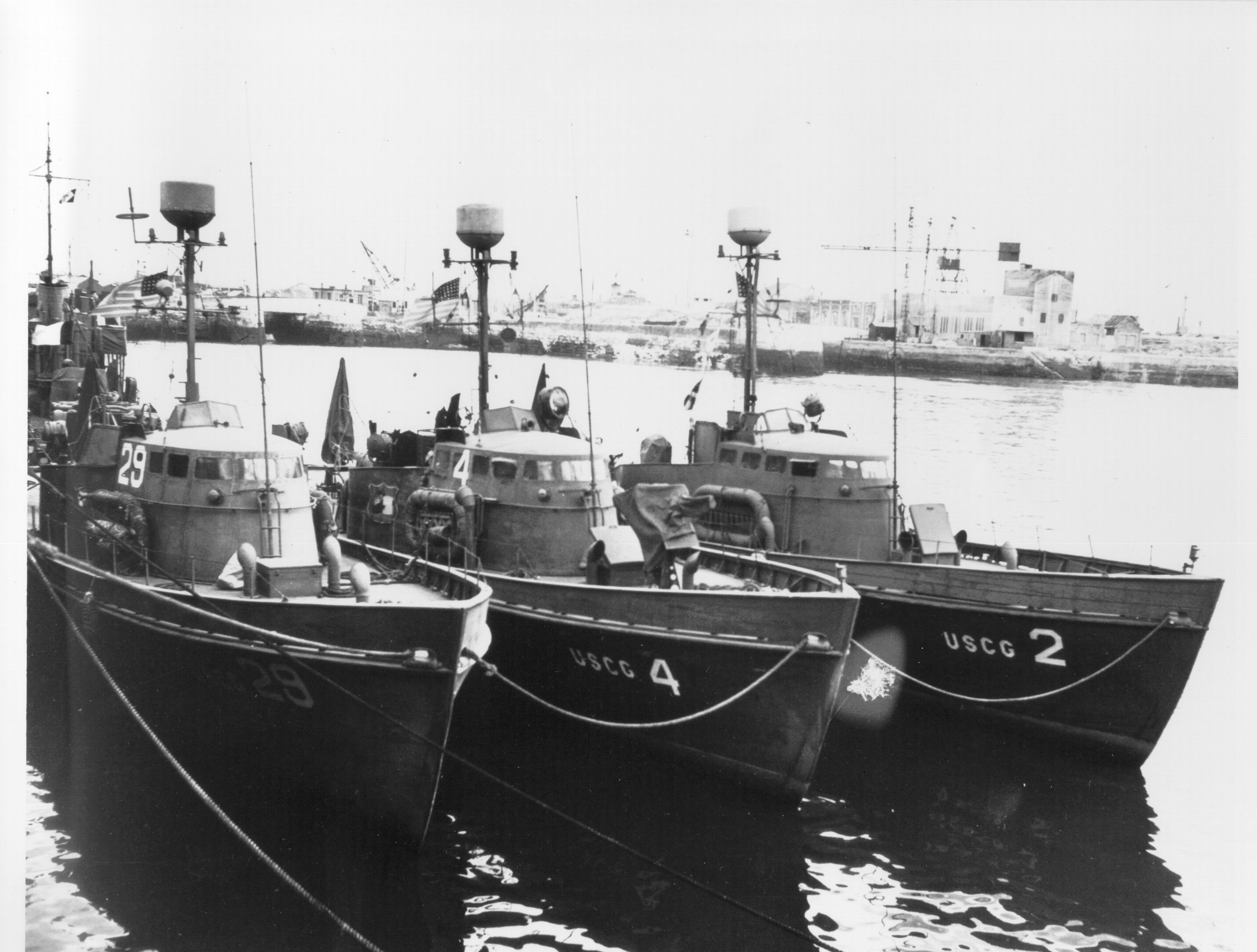
US Coast Guard cutters moored in Poole Harbour in 1944.

Although there was no embarkation of troops from Poole, its shipyards made a major contribution to Operation Neptune: their landing craft would have carried some 10,000 troops (30-35 per craft) to the beaches in June 1944 and Poole-built minesweepers and gun and torpedo boats helped clear the path for the troop ships and weaken the shore defences. Poole was also an important centre for the development of Combined Operations and it was the base for the US Coast Guard's 'Rescue Flotilla One' of 60 cutters. The cutters patrolled the D-Day invasion areas, with 30 serving off of the British and Canadian sectors and 30 serving off the American sectors. A US Coast Guard ensign is buried at St James' Church and a plaque on the quayside given by the United States Coast Guard commemorates the cutters departure for the Normandy Invasion and expresses appreciation for the kindness of the people of Poole to the crews.

Many of the town's buildings suffered bombing during the Second World War and years of neglect in the post-war economic decline in the United Kingdom. Slum housing was visible in Poole town centre as late as 1959. Major redevelopment projects began across the town in the 1960s. Large areas of slum properties were demolished and replaced with modern public housing, Poole General Hospital was built in 1969, and a large indoor shopping centre called the Arndale Centre (now known as the Dolphin Centre) was also finished that year.

Many of Poole's historic buildings were also demolished during this period, especially in the Old Town area of Poole. Consequently, a 15-acre (61,000 m^{2}) Conservation Area was created in Poole Town Centre in 1975 to preserve some of Poole's most notable buildings. The RNLI moved its headquarters from London to Poole in 1974. This year also saw the lifeboat station at Fisherman's Dock close for conversion into a lifeboat museum. The lifeboat operated from a new station at Lilliput Marina until 1989 when it was moved to a new site on Poole Quay by Poole Bridge. The Poole chemical explosion of 1988 caused 3,500 people to be evacuated out of the town centre in the biggest peacetime evacuation the country had seen since the World War II.

Building regeneration projects include the demolition of Hamworthy (Poole) power station in the early 1990s and the redevelopment of the old gas works. The latter has become part of the Poole Quarter, a housing project near the town centre, comprising 512 new homes. Other projects include the renovated Lighthouse arts centre, Baiter Park on Parkstone Bay, and the new Royal National Lifeboat Institution headquarters. The construction boom was acknowledged in 2007, when the Borough of Poole received an award celebrating the best of the British construction industry.

Poole was administrated by Dorset County Council until 1997, after which it became a unitary authority under Poole Borough Council. In 2019, Poole became part of the Bournemouth, Christchurch and Poole unitary authority area.
