= Dolphin Shopping Centre =

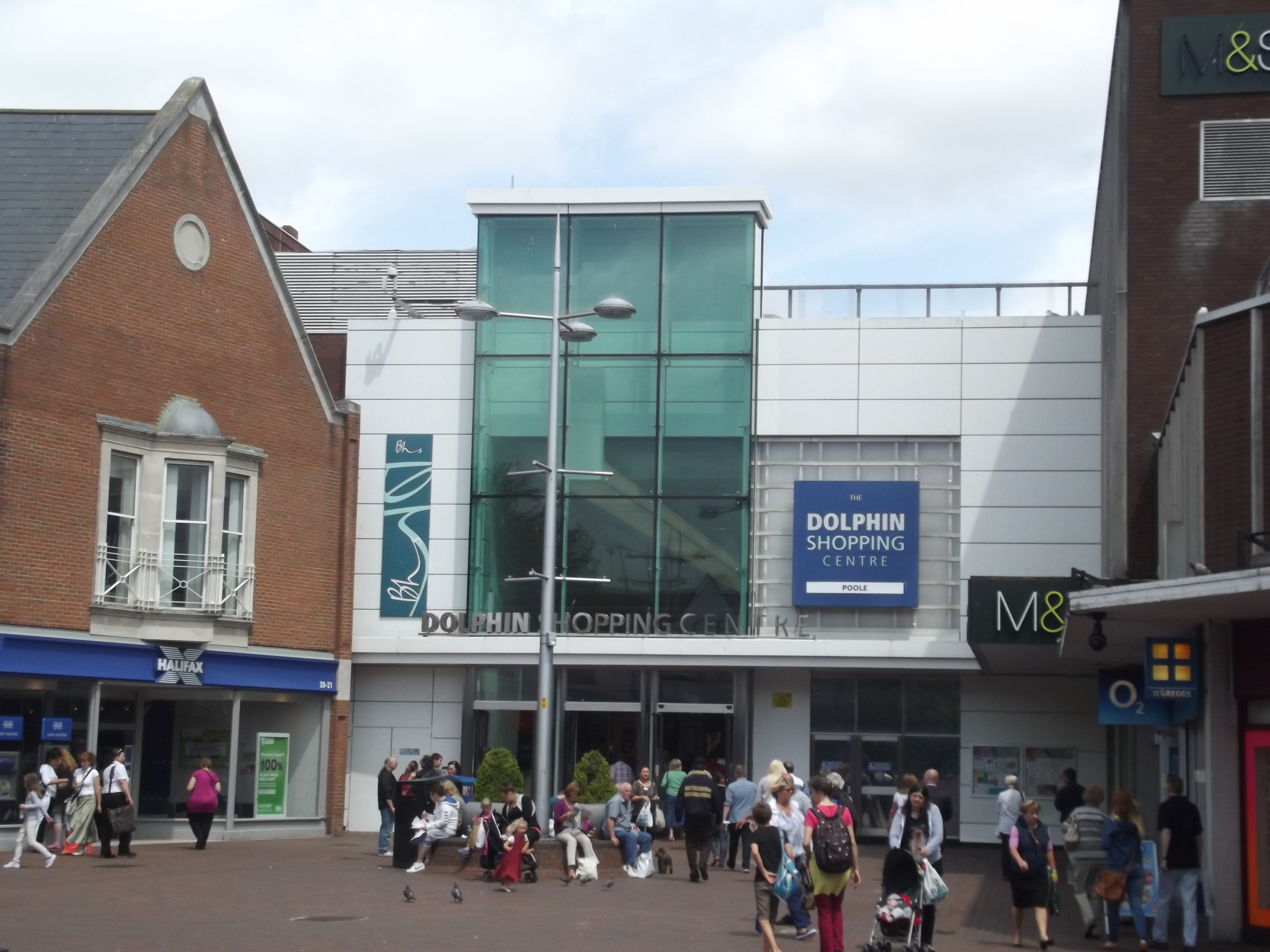
- Location: Poole, England
- Coordinates: 50.71834°N 1.9805°W
- Opened: 1969
- Developer: Arndale Property Trust
- Owner: Legal & General
- Floors: 3
- Website: http://www.dolphinshoppingcentre.co.uk/

The Dolphin Shopping Centre is a shopping centre in Poole, Dorset, England, formerly known as the Arndale Centre.

The shopping centre adjoins Poole Bus Station.

== History and development ==
In 1957 discussions began about creating a covered in shopping centre in the heart of Poole town centre, in a similar vein to those popular at the time in America. In 1963 property developers were invited by Poole Corporation to present schemes to develop this shopping centre as part of a redevelopment of the town.

The winning scheme was for a £2 million redevelopment by the Arndale Property Trust on land at High Street, Seldown Lane and Kingland Road known as the Ladies Walking Field. One of the main reasons Arndale won was that their proposal incorporated a fully enclosed shopping centre. The scheme was to be designed by Leslie Jones and Partners in association with Geoffrey Hopkinson; Poole Borough Architect and Chief Planning Officer, the structural engineers were to be Bowden Sillett and Partners and the main contractors were to be Sir Lindsay Parkinson and Company.

The transformation of Poole Town Centre started in June 1966 when work began on a new road layout and construction of the shopping centre commenced in March 1967 when the then Mayor of Poole, Alderman Ron Hart, dug the first turf.

=== Phase One ===
Phase One of the centre was opened at 10:30am on 1 July 1969 by the Mayor of Poole, Alderman Lloyd-Allen and was an American style mall which included 93 retail units, offices, a sports centre, bus terminus and a library. The cost had risen to £3m, but with 200,000 shoppers a week passing through the centre, it was deemed so successful that plans for a second phase were unveiled at the centre's first birthday party.

A much loved feature of phase one were a series of mahogany animals, designed as 'play sculptures' for children. There were four sculptures originally: a hippo, a turtle, a whale and a snake, and they were created by local artist Peter Hand. Hand received the commission for the play sculptures while working in part-time teaching post in the Sculpture Department at a local arts college and they were the first of many commissions for similar shopping centres across the UK.

=== Phase Two ===
Phase Two of the centre started in 1980 and the Arndale Centre grew to its final size with the approval of Phase Two B after a Public Inquiry in January 1982. This was topped out in March 1984 in a ceremony involving the Mayor, Cllr Roger Buss and Mr Ron Jennings, the deputy chairman of the development company; Town and City Properties (who by this time had absorbed Arndale Property Trust). A time capsule containing coins, documents and a copy of the Daily Telegraph was buried under the concrete at the highest point of the development.

=== Dolphin Shopping Centre ===
In 1989 an £8 million refurbishment programme was carried out on the centre, which emerged with a new name; The Dolphin Shopping Centre. The three remaining wooden ‘play sculptures’ (the hippo, the turtle and the whale) were removed in 1997 (the snake had been removed some years earlier before being stored in an open area in one of the service areas of the centre and later removed as rubbish).

The centre was acquired in 2003 by Grosvenor Group, who sold it to Dutch property investment company; Wereldhave in December 2010 for £85 million. It was then later sold to Legal & General in 2013 for £58 million.

In 2004, as the centre became increasingly popular, a further multimillion-pound refurbishment programme was completed. The centre entrances were redeveloped, access for shoppers with disabilities was enhanced, and the interior was given a facelift for the first time since 1989.

Poole Sports Centre closed just before Christmas 2007 when operator UK Sports Centres LTD went into liquidation and the space was marketing by agents Sibbett Gregory for disposal.

In May 2008, after an absence of eleven years, the 'play sculptures' returned to the centre and were displayed in rotation as part of specially designed enclosure, where they collected funds for local charities. In 2013 it was rumoured that the 'play sculptures' could be returned to the centre on a full-time basis, and that children might once again be allowed to play on them.

The Marks & Spencers store, which opened in 1971, closed for the final time on 8 January 2022. In December 2023, Wenzel's bakery opened their first store in Dorset in the shopping centre.

In February 2025, reinforced autoclaved aerated concrete (RAAC) was found at the shopping centre. The final Beales department store in the UK will close at the end of May 2025.

== Stores ==
- The Body Shop
- Boots
- Card Factory
- Claire's
- Clarks
- Clintons
- Deichmann
- Ernest Jones
- JD Sports
- New Look
- Next
- H&M
- H. Samuel
- Hays Travel
- HMV
- Pandora
- Primark
- The Perfume Shop
- River Island
- Smiggle
- Sports Direct
- Timpson
- Toytown
- Vision Express
- Wilko

=== Food and Drink Stores ===
- Holland & Barrett
- Kaspa's
- KFC
- Muffin Break
- Subway
- Starbucks

== Health village ==
In December 2021, University Hospitals Dorset opened a "health village" in the shopping centre, which is located on the top floor of the Beales department store. The clinic mainly serves the purpose of triaging patients waiting for their first secondary care appointment and is currently used by the following specialties: Ophthalmology, Breast Screening, Dermatology and Orthopaedics. However, the trust are planning to attract more specialties to the health village.

== Former Stores ==
- Accessorize (moved to Poole High Street, now closed)
- Beales
- Birthdays
- BHS
- Burton
- The Discovery Store
- Dorothy Perkins
- Early Learning Centre
- Eurochange
- Evans
- Hawkin's Bazaar
- Jessops
- JJB Sports
- The Link
- Littlewoods
- O2 Store (now in Poole High Street)
- Post Office (now in WHSmith)
- Silverscreen
- Topshop
- Toymaster

=== Former Food and Drink Stores ===
- Druckers Vienna Patisserie
- Greggs (now in Poole High Street)
- Julian Graves
- Marks & Spencer
- Tchibo
- Thorntons

== Poole bus station ==
Poole bus station is a municipal building in Poole Town Centre, England. The bus station has been described as being an example of brutalist architecture.

Poole bus station
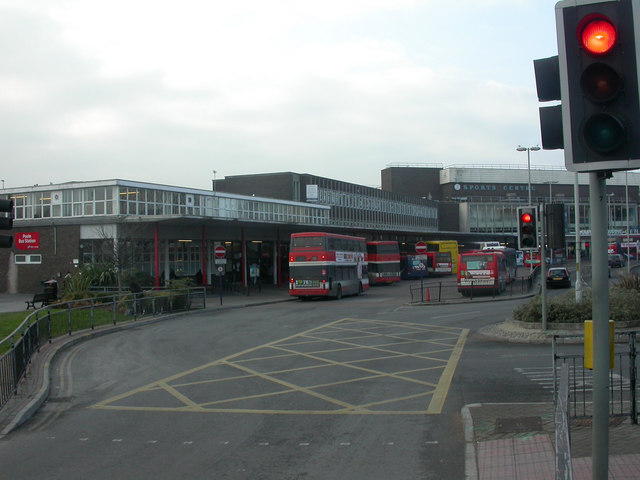
- The bus station in 2009

General information
- Location: Poole; England
- Owner: Wilts & Dorset
- Bus stands: 15
- Bus operators: National Express; Morebus
Location

The bus station adjoins the Dolphin Shopping Centre and is opposite the Lighthouse Theatre. Poole bus station is the largest bus station in Dorset and is a key travel hub on the South Coast of England. The station is owned partially by Wilts & Dorset, and partially by Bournemouth, Christchurch and Poole Council. It is used by National Express.

The bus station is notorious for its lack of tidiness and anti-social behaviour and has been identified as a crime hotspot by Dorset Police.

=== History ===
A bus station has been on the site since at least the 1960s.

The bus station was redeveloped in 2009 with improved lighting and new kerbs, and with the UK's largest outdoor mural being painted onto the ceiling by Penson Architects. The process cost £300,000 and was supported by the Dolphin Shopping Centre and Poole Borough Council. The mural graphic contains over 500 panels over 1000 square metres. The revamp was officially opened by town mayor Joyce Lavender.

In 2017, the bus station was severely flooded. Also in 2017, a £134 million revamp of Poole Town Centre, including the bus station was unveiled.

In 2018, the bus station was attacked by youths and damage was caused to lights and windows. In 2019, a further redevelopment plan for a new bus station was revealed.

In 2020, Yellow Buses stopped using the bus station due to the anti-social behaviour in the area. As a result, Bournemouth, Christchurch and Poole Council boarded up the nearby alleyways to discourage crime. In 2021 there was a proposal to permanently close the alleyways.

The travel shop was closed during the first half of 2020 due to the COVID-19 pandemic.

=== Further reading ===
- Poole Bus Station in the 1980s and 1990s
