= Economy of Dorset =

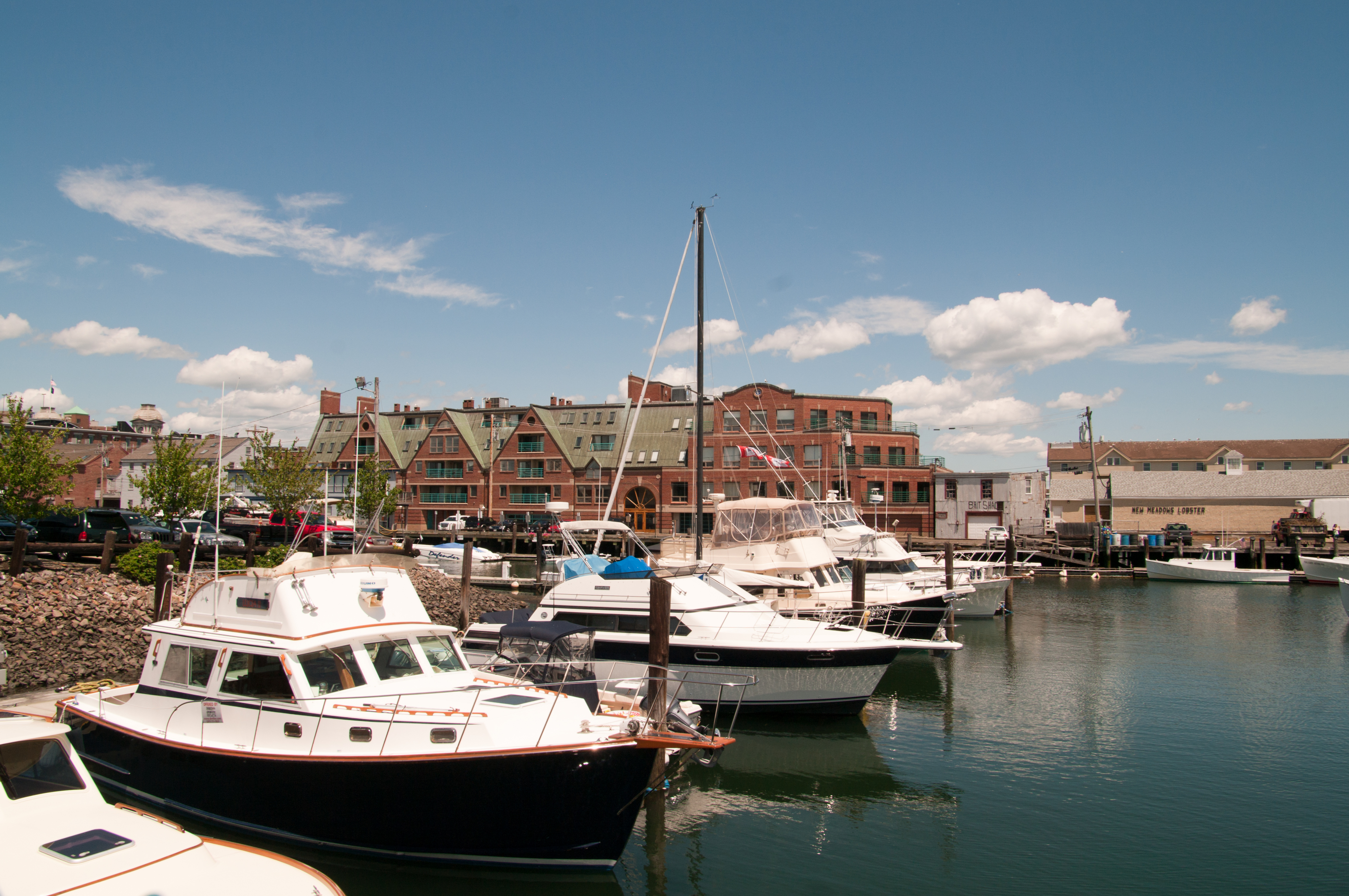
- Boats at Portland Harbour

Statistics
- Population: 384,809 (2023)
- GDP: £11.4 billion (2023)
- GDP per capita: £29,573 (2023)

The economy of the County of Dorset in South West England was worth £16.189 billion to the UK economy in 2013.

== History ==
Historically, agriculture has dominated the Dorset economy, but over time it has decreased in importance. Dorset was the birthplace of the trade union movement, with the Tolpuddle Martyrs hailing from the county.

Being a coastal county, smuggling has been a dominant part of the Dorset economy with the Battle of Mudeford being fought in 1784 at Mudeford Quay, Mudeford, Christchurch. Fleet and Kinson were also home to smugglers.

The COVID-19 pandemic in the United Kingdom has damaged the economy heavily.

== Corporate economy ==
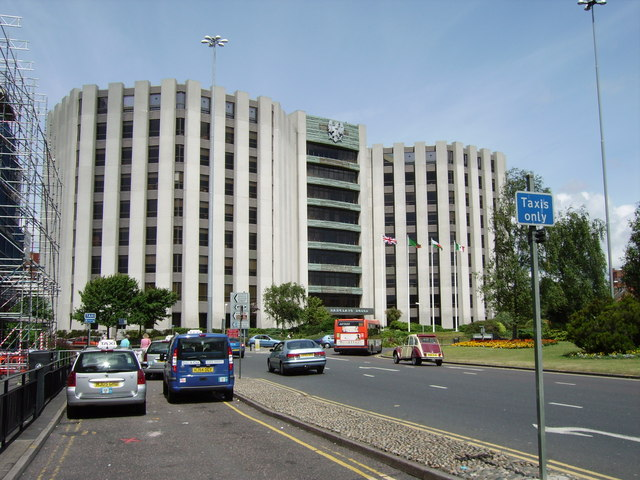
Barclays in Poole Town Centre

Barclays Bank once had a regional headquarters in Poole Town Centre. Merlin Entertainments is also based in Poole.

== Defence industry ==
Dorset is home to a number of Ministry of Defence facilities that employ many people; RM Poole, Lulworth Ranges, Bovington Camp and the Wyke Regis Training Area.

== Digital economy ==
Redweb, a leading firm in the digital and creative industry of Dorset was liquidated in December 2021.

== Environment ==
In 2015, Dorset County Council reported that the environmental economy was worth between £0.9 billion and £2.5 billion per annum; and supports between 17,000 and 61,000 jobs.

== Manufacturing ==
Factories in Dorset include those at Ryvita and Sunseeker.

== Maritime industry ==
The maritime transport industry of Dorset is based at the Port of Poole in Poole and the Portland Harbour at the Isle of Portland.

== Media ==
Dorset is home to newspapers; Dorset Echo and the Bournemouth Daily Echo.

== Retail ==
Dorset is the headquarters for a number of retail companies. The cosmetics company Lush was founded and is headquartered in Poole.

Hobbycraft has headquarters in Christchurch and New Look has corporate headquarters in Weymouth.

Dolphin Shopping Centre in Poole is the largest indoor shopping centre in Dorset.

== Science and Technology ==
The Dorset Green Technology Park employs many people.

HeliOperations is based on the Isle of Portland.

== Tourism ==
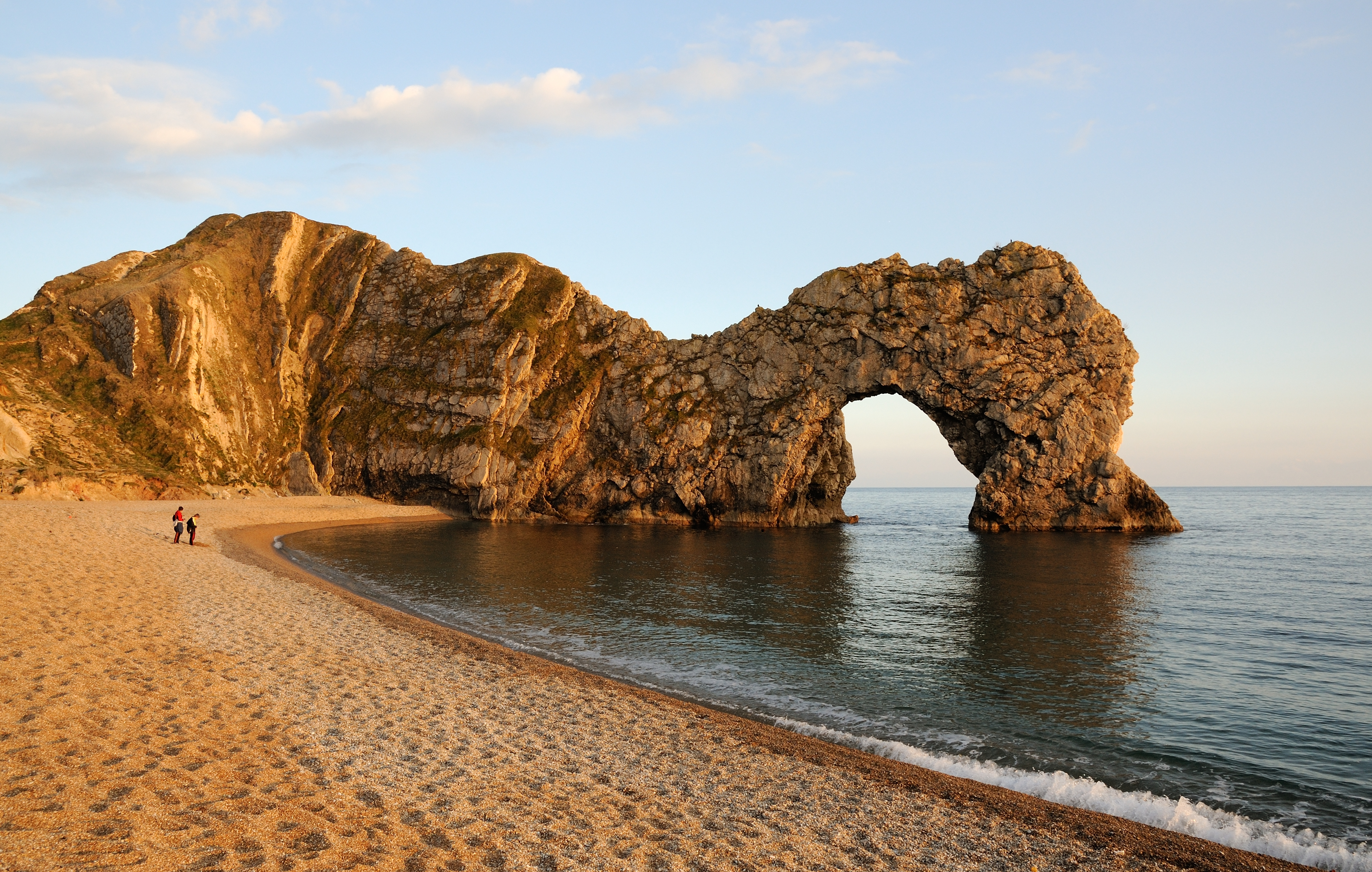
The prehistoric Durdle Door

Tourism in Dorset is valued at £1bn a year 40,000 people are employed in the industry.

== See also ==
- List of ceremonial counties in England by gross value added
