= Wyo =

Wyo or WYO may refer to:

- Wyoming, a state in USA
- Wyo, California, a community in Glenn County, California
- Wessex Youth Orchestra, an orchestra in Poole, England
- Williamsburg Youth Orchestra, an orchestra in Williamsburg, Virginia
- World Youth Organization, a non-profit organization in Chennai, India
- WYO, a candidate phylum of bacteria
- José Miguel Monzón a.k.a. El Gran Wyoming, a Spanish humorist
