= Don Lewin =

British businessman (1933–2024)

Donald John Lewin (11 June 1933 – 25 October 2024) was a British businessman. He was the founder and former chairman of Clinton Cards, a chain of greeting cards shops in the United Kingdom. He and his family were estimated to be worth £139 million in 2008.

== Biography ==
Lewin was born on 11 June 1933 in Bow, London, the son of a chimney sweep. After leaving school at the age of 15, he worked for a building firm, did two years of National Service, sold brushes from door to door, sold credit and, when he was 26, got a job as a freelance salesman selling greeting cards to retailers.

In 1968, he opened a specialist greeting card shop in Epping, Essex, and created the company Clinton Cards, named after his son, Clinton. He opened a chain of seven shops, five of which he then sold to reinvest in larger shops in better locations. By 1988, he had created a chain of 87 shops and floated the company on the stock exchange for a valuation of £20 million, retaining 50 per cent of the shares and using money raised to acquire rival greeting cards chains.

By 2004, the company had 800 shops in the United Kingdom and Ireland, was valued at £180 million on the London Stock Exchange and had sales of £360 million. The family stake in the business, share sales and other assets were estimated to be worth £139 million in 2008. In 2012, the business had 767 shops and employed 8,000 people but went into administration later that year. Lewin was made an OBE in 1996 and his autobiography, Think of a Card, was published in 2008. He died on 25 October 2024, at the age of 91.
