= Me to You Bears =

Collection of teddy bears

Me to You Bears (also known as Tatty Teddies) is the brand name of a collection of teddy bears made by greeting cards company Carte Blanche Greetings Ltd. They are often sold in Clinton Cards stores. They were first created in 1987 and appeared in their current guise in 1995. A number of products are available related to Tatty Teddy, including plush toys, figurines, greeting cards, mugs, clothing and wedding accessories.

== Origin ==
The beginnings of Me to You started in 1987 when Carte Blanche Greetings chairman and founder, Stephen Haines, approached Mike Payne to create a group of 'cute' characters to appear on a series of greeting cards. This led to the creation of various cartoon animals called the Miranda gang, which notably included a brown bear with patches.

Deciding it was time for a refresh, in 1995, Carte Blanche gave the bear a new look. Drawn in charcoal pencil turning the bear's fur from brown to grey, and with the addition of a bright blue nose, a few more patches and a backstory of his very own, 'Tatty Teddy' and 'Me to You' were born.

Me to You is now a global brand and Tatty Teddy now appears on a wide range of Me to You products including greeting cards, plush toys, clothing, gifts, figurines, personalised products and confectionery. Over 75 million Me to You plush bears have been sold since 2000.

== Availability ==
Me to You Bears was initially available in the UK, but as of December 2011, the Douglas Company received a license to sell the brand in the US and Canada.

== Appearance ==
The first generation of Tatty Teddy soft toys, produced in 2000, was based on the original greeting card design of 1995 consisting of a teddy bear with short grey fur, small black eyes, an off-white snout and a blue nose with a white reflective spot on the right hand side. They also have patches of a light grey colour which appear to have been sewn onto them, along with stitching repair work on the arms and head, hence the name 'tatty'. The words 'Me to You' are embroidered on the right rear paw. The first Tatty Teddy was hand crafted by Linda Laverty of Worthing, West Sussex. The second generation Tatty Teddy, introduced in 2003, kept to the same overall design but with much finer fur. To coincide with the 2003 redesign, the 'Me to You' story was also published, describing how the teddy bear came to be in its current state. A third generation Tatty Teddy was introduced in May 2009. This bear has much longer fur in various shades of grey and a blue plastic nose, rather than the fabric nose on previous generations. The reflective spot has been removed since the new plastic nose has reflective qualities.

The bears come in many different sizes, ranging from 5 cm to in excess of 80 cm, and often come with accessories such as hearts, roses, t-shirts, wooly hats and scarves. Some have personalised messages from a simple "I Love You", to longer seasonal and event related messages. It is even possible for customers to personalise their bears. The bears are particularly popular amongst females in the 10–30 age group although they are also designed to be romantic gifts for people of all ages as they can be considered 'cute'. Due to this they are becoming collector's items, similar to Steiff and Beanie Babies toys. Indeed, there are even annual Tatty Teddy national collectors events.

Several special edition and limited edition bears have also been produced, enhancing the collectible nature of the toys, which see the bear dressed in different costumes including various animals and the four seasons (summer, winter etc.). Many of the limited and special edition releases are designed to tie in with events such as Valentine's Day, Mother's Day and Christmas. The number of these limited edition bears produced is usually 9000, but this can range from 1500 to in excess of 10,000.

Regional variations of Tatty Teddy are also available, for example Scottish dress and London Beefeater. Versions of Tatty Teddy have also been made for the tourist market, usually wearing a T-shirt with an expressive message, for example 'I Love Cornwall'.

The makers of the teddies do not recommend that they are cleaned in washing machines but instead should be hand washed. This is because the dye in the clothes of the bears has not been tested to see if they are colorfast.

== My Blue Nose Friends: Series 1 ==
In the summer of 2008, "My Blue Nose Friends" were released – other animal toys in the same style as Tatty Teddy. The story given is that Tatty Teddy was lonely and dreamt of a wardrobe full of friends.

=== 2008 ===
Set 1 – June 2008

- 1 Patch the Dog
- 2 Kittywink the Cat
- 3 Blossom the Rabbit
- 4 Dilly the Duck
- 5 Toots the Elephant
- 6 Binky the Panda

Set 2 – August 2008

- 7 Twiggy the Giraffe
- 8 Chip the Zebra
- 9 Rocky the Lion
- 10 Buster the Leopard

Set 3 – October 2008

- 11 Truffles the Pig
- 12 Cottonsocks the Sheep
- 13 Coco the Monkey
- 14 Konker the Hedgehog

Set 4 – December 2008

- 15 Chalky the Polar Bear
- 16 Wise the Owl
- 17 Chilly the Penguin
- 18 Jingle the Reindeer

=== 2009 ===
Set 5 – January 2009

- 19 Mo the Kangaroo
- 20 Gumgum the Koala
- 21 Milkshake the Cow
- 22 Bobbin the Horse

Set 6 – May 2009

- 23 Thomas the Hippopotamus
- 24 Digger the Terrier
- 25 Bracken the Badger
- 26 Dot the Ladybird

Limited Edition 1 – June 2009

- 27 Breeze the Butterfly

Set 7 – August 2009

- 28 Honey the Bee
- 29 Splodge the Dalmatian
- 30 Shelley the Turtle
- 31 Lily the Frog

Limited Edition 2 – September 2009

- 32 Echo the Bat

Set 8 – November 2009

- 33 Bells the Reindeer
- 34 Sugarcube the Donkey
- 35 Tiny the Mouse
- 36 Jock the Moose

Limited Edition 3 – December 2009

- 37 Ruby the Robin

=== 2010 ===
Set 9 – January 2010

- 38 Peanuts the Hamster
- 39 Pearl the Poodle
- 40 Fluffy the Old English Sheepdog
- 41 Snuffle the Anteater
- 42 Melody the Parrot
- 43 Snowdrop the White Rabbit

Limited Edition 4 – January 2010

- 44 Legend the Unicorn

Set 10 – March 2010

- 45 Scoot the Snail
- 46 Mack the Otter
- 47 Zee Zee the Goat
- 48 Wrinkles the Boxer Dog
- 49 Cuddles the Sun Bear

Set 11 – June 2010

- 50 Giggles the Baboon
- 51 Goldie the Golden Labrador
- 52 Webster the Spider
- 53 Sue-Shee the Pelican

Limited Edition 5 – July 2010

- 54 Stilts the Flamingo

Set 12 – August 2010

- 55 Whisper the Deer
- 56 Blubber the Walrus
- 57 Jungle the Orangutan
- 58 Essence the Skunk

Set 13 – November 2010

- 59 Wanda the Goose
- 60 Alaska the Husky
- 61 Whiskers the Seal
- 62 Kozie the Alpaca

Limited Edition 6 – Christmas 2010

- 63 Cranberry the Turkey

=== 2011 ===
Set 14 – January 2011

- 64 Trotters the Wild Boar
- 65 Cheddar the Field Mouse
- 66 Rainbow the Puffin
- 67 Kashmir the Ram

Limited Edition 7 – Valentine's Day 2011

- 68 Passion the Love Bug

Set 15 – March 2011

- 69 Splash the Octopus
- 70 Peek-a-boo the Mole
- 71 Chase the Jack Russell Terrier
- 72 Midnight the Owl

Limited Edition 8 – June 2011

- 73 Tango the Toucan

Set 16 – June 2011

- 74 Oasis the Camel
- 75 Gossip the Lizard
- 76 Snugs the Chinchilla
- 77 Peers the Meerkat

Set 17 – August 2011

- 78 Baffle the Fox
- 79 Noo the Wildebeest
- 80 Scuba the Dolphin
- 81 Ivory the Rhinoceros

Limited Edition 9 – September 2011

- 82 Flame the Dragon

Set 18 – November 2011

- 83 Needles the Woolly Mammoth
- 84 Quiver the Emperor Penguin
- 85 Bengal the White Tiger
- 86 Alpine the Bernese Mountain Dog

Limited Edition 10 – November 2011

- 87 Feathers the Peacock

=== 2012 ===
Set 19 – January 2012

- 88 Nutmeg the Squirrel
- 89 Buck the Beaver
- 90 Yabber the Platypus
- 91 Koodoo the Antelope

Limited Edition 11 – January 2012

- 92 Ripple the Swan

Set 20 – March 2012

- 93 Scraps the Rat
- 94 Runner the Ostrich
- 95 Foo the Pug
- 96 Float the Manatee

Limited Edition 12 – April 2012

- 97 Tropic the Seahorse

Set 21 – May 2012

- 98 Treetops the Gorilla
- 99 Ocean the Sea Turtle
- 100 Ramble the Centipede
- 101 Shelter the Woodlouse
- 102 Jewel the Corgi

Set 22 – August 2012

- 103 Shield the Armadillo
- 104 Squabble the Pigeon
- 105 Paws the Persian Cat
- 106 Pipsqueak the Chihuahua

Limited Edition 13 – November 2012

- 107 Culture the Chameleon

=== 2013 ===
Set 23 – April 2013

- 108 Smoo the Highland Cow
- 109 Comedy the Hyena
- 110 Spirit the Lemur
- 111 Twist the Snake

Set 24 – June 2013

- 112 Scuttle the Crab
- 113 Bixie the Cocker Spaniel
- 114 Flip the Gecko
- 115 Spangle the Starfish

Set 25 – September 2013

- 116 Glide the Pegasus
- 117 Crest the Pterosaur
- 118 Pout the Pufferfish
- 119 Abbey the British Cat

Set 26 – November 2013

- 120 Ziza the African elephant
- 121 Flash the Dragon
- 122 Tinsel the Arctic fox
- 123 Avery the Chick

Set 27 – December 2013

- 124 Aimee the Love Bird
- 125 Pudge the Triceratops
- 126 Leboo the Masai Lion
- 127 Deelish the Wombat

=== 2014 ===
Set 28 – March 2014

- 128 Eduardo the Axolotl
- 129 Frizzie the Lamb
- 130 Dash the Cheetah
- 131 Diva the Canary

Set 29 – May 2014

- 132 Pandora the Oyster
- 133 Tatty Puppy
- 134 Denzil the Komodo Dragon
- 135 Soprano the Shetland Pony

Set 30 – September 2014

- 136 Nelson the Narwhal
- 137 Spartacus the Labradoodle
- 138 China the Red Panda
- 139 Sahara the Scorpion

Set 31 – November 2014

- 140 Scamp the Gerbil
- 141 Hugo the Killer Whale
- 142 Sasha the Silk Moth
- 143 Blanche the Stoat

=== 2015 ===
Set 32 – January 2015

- 144 Tica the Tree Frog
- 145 Roger the Raccoon
- 146 Snoozi the Sloth
- 147 Stephen the Seagull

Set 33 – March 2015

- 148 Sebastian the Sabre Tooth Tiger
- 149 Rascal the Schnauzer
- 150 Twinkletoes the Floppy-Eared Rabbit
- 151 Pippa the Chipmunk

Set 34 – June 2015

- 152 Spike the Crocodile
- 153 Bobbi the German Shepherd
- 154 Perky the Pangolin
- 155 Claudia the Siamese Cat

Set 35 – September 2015

- 156 Chuck the Honey Badger
- 157 Pizazz the Appaloosa Horse
- 158 Tallulah the King Charles Spaniel
- 159 Ceecee the Shrimp

Set 36 – November 2015

- 160 Sandy the Hermit Crab
- 161 Fudge the Guinea Pig
- 162 Dougie the Markhor
- 163 Betsey the Basset Hound

=== 2016 ===
Set 37 – January 2016

- 164 Bubbles the Manta Ray
- 165 Felix the Ferret
- 166 Dolly the Staffordshire Bull Terrier
- 167 Erza the Llama

Set 38 – March 2016

- 168 Doris the Slow Loris
- 169 George the Silver Fox
- 170 Cluck the Chicken
- 171 Rollo the Sugar Glider

Set 39 – June 2016

- 172 Zippy the Road Runner
- 173 Synthia the Python
- 174 Bruce the Gayal
- 175 Zzzabella the Queen Bee

Set 40 – September 2016

- 177 Holly the Magpie
- 177 Snowball the Lion-haired Rabbit
- 178 Jack the Yak
- 179 Trixie the Shih Tzu

Set 41 – November 2016

- 180 Reggie the Rooster
- 181 Winston the British Bulldog
- 182 Willow the Wallaby
- 183 Annie the Aardvark

== My Blue Nose Friends: Series 2 ==
Seven new My Blue Nose Friends toys were released in September 2019. These included revamped versions of Toots, Konker, Legend, Blossom, Tiny, Milkshake and Twiggy.

=== 2020 ===
Set 1

- 1 Aurora the Caticorn (Cat/Unicorn hybrid)
- 2 Rezi the Raccoon
- 3 Blossom the Rabbit
- 4 Otto the Octopus
- 5 Toots the Elephant
- 6 Lightning the Sloth
- 7 Twiggy the Giraffe
- 8 Nala the Narwhal
- 9 Rufus the Dog
- 14 Konker the Hedgehog
- 17 Jester the Monkey
- 21 Milkshake the Cow
- 35 Tiny the Mouse
- 44 Legend the Unicorn

=== 2024 ===
Set 2

- 1 Queenie the Corgi
- 2 Casey the Dalmatian
- 3 Zig Zag the Zebra
- 4 Bray the Donkey
- 5 Maverick the Goat
- 6 Fizzy the Bee
- 7 Bolt the Squirrel
- 8 Karma the Llama
- 9 Blush the Flamingo
- 10 Denny the Fox
- 11 Splash the Elephant
- 12 Sonny the Sloth
- 13 Spirit the Cat
- 14 Cotton Tail the Bunny
- 15 Spike the Hedgehog
- 16 Snooks the Panda
- 17 Jester the Monkey
- 18 Skye the Giraffe
- 19 Abra the Unicorn
- 20 Chill the Triceratops
- 21 North the Husky
- 22 Rufus the Reindeer
- 23 Salty the Polar Bear
- 24 Cuddles the Penguin
- 25 Rosie the Robin
- 26 Dexter the Dachshund
- 27 Cosmos the Owl
- 28 McDuff the Highland Cow
- 29 Ruby the Ladybug (a.k.a. Ladybird)
- 30 Quackers the Duck
- 31 Cracker Jack the Mouse
- 32 Ember the Red Panda
- 33 Flit the Bat
- 34 Dancer the Shetland Pony
- 35 Blizzard the Snow Leopard
- 36 Gobbledygook the Turkey
- 37 Snowball the Arctic Hare
- 38 Verity the Labrador
- 39 Mary the Lamb
- 40 Leonardo the Lion
- 41 Clawdia the Lobster
- 42 Tumble the Brown Bear
- 43 Tickles the T-Rex
- 44 Sway the Fawn
- 45 Rosa the Poodle
- 46 Nibbles the Chipmunk
- 47 Flip the Frog
- 48 Otto the Otter
- 49 Nugget the Chicken
- 50 Boo the Cockapoo
- 51 Pigasso the Pig
- 52 Harmony the Turtle Dove
- 53 Gurty the Guinea Pig
- 54 Digby the Badger
- 55 Maple the Moose
- 56 Spinderella the Spider
- 57 Darwin the Orangutan
- 58 Scout the Meerkat
- 59 Buddy the Collie
- 60 Bubbles the Axolotl
- 61 Squish the Rhino
- 62 Minty the Shark
- 63 Stella the Starfish
- 64 Serena the Seahorse
- 65 Houdini the Octopus
- 66 Shelby the Turtle

== Luna the Wolf ==
To celebrate the launch of their 100th My Blue Nose Friends character, Ramble the Centipede, Carte Blanche launched a free-to-enter competition in June 2012. 100 fans had the chance to win a rare and exclusive 4" My Blue Nose Friends character, Luna the Wolf. The character is not available to buy anywhere in the world.
