= 1988 Poole explosion =

Large fire and explosion in Poole, England

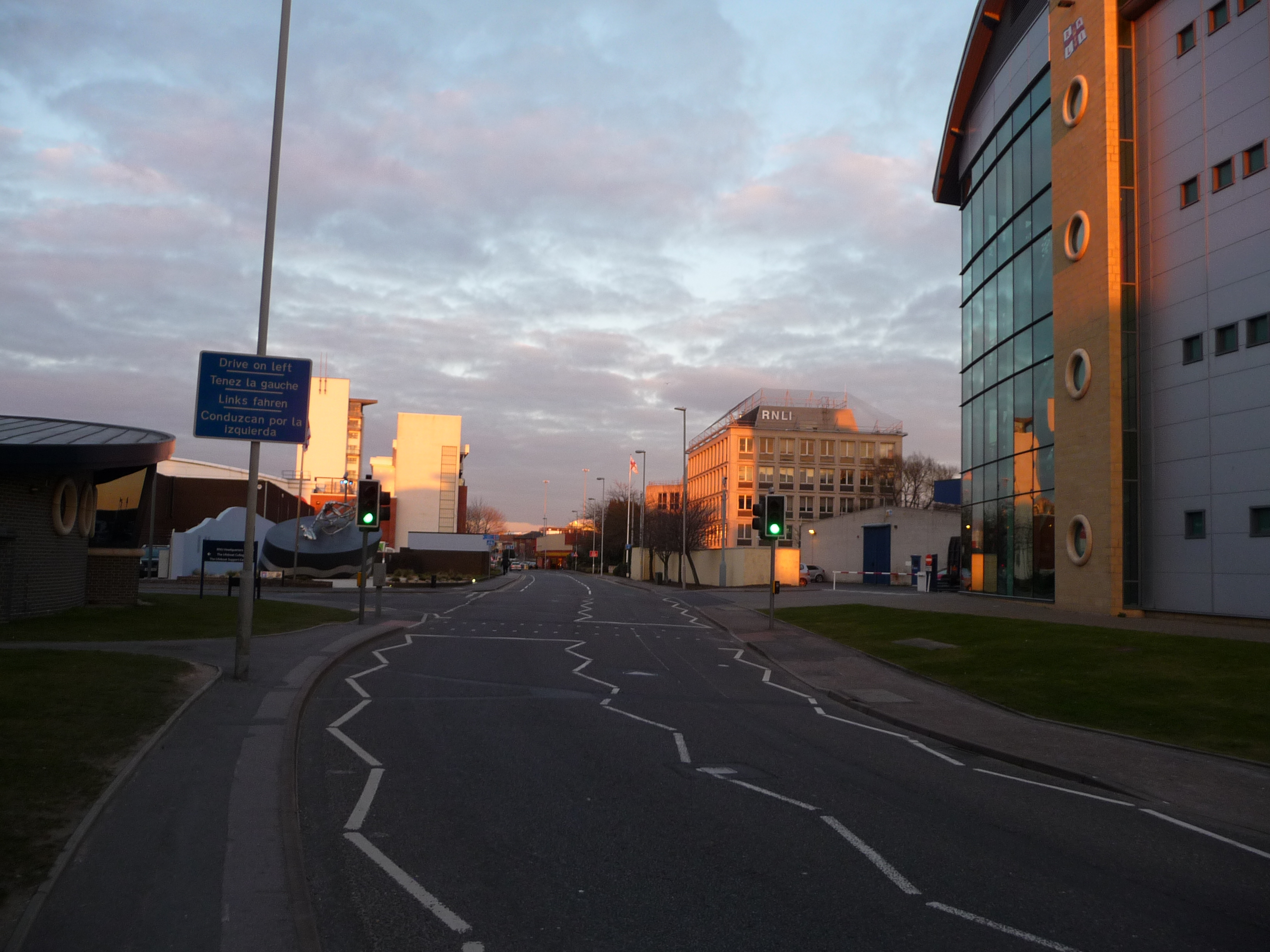
- The RNLI building on West Quay Road on the right stands where the factory once stood.
- Date: 21 June 1988
- Time: c. 18:30 GMT (UTC±0)
- Location: West Quay Road, Poole, Dorset, England; 50°42′59.7″N 1°59′19.2″W
- Type: Chemical Explosion
- Deaths: 0
- Injuries: 14

On 21 June 1988, a large fire and explosion engulfed the BDH chemical plant in Poole, Dorset, England. 3,500 people were evacuated from the town centre in the biggest peacetime evacuation in the UK since World War II. Despite the intensity of the explosion, nobody was killed or seriously injured.

== Background ==
British Drug Houses (BDH) had operated in Poole for 40 years. The plant at West Quay Road was constructed in 1982.

== Events ==
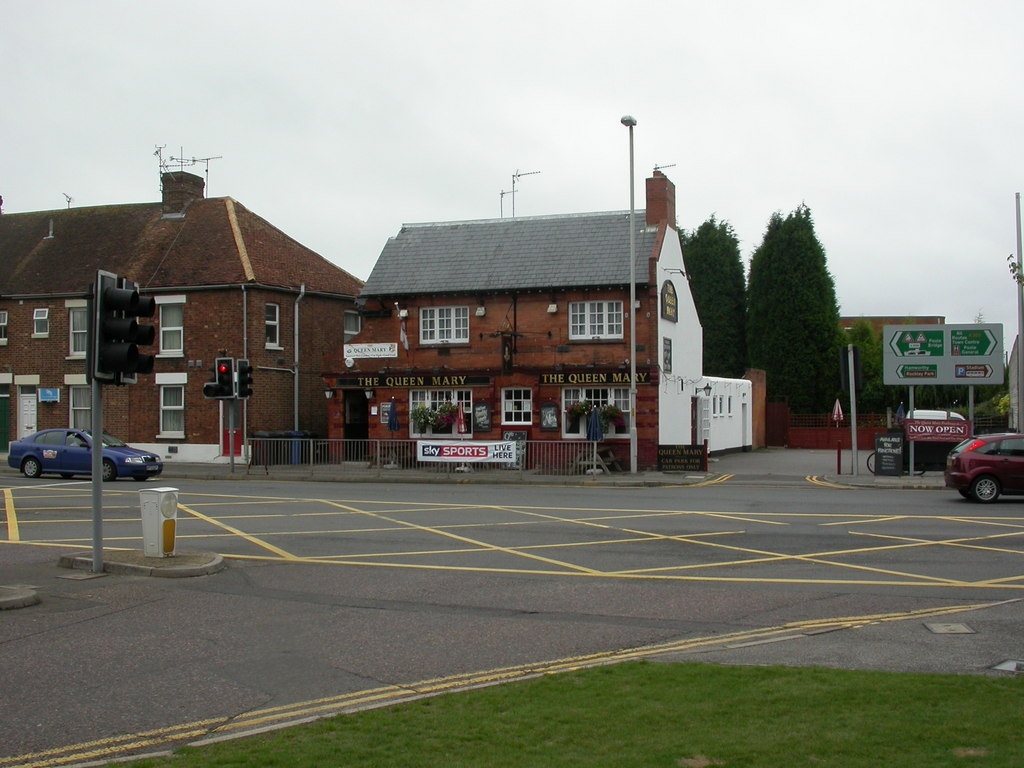
The Queen Mary Pub on West Street neighboured the factory and survived but did sustain heavy fire damage.

At about 7:30 pm, emergency services were called to a fire at an industrial unit on West Quay Road in Poole. The warehouse was operated by BDH and stood adjacent to the Port of Poole, and close to residential and commercial areas in Old Poole. The fire was discovered in an oxidising storeroom, and it had spread to the adjacent area containing flammable liquids.

There were flames up to 100 ft (30 m) high and flaming drums full of liquids were sent into the air and rained down on neighbouring streets. Missiles from the fire spread 50 m (150 ft), and there was off-site damage to 100 m (350 ft) away. A fireball was witnessed and a plume of yellow-brown smoke was seen rising over Poole Old Town.

An evacuation began at 7:45 pm, affecting a 1 square mile (2.6 km^{2}) radius in Poole Town Centre. Nearby tower blocks were emptied, and terraced streets were searched. People were sent to the Arts Centre, Sports Centre and the Arndale Centre (now Dolphin Shopping Centre). The evacuation was organised by Station Manager Gordon Hughes. In November 1988, he became only the second recipient of the Chief Officer's Commendation. 100 firefighters attended the scene.

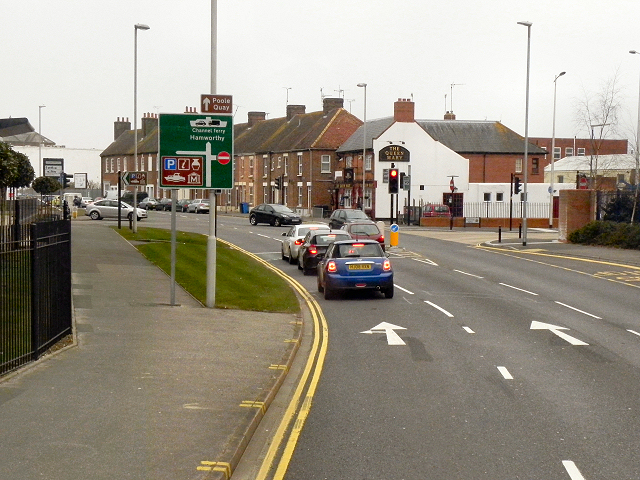
West Street ran to the rear of the plant

Fourteen people were taken to Poole General Hospital. Local residents were not allowed to return to their homes until 5:30 am the next day. The Health and Safety Executive, on the scene that morning, said the devastation would make an investigation of the cause virtually impossible. Street furniture and traffic lights had melted and windows were smashed. The smoke was analysed to have contained hydrogen chloride. Pollution of watercourses, including Poole Harbour, was also of concern. Authorities said that luck had kept the injuries minor, as barrels containing cyanide did not explode and the wind blew the toxic smoke offshore.

== Investigation ==
Member of Parliament for Poole, John Ward asked the Parliamentary Under-Secretary of State for Employment, Patrick Nicholls, to set up a public inquiry into the incident. The minister confirmed that the Health and Safety Executive would carry out a full investigation into the cause of the fire. The results of the investigation were published and publicised at a press conference held on 17 October 1988. The minister also confirmed that the BDH facilities at West Quay Road had been inspected 15 times between 1979 and 1988.

== Legacy ==
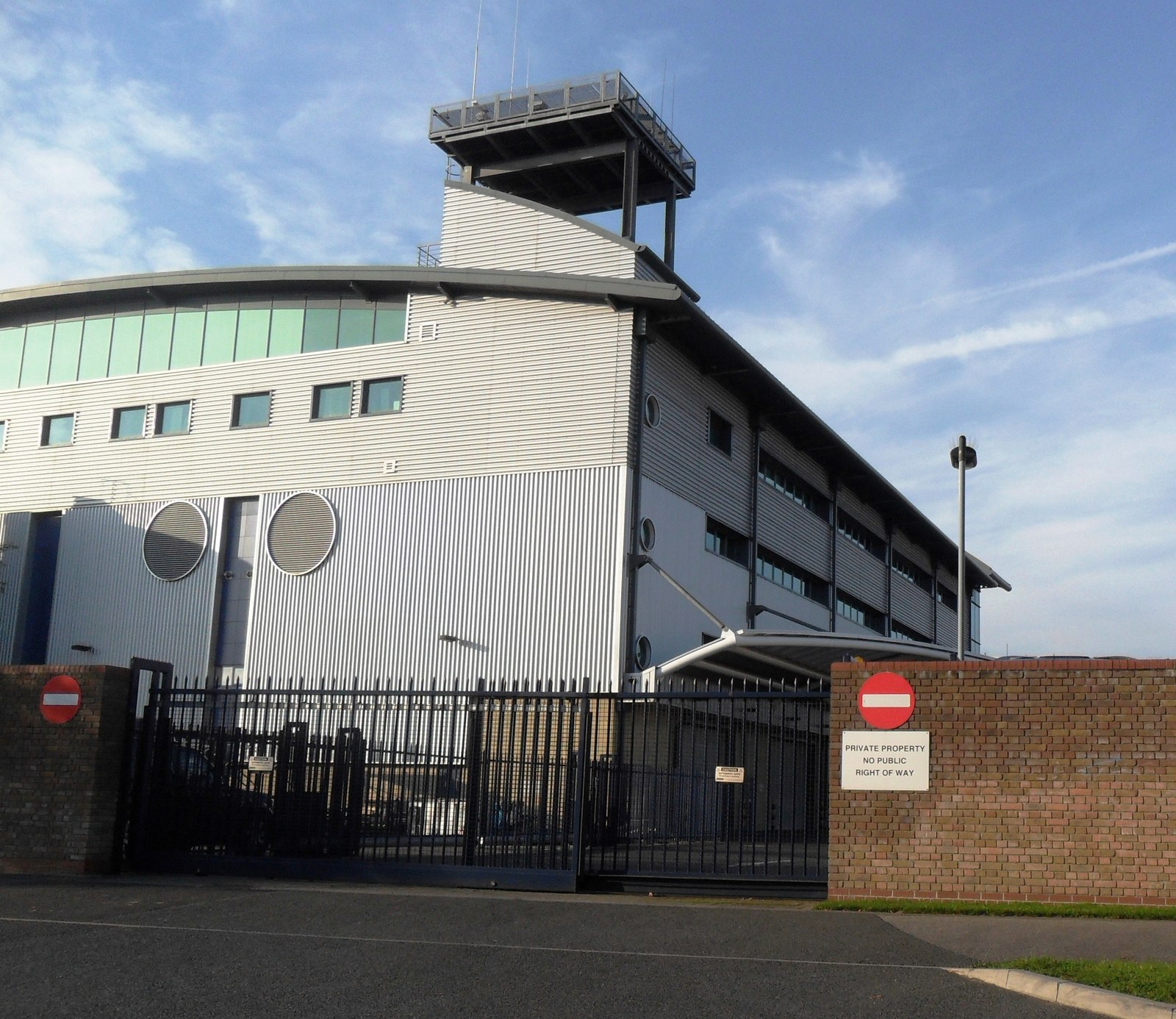
The RNLI works building, the site of the BDH factory, in 2011

In 1997, BDH closed the West Quay Road plant and half of its local workforce was made redundant. The factory was pulled down and the land is now occupied by Poole Lifeboat Station, other buildings making up the Royal National Lifeboat Institution headquarters, and the Lifeboat College, which opened in 2004.
