= 83-foot patrol boat =

American Coast Guard patrol craft

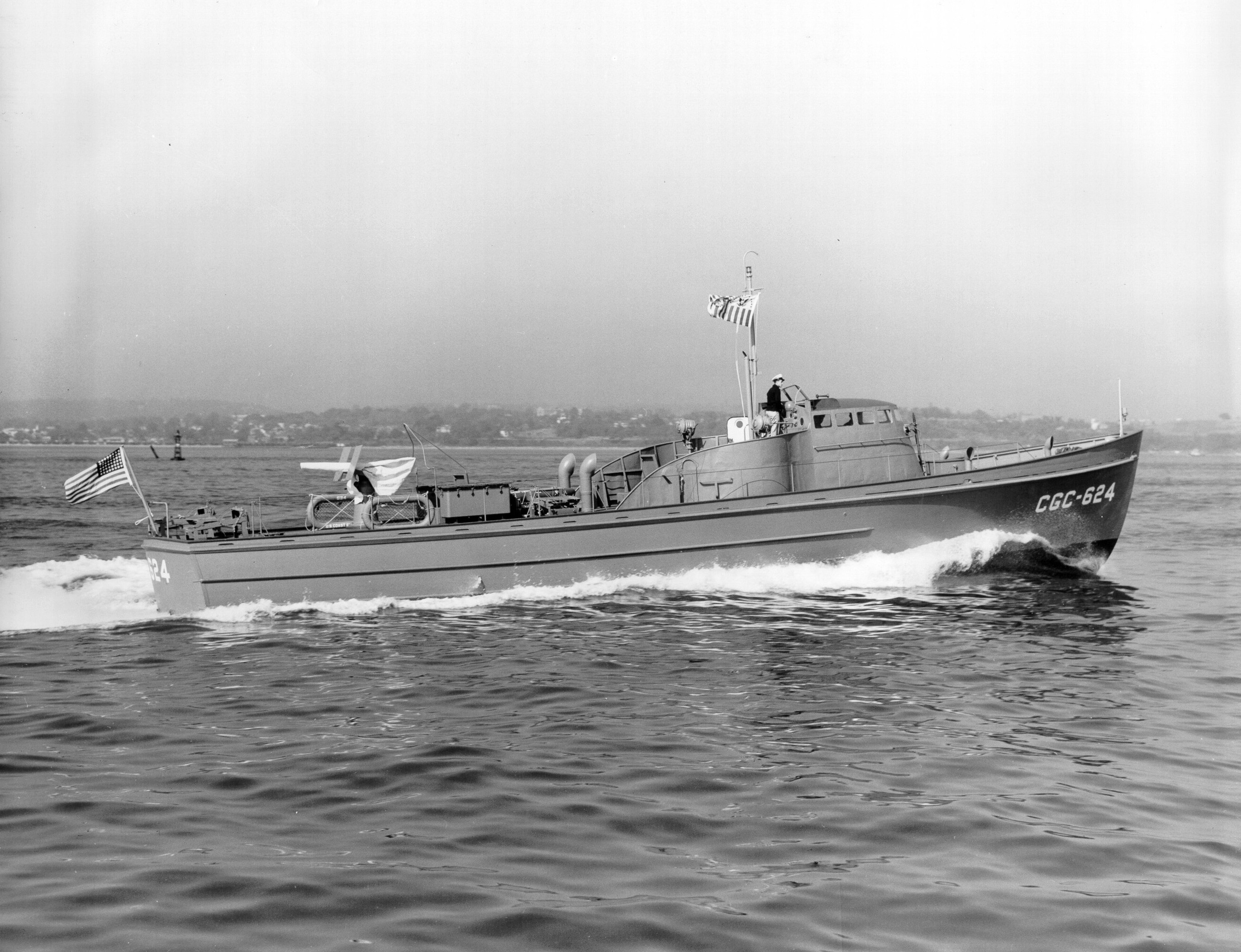
- The 83-foot CGC-624 (later USCG-14) in 1942

Class overview
- Name: 83-foot patrol boat
- Builders: Wheeler Shipyard, Brooklyn, New York
- Operators: United States Coast Guard
- Preceded by: 400-series patrol boat
- Succeeded by: Cape-class and Point-class cutters
- Completed: 230
- Preserved: 2

General characteristics
- Class & type: Patrol boat
- Displacement: 76 tons fully loaded
- Length: 83 ft (25 m)
- Beam: 16 ft (4.9 m)
- Height: 64 in (1,600 mm)
- Installed power: Twin Sterling Viking II gasoline engines
- Propulsion: twin propellers
- Speed: 20 kt

The United States Coast Guard wooden-hulled 83-foot patrol boats (also called cutters) were all built by Wheeler Shipyard in Brooklyn, New York during World War II. The first 136 cutters were fitted with a tapered-roof Everdur silicon bronze wheelhouse but due to a growing scarcity of that metal during the war, the later units were fitted with a flat-roofed plywood wheelhouse. A total of 230 83-footers were built and entered service with the Coast Guard during the war. Twelve other 83-footers were built for the Navy and were transferred to Latin American navies.

The patrol boats were powered by two 600-horsepower "Viking 2nd" Model TCG-8 inline eight-cylinder gasoline engines manufactured by the Sterling Engine Company. Their combined fuel economy was poor: 100 gallons per hour at a cruising speed of 12 knots, 120 gallons per hour at full throttle.

The class was followed by Cape-class 95-foot patrol boat (or cutter) and 82-foot Point-class cutter.

Two of the cutters still survive. One, D-Day veteran CG-83366, is undergoing restoration to serve as a museum. The other, CG-83527, was a public attraction in the Seattle area from 2004-2016 and is now used as a home by its new owner.

== Rescue Flotilla One ==
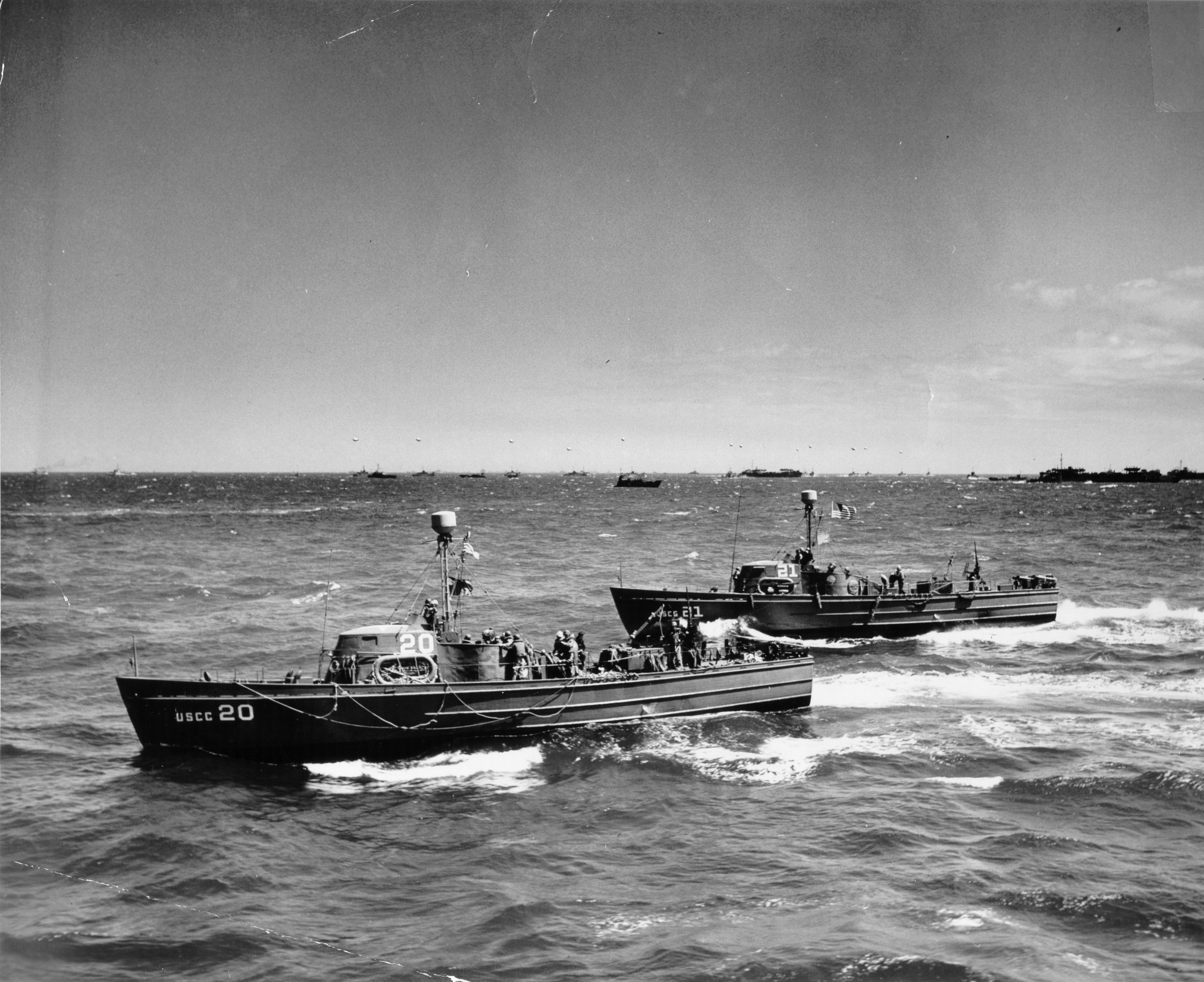
USCG-20 and USCG-21 off Normandy

Sixty of the 83-foot cutters were sent to England to serve as rescue craft off each of the landing beaches during the Invasion of Normandy. Officially called Rescue Flotilla One (ResFlo One), the cutters were nicknamed the "Matchbox Fleet" because their wood construction and large gasoline tanks made them potential tinderboxes.

Renumbered USCG-1 through USCG-60, they were able to pull almost 500 men from the water on D-Day. The thirty cutters assigned to the American sector saved 194 men off shore from Omaha Beach and 157 near Utah Beach. Arriving off the invasion beaches at 5:30 AM, the cutter USCG-16 alone rescued 126 men that day. The thirty cutters assigned to the British and Canadian sectors saved 133 men from the water off Gold, Juno and Sword Beaches.

No cutters were lost to enemy fire, but USCG-27 and USCG-47 foundered along the Normandy Coast during a storm on June 21, 1944. Operating from June through December 1944, the cutter flotilla saved 1438 lives.

== CGC 83525 ==
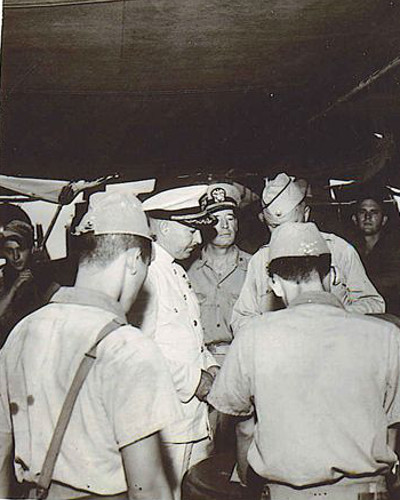
RADM Marshall Greer, USN, accepts the surrender of 2nd Lt Kinichi Yamada aboard CGC 83525

CGC 83525 has the honor of being the only US Coast Guard cutter to host an official surrender ceremony. On 4 September 1945, CGC 83525 transported US Navy RADM Marshall R. Greer to Aguigan Island in the Marianas to accept the surrender of the Japanese garrison that held the island from 2nd Lt Kinichi Yamada, two days after the Surrender of Japan aboard USS Missouri.

Decommissioned after the war, CGC 83525 would be sold off after the war to a civilian owner, eventually being abandoned in the Sacramento Delta. Parts of the vessel were salvaged during a clean up effort of the Delta in 2011 and donated to Coast Guard Station Rio Vista for use as a memorial.

== CG-83366 ==
In September 2018, a surviving 83-foot patrol boat, civilian name Tiburon (formerly CG-83366, built in 1942) was purchased by a Seattle couple for $100 from another private owner who had converted it to a motor yacht. The previous owner had become unable to keep it afloat due to health issues, and the boat eventually sank at its moorings on Lake Union. It was refloated, and its poor condition resulted in its cheap price. It is the only remaining member of Rescue Flotilla One, and served off Normandy in June 1944 under the simplified hull number USCG-11.

The couple began restoring CG-83366, and for the 75th anniversary of the Invasion of Normandy (D-Day) in June 2019, it was on display on Lake Union near the Center for Wooden Boats and the Museum of History & Industry. While moored in Seattle, CG-83366 had also been the site of crew reunions for D-Day celebrations in 2006 and 2007. The cutter is about halfway through a major restoration and preservation effort to return it to its WWII-era condition and appearance. Future plans are to operate CG-83366 as a living history exhibit in the Puget Sound area as well as static display museum ship on the Lake Union waterfront between cruises. Various components being used in the restoration have come from the other surviving 83-footer, CG-83527, itself a former living history exhibit in Puget Sound, before it was sold for use as a house boat in the waterways around Everett.

== See also ==
- History of Poole: World War II and redevelopment
- Crash boats of World War 2
- Wooden boats of World War 2

== Sources ==
- Flynn, James T. Jr. (June 23, 2014), "World War II Brings 83-Footers and What Have You" (PDF), U. S. Coast Guard Small Cutters and Patrol Boats 1915 – 2012: Vessel of less than 100-feet in Length, United States Department of Defense, pp. 18–30
