= Platform 4 =

- Company type: Performance and visual arts company
- Industry: Arts, theatre, performance, visual arts
- Founded: 1997
- Founder: Catherine Church
- Headquarters: Winchester, UK
- Area served: UK (Regional and national touring)
- Key people: Catherine Church (Artistic Director)
- Services: Devising and touring performance work, participatory installations, and celebratory events.
- Revenue: 22,097 pound sterling (2020)

Platform 4 is a national performance and visual arts company based in Winchester, Hampshire, in the UK.

Founded in 1997, artistic director Catherine Church oversees the projects of Platform 4 and their associate artists. Longterm creative design partners for Platform 4 include Su Houser, who has designed many of their most recent projects, Simon Plumridge, designer and director, previously of the Ding Foundation (BAC supported artists) and composer and musician Jules Bushell. Platform 4 are Associate Artists at Lighthouse Poole's Centre for the Arts and are consultants in the venue's recent review process.

Its work is designer-led and often embraces this as starting points for work which is characterised by the visual and sonic worlds being as important as text.

The work of Platform 4 was documented as part of Dramaturgy and Performance, by Cathy Turner and Synne Behrndt.

The Memory Points Book was written as a documentation of the company's long running Memory Points Project.

== Mission ==
The company's mission statement is:

Platform 4 make work that tours regionally and nationally and creates tailor-made participatory installations and celebratory events. In the last 25 years they have devised a wide range of projects for venues, schools and colleges, youth theatres and community groups.

The company was formed in 1997, Artistic Director Church says "I had no idea how to get into making theatre - all doors seemed shut – so I felt the best way was to start making my own. I was obsessed with the artist Kurt Schwitters and his collage technique – constructing elements and fragments from everyday life and 're packaging them so to speak' so this turned into our first piece in 1997: 'The Paper Forest'".

== Process ==
Platform 4 thereafter continued using visual stimuli - painters or paintings - as the starting point for their shows, and for many years toured devised works that were the result of collaboration between writers, designers and performers. Platform 4 have worked with Anna Maria Murphy, from Kneehigh Theatre, the writers Hattie Naylor and Matthew Wilkie and Nell Leyshon in a dramaturg role.

For many years, Platform 4 shows were seen as separate from their participatory work but in 2008 they started to combine both strands of the companies work. The result was a project started with the Southampton's Connection Club, a social group for people with early onset dementia and their supporters. This resulted in the first two important pieces for the company: The Starlight Picture Palace, an installation piece made for the group and their extended families at the Nuffield Theatre, Southampton and Memory Points. which toured to the Point, Eastleigh, Winchester Theatre Royal, Lighthouse Poole Centre for the Arts and the South Bank Centre, London.

Platform 4 work is now centred firmly in the area of 'co creation' working with groups of people from all walks of life who inspire and influence the work.

The company spent years coming to the realisation that the vision for all the pieces of work created was in making 'artistic' experiences' inspired by and for the people who immediately surrounded them. Groups of people young and old that the company wanted to support, where the micro is presented on the macro scale - telling intimate stories or making manifest tiny moments in detailed pieces of work.

== Past productions ==
- Invisible Music
- The Legend of the Holy Drinker
- Memory Points (Touring and South Bank Centre) - voted one of the best top 10 pieces of theatre by Lyn Gardner in The Guardian for 2013.
- The Starlight Picture Palace at The Nuffield Theatre, Southampton
- Macbeth (Touring).
- The Tempest (Touring).
- Bliss (Salisbury Playhouse)
- Shiver (Touring)
- Claustrophobia (Touring)
- The Visitation of Mr Collioni
- Dr Heidegger’s Experiment
- 3 Greek Myths from a Lisbon Laundry
- Animal Tales
- The Paper Forest

Platform 4's participatory work has been influenced by installation, creating magical shadow filled environments for all ages and kinds of groups, this work has evolved and become more important to the company ethos.

Invisible Music a musical journey fora 5 musicians with voices sampled within the music, is the company's latest project based on Artistic Director Catherine Church's work with Winchester's Lip Reading Community and her mother's deafness. Touring 2018, its Church's most personal piece to date.

== Memory Points ==
"The theatre – long corridors, foyers, dusty dead-ends, unexpected nooks, empty stages, dressing rooms and lighting boxes – becomes a metaphor for the mind. Platform 4 animate these spaces through a mixture of music and installation, offering fragments and snatches, rather than a tidy narrative. The show operates like memory itself: sometimes full of clarity, sometimes fuzzy. On occasion, it's gaudy with colour and at other times faded and sepia-toned. Just when you think you've grasped the show, it slides away from you."

"Memory Point(s) by Platform 4 is a mystery tour of the theatre in which the audience encounter images and sounds that create and trigger memories." Memory Points is a deliberately disorientating journey using memory as an emotional trigger. Working together with the Connections Club, a group of people living with early onset dementia and their supporters, in association with the Alzheimers Society, Platform 4 used – snatches of songs, poems, commonplace family mementoes, even objects, photographs of special times, people and places. This piece was influenced by the current fascination in the contemporary theatre world with 'Site Specific' work.

The 'Memory Points' performance followed a 2-year collaboration with members of the Alzheimer's Society Southampton-Eastleigh Connections Club, and the Eastleigh Singing For The Brain.

Platform 4 used parts of a building which suited memories. By mirroring familiar occasions and selecting narratives from the group, they wanted the general public to compare their own journeys through life. Stopping to reflect on a series of rooms in a series of buildings the control box, the dressing room, an under-stage cinema. Memory Points was made for 4 buildings in the UK: The Point, Eastleigh, Winchester Theatre Royal, Lighthouse Poole Centre for the Arts and backstage and in the tunnels underneath the South Bank Centre, London.

The piece although inspired by the people the company met over a 5-year period was targeted for a general audience who met together in small groups and 'did the tour'. The piece highlighted the issues around dementia but also tried to raise awareness by making a unique piece of work that worked on nostalgia and personal memory.

Memory Points was voted one of the Top 10 pieces of theatre by Guardian Critic Lyn Gardner for 2013, receiving four stars.

A book was published about the Memory Points journey and was sold in the Royal Festival Hall and sold through the Platform 4 website.

Memory Points was part of The Festival of Love at the South Bank Centre in 2014.

Memory Points returned to South Bank Centre in 2015 running from September 24 to October 4, the opening coincided with World Alzheimer's Day.

INVISIBLE MUSIC 2016–present

In 2016 Catherine Church started work on a follow up to Memory Points - and created a sound piece called INVISIBLE MUSIC inspired by her own mother's hearing loss. She describes it 'as a love letter to her Mum' based on a poem she wrote about losing her hearing. The Memory Point's band that formed for the previous show came together to develop this work further with long term collaborators Jules Bushell and Pete Flood (from the band Bellowhead).

The participant's voices from Church's mum's lip reading classes were metaphorically and literally at the heart of the piece - coming out of speakers in the centre of the space. The loose narrative of the piece centred around the idea of a tropical island with its beauty but isolation, setting sail to search for something, then drifting and sinking into underwater distortions and darker emotions, which then gives way to a gradual recovery and discovery of a new island at the end. This was all told through the voices of the lip reading group within the music. The piece also addressed the concept of communication - how do performers communicate and listen on stage to play their music? How do they get their cues? Watching the performers involved in this process enabled the audience to reflect on the communication and 'visual listening' that becomes even more important when you are losing your hearing. The piece embraced the universal themes of ageing / reflection on life and dealing with loss of sound - but crucially addresses what it means to communicate when there is a language barrier but loads of love and good will – so it works on the level of the musical journey but could be accessed on different levels depending on the types of audience – hearing impaired followed it through transcription and projection of text created by the Nottingham based digital artist Barret Hodgson.

This work premiered at Theatre Royal Winchester in February 2018 after a year's development and toured throughout 2018.
