= Kaspa's =

British dessert chain

Kaspa's Desserts
- Type: Private
- Industry: Desserts
- Founded: March 7, 2013; 13 years ago
- Founder: Azhar Rehman (Director); Qasim Ali Rehman (Director)
- Headquarters: Croydon, London, England
- Number of locations: 104
- Area served: Worldwide
- Owner: Azhar Rehman (Director); Qasim Ali Rehman (Director)
- Website: kaspas.co.uk

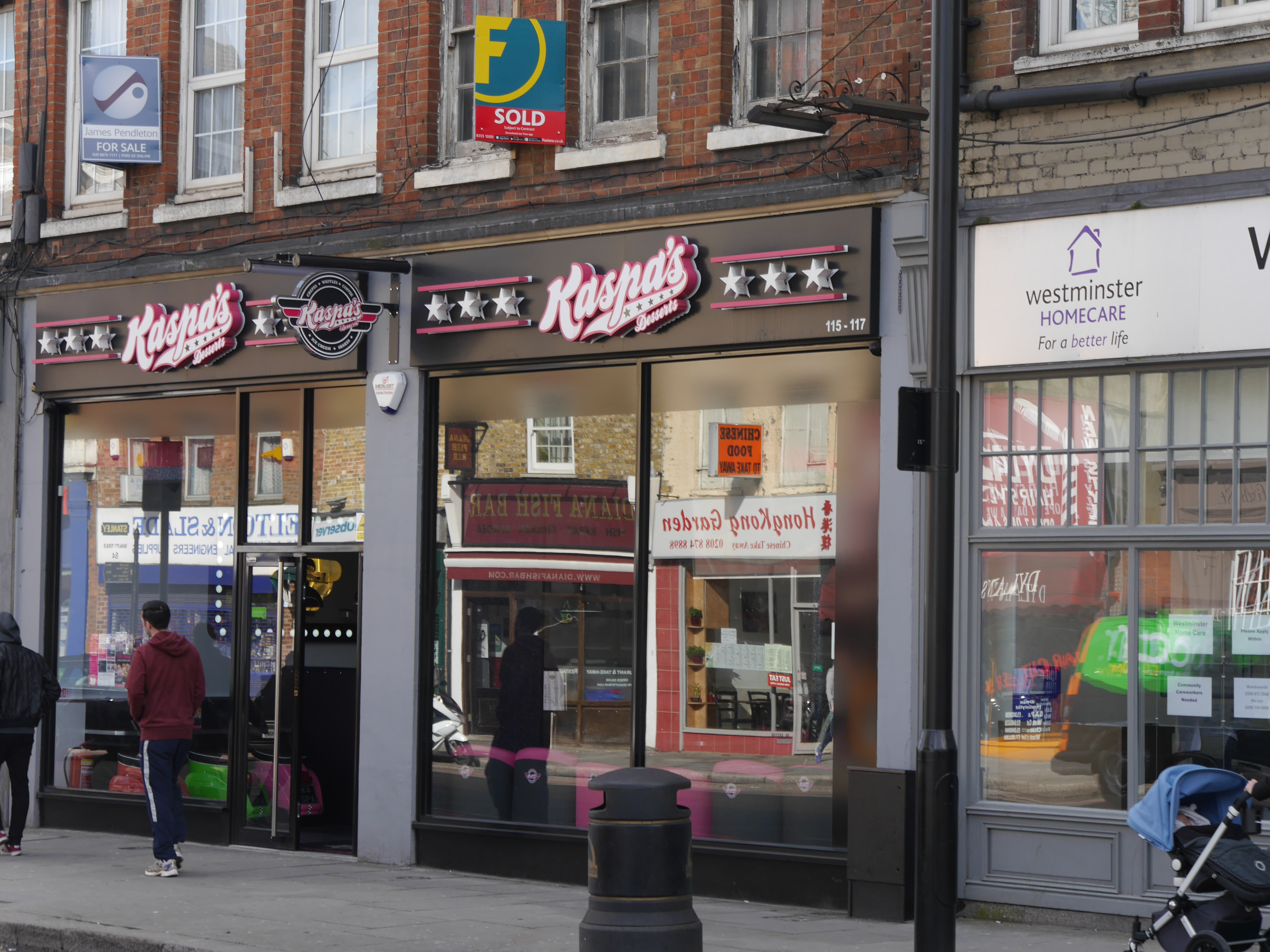
Kaspa's, Wandsworth High Street, London

Kaspa's (also known as Kaspa's Desserts) are a British chain of ice cream parlours, which offer other hot and cold desserts. They started in 2012 in Croydon, South London. The business is based on franchising the model and branding to other companies who run Kaspa's dessert houses.

Their products "are no GM, suitable for vegetarians, handmade and imported from the heart of Italy, with no artificial preservatives." They have also been described as "an American dessert chain".

As of June 2021, according to the Kaspa's website, they have 104 locations, mostly in the United Kingdom. Kaspa's opened their first overseas location in Islamabad, Pakistan.
