= Poole town centre =

Town centre of Poole, Dorset in England

Coordinates: 50.717726°N 1.978700°W

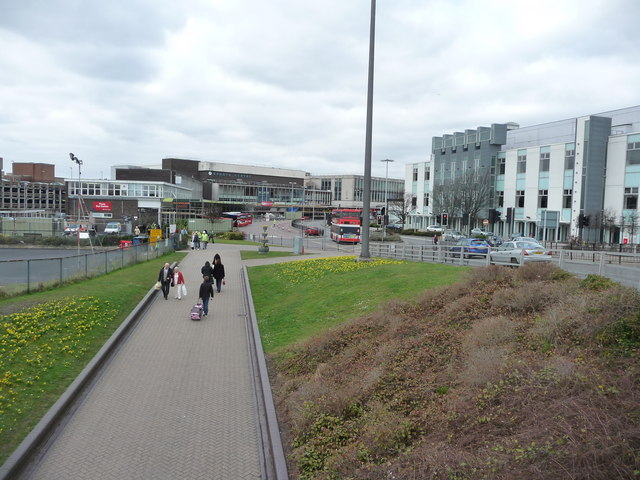
Kingland Road in Poole town centre. The Lighthouse is on the right, the bus station is on the left.

Poole town centre is an area of Poole, Dorset. It is just to the west of Poole Park. Poole Old Town is home to many historic buildings like the 15th-century Scaplen's Court, the 18th-century Custom House and the Victorian St James' Church.

== History ==
The Poole explosion of 1988 caused 3,500 people to be evacuated out of the town centre in the biggest peacetime evacuation the country had seen since the World War II.

In 2020, Bournemouth, Christchurch and Poole Council revealed plans for regeneration of the area with 25 million pounds for Poole High Street. Poole railway station could potentially be moved and rebuilt in a new location.

In November 2022, a sea-life mural dedicated to Philip Henry Gosse, the naturist pioneer who was raised in the town, was unveiled in Poole High Street.

== Amenities ==
- Dolphin Shopping Centre
- The Lighthouse
- Poole Harbour
- Poole Bus Station
- Poole Museum

== Politics ==
Poole town centre is part of the Poole parliamentary constituency. It is in Poole Town ward for elections to Bournemouth, Christchurch and Poole Council.
