= Birthdays (retailer) =

British greeting cards retailer

- Formerly: Ron Wood Greeting Cards Holdings
- Company type: Limited company
- Industry: Retail
- Founded: 1966
- Founder: Ron and Gail Wood
- Defunct: 2012
- Fate: Brand discontinued
- Headquarters: Loughton, Essex, England
- Area served: United Kingdom and Ireland
- Products: Greeting cards, stationery and fancy goods
- Revenue: £144.7 million (2003)
- Owner: Clinton Cards
- Number of employees: 3,260 (2003)
- Website: Birthdays website (archived)

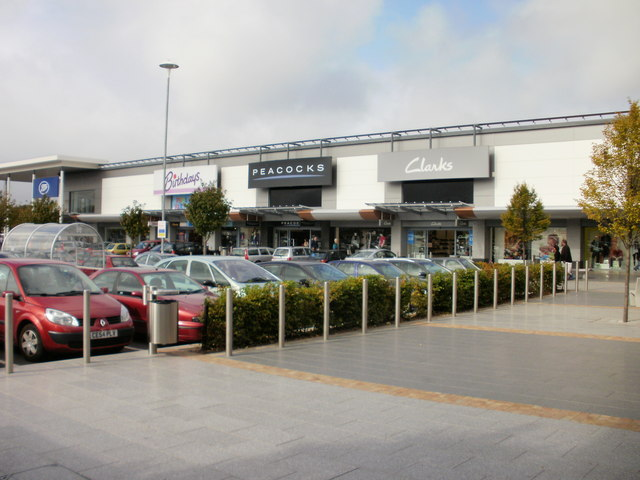
A Birthdays store in Newport

Birthdays was a British greeting card retailer. The business originated in 1966, when Ron and Gail Wood started a greeting-card wholesaler in Bury, Greater Manchester; it was incorporated in 1969 as Ron Wood Greeting Cards Holdings. The Birthdays retail format was introduced in 1986, and the range broadened to include plush toys, ornaments and novelty items. The company was renamed Birthdays Greeting Cards in 1996, after Wood sold his holding to a management buy-in. Clinton Cards acquired the chain, by then around 500 shops, in 2004. Birthdays was placed in administration in 2009, and the brand was discontinued in 2012 when Clinton Cards itself collapsed.

== Ownership ==
In 2003, the Scottish entrepreneur Tom Hunter and Chris Gorman, owner of the Gadget Shop chain, acquired control of Birthdays through Hunter's West Coast Capital. In November 2004, Clinton Cards bought the chain, which then operated about 500 stores, for £46 million.

On 21 May 2009, Clinton Cards placed Birthdays into administration, writing £44 million off the value of the business; the stores continued to trade and Clinton Cards later bought many of them back from the administrator.

In May 2012, Clinton Cards itself entered administration, handled by Zolfo Cooper, and announced the closure of all its Birthdays stores, ending the brand. The following month, American Greetings acquired 397 of the surviving Clinton Cards stores.
