= Wessex Youth Orchestra =

The Wessex Youth Orchestra (WYO) is a youth orchestra based in the Bournemouth and Poole areas of Dorset, England. Founded in 1971, the WYO is composed of approximately 100 student musicians from grades 6 to 8+. Three annual concerts are performed, mostly in the Wessex Hall at Poole's centre for the arts, Lighthouse (Poole). The orchestra has also performed nationally and internationally in festivals, tours and exchanges, and has been broadcast by the BBC.

Auditions are required for admittance into the orchestra. Strings members require a grade 6 level, and woodwind, brass and percussion members require a grade 7 level. Rehearsals are held in St. Andrew's Hall, on the Constitution Hill site of the Bournemouth and Poole College of further education.

== History ==
The Wessex Youth Orchestra's first rehearsal took place back in January 1971, in Poole College main hall in North Road. Originally known as the Poole College Youth Orchestra, its membership consisted of a handful of violins, two cellos, many flutes and clarinets, one trumpet and one horn. Activities included choral singing, and there were two opera performances and a concert with dance and movement, as well as chamber music coaching.

When the Bournemouth and Poole Colleges merged, the orchestra's name was changed to reflect the entire community of Wessex. The Orchestra was conducted from its foundation until 2007 by Don Riddell who was awarded the MBE for services to the Wessex Youth Orchestra in the Christmas honours list 1999. After his death in 2007, his daughter, Susanna Riddell assumed the conductor duties.

== Tours ==
In the Orchestra's 40-year history there have been a total of 15 tours in Europe. Twelve tours occurred before 1999 under the baton of Don Riddell. There were no tours until 2009, when the WYO traveled to the Black Forest under Susanna Riddell. In 2010, there was a brief tour to Cologne, where the Orchestra performed three concerts. In 2012, the WYO travelled to Austria for the Salzburg music festival.

== Concerts ==
The WYO gives three main concerts a year: a Christmas show, a summer charity “Prom” and a main showcase performance, the Gala Concert, which is normally in March. Notable venues have included the Bournemouth Winter Gardens, Royal Albert Hall, Royal Festival Hall, Birmingham Symphony Hall and the Bournemouth International Centre.

== See also ==
- List of youth orchestras
