= Clintons =

Chain of stores in the UK

- Trade name: Clintons
- Formerly: Clinton Cards
- Type: Subsidiary
- Industry: Greeting card
- Founded: 1968; 58 years ago
- Founder: Don Lewin
- Headquarters: Newark, Nottinghamshire, England
- Parent: American Greetings (2012–2018); Weiss Family (2018–2019); Esquire Retail Limited (2019–2024); Pillarbox Designs (2024–)
- Website: clintonscards.co.uk

Clintons, previously branded as Clinton Cards, is a chain of stores in the UK founded in 1968 by Don Lewin and best known for selling greeting cards. It also sells soft toys and related gift products.

It was listed on the London Stock Exchange and was a constituent of the FTSE Fledgling Index. In May 2012 the company entered administration and following the closure of 350 branches, the company was bought by American Greetings.

The company was placed in administration in 2012 and 2019 and was purchased both times by companies owned by the Weiss family. Clintons was managed by Eddie Shepard, from American Greetings' subsidiary, Schurman Retail Group.

Starting in July 2012, the company began the gradual introduction of a new store design and logo, which removed the previous 'Clinton Cards' branding, replacing it with the new 'Clintons' name.

In 2024, Clintons was acquired by Pillarbox Designs, a parent company of the similarly sized greetings card retailer Cardzone and gift stores as Mooch. Talks around merging the two businesses had been taking place since prior to the COVID-19 pandemic. The Clintons brand was retained and some stores transitioned between the brands. Pillarbox's Paul Taylor replaced Eddie Shepard as Clintons CEO.

== History ==
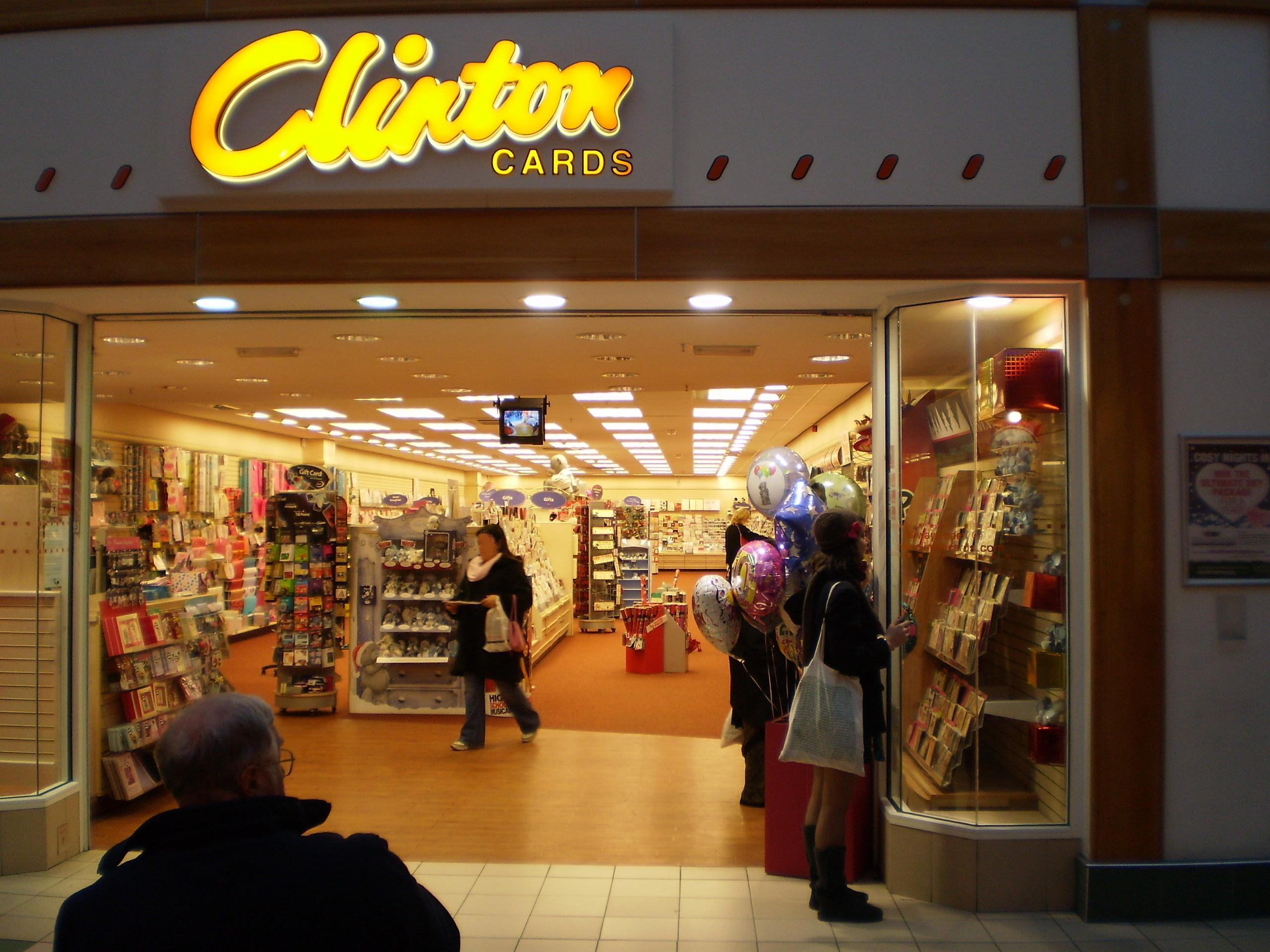
Clinton Cards shop in Rugby in 2009

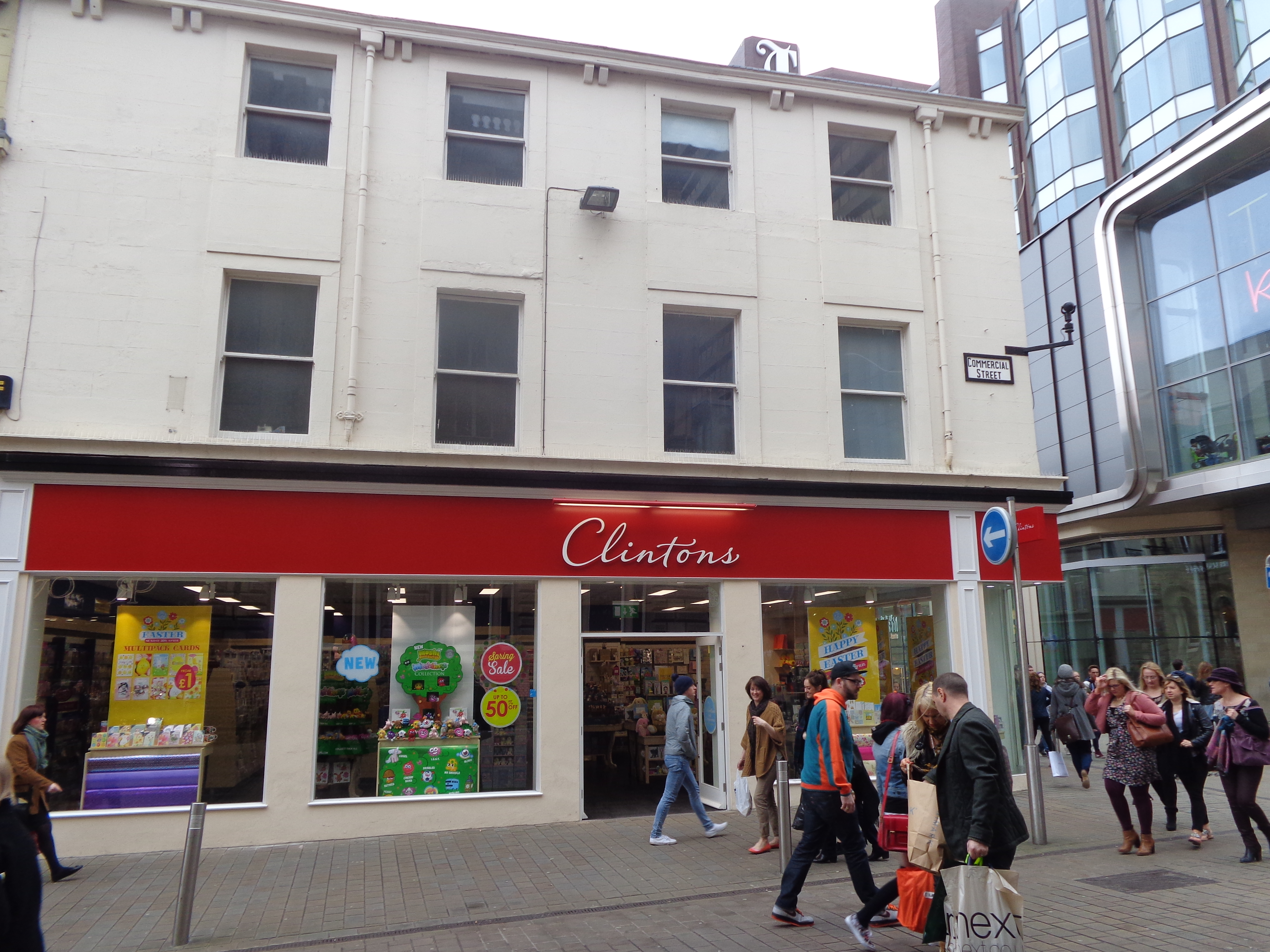
Clinton Cards displaying the new logos in Leeds

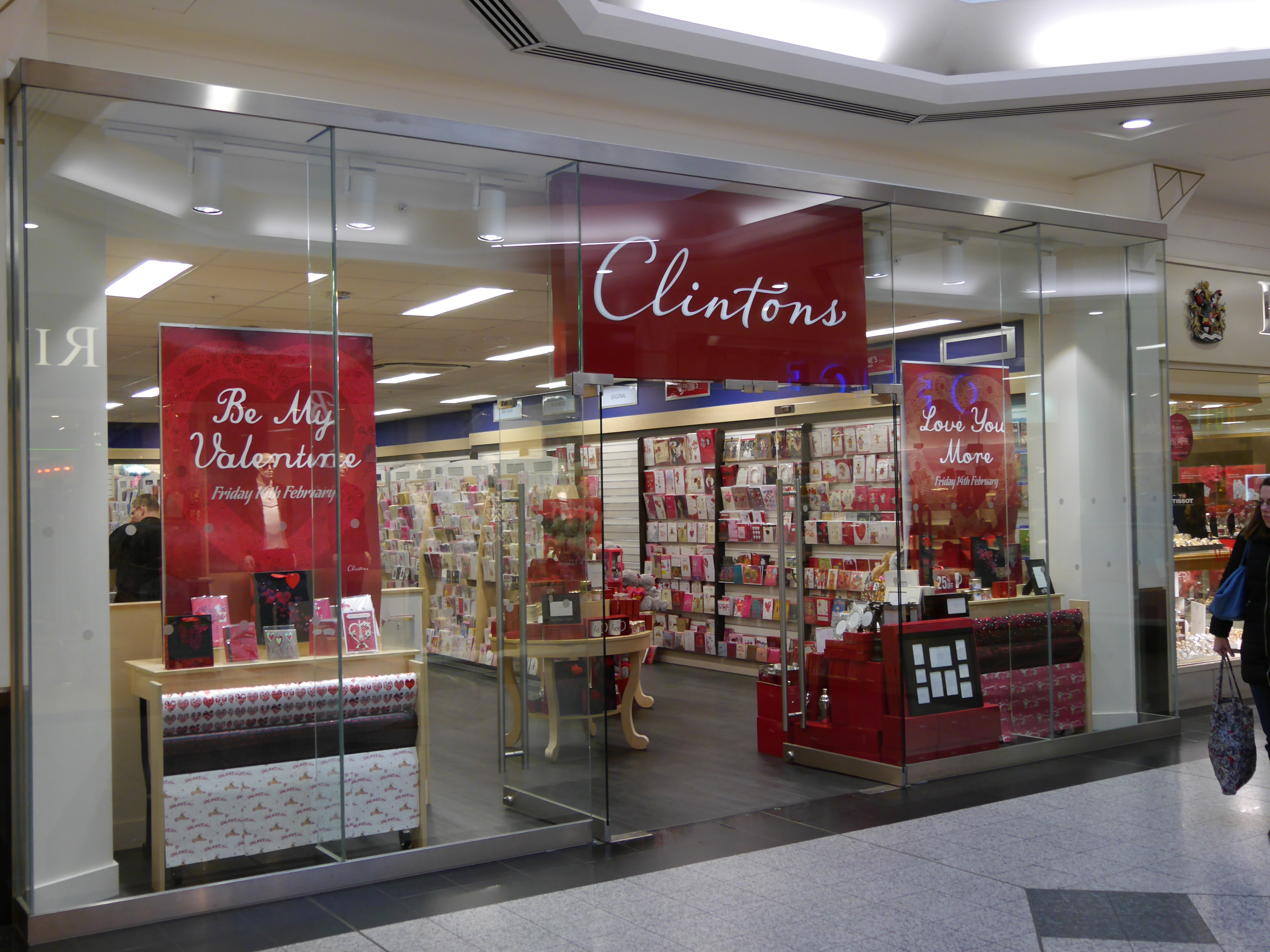
A former Clintons location in Putney Exchange, London. It is now a branch of rival Card Factory.

Clinton Cards was founded in 1968 when Don Lewin opened his first shop in Epping, Essex. The business grew to 77 shops by 1988 and was then successfully floated on the London Stock Exchange.

In 2004, the company purchased the Birthdays chain of card and party shops for £46.4 million but placed the subsidiary into administration in 2009, subsequently buying back 140 of the 332 stores.

In May 2012, the company's main supplier American Greetings bought £36 million of Clintons debt from its main lending banks, and immediately called in the debt for payment. Clinton Cards was unable to make the payment and entered administration on 9 May, with Peter Saville, Simon Freakley and Anne O'Keefe of Zolfo Cooper LLP, appointed as Joint Administrators of the Company. A week later 350 branches were closed, including all the Birthdays branches, and the remaining 397 stores were purchased the following month by US-based American Greetings' subsidiary Lakeshore Lending Limited. That October, 12 stores were disposed of and sold to its main rival Card Factory.

In 2023, Clintons was once again facing financial difficulties; the company appointed advisors to help it avoid insolvency and looked to close 38 of its 179 shops.

== See also ==
- Me to You Bears
