= Druckers Vienna Patisserie =

Chain of pâtisseries in Great Britain

Drucker's Vienna Patisserie is a chain of pâtisseries in the United Kingdom. It was founded by Andre Drucker in 1964, for the purpose of introducing the people of his adopted city of Birmingham to the pâtisseries he had known when he was a young man in Vienna.

As of 2009 there are 42 sites throughout the country, particularly in the West Midlands, and a further 14 stores in and around Birmingham. Each store is supplied daily with products prepared by 80 bakers and chefs in the main bakery in Birmingham.
