= Lighthouse (Poole) =

Arts centre in Poole, Dorset, England

Coordinates: 50°43′05″N 1°58′40″W

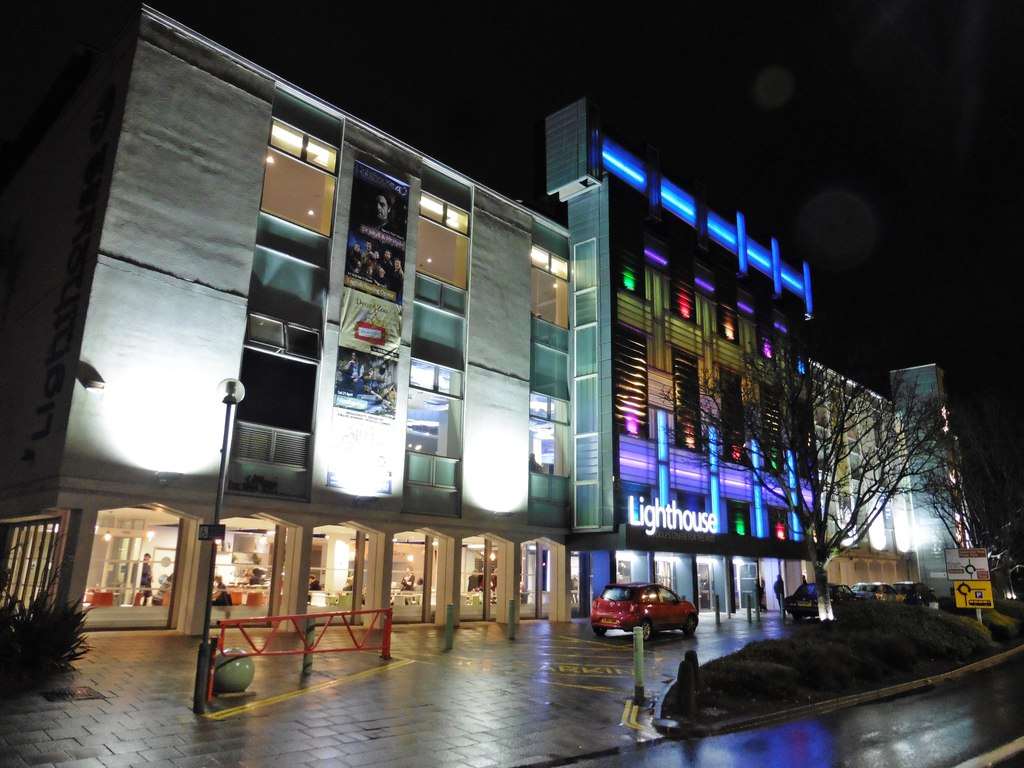
- Company type: Arts centre, Theatre and Cinema
- Founded: Poole in 1978
- Headquarters: Poole
- Website: www.lighthousepoole.co.uk

Lighthouse is an arts centre in Poole, Dorset, England. According to Arts Council England it is the largest arts centre in the United Kingdom outside London.

It has a 669-seat theatre, a 1,500 seat concert hall, a 130-seat studio, a 103-seat cinema, a large gallery for photography and art, a restaurant and four function rooms. The concert hall is home to the Bournemouth Symphony Orchestra.

The Lighthouse is opposite Poole Bus Station and the Dolphin Shopping Centre.

== History, development and funding ==
The Poole Arts Centre (Towngate Theatre, Wessex Hall and Ashley Cinema) opened in April 1978 to serve the South East Dorset conurbation. The venue closed in May 2002 for an £8.5 million radical refurbishment and overhaul. This was paid for by Arts Council Lottery Awards, the Borough of Poole and through private donations. It reopened as Lighthouse, Poole's Centre for the Arts in October 2002. The refurbishment added new extensive facilities including a modern cinema, expanded concert hall and photography labs. Other additions included expanded customer facilities and a new restaurant.

Lighthouse receives additional funding from Arts Council England. In 2005/06 £230,000; in 2006/07 they received £330,000; in 2007/08 they were to receive a total of £339,080. Lighthouse is currently owned by the Poole Arts Trust Ltd.

== Programming and types of shows ==
Lighthouse provides a wide-ranging programme, including:

=== Theatre ===
- Mid-scale musical tours (such as Fame and Blood Brothers)
- Opera (annually from English Touring Opera)
- Dance (both contemporary and classical)
- Ballet
- Plays (ranging from classics such as Romeo and Juliet, An Inspector Calls to more modern day 'kitchen sink dramas')
- Pantomime (Cinderella for 2006/7 starring Bobby Crush, Peter Duncan & Brian Cant)
- Comedy

=== Concert hall ===
- Weekly performances on Wednesday nights from the Bournemouth Symphony Orchestra
- Regular performances from the Wessex Youth Orchestra
- World music
- Bands and artists have included: Kiss, The Fall, The Damned, David Essex, The Who, Ultravox, The Clash, Kate Bush, The Smiths, Oasis, Public Image Ltd, Tina Turner, Kings of Leon, U2, Bryan Ferry, The Wonder Stuff, Blondie, Paul Weller, The Teardrop Explodes, King Crimson, New Order, Siouxsie and the Banshees, Page & Plant, East 17, Wham!, The Cult, Rufus Wainwright, Kirsty MacColl, The Stranglers, Ozzy Osbourne, Doves, Ian Brown, The Style Council, Fun Loving Criminals, Lulu, G4, Tears For Fears, Madness, Boomtown Rats, Adam Faith, Squeeze, ELO, The Jam, The Jackson Five

=== Studio ===
- Small scale children's theatre
- Small scale adult theatre

=== Cinema ===
Eclectic mix of world cinema, and recent releases normally presented 4–8 weeks after general release.

== See also ==
- Platform 4, theatre company
