= List of Old Bryanstonians =

The alumni of Bryanston School are known as Old Bryanstonians or OBs.

Bryanston School is a co-educational independent school for both day and boarding pupils in Blandford, north Dorset, England, near the village of Bryanston.

== Notable OBs ==
- Kwame Anthony Appiah (born 1954), philosopher and novelist
- Robert Baden-Powell, 3rd Baron Baden-Powell (1936–2019) grandson of Robert Baden-Powell, 1st Baron Baden-Powell (1857–1941)
- Clive Barda OBE (born 1945), photographer
- Nigel Barker (born 1972), fashion photographer, judge on America's Next Top Model
- Richard Bawden (born 1936), painter, printmaker
- Chris Beckett (born 1955), science fiction author
- Huw Bennett (born 1983), rugby player for Ospreys and Wales
- Jonathan Bowen (born 1956), computer scientist
- Myles Burnyeat (1939–2019), classicist and philosopher
- David Campbell Bannerman (born 1960), Conservative MEP
- Lara Cazalet (born 1971), actress
- Martin Checksfield (1939–2002), first-class cricketer
- Prince Alastair of Connaught (1914–1943), member of the British royal family
- Jasper Conran (born 1959), fashion designer
- Sebastian Conran (born 1956), designer
- Sir Terence Conran (1931–2020), designer, restaurateur and retailer
- Jago Cooper (born 1977), archaeologist
- Kevin Crossley-Holland (born 1941), children's author and poet
- Ollie Devoto (born 1993), rugby player for Bath and Exeter
- Sir Tony Durant (1928–2016), politician
- Sir Mark Elder CBE (born 1947), conductor
- Carolyn Fairbairn (born 1961), director-general of the Confederation of British Industry
- Sir Francis Ferris QC (1932–2018), High Court Judge
- Ben Fogle (born 1973), television presenter, adventurer
- Emilia Fox (born 1974), actress
- Freddie Fox (born 1989), actor
- Lucian Freud (1922–2011), painter
- John Eliot Gardiner (born 1943), conductor
- Jonathan Gathorne-Hardy (1933–2019), author
- Phil de Glanville (born 1968), rugby player for Bath and England, 38 caps, captain of England
- Roger Hammond (1936–2012), actor
- Charles Handley-Read (1916–1971), architectural critic
- Adrian Heath (1920–1992), painter
- William Herbert, 18th Earl of Pembroke politician and aristocrat
- Greg Hersov (born 1956), theatre director
- Sir Howard Hodgkin (1932–2017), painter
- Geoffrey Hoyle (born 1942), science fiction writer (son of Fred Hoyle)
- Richard Horden, (1944–2018), architect
- HRH Princess Haya bint Al Hussein (born 1974), daughter of King Hussein I of Jordan
- Max Irons (born 1985), actor
- Humphrey Kay (1923–2009), pathologist and haematologist
- David Lipsey, Baron Lipsey, (born 1948) politician, journalist, Labour life peer
- Nicholas Logsdail (born 1945), art dealer
- Charles Lutyens (1933–2021), painter, sculptor, mosaicist, and art therapist
- Cerys Matthews (born 1969), singer-songwriter
- Drummond Matthews (1931–1997), geologist and marine geophysicist
- Ella Marchment (born 1992), opera and theatre director
- Nick Meers (born 1955), landscape photographer
- Anne Marie Morris (born 1957), politician
- Jasper Morrison (born 1959), designer
- Simon Napier-Bell (born 1939), pop group manager, writer and journalist
- John Nissen (born 1942), founder of Cloudworld
- Nicholas Phillips, Baron Phillips of Worth Matravers (born 1938), Master of the Rolls, 2000–2005, and Lord Chief Justice of England and Wales from 2005–2008
- Giselle Norman (born 2001), fashion model
- Henry Pyrgos (born 1989), rugby player for Glasgow and captain for Scotland
- Frederick Sanger (1918–2013), biochemist; the fourth person to become a double Nobel Laureate
- Robert Saxton (born 1953), composer
- James Scott (born 1941), filmmaker
- Mark Scott (1923–2013), rower who competed in the 1948 Summer Olympics
- Clive Seale (born 1955), sociologist
- Saira Shah (born 1964), journalist and documentary filmmaker
- Tahir Shah (born 1966), writer and television presenter
- Angus John Mackintosh Stewart (1936–1998), author of Sandel
- Amy Studt (born 1986), singer
- Eliot Sumner (born 1990), singer
- Prince Muhammad bin Talal (1940– 2021), member of the Jordanian royal family
- Quinlan Terry (born 1937), architect
- Paul Thompson (born 1959), Chair of the British Council
- Philip Trevelyan (born 1943), film director
- Iain Tuckett, pioneer in urban regeneration
- Justin Urquhart Stewart (born 1955), investment manager
- Julian Vereker (1945–2000), electronic engineer
- Nick Willing (born 1961), filmmaker
- Tony Wober (1939-2023), rower and senior RAF Officer
- Michael Yates (1919–2001), stage and television designer and executive
