= Coade =

Coade is a surname. Notable people with the surname include:

- Caroline Coade, American violist
- Eleanor Coade (1733–1821), British businesswoman
- Peter Coade (1942–2025), Canadian meteorologist and broadcast weather presenter
- Thorold Coade (1896–1963), British school teacher and headmaster
  - Coade Hall
