= Ian Mackenzie-Kerr =

British book designer

Ian Mackenzie-Kerr (18 November 1929 – 27 May 2005) was a British book designer. He worked for Thames & Hudson for almost fifty years, where he was instrumental in transforming the appearance of their books.

== Life and work ==
Ian Mackenzie-Kerr was born and died in London, and was the son of a hotel manager. He was educated at Bryanston School in Dorset, where he developed his interest in art and drama under the leadership of the headmaster, Thorold Coade. He undertook National Service in Cyprus as an intelligence officer monitoring Arabic language broadcasts. In 1950, he started four years at Goldsmiths College, University of London, and was inspired enough to attend the Festival of Britain on the South Bank twice in 1951. He then moved to the Royal College of Art (1954–57), where he was taught about illustration by Edward Ardizzone and Edward Bawden.

Early on in his publishing career, with his theatrical background, he was offered Peter Cook's role in Beyond the Fringe on the tour of Australia.

When Mackenzie-Kerr joined Thames & Hudson in 1957, the art department was almost non-existent. Previously, illustrations in T&H books had been badly implemented, with poor colour reproduction. Mackenzie-Kerr transformed the situation for the company.

In 1962, Nikolaus Pevsner persuaded Mackenzie-Kerr to become designer and joint editor of the Victorian Society Annual with Ian Sutton, a colleague at Thames & Hudson. He produced the drawings for Strong Points by Roy Strong. Mackenzie-Kerr has featured in books about book design, being very adaptable as the technology of book design changed during his career.
