= Dugout canoe =

Boat made from a hollowed tree

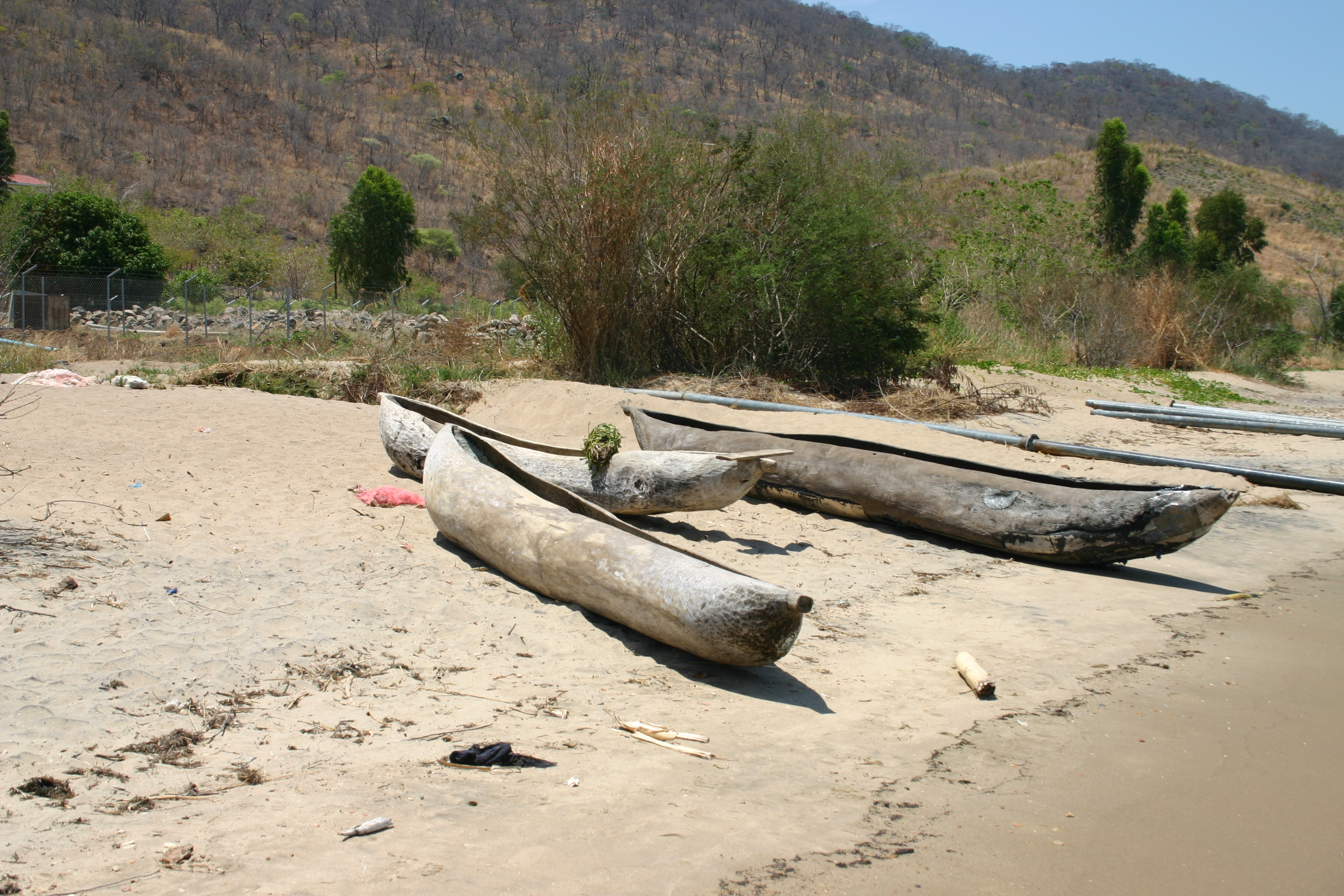
Dugouts on the shore of Lake Malawi

A dugout canoe or simply dugout is a boat made from a hollowed-out tree. Other names for this type of boat are logboat and monoxylon. Monoxylon (μονόξυλον) (pl: monoxyla) is Greek – mono- (single) + ξύλον xylon (tree) – and is mostly used in classic Greek texts. In German, they are called Einbaum ("one tree" in English). Some pirogues are also constructed in this manner.

Dugouts are the oldest boat type archaeologists have found, dating back about 8,000 years to the Neolithic Stone Age. This is probably because they are made of massive pieces of wood, which tend to preserve better than others, such as bark canoes.

== Construction ==
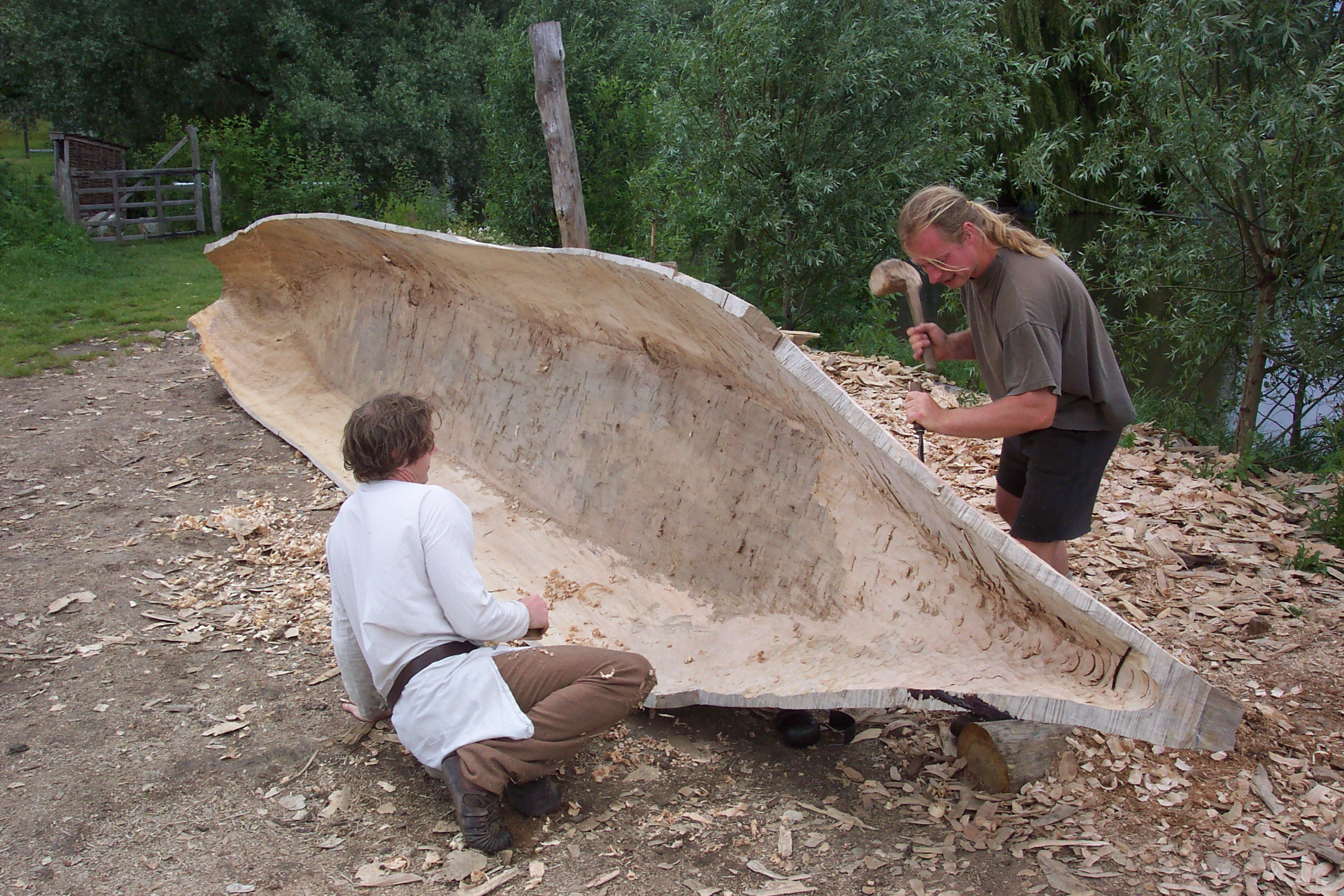
Building a seagoing dugout. The sides have likely been heated and bent outward.

Construction of a dugout begins with the selection of a log of suitable dimensions. Sufficient wood must be removed to make the vessel relatively light in weight and buoyant, yet still strong enough to support the crew and cargo. Specific types of wood were often preferred based on their strength, durability, and density. The shape of the boat is then fashioned to minimize drag, with sharp ends at the bow and stern.

First, the bark is removed from the exterior. Before the appearance of metal tools, dugouts were hollowed out using controlled fires. The burnt wood was then removed using an adze. Another method using tools is to chop out parallel notches across the interior span of the wood, then split out and remove the wood from between the notches. Once hollowed out, the interior was dressed and smoothed out with a knife or adze.

More primitive designs keep the tree's original dimensions, with a round bottom. However, it is possible to carefully steam the sides of the hollow log until they are pliable, then bend to create a more flat-bottomed "boat" shape with a wider beam in the center.

For travel in the rougher waters of the ocean, dugouts can be fitted with outriggers. One or two smaller logs are mounted parallel to the main hull by long poles. In the case of two outriggers, one is mounted on either side of the hull.

== Africa ==
The Dufuna canoe from Nigeria is an 8000-year-old dugout, the oldest boat discovered in Africa, and is, by varying accounts, the second or third-oldest ship worldwide. The well-watered tropical rainforest and woodland regions of sub-Saharan Africa provide both the waterways and the trees for dugout canoes, which are commonplace from the Limpopo River basin in the south through East and Central Africa and across to West Africa. African teak is the timber favoured for their construction, though this comprises a number of different species, and is in short supply in some areas. Dugouts are paddled across deep lakes and rivers or punted through channels in swamps (see makoro or mtumbwi) or in shallow areas, and are used for transport, fishing, and hunting, including, in the past, the very dangerous hunting of hippopotamus. Dugouts are called pirogues in Francophone areas of Africa.

A Nok sculpture portrays two individuals, along with their goods, in a dugout canoe. Both of the anthropomorphic figures in the watercraft are paddling. The Nok terracotta depiction of a dugout canoe may indicate that Nok people utilized dugout canoes to transport cargo, along tributaries (e.g., Gurara River) of the Niger River, and exchanged them in a regional trade network. The Nok terracotta depiction of a figure with a seashell on its head may indicate that the span of these riverine trade routes may have extended to the Atlantic Coast. In the maritime history of Africa, there is the earlier Dufuna canoe, which was constructed approximately 8000 years ago in the northern region of Nigeria; as the second earliest form of water vessel known in Sub-Saharan Africa, the Nok terracotta depiction of a dugout canoe was created in the central region of Nigeria during the first millennium BCE.

The engineering and methodology (e.g., cultural valuations, use of iron tools) used in the construction of West African dugout canoes (e.g., rounded point sterns and pointed bows with 15° - 50° angle above water surface, increased stability via partly rounded or flat base, v-shaped hull, shallow draft for sailing water depths less than one foot, occasionally spanning more than one hundred feet in length) contributed to the capability of the canoes to be able to persist and navigate throughout the interconnected river system that connected the Benue River, Gambia River, Niger River, and Senegal River as well as Lake Chad; this river system connected diverse sources of water (e.g., lakes, rivers, seas, streams) and ecological zones (e.g., Sahara, Sahel, Savanna), and allowed for the transport of people, information, and economic goods along riverine trade networks that connect various locations (e.g., Bamako, Djenne, Gao, Mopti, Segou, Timbuktu) throughout West Africa and North Africa. The knowledge and understanding (e.g., hydrography, marine geography, how canoe navigation is affected by the depth of the water, tides in the ocean, currents, and winds) of West African canoers facilitated the skillful navigation of various channels of the regional river system, while engaging in activities such as trade and fishing. The construction schema for West African dugout canoes were also used among canoes in the Americas constructed by the African diaspora. The sacredness of canoe-making is expressed in a proverb from Senegambia: "The blood of kings and the tears of the canoe-maker are sacred things which must not touch the ground." In addition to possessing economic value, West African dugout canoes also possessed a sociocultural and psychospiritual value.

In 1735 CE, John Atkins observed: "Canoos are what used through the whole Coast for transporting Men and Goods." European rowboats, which frequently capsized, were able to be outmaneuvered and outperformed in terms of speed by West African dugout canoes. Barbot stated, regarding West African canoers and West African dugout canoes, the "speed with which these people generally make these boats travel is beyond belief." Alvise da Cadamosto also observed how "effortlessly" Portuguese caravels were outperformed by Gambian dugout canoes. The skill of Kru canoers to be able to navigate the challenging conditions of the sea was also observed by Charles Thomas.

Amid the 1590s CE, Komenda and Takoradi in Ghana served as production areas for dugout canoes made by the Ahanta people. By 1679 CE, Barbot observed Takoradi to be "a major canoe-producing center, crafting dugouts capable of carrying up to eight tons." Between the 17th century CE and 18th century CE, a production area and/or marketplace of dugout canoes was in Shama, which later became only a marketplace on Supome Island. Amid the 1660s CE, in addition to other local canoers manufacturing dugout canoes, the Fetu people were observed by Muller as having bought dugout canoes that were made by the Ahanta people.

West Africans (e.g., Ghana, Ivory Coast, Liberia, Senegal) and western Central Africans (e.g., Cameroon) independently developed the skill of surfing. Amid the 1640s CE, Michael Hemmersam provided an account of surfing in the Gold Coast: "the parents 'tie their children to boards and throw them into the water.'" In 1679 CE, Barbot provided an account of surfing among Elmina children in Ghana: "children at Elmina learned "to swim, on bits of boards, or small bundles of rushes, fasten'd under their stomachs, which is a good diversion to the spectators." James Alexander provided an account of surfing in Accra, Ghana in 1834 CE: "From the beach, meanwhile, might be seen boys swimming into the sea, with light boards under their stomachs. They waited for a surf; and came rolling like a cloud on top of it. But I was told that sharks occasionally dart in behind the rocks and 'yam' them." Thomas Hutchinson provided an account of surfing in southern Cameroon in 1861: "Fishermen rode small dugouts 'no more than six feet in length, fourteen to sixteen inches in width, and from four to six inches in depth.'"

== Asia ==
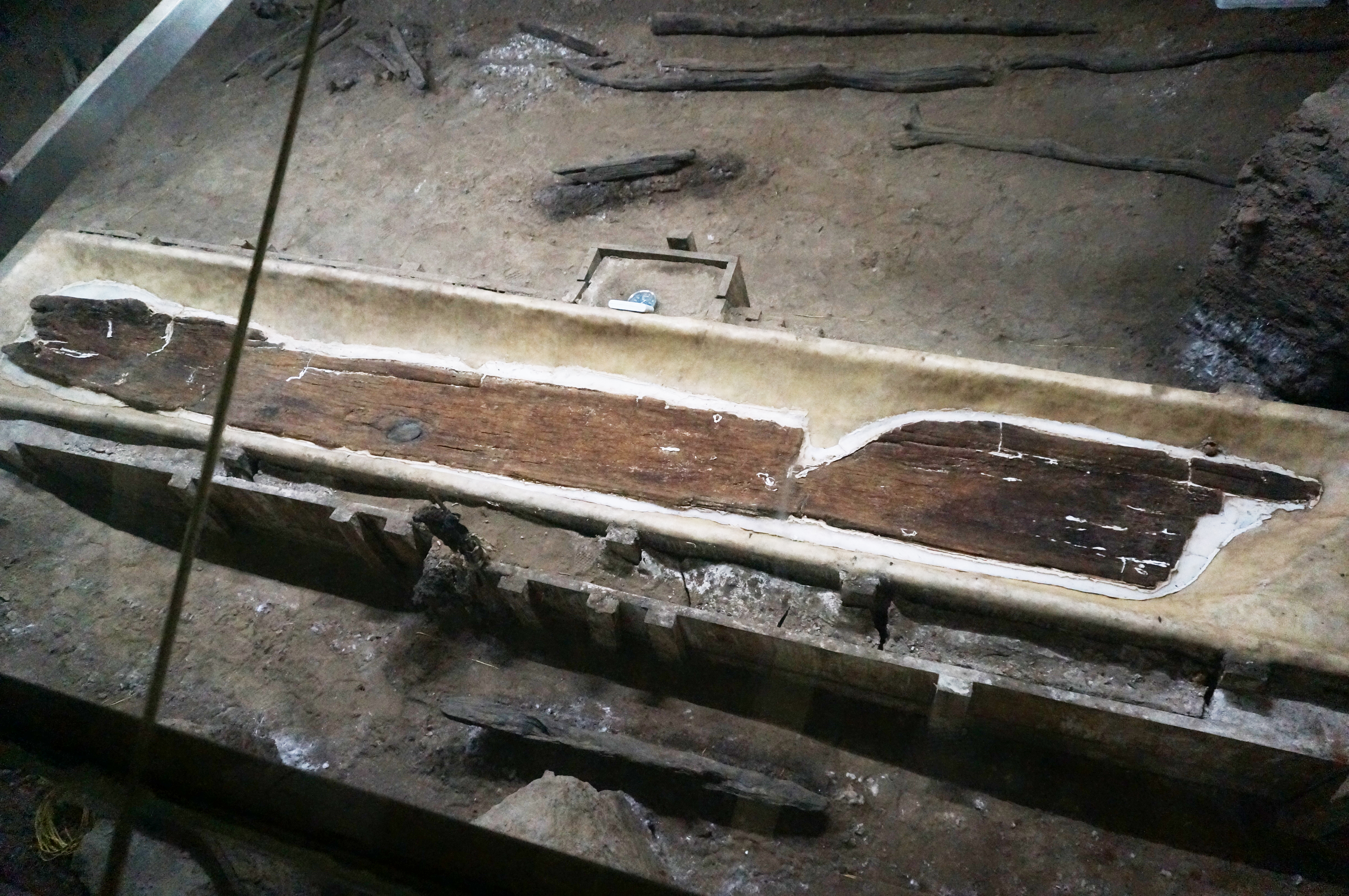
Remains of an 8000-year-old dugout excavated in China

An 8000-year-old dugout canoe was found by archaeologists in Kuahuqiao, Zhejiang Province, in east China. This is the earliest canoe found in Asia.

The Moken, an ethnic group that lives in Myanmar's Mergui Archipelago and the north of Thailand as sea nomads, still builds and uses dugout canoes. According to the Moken's accounts of their people's origin, a mythical queen punished the forbidden love of their ancestral forefather for his sister-in-law by banishing him and his descendants to life on sea in dugout canoes with indentations fore and aft ("a mouth that eats and a rear that defecates"), symbolizing the unending cycle of ingestion, digestion and evacuation.

A centuries-old unfinished dugout boat, a big banca (five tons, measuring 12 meters (39 ft) by 2 meters (6.6 ft) by 1.5 meters (4.9 ft)) was accidentally retrieved in November 2010 by Mayor Ricardo Revita at Barangay Casanicolasan, Rosales, Pangasinan, Philippines, in Lagasit River, near Agno River. It is now on display in front of the Municipal Town Hall.

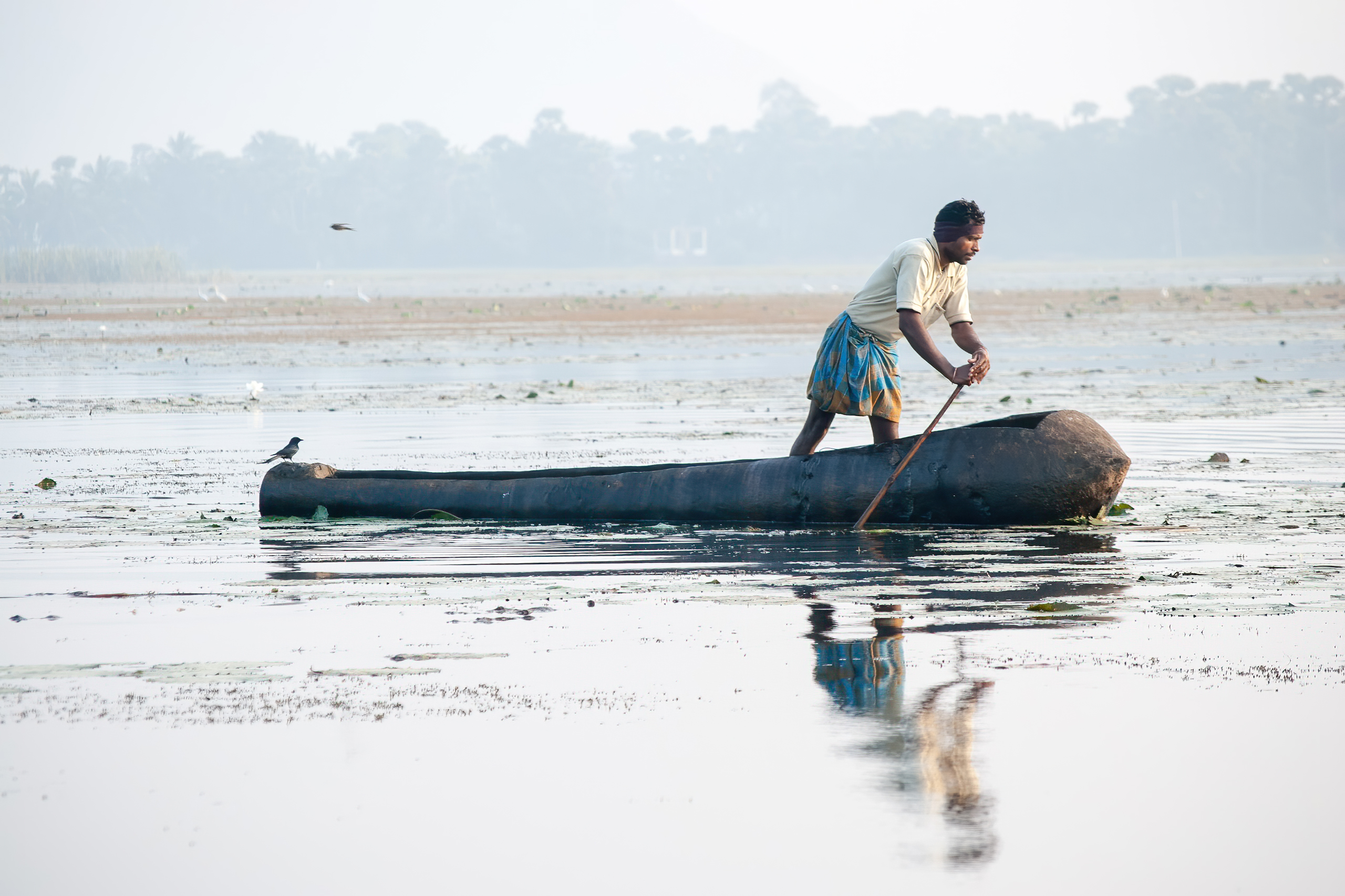
Fisherman in Kondakarla Ava

Dugout canoes are one of the most used traditional fishing vessels in India. Forest Department at Kolleru Lake held various contests with the dugout canoe among local fishing communities. In an era where the traditional canoe faces extinction, the boat race saw 22 participants. They also noted that within two decades, there were over 1,000 dugout canoes employed for fishing in the lake. Now, their count has dwindled to less than a hundred.

== Europe ==
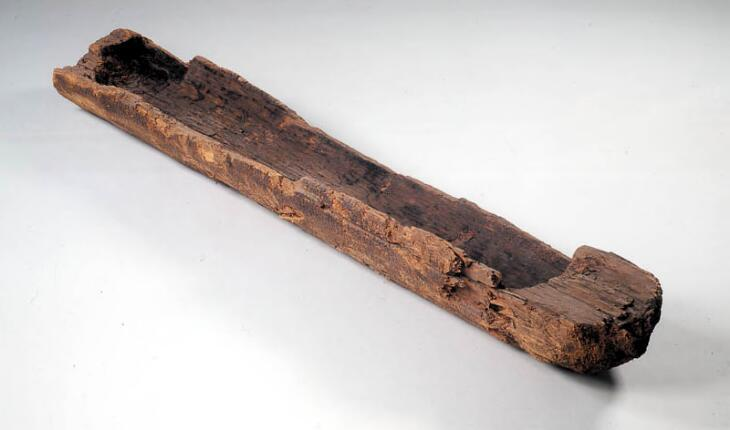
The Pesse canoe is the world's oldest known dugout

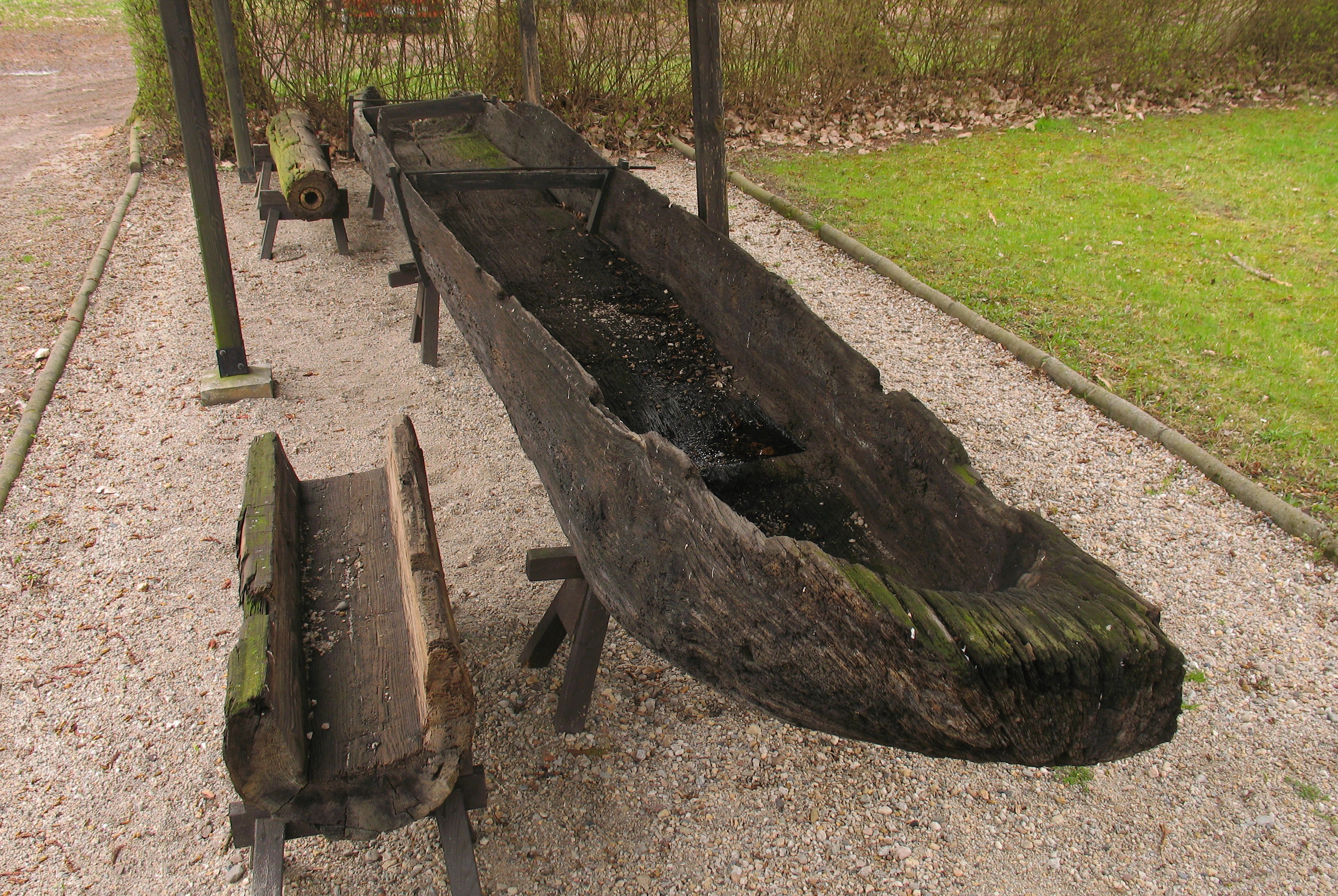
Slavic dugout from the 10th century

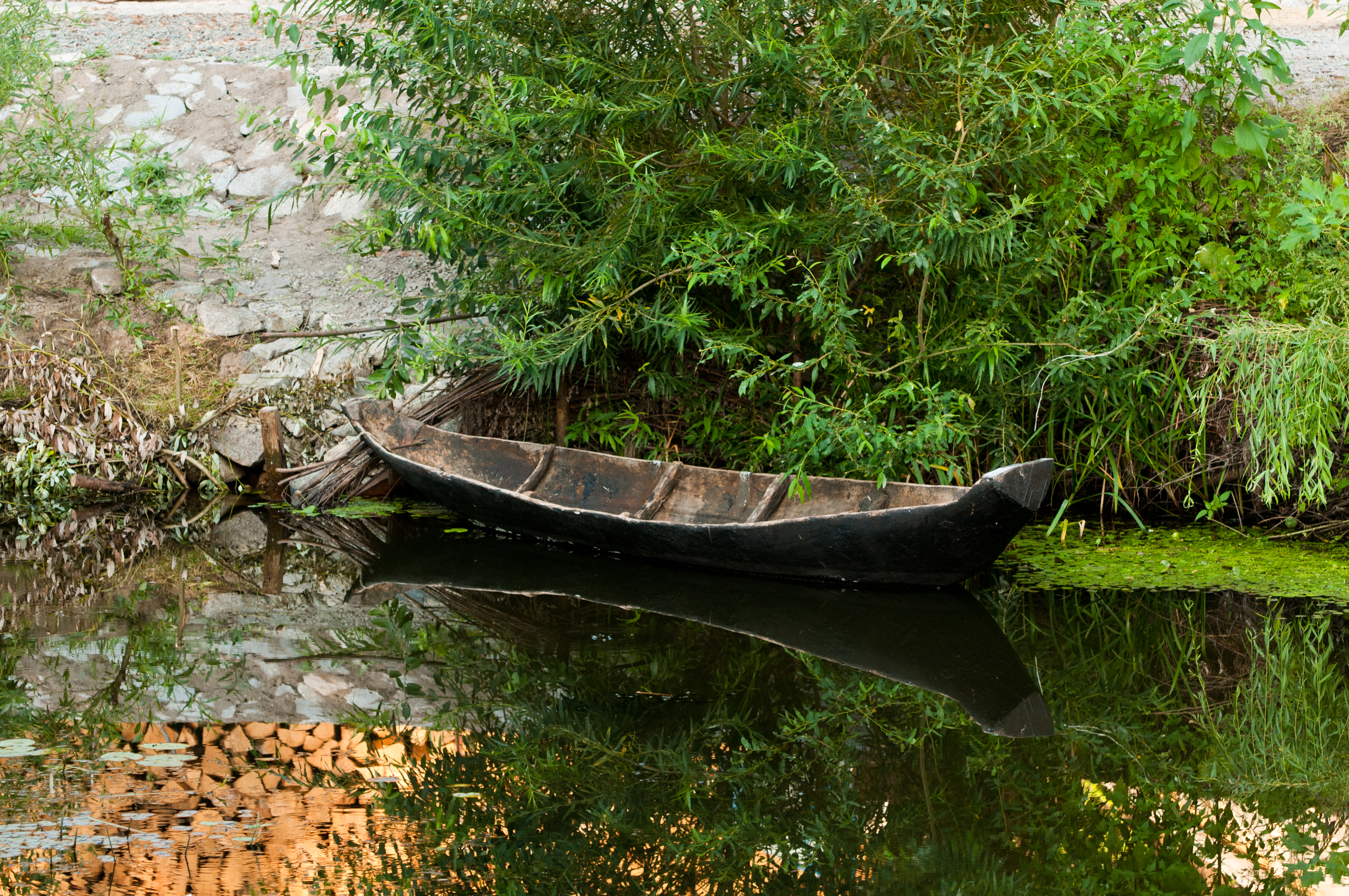
Ukrainian dugout (dowbanka) from the end of the 19th century

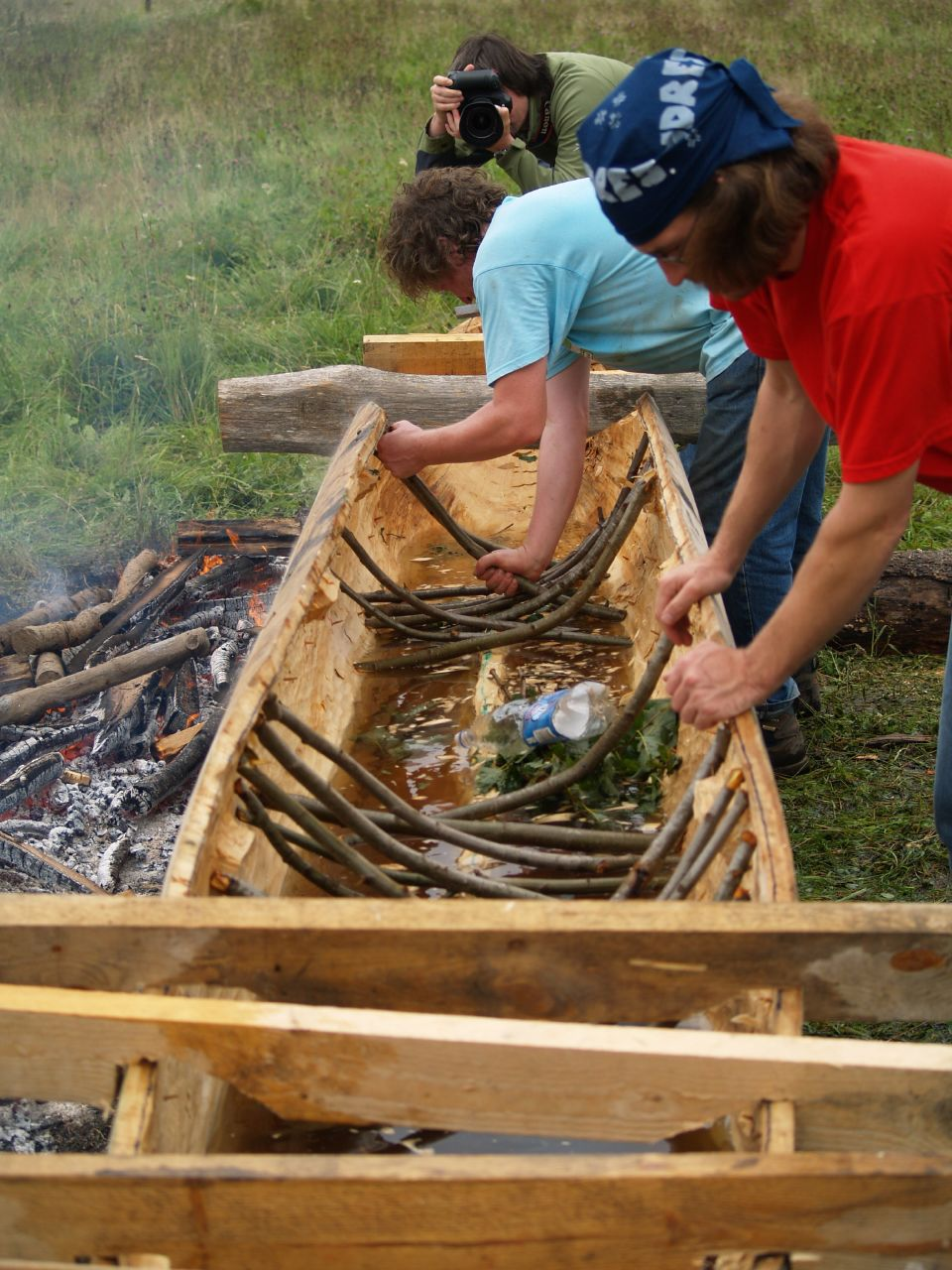
Building a dugout in Estonia

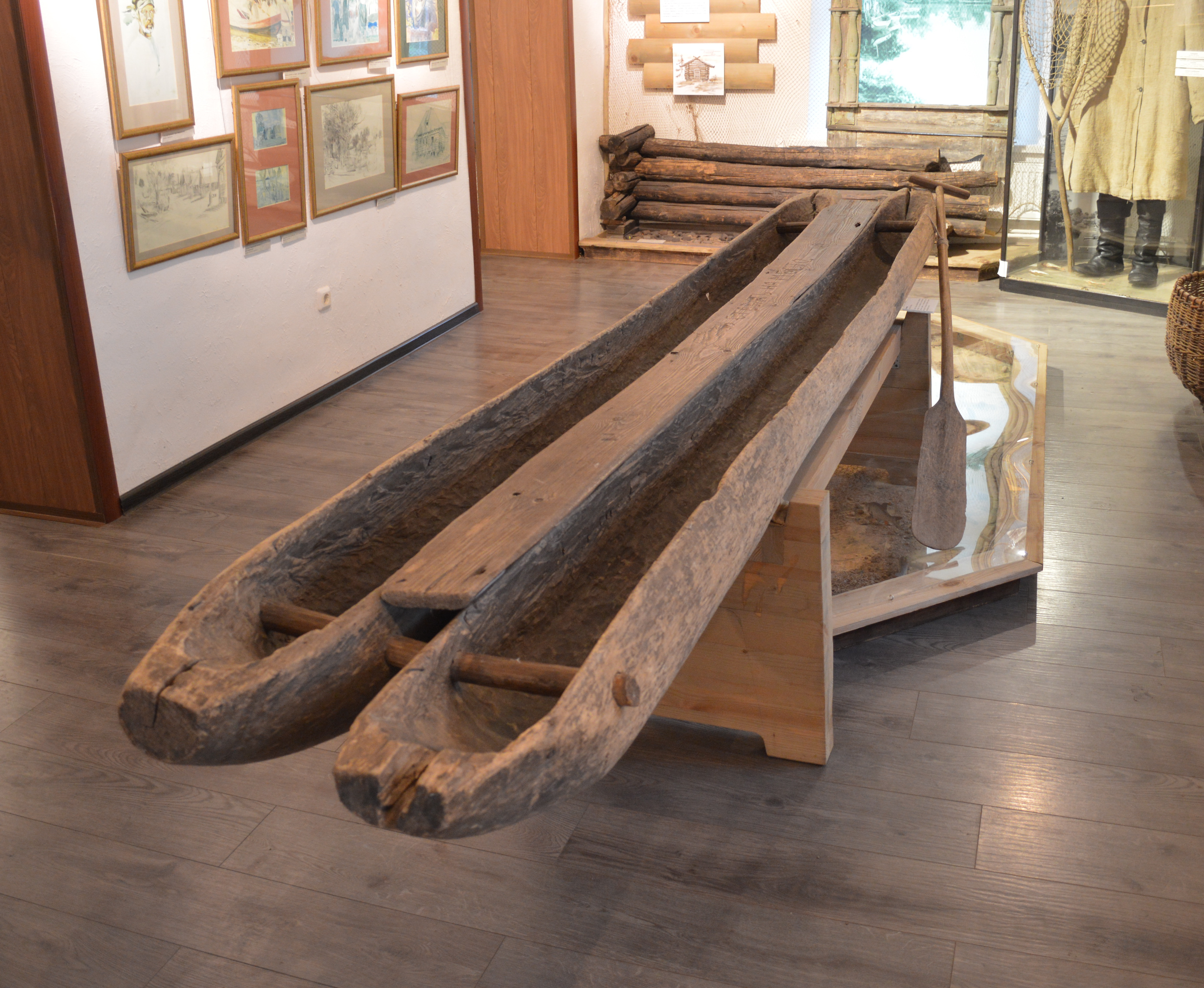
Twin dugout, Russia, late 19th century

In ancient Europe many dugouts were made from linden wood, for several reasons. First, linden trees were abundant in the Paleolithic after the melting of the Weichselian glaciation and readily available. Secondly, linden grew to be one of the tallest trees in the forests of the time, making it easier to build longer boats. Linden wood also lends itself well to carving and doesn't split or crack easily. It is also lighter than most other tree types in European old-growth forests, and for this reason, boats made from linden wood have a better cargo capacity and are easier to carry.

The Pesse canoe, found in the Netherlands, is a dugout which is believed to be the world's oldest boat, carbon dated to between 8040 BCE and 7510 BCE. Other dugouts discovered in the Netherlands include two in the province of North Holland: in 2003, near Uitgeest, dated at 617-600 BC; and in 2007, near Den Oever, dated at 3300-3000 BC.

Dugouts have also been found in Germany. In German, the craft is known as Einbaum (one-tree). In the old Hanseatic town of Stralsund, three log-boats were excavated in 2002. Two of the boats were around 7,000 years old and are the oldest boats found in the Baltic area. The third boat (6,000 years old) was 12 meters (39 ft) long and holds the record as the longest dugout in the region. The finds have partly deteriorated due to poor storage conditions.

In 1991, remains of a linden wood log-boat of nearly 6 meters (20 ft) were found at Männedorf-Strandbad in Switzerland at Lake Zürich. The boat has since been dated to be 6,500 years old.

In 1902 an oak logboat over 15 meters (49 ft) long and 1 meter (3.3 ft) wide, was found at Addergoole Bog, Lurgan, County Galway, Ireland, and delivered to the National Museum of Ireland. The Lurgan boat radiocarbon date was 3940 ± 25 BP. The boat has holes suggesting that it had an outrigger or was joined to another boat.

In 2012, at Parc Glyndwr, Monmouth, Monmouthshire, Wales, an excavation by the Monmouth Archaeological Society, revealed three ditches suggesting a Neolithic dugout trimaran of similar length to the Lurgan log boat, carbon dated to 3700±35 BP.

De Administrando Imperio details how the Slavs built monoxyla that they sold to Rus' in Kiev. These boats were then used against the Byzantine Empire during the Rus'–Byzantine Wars of the 9th and 10th centuries. They used dugouts to attack Constantinople and to withdraw into their lands with bewildering speed and mobility. Hence, the name of Δρομίται ("people on the run") applied to the Rus in some Byzantine sources. The monoxyla were often accompanied by larger galleys, that served as command and control centres. Each Slavic dugout could hold from 40 to 70 warriors.

The Cossacks of the Zaporozhian Host were also renowned for their artful use of dugouts, which issued from the Dnieper to raid the shores of the Black Sea in the 16th and 17th centuries. Using small, shallow-draft, and highly maneuverable galleys known as chaiky, they moved swiftly across the Black Sea. According to the Cossacks' own records, these vessels, carrying a 50 to 70 man crew, could reach the coast of Anatolia from the mouth of the Dnieper River in forty hours.

More than 40 pre-historic log-boats have been found in the Czech Republic. The latest discovery was in 1999 of a 10 meters (33 ft) long log-boat in Mohelnice. It was cut out of a single oak log and has a width of 1.05 meters (3.4 ft). The log-boat has been dated to around 1000 BC and is kept at the Mohelnice Museum (Museum of National History). Geographically, Czech log-boat sites and remains are clustered along the Elbe and Morava rivers.

Poland is known for so-called Lewin-type log-boats, found at Lewin Brzeski, Koźle and Roszowicki Las accordingly, and associated with the Przeworsk culture in the early centuries CE. Lewin logboats are characterized by a square or trapezoidal cross-section, rectangular hull-ends and low height of the sides in relation to vessel length. In addition, nearly all the Lewin-type boats have a single hole in the bow and two at the stern. The low height is a result of the parent log being split lengthwise in half, in order to obtain two identical timbers from a single trunk. The advantage lies in the resulting identical twin hulls, which are then joined to form a double-hulled raft. The paired hulls were joined by transverse poles, which did not go through the holes in the platform ends but were fastened to the top walls or in special grooves at the hull ends. These vessels were typically 7 meters (23 ft)–12 meters (39 ft) in length, and the largest of them could carry up to 1.5 tons of cargo because of the special design.

Many pre-historic dugout boats have been found in Scandinavia. These boats were used for transport on calmer bodies of water, fishing and maybe occasionally for whaling and sealing. Dugouts require no metal parts, and were common amongst the Stone Age people in Northern Europe until large trees suitable for making this type of watercraft became scarce. Length was limited to the size of trees in the old-growth forests—up to 12 metres (39 ft) in length. In Denmark in 2001, and some years prior to that, a few dugout canoes of linden wood, were unearthed in a large-scale archaeological excavation project in Egådalen, north of Aarhus. They have been carbon dated to the years 5210-4910 BCE and they are the oldest known boats in Northern Europe. In Scandinavia, later models increased freeboard (and seaworthiness) by lashing additional boards to the side of the dugout. Eventually, the dugout portion was reduced to a solid keel, and the lashed boards on the sides became a lapstrake hull.

In the United Kingdom, two log boats were discovered in Newport, Shropshire, and are now on display at Harper Adams University Newport. The Iron Age residents of Great Britain, were known to have used logboats for fishing and basic trade. In 1964, a logboat was uncovered in Poole Harbour, Dorset. The Poole Logboat dated to 300 BC, was large enough to accommodate 18 people and was constructed from a giant oak tree. It is currently located in the Poole Museum. An even older logboat (the Hanson log boat) was unearthed in 1998 in Shardlow south of Derby. It has been dated to the Bronze Ages around 1500 BCE and is now exhibited at Derby Museum and Art Gallery. There was another pre-historic boat at the same location, but it was buried in situ.

In Northern Europe, the tradition of making dugout canoes survived into the 20th and 21st centuries in Estonia, where seasonal floods in Soomaa, a 390 square kilometers (150 sq mi) wilderness area, make conventional means of transportation impossible. In recent decades, a new surge of interest in crafting dugouts (Estonian haabjas) has revitalized the ancient tradition. In December 2021 dugout boat culture of Estonia's Soomaa region was added to UNESCO's Intangible Cultural Heritage list.

== The Americas ==
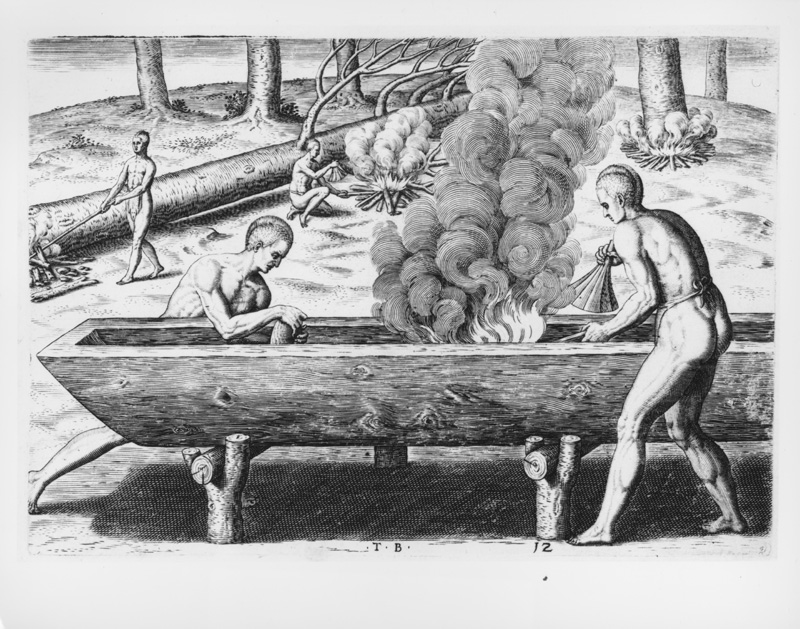
Native Americans making a dugout canoe, 1590

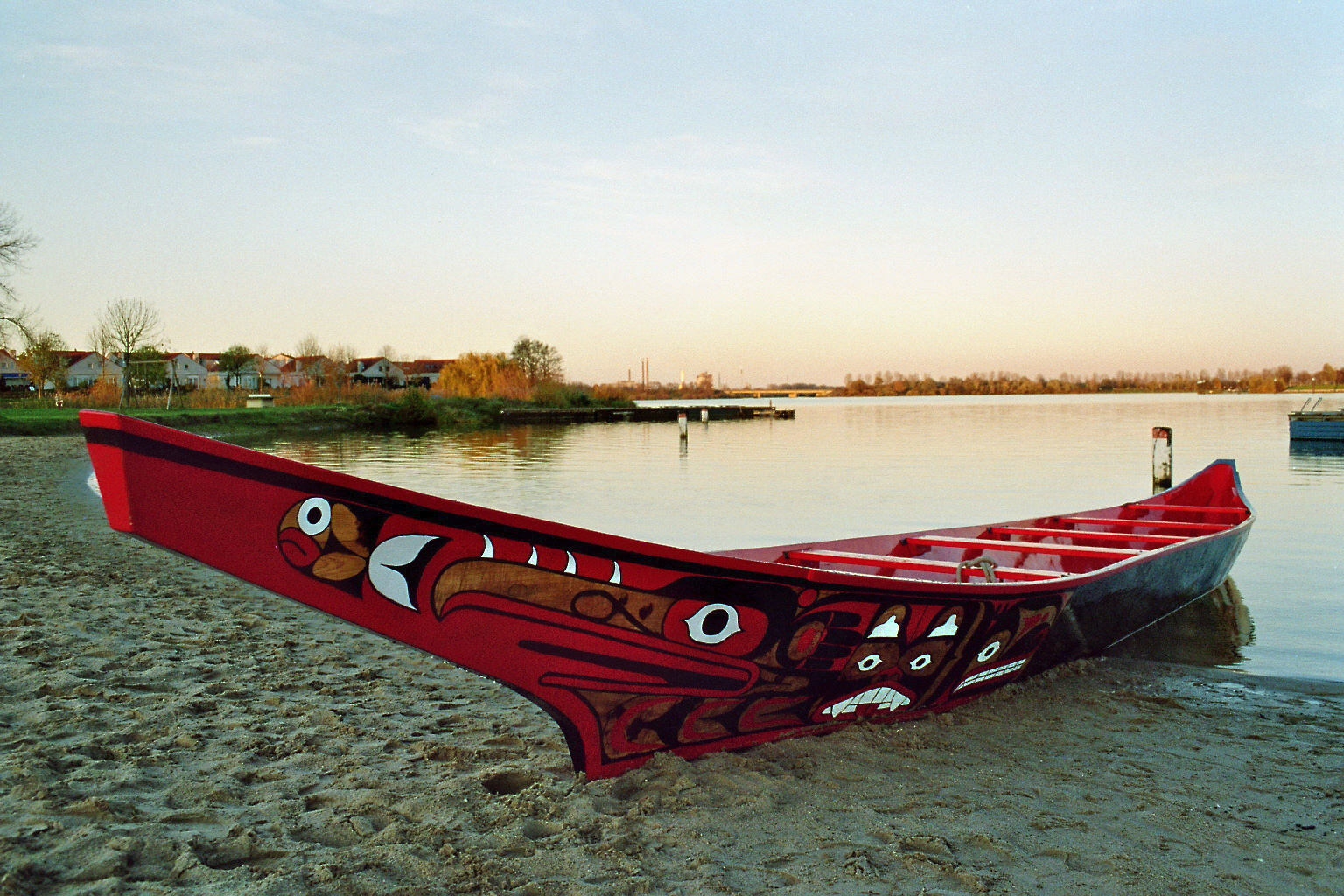
Contemporary seagoing dugout from the Pacific Northwest

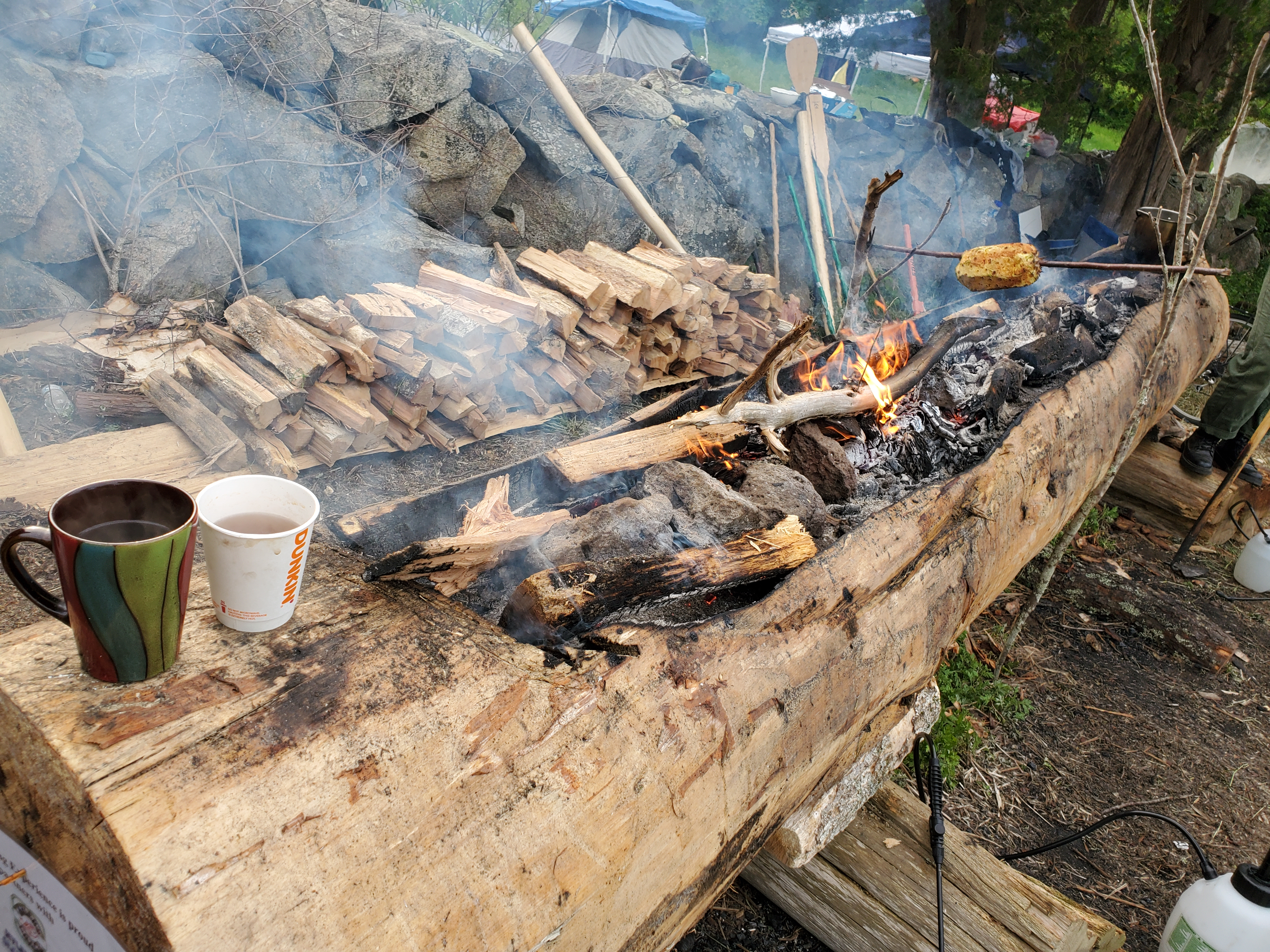
A contemporary Algonquian dugout canoe, or mishoon, being burned out.

Dugout canoes were constructed by indigenous people throughout the Americas, where suitable logs were available.

The Native Americans of the Pacific Northwest were and are still very skilled at crafting wood. Best known for totem poles up to 24 meters (80 ft) tall, they also construct dugout canoes over 18 meters (60 ft) long for everyday use and ceremonial purposes. In the state of Washington, dugout canoes are traditionally made from huge cedar logs (such as Pacific red cedar) for ocean travelers, while natives around smaller rivers use spruce logs. Cedar logs have a resilience in salt water much greater than spruce.

In the Northeast, dugout canoes called mishoon or mishoonash were burned over several days and scraped out to create a boat fit for sailing or rowing. Trees such as pine or oak were cut down for burning for their size and controllable burn. The tradition lives on today, with events celebrating the burning and launch of a mishoon across various tribes in the Northeastern Woodlands. Traditionally, when the sailing and fishing season was finished, the boat would be filled with rocks and sunk into a body of water until the next year. Over the past century, multiple mishoonash have been found still sunk in waterways, preserved in time.

In 1978, Geordie Tocher and two companions sailed a dugout canoe (the Orenda II), based on Haida designs (but with sails), from Vancouver, British Columbia, Canada to Hawaiʻi. The dugout was 40-foot (12 m) long, made of Douglas fir, and weighed 3.5-short-ton (3.2 t). The mission was launched to add credibility to stories that the Haida had travelled to Hawaiʻi in ancient times. Altogether, the group ventured some 7,242 kilometres (4,500 mi) after two months at sea.

== Oceania ==
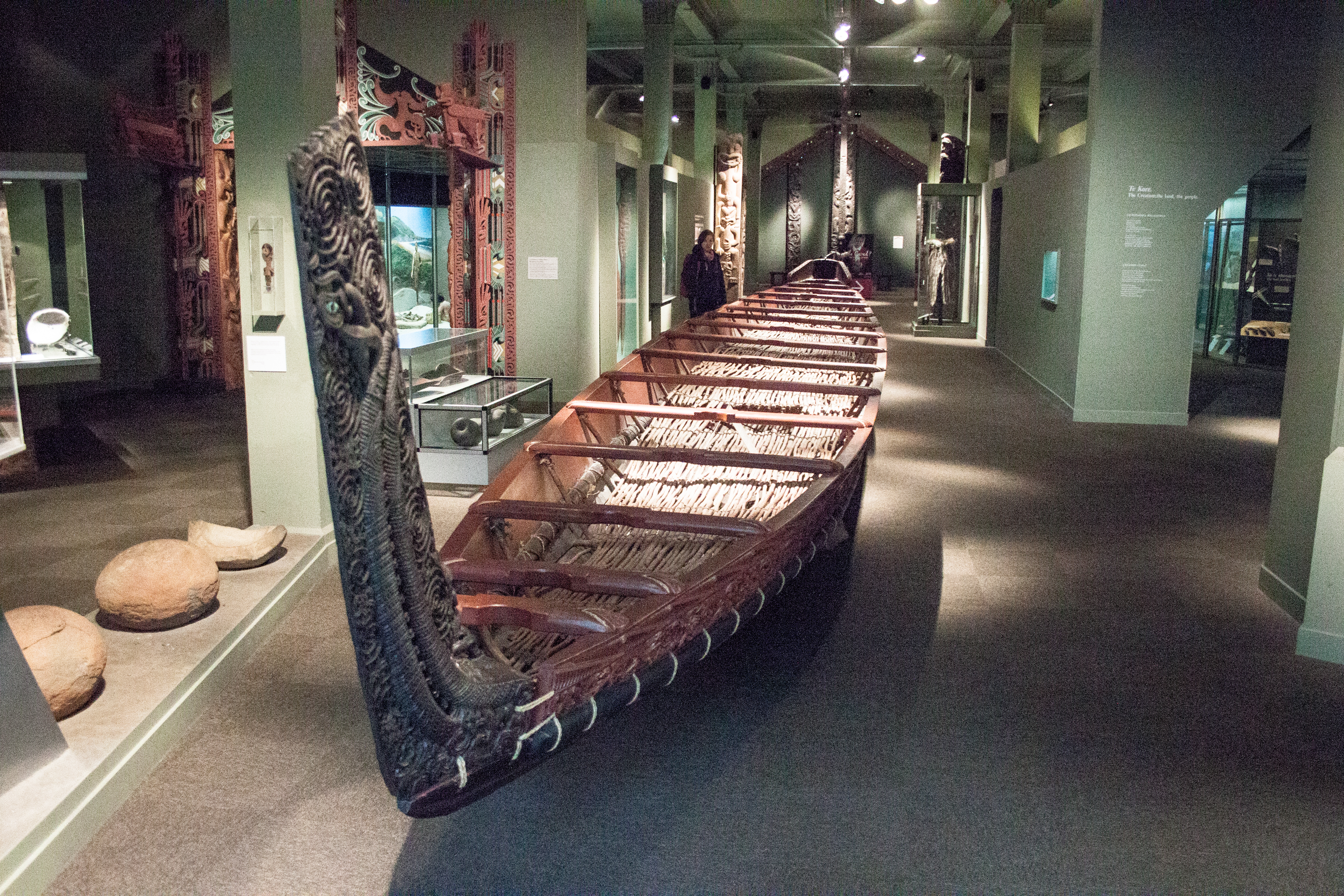
Māori waka canoe in a museum

=== Pacific Islands ===
The Pacific Ocean has been the nursery for many different forms of dugout sailing craft. They differ in their sail plan (i.e., crab-claw or half-crab-claw, Latin, or triangular), hull formats (single, double, catamaran or proa), the absence or presence of a beam (a bridge for a double hull). Hull shapes and end forms vary greatly. Masts can "be right or made of double spars." Hulls can be constructed by assembling boards or digging out tree trunks. Intended use (fish, war, sea voyage) and geographical features (beach, lagoon, reefs) are reflected in the design. Importantly, there is an important dividing line: some craft use a tacking rig; others "shunt" that is change tack "by reversing the sail from one end of the hull to the other." Tacking rigs are similar to those seen in most parts of the world, but shunting rigs change tack by reversing the sail from one end of the hull to the other and sailing in the opposite direction (the "Pushmi-pullyu" of the sailing world).

In the Pacific Islands, dugout canoes are very large, made from whole mature trees and fitted with outriggers for increased stability in the ocean, and were once used for long-distance travel.

=== New Zealand ===
The very large waka is used by Māori people, who came to New Zealand probably from East Polynesia in about 1280. Such vessels carried 40 to 80 warriors in calm sheltered coastal waters or rivers. It is believed that trans-ocean voyages were made in Polynesian catamarans and one hull, carbon-dated to about 1400, was found in New Zealand in 2011. In New Zealand smaller waka were made from a single log, often totara, because of its lightness, strength and resistance to rotting. Larger waka were made of about seven parts lashed together with flax rope. All waka are characterized by very low freeboard. In Hawaiʻi, waʻa (canoes) are traditionally manufactured from the trunk of the koa tree. They typically carry a crew of six: one steersman and five paddlers.

=== Australasia ===
The Australian Aboriginal people began using dugout canoes from around 1640 in coastal regions of northern Australia. They were brought by Buginese fishers of sea cucumbers, known as trepangers, from Makassar in South Sulawesi. In Arnhem Land, dugout canoes are used by the local Yolngu people, called lipalipa or lippa-lippa.

Torres Strait Islander people used double outriggers, unique to their area, and evidence suggests their use dates back at least 2,500 years. They could be up to 21 metres (69 ft) long and could sail across networks as far as 700–800 kilometres (430–500 mi) and carry up to 12 people.

In the mid-1950s, Australian bushman Michael 'Tarzan' Fomenko grew "obsessed with building and sailing dugout canoes" in northern Queensland, and in the late 1950s, paddled one of them 600 kilometres across the Torres Strait from Cooktown to Merauke, then part of Dutch New Guinea.

=== Solomon Islanders ===
The Solomon Islanders have used and continue to use dugout canoes to travel between islands. In World War II these were used during the Japanese occupation - with their small visual and noise signatures these were among the smallest boats used by the Allied forces in World War II. After the sinking of PT-109, Biuku Gasa reached the shipwrecked John F. Kennedy by dugout.

== See also ==
- Log canoe
- Traditional fishing boat
- Tomol, Chumash plank-built boat
