= Nicholas Warren =

The Hon. Mr Justice Warren
- Royal coat of arms of the United Kingdom

Justice of the High Court
- Incumbent
- Assumed office 2005

Personal details
- Born: 20 May 1949 (age 77)
- Education: University College, Oxford

Sir Nicholas Roger Warren (born 20 May 1949), styled The Hon. Mr Justice Warren, is a judge of the High Court of England and Wales.

He was educated at Bryanston School and University College, Oxford.

He was called to the bar at Middle Temple in 1972 and made a bencher there in 2001. He was made a QC in 1993, recorder 1999 to 2005, and judge of the High Court of Justice (Chancery Division) since 2005.
