= Roderick Kennedy =

English operatic bass

Roderick Kennedy (born Birmingham, 7 May 1951) is an English operatic bass who appeared at the major opera houses in the UK and in Europe, recording a number of supporting roles in his repertoire. Since 2004 he has been the artistic director of Dorset Opera Festival.

== Career ==
From 1969 to 1974 Kennedy was an advertising executive; he studied at the Guildhall School of Music and Drama, and took private lessons with Otakar Kraus. An early principal role was as Banquo in a Brunel University production of Macbeth (Paris version) in February 1976.

He was a member of the Royal Opera Chorus from 1975-78 and sang solos with them; his debut at Covent Garden was as a waiter in Der Rosenkavalier in November 1975, and sang regularly with them from the 1976-77 season to the 1980s. His many roles included Angelotti, Doctor Grenvil and Fasolt. He sang the Lieutenant in the premiere of Tippett's The Ice Break in July 1977. With the company he toured to La Scala Milan in 1976 and sang Angelotti and Sciaronne on the company's Far East tour in 1979.

He has sung at Glyndebourne roles such as Don Fernando (Fidelio, 1981), the Voice of Neptune (Idomeneo, 1983), Alidoro (La Cenerentola, 1983), Rocco (Fidelio, 1983), Theseus (A Midsummer Night's Dream, 1984), and Seneca (L'Incoronazione di Poppea, 1986). At English National Opera he sang the Podesta in The Thieving Magpie, the Tutor in Count Ory and Fasolt in Das Rheingold. For Scottish Opera from 1980 to 1987, Prince Gremin in Eugene Onegin, Colline in La bohème, Notte in Egisto, Pogner in The Mastersingers of Nuremberg and Sparafucile in Rigoletto. He also designed the new logo for the company in 1987.

When Kennedy appeared as King Philip in Don Carlos for Dorset Opera in 1984 he also designed the set. He appeared as the Doctor in Geraint Evans's production of Wozzeck at San Francisco Opera in 1981, having also sung the role in a David Alden production for Scottish Opera - one reviewer commenting that he had surely done nothing better on stage - under Simon Rattle. In Europe he appeared at the opera houses of Paris, Florence, Barcelona, Berlin and Vienna. He appeared at the English Bach Festival, as Pluton in Hippolyte et Aricie at Covent Garden and the Athens Festival, and as Le Grand Pontife in La Vestale at Wexford.

His Proms appearances include the Marquis in the first UK performance in modern times of the original 1862 version of La forza del destino (1981), Janáček's Glagolitic Mass (1982) and Lorenzo in Bellini's I Capuleti e i Montecchi (1988).

Kennedy became Artistic Director of Dorset Opera for its 2005 season, when the organization moved to a new home, Bryanston School in Blandford. He had previously sung in ten productions for the company over two decades and had lived with his family in Bournemouth for many years.

== Recordings ==
- Lucrezia Borgia - Donizetti (conductor Richard Bonynge), (Astolfo), Opus Arte DVD, 1980
- Robinson Crusoé - Offenbach (conductor Alun Francis), (Sir William Crusoe), Opera Rara 1981 (also at the Proms in 1980)
- Maria Padilla - Donizetti ((conductor Alun Francis), (Ramiro), Opera Rara 1981
- Patience - Sullivan (conductor Alexander Faris), (Major Murgatroyd), Universal DVD 1982
- Messiah - Handel (conductor Nikolaus Harnoncourt), Teldec 1983
- Idomeneo - Mozart (conductor Bernard Haitink), (the Voice), Philips 1983
- La Cenerentola - Rossini (conductor Donato Renzetti), (Alindoro), Warner 1983 (also at the Proms in 1983)
- The Immortal Hour - Boughton (conductor Alan G Melville), (Dalua), Hyperion 1984
- Ariane et Barbe-bleue - Dukas (conductor Gary Bertini) (Barbe-Bleue), Capriccio 1986
- Die Sieben Todsuenden - Weill (conductor Michael Tilson Thomas), CBS 1988
- Dialogue between Tom Filuter and his Man by Ned the Dog Stealer; Three Songs (Rio Grande, Theodore, A Long Time Ago) - Lord Berners, Heritage 2016
