= Mortar Wreck =

Medieval shipwreck near Dorset, England

Coordinates: 50°39′30″N 1°55′29″W

The Mortar Wreck is the name for a shipwreck located off the Dorset coast of England near the Poole Harbour, dated to the middle of the 13th century. It is the oldest protected shipwreck site in England with a hull still surviving. While the exact cause of its sinking is unknown, it is suspected that the weight of the cargo on the ship may have led to it. The site has been known since 1982, but it was not discovered to be a shipwreck until 2020. Artefacts recovered from the wreck were moved to a gallery in the Poole Museum in 2025.
