= Poole Logboat =

Iron Age logboat found in Dorset, England

Coordinates: 50.7125°N 1.9888°W

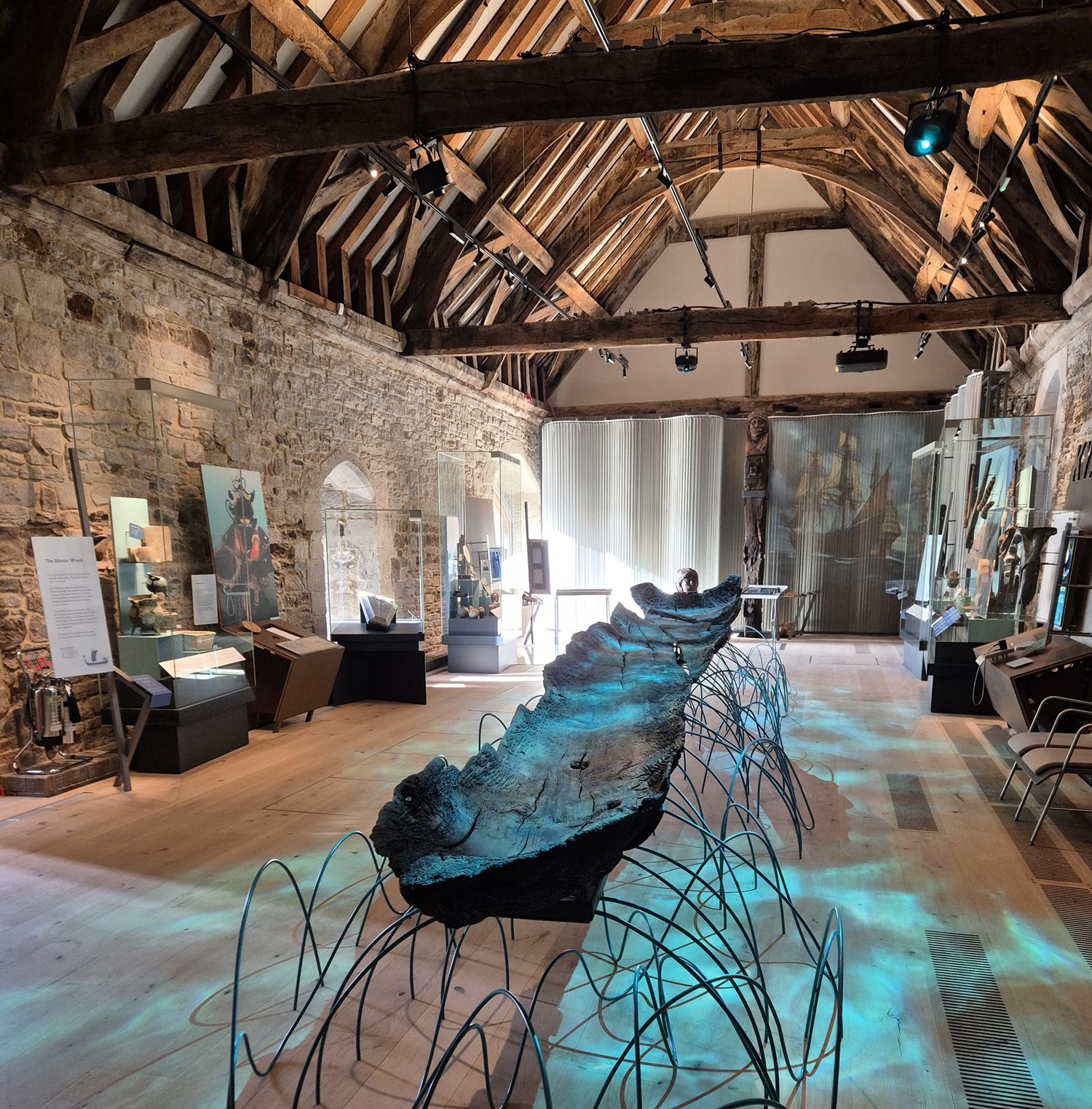
- The Poole Logboat made from a single oak tree is over 2,000 years old. It is currently in the Poole Museum.
- Material: Oak wood
- Size: length: 10 meters
- Created: c. 295 BC
- Discovered: 1964; Poole, England, United Kingdom

The Poole Logboat is an ancient logboat made from a single oak tree. It was excavated in the town of Poole, Dorset, England. The boat is over 2,200 years old and is estimated through carbon dating to have been constructed around 200–300 BCE, likely around 295 BC.

The Iron Age vessel was unearthed in 1964 during dredging work in Poole Harbour. The log boat, which could accommodate 18 people and is 10 metres (33 ft) long was based at Green Island in the harbour. After it was found, it was kept submerged in water for 30 years while archaeologists decided what to do with it. It was restored by members of York Archaeological Trust and dried for two years. The boat is on display in Poole Museum. In May 2023, the boat was removed into safe storage while the museum is under renovation.

The boat has been described as one of the finest examples in Western Europe.

As an internationally significant object, the logboat has been fully recorded digitally using 3D scanning.

The logboat is of a shell built design type that has a 'fitted transom added'. The boat has a reasonable degree of stability and seaworthiness. With a freeboard of 76 centimeters, research has determined the logboat could support the weight of up to 18 persons (weighing 60 kg) each.

== See also ==
- List of surviving ancient ships

== Bibliography ==
- McGrail, S (2014). Ancient boats in North-West Europe : the archaeology of water transport to AD 1500. Routledge. ISBN 978-0-5823-1975-2.
- Appleby, Catrina A.; Parham, David; Berry, Jessica (2019). The Poole Iron Age logboat. Oxford: Archaeopress Publishing. ISBN 978-1-7896-9144-3.
