= Bethan's Rock =

Small grey stone at Poole Museum

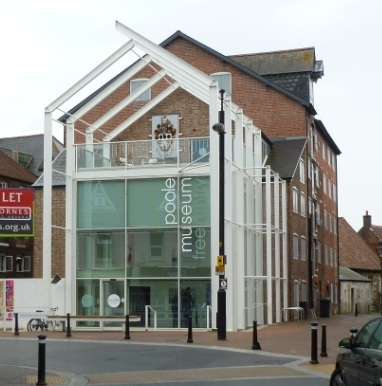
Bethan's Rock is displayed at Poole Museum (pictured).

Bethan's Rock is a small grey stone on display at Poole Museum in Poole, England. It was donated to the museum in 2019 by a five-year-old girl named Bethan, and it has since attracted significant attention on social media and become the museum's most famous object.

== Donation ==
On 23 August 2019, a five-year-old girl named Bethan and her mother visited the Poole Museum. Following a discussion with her mother regarding the function of museums, Bethan chose to donate her favourite rock, originally found on a beach by her grandmother and given to her. As she left the museum, Bethan approached the front desk and asked if they could place the stone behind glass and look after it so that everyone could see and enjoy it. Within weeks, the rock was placed on display in a glass case and labelled "Bethan's Rock – 2019". In an interview with BBC Radio Solent in 2025, Gary Edwards, Poole Museum's curator, described Bethan's donation as "a very simple, generous act". Writing in Archives and Records, Alex Orrmalm and Marek Tesar used Bethan's donation as an example of children's desire to archive objects from nature.

== Display ==
External image
- Bethan's Rock

Bethan's Rock is a small grey and white stone. It is displayed in a glass cabinet on the second floor of Poole Museum, alongside a printed note that recounts the circumstances of its donation. The museum's staff placed the rock in a cabinet in the same manner as other valuable artefacts in the museum's collection, and have described the object as highlighting that "treasures don't have to be rare" and that museums are about people and the deeper meaning connected to objects. Edwards stated that Bethan's Rock had become Poole Museum's most famous object and that it had enhanced the museum's audience across the world.

== Social media attention ==
Bethan's Rock gained widespread attention after photographs of its display were shared online. In October 2021, a post about the rock on the website Reddit received 112,000 upvotes. A later post received 189,000 likes in ten days after being shared on the Facebook page Wholesome Meets the Internet. In November 2021, the museum announced on Facebook that the rock was becoming an international phenomenon. Comments praised the museum for honouring Bethan's request and thanked her for sharing her favourite rock. Rebecca Rossiter, the museum's manager, stated that the rock had become "a bit legendary" among staff and visitors and suggested that its popularity may stem from the personal meaning it held for Bethan despite its ordinary appearance.

== See also ==
- List of individual rocks
