= Dorset Opera Festival =

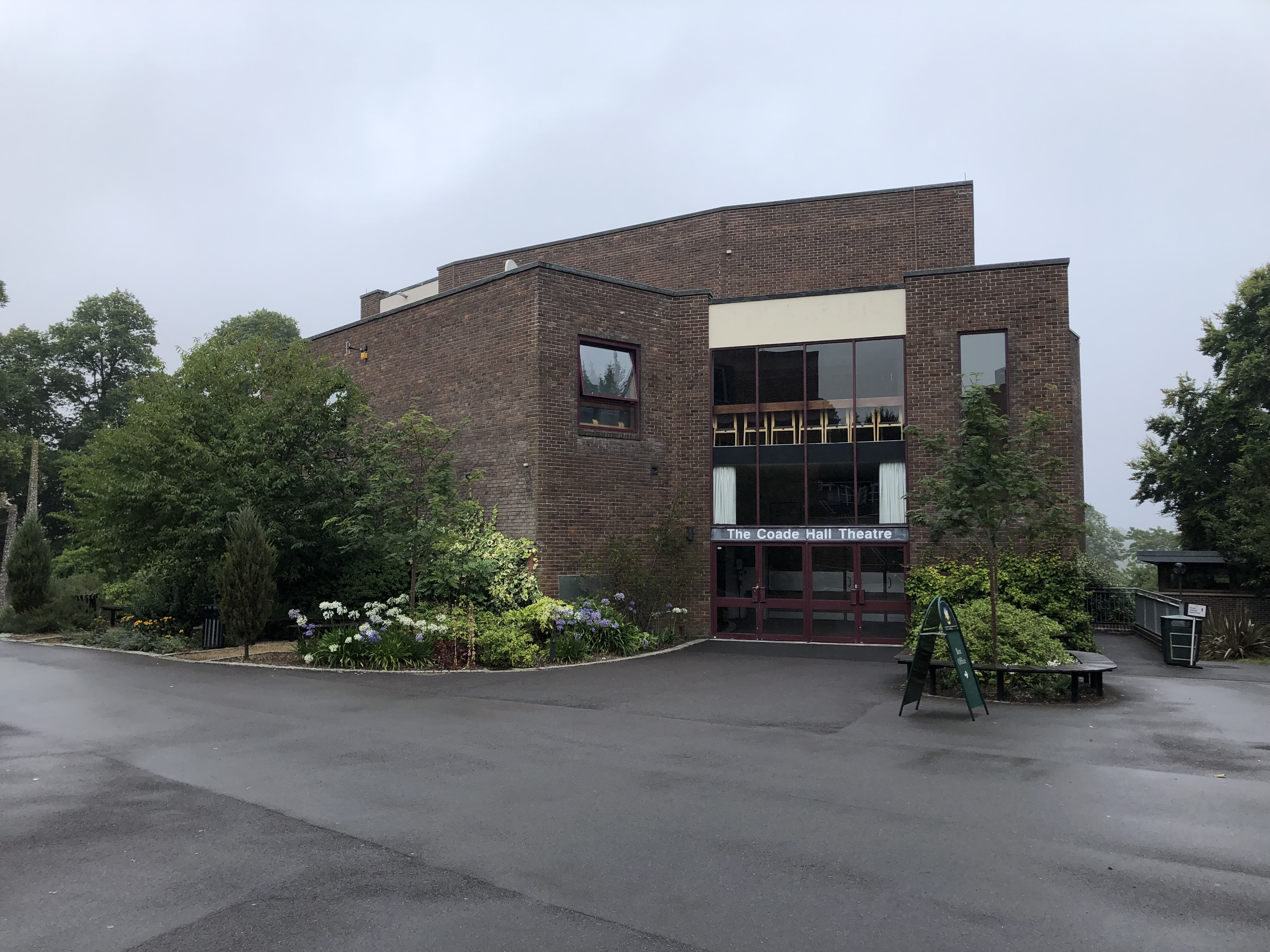
Coade Hall, Bryanston School, where performances take place (2002)

Dorset Opera Festival is an annual country house opera festival held at Bryanston School near Blandford Forum in Dorset, England. It presents fully staged opera productions featuring professional soloists, conductors and orchestral musicians alongside participants in its residential opera summer school.

Operas are staged at the conclusion of a two-week summer school focused on the 18–25 age group, based at Bryanston School. It attracts performers from around Europe. Founded as Dorset Opera by Patrick Shelley at Sherborne School in 1974, it moved to Bryanston in 2005, when Roderick Kennedy became its artistic director, and it became Dorset Opera Festival in 2011. Operas are staged in The Coade Hall theatre at the school, and touring productions are also staged elsewhere.

Productions:

1974: Smetana's The Bartered Bride

1976: Bizet's Carmen

1977: Verdi's Aida

1978: Puccini's Turandot

1979: Mozart's The Magic Flute

1980: Puccini's Edgar and Mascagni's Cavalleria rusticana

1981: Tchaikovsky's The Maid of Orleans

1982: Zeller's Der Vogelhändler

1988: Donizetti's Maria Padilla (first British stage performance)

2007: Puccini's Turandot – Berio completion and Alfano completion

2011: Puccini's Tosca and Verdi's Otello

2012: Verdi's Il trovatore, Puccini's Suor Angelica, and Le Carrosse du Saint-Sacrament by Lord Berners.

2013: La traviata, directed by Jonathan Miller, Wagner's The Flying Dutchman and a reduced version of La bohème staged by Dutch National Touring Opera.

2014: Verdi's Aida and Beethoven's only opera, Fidelio

2015: Verdi's Un Ballo in Maschera and Donizetti's L'elisir d'amore

2016: Tchaikovsky's Eugene Onegin and Verdi's Macbeth

2017: Gounod's Faust and Rossini's Le comte Ory

2018: Puccini's La bohème and Massenet's Le Cid (the British stage première)

2019: Donizetti's Lucia di Lammermoor and Verdi's Nabucco

2021: Mozart's Don Giovanni, Mozart's Così fan tutte and Handel's Acis & Galatea in the Mozart orchestration

2022: Puccini's Manon Lescaut and Mozart's The Magic Flute

2023: Mozart's Le nozze di Figaro and Massenet's Le Roi de Lahore (finalist in the International Opera Awards 2023)

2024: Puccini's Madama Butterfly and Paul Carr's Under The Greenwood Tree (librettist Euan Tait, after Thomas Hardy)

2025: Verdi's Rigoletto, Puccini's Suor Angelica and Mascagni's Cavalleria Rusticana

2026: Donizetti's L'elisir d'amore and Saint-Saens' Samson et Dalila

== See also ==
- List of opera festivals
