= Clive Seale =

British sociologist

Clive Seale (born 1955) is a British sociologist. He is Professor of Sociology at Brunel University. Until 2012, he was Professor of Medical Sociology in the Institute of Health Sciences Education at Queen Mary, University of London, England.

== Overview ==
Seale was educated at Bryanston School in Dorset. He then studied for BEd, MSc, and PhD degrees at the University of Southampton, Royal Holloway, University of London and from the UK Council for National Academic Awards (CNAA). He has been a professor at Goldsmiths College in east London (until 2003), Queen Mary, University of London (2008–12), and Brunel University in west London (2003–8, 2012 onwards).

Seale does research into communication in health care settings, end-of-life care, mass media and health, and social research methods. He is Managing Editor of the journal Sociology of Health and Illness.

== End of life decision making ==
Clive Seale's research has investigated the prevalence of euthanasia and assisted suicide in the UK. Although some members of the public were surprised at the number of accelerated deaths and cases of continuous deep sedation in the UK, the rate is lower than in many other countries. He has found that UK doctors are more likely to have an open discussion about decisions which may hasten patient's death than in other countries. His research into attitudes towards euthanasia has found doctors to be less in favour of legalising euthanasia or forms of assisted dying than the general public.

He has also investigated the role of religion in end of life decision making, finding that a doctor's faith influences whether they are likely to take decisions which hasten death, and whether they discuss making such decisions with their patients. Non-religious doctors were more likely to take medical decisions which may have hastened death than religious ones, however when religious doctors took such decisions they were less likely to have discussed them with their patients first. It appears therefore that doctor's religious values are strongly linked to ethically controversial decision making, against the advice of the British Medical Association, which instructs doctors not to let their religious views interfere with treatment of patients.

== Publications ==
Clive Seale has authored many research papers and books. His books include:

- Seale, C. (1998). Constructing Death: The Sociology of Dying and Bereavement. Cambridge University Press. ISBN 978-0-521-59430-1 (hardback). ISBN 978-0-521-59509-4 (paperback).
- Seale, C. (1999). The Quality of Qualitative Research. SAGE Publications. ISBN 978-0-7619-5597-9 (hardback).
- Seale, C. (2001). Medical Knowledge, 2nd edition. Open University Press. ISBN 978-0-335-20834-0 (paperback).
- Davey, B., Gray, A., Seale, C. (2002). Health and Disease: A Reader, 3rd edition. Open University Press. ISBN 978-0-335-20968-2 (hardback). ISBN 978-0-335-20967-5 (paperback).
- Seale, C. (2003). Media and Health. SAGE Publications. ISBN 978-0-7619-4729-5 (hardcover).
- Seale, C. (ed.) (2003). Social Research Methods: A Reader. Routledge. ISBN 978-0-415-30083-4 (hardback). ISBN 978-0-415-30084-1 (paperback).
- Seale, C. (ed.) (2004). Researching Society and Culture, SAGE Publications. (Second edition.) ISBN 978-0-7619-4196-5 (hardback). ISBN 978-0-7619-4197-2 (paperback).
- Seale, C., Gobo, G., Gubrium, J., and Silverman, D. (eds.) (2006). Qualitative Research Practice. SAGE Publications. ISBN 978-1-4129-3420-6 (paperback).
