= Scaplen's Court =

Museum and listed building in Poole, Dorset, England

Coordinates: 50°42′46″N 1°59′20″W

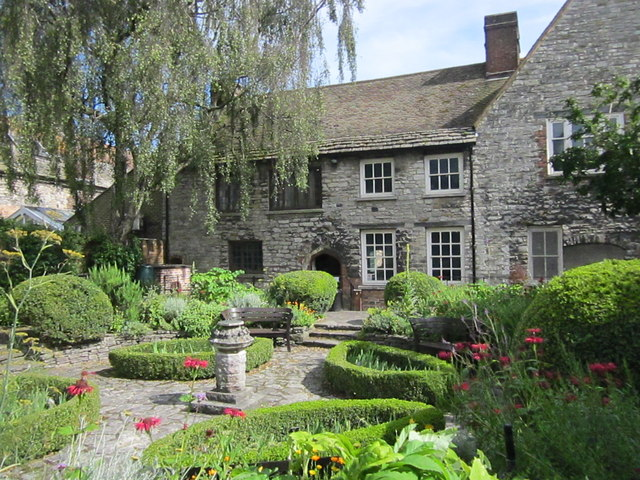
Scaplen's Court Museum in 2012.

Scaplen's Court is a fifteenth century Grade I listed house in Poole, Dorset, England, adjacent to the Poole Museum. The house is now used as a museum focusing on life in Poole between the fifteenth and nineteenth centuries, and includes a Victorian schoolroom and kitchen.

== History ==
Scaplen's Court was originally built in the late fifteenth century as a house for a rich merchant, and the style of the house was indicative of the prosperity of Poole at the time. The house was originally L-shaped, and was built of Purbeck and Bath stone, and cobbles from Poole Quay. The history of the house is uncertain, but a doorway in the courtyard displays the Poole shield of arms. It is believed that a maid named Agnes Beard was murdered at the house in 1598, and there are suggestions that her ghost haunts the house. It has also been suggested by local historians that the building may have been Poole's Old Town House, the first guildhall in the town, and that in the seventeenth century it was known as the George's Inn, and was occupied by the Roundheads during the English Civil War. During the eighteenth century, the house was acquired by John Scaplen, after whom the building is now named. In 1927, the Society of Poole Men bought the house for £16,000 and spent £430 on renovating the property. During the renovation, a shilling from the time of Mary I was found at the house. The building was opened to the public for the first time in 1929. In 1931, the house obtained a map believed to be the oldest map of Poole, which dated from 1643. The museum became a Grade I listed building in 1954, and was restored in 1986. In 2006/7, the museum was used to dry an Iron Age boat that had been recovered from Poole Harbour in 1964; the boat is now on display at the nearby Poole Museum.
