= Martin Checksfield =

English cricketer

Personal information
- Full name: Martin Frederic James Checksfield
- Born: 29 April 1939; Marylebone, London, England
- Died: 8 March 2002 (aged 62)
- Batting: Right-handed

Domestic team information
- Years: Team
- 1961: Oxford University

Career statistics
Competition	First-class
Matches	2
Runs scored	59
Batting average	14.75
100s/50s	0/0
Top score	42
Catches/stumpings	0/–
- Source: Cricinfo, 30 May 2019

Martin Frederic James Checksfield (29 April 1939 - 8 March 2002) was an English former first-class cricketer.

Checksfield was born at Marylebone and educated at Bryanston School, before going up to Christ Church, Oxford. While studying at Oxford he made his debut in first-class cricket for the Free Foresters against Oxford University in at Oxford in 1960. The following year he made a further appearance in first-class cricket, this time for Oxford University against Leicestershire at Oxford. He scored 59 runs across his two matches, with a high score of 42 for the Free Foresters.

Checksfield died on 8 March 2002.
