= John Nissen =

British inventor

John Nissen is a British inventor, technologist and musician. He attended Bryanston and Clare College, Cambridge, where he obtained a degree in natural sciences.

== SMART Award ==
In 1996, Nissen won a SMART award and set up Cloudworld Ltd. to develop assistive technology, with the mission to use computer-based systems to help disabled and disadvantaged people improve their quality of life. This led to the development of the WordAloud product and the invention of the Tactaphone.

His company, Cloudworld Ltd., produces assistive readers (notably the WordAloud product) and conducts research into literacy and technology, including in developing countries such as Sri Lanka.

== Investigating geo-engineering ==
Since early 2008, Nissen has been investigating geo-engineering, which he believes is urgently needed to save the Arctic sea ice.
