= Richard Horden =

British architect (1944–2018)

Richard Manaton Horden
- Born: 26 December 1944
- Died: 5 October 2018 (aged 73)
- Education: Bryanston School
- Alma mater: The Architectural Association
- Occupation: Architect
- Employer: Horden Cherry Lee Architects

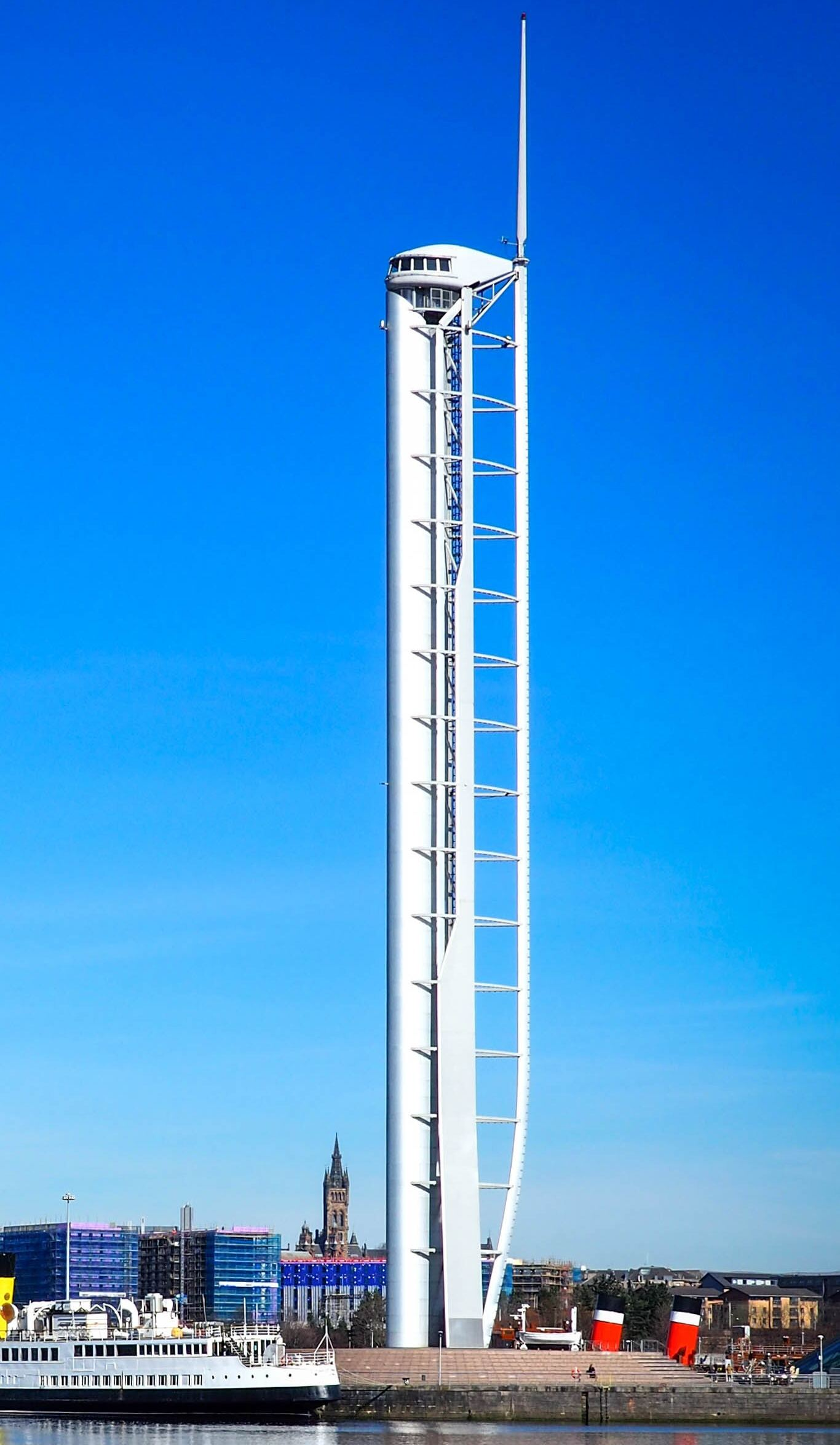
Glasgow Tower completed posthumously in 2001 from Horden's 1992 design

Richard Manaton Horden (26 December 1944 – 5 October 2018), was a British architect based in London. Following an early career with Norman Foster, where he worked for ten years, he established his own practice Richard Horden Associates in 1985, which became Horden Cherry Lee Architects in 1999. Richard Horden is the pioneer of small-scale structures constructed with the most advanced materials and techniques available.

== Career ==
Horden was educated at Bryanston School in Dorset and trained at The Architectural Association in London. He received a scholarship for a tour of America in 1968, where he saw the influential 1950 Rockefeller Guest House in New York by Philip Johnson, the California houses by Craig Ellwood, and the sculptures of Kenneth Snelson.

Horden worked at Foster and Partners from 1975 with the architect Sir Norman Foster for 10 years, where he worked on the Sainsbury Centre for Visual Arts and Stansted Airport projects.

He started his own firm Richard Horden Associates in 1985.

Horden was Professor in Architecture and Product Design at the Technical University of Munich. Combining high-tech engineering with industrial design methodologies, he and his research students in Munich have developed a series of experimental building prototypes for diverse and extreme environments. These include the Ski Haus, which was airlifted to the Alps for use by mountaineering and rescue teams; modular living units designed for Antarctic conditions; and the Micro Compact Home, a fully self-contained prefabricated dwelling measuring approximately 2.65 square metres in footprint. The projects explore compact living solutions and adaptable architectural responses to changing environmental conditions, evolving lifestyles, and basic human needs.

He died on 5 October 2018 at the age of 73.

== Projects ==
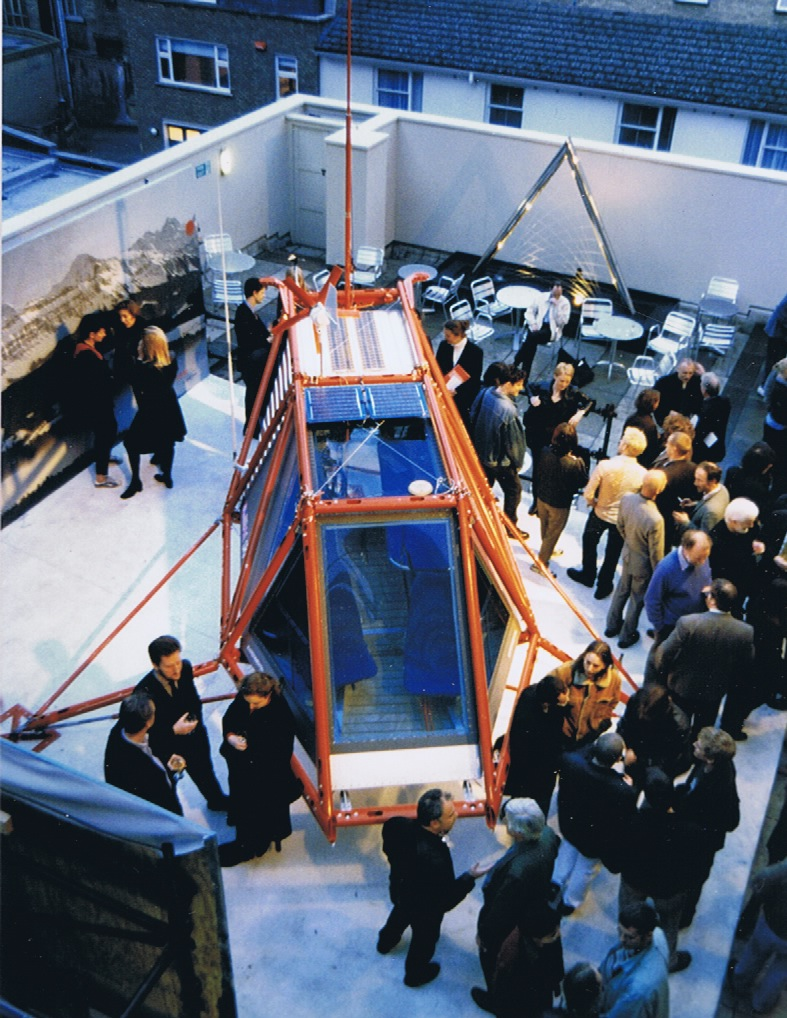
Horden's 1991 Ski Haus pictured at the RIBA, London

- Yacht House, New Forest (1984)
- Ski Haus (1991)

Ski Haus was conceived while skiing late and high in the Alps: evening sun, a beautiful, clear, starlit night, twinkling lights of the village in the valley, a reluctance to return: Would it be possible to stay here in the beautiful, cold silence? The SkiHaus serves as a mobile alpine hut or a ‘hard tent’. The lightweight, all-aluminium structure weighs only 315 kg and is designed to be lifted into position by helicopter. It is well-insulated using lightweight aviation materials and has a self-sufficient energy system powered by solar and wind generators. Since 1992 the SkiHaus has been tested by the team together with mountain guides and helicopter engineers at varying altitudes in the Swiss Alps up to 3901m (next to the ‘Kleines Matterhorn’). It will be used further by the local mountain guide centres for ski touring, climbing, guide training, ski races and medical positions. Besides its rescue and safety functions, the SkiHaus is an architectural vehicle with which to explore the third dimension and the wide clear spaces on top of the mountains. It has been situated on the Swiss-Italian ridge close to the ‘Kleines Matterhorn" since May 2004 and is currently used as shelter and accommodation for skiers and climbers.

- Queens Stand, Epsom Downs Racecourse (1992)
- The Yacht House (1992)

The Yacht House is so called as it is built with aluminium and stainless steel spars from a Tornado Yacht. The owner worked for a local yacht component supplier. The winner of a BBC 2 Television Innovation Award in 1994 and exhibited at The Museum of Modern Art, Home Delivery Show in 2008. The building structure is arranged in a taught discipline of columns on a 3.7m grid. The house is a perfect square on plan made up of 5 x 5 bays giving a footprint of 342 sqm. The entrance is located on the axis and central bay. Roof and cladding modules can be moved to rearrange the plan and to add to as required by the owner. After the concrete slab was laid by a local builder the light aluminium and stainless steel frame was assembled on site by the owner and family in 5 hours 6 minutes and 11 seconds.

- Glasgow Tower (2001)
- Glasgow Science Centre (2001)
- 1 Finsbury Square, London (2004)
- NASA Projects - Astronaut Workstation, International Space Station(2004)

The International Space Station, founded on decades of international experience, and incorporating permanent and long-term human presence in space, also requires the leap from human to humane environment on board. Everyday life in microgravity is turned upside down. The seat restraint component of this Astronaut Workstation was tested in microgravity on the International Space Station in 2007 – 2010. The human body itself follows completely different static and motion schemes than those of a 1g environment. Every item used must be prevented from floating away. Minimal mass and multi-functionality are not aesthetic guidelines but a simple necessity. The microgravity projects, conducted since 1998 in collaboration with the department for astronautics, Eduard Igenbergs, at the Technical University of Munich and NASA's Johnson Space Center in Houston, put their main emphasis on the formulation of design criteria for the functional organization of workplaces and leisure areas on board the ISS. Individual groups proposed solutions for standardized sanitary, sleeping and living racks within the habitation module.

- Poole Museum, Poole (2006)
- Micro Compact Home (m-ch) 2005

London, New York, Munich & Zurich An innovative eco home challenges the lifestyle of single people. Designed as a prototype for student accommodation it was developed to create the first "M-ch" village building in Munich. The Micro-compact Home may be arranged as a single unit raised above the ground on a light aluminium frame and placed in a garden for private use. Its compact dimensions make it easily integrated with shrubs and trees. Micro-compact Home may be grouped in horizontal or vertical arrangements in compact clusters, or form larger villages for social or student accommodation or for short-stay business or leisure uses.

== Books ==
- Richard Horden: Light Tech (Birkhäuser, 1995)
- peak_lab (Technical University of Munich, 2003)
- Richard Horden – through space (ed. by Massimo Perriccioli, Edizioni Kappa, 2003)
- Richard Horden – architecture and teaching (Birkhäuser, 2003)
- 60 projects (Technical University of Munich, 2004)
- Richard Horden: Micro Architecture: Lightweigth, Mobile, Ecological Buildings for the Future (Thames & Hudson, 2010)
