= Robson Fisher =

British headmaster

- Born: 9 April 1921
- Died: 26 January 2000 (aged 78)
- Other names: Francis George Robson Fisher
- Education: Liverpool College; Worcester College, Oxford
- Occupation: Schoolmaster
- Years active: 1947–1974
- Employer(s): British Army; Kingswood School; Bryanston School
- Known for: Headmaster of Bryanston School (1959–1974)
- Spouse: Sheila Dunsire

Francis George Robson Fisher (9 April 1921 – 26 January 2000) was a British educationalist and headmaster.

Robson Fisher, as he was generally known, attended Liverpool College, where he became head boy. He won an exhibition in Classics and was educated at Worcester College, Oxford 1940–1941 and 1946–1947, with a break for war service during World War II with the Artillery in north Africa and Italy (1942–1945). On his return, he switched subjects to English and graduated BA, later promoted to MA.

He then joined the staff of Kingswood School in Bath, becoming Head of English and a Housemaster. He was headmaster at Bryanston School in Dorset for much of his career (1959–1974), succeeding Thorold Coade. He oversaw the arrival of girls at the school in 1972. The Robson Fisher Room at the school is named after him. In 1974, he became the Chief Master of King Edward's School, Birmingham.

Towards the end of his career in 1982 he became Secretary to the Headmasters' Conference. He retired in 1986.

== Personal life ==
In 1965, Fisher married Sheila Dunsire, a lecturer in physical education and a county tennis player. Fisher died aged 78 in 2000.

Educational offices
Preceded by Thorold Coade	Head of Bryanston School; 1959–1974	Succeeded by David Jones
