= J. G. Jeffreys =

School founder and headmaster (1893–1977)

Jeffrey Graham Jeffreys
- Born: 30 April 1893; Adelaide, Australia
- Died: 1977 (aged 84); Bournemouth, Dorset, England
- Education: St Peter's College (Adelaide); University of Melbourne; Christ Church, Oxford
- Occupations: Schoolmaster; Priest
- Employer(s): Barker College (Sydney); Ballarat Church of England Grammar School; Melbourne Grammar School (South Yarra); First Australian Imperial Force; Scotch College (Melbourne); Westminster School; Radley College; Bryanston School; Ottershaw School; Church of England
- Known for: Founder and headmaster of Bryanston School (1928–1932)
- Parents: John Edwin Jeffreys (father); Amy Pauline Jeffreys (mother)

Jeffrey Graham Jeffreys (1893–1977) was an Australian schoolteacher who moved to England and founded Bryanston School in Dorset.

Jeffreys was educated at the University of Melbourne and first taught at a number of schools in Australia. In 1916, he joined the Australian Imperial Force, when he was an assistant teacher at Melbourne Grammar School, and in the Field Artillery Brigade that sailed for Europe in 1917 on the troopship HMAT (His Majesty's Australian Transport) Shropshire. He suffered from shell shock in France and was subsequently sent to hospital in England for nine months. He then joined the Australian Flying Corps, achieving his commission just before the Armistice. His final rank was Lieutenant.

Jeffreys moved to England in 1921 to teach chemistry at Westminster School in London. The headmaster of the school encouraged him to take a second degree at Christ Church, Oxford. He then taught at Radley School just south of Oxford. However, he wished to found his own school. In Dorset, there were two options, Brownsea Island in Poole Harbour and Bryanston. The Earl of Shaftesbury offered financial backing and to be the Chairman of Governors. In 1928, Jeffreys founded Bryanston School as the "Master", with seven assistants and 23 boys aged between 13 and 16. He chose the school crest (a rising sun) and the school motto Et Nova Et Vetera (Latin for "Both New and Old").

Jeffreys promoted the Dalton Plan, which was at that time still quite new, at Bryanston. The Dalton Plan was originally developed by the American teacher Helen Parkhurst at Dalton High School in Massachusetts in the 1920s. It combined old and new approaches, hence the school motto.

There was some friction with the governors, and Jeffreys resigned in 1931, taking up a post at Ottershaw College in Surrey.

In later life, Jeffreys was a curate and vicar at various churches in England, including St Margaret's Church, Oxford (1950–53) and Chesterton with Wendlebury in Oxfordshire (1953–59).

Educational offices
Preceded by none	Head of the Bryanston School; 1928–1932	Succeeded by Thorold Coade
