= Poole Museum =

Local history museum in Dorset, England

Coordinates: 50.7125°N 1.9888°W

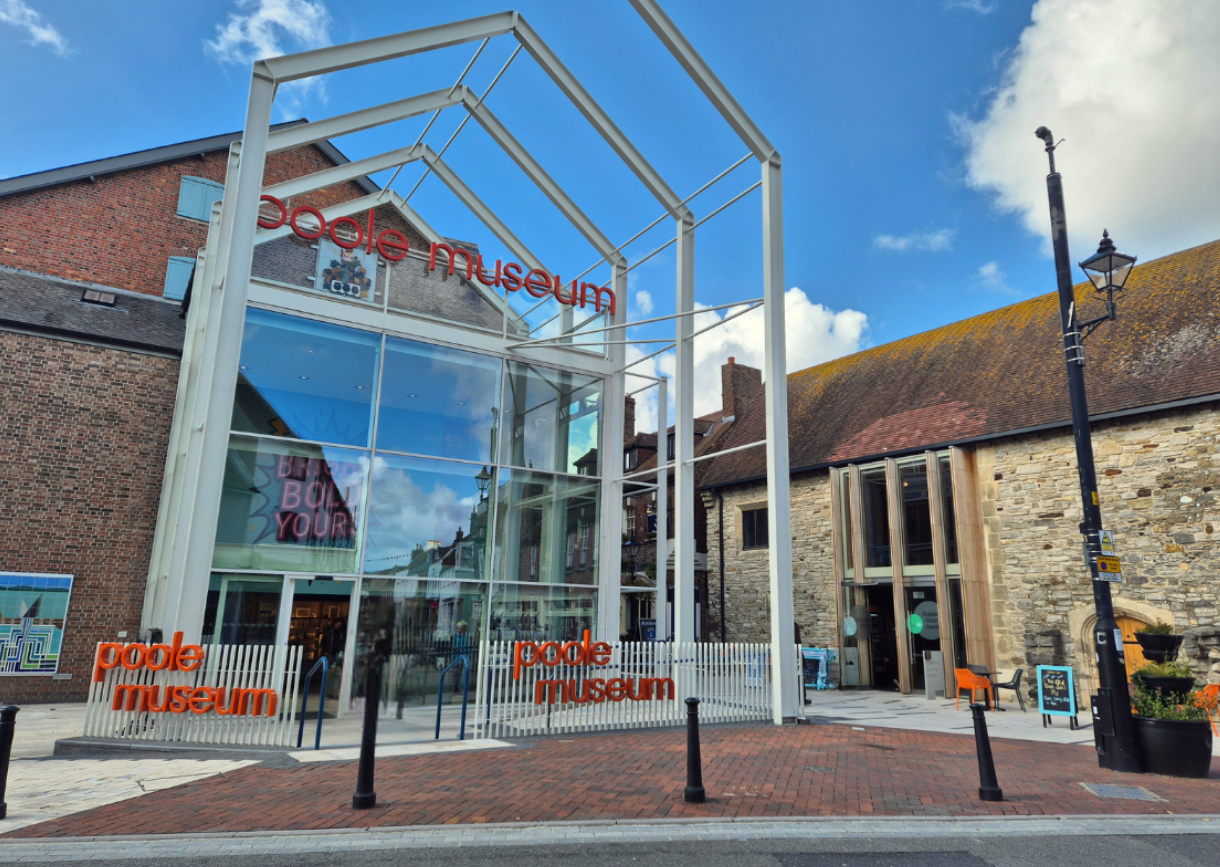
The entrance to Poole Museum

Poole Museum (formerly known as the Waterfront Museum) is a maritime museum, gallery and cultural centre, situated on the Lower High Street in the Old Town area of Poole, Dorset, and is owned by Bournemouth, Christchurch and Poole Council. Entrance to Poole Museum is free, and the museum was the fifth most visited free attraction in southwest England in 2015.

The Local History Centre is attached to the museum in a Grade I listed medieval town cellars. Poole Museum Service also manages Scaplen's Court Museum and Garden, situated next to Poole Museum.

== History and exhibits ==
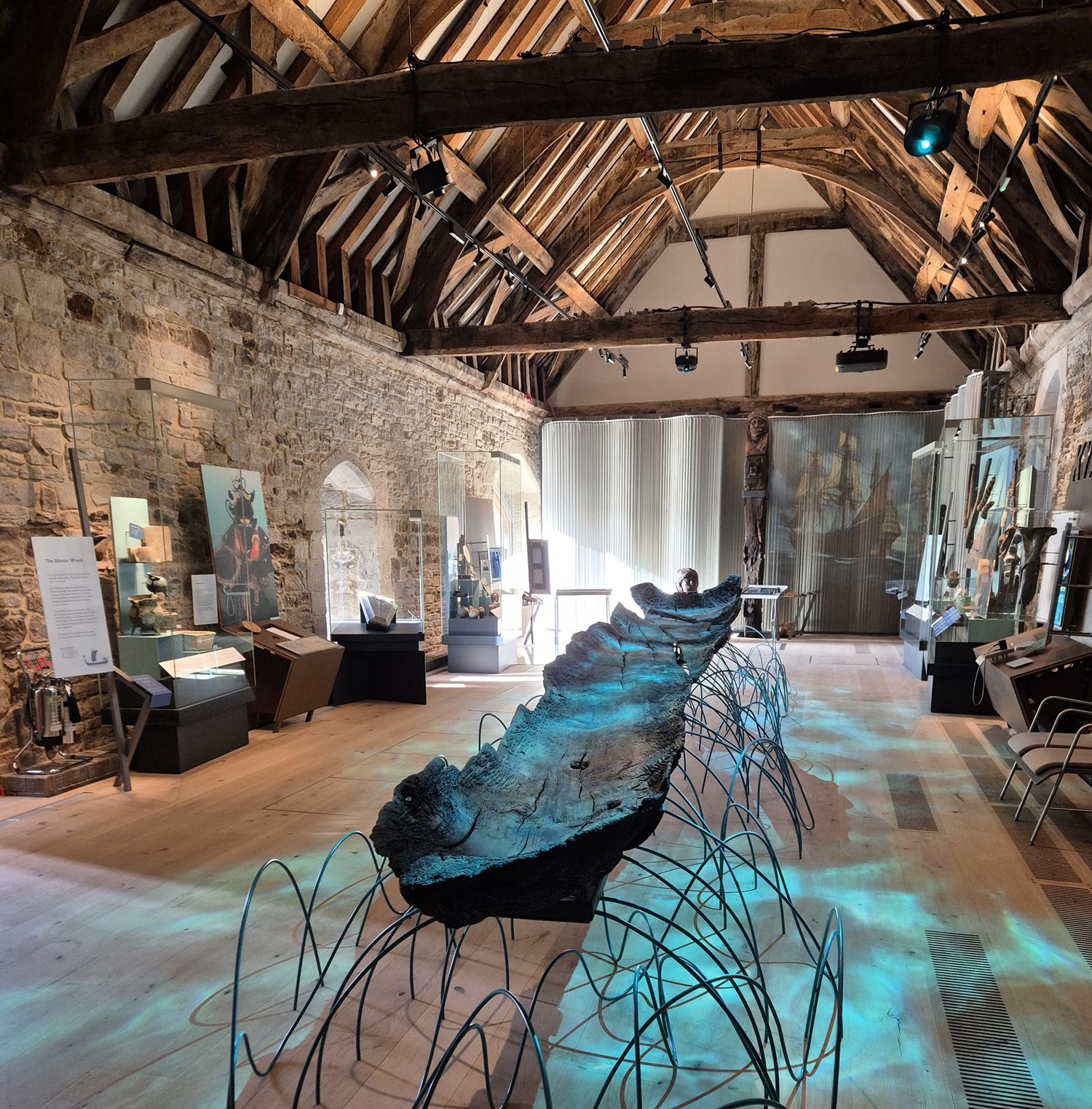
The Poole Logboat is the centrepiece of the museum

The Poole Museum opened in 1989 in a 19th-century harbour warehouse. A major refurbishment of the museum took place in 2005 at a cost of £1,300,000 funded by the Heritage Lottery Fund and local fundraising. The renovated museum opened in July 2007 including a terrace, visitor lounge, and new glass atrium entrance designed by Richard Horden of Horden Cherry Lee Architects.

In 2021, the museum was given a £2.24 million grant by the National Lottery Heritage Fund. In May 2022 it was reported that redevelopment costs had increased by 20%. The museum closed for renovation in December 2022 with plans to reopen in late 2024. In May 2023, the Poole Logboat was removed into safe storage.

The Poole Museum reopened in November 2025 after a seven-year redevelopment project costing £10 million. All three of the museum's historic buildings were restored, and three new maritime galleries were opened. The main focus of one of their new galleries is a preserved 13th-century shipwreck known as the Mortar Wreck, alongside various artifacts the vessel was carrying when it sank.

The centrepiece of the museum is the 2,000-year-old Poole Logboat, an Iron Age vessel which was found in 1964 during dredging work in Poole Harbour.

The museum displays a stone named Bethan's Rock that a five-year-old child donated in 2019, after she learned about museums and their preservation activities. The museum also features a wooden hippopotamus sculpture by Peter Hand that was previously at the Dolphin Centre. When first introduced in 1969 it was designed for children to play on.
