= The Coade Hall =

Theatre in Dorset, England

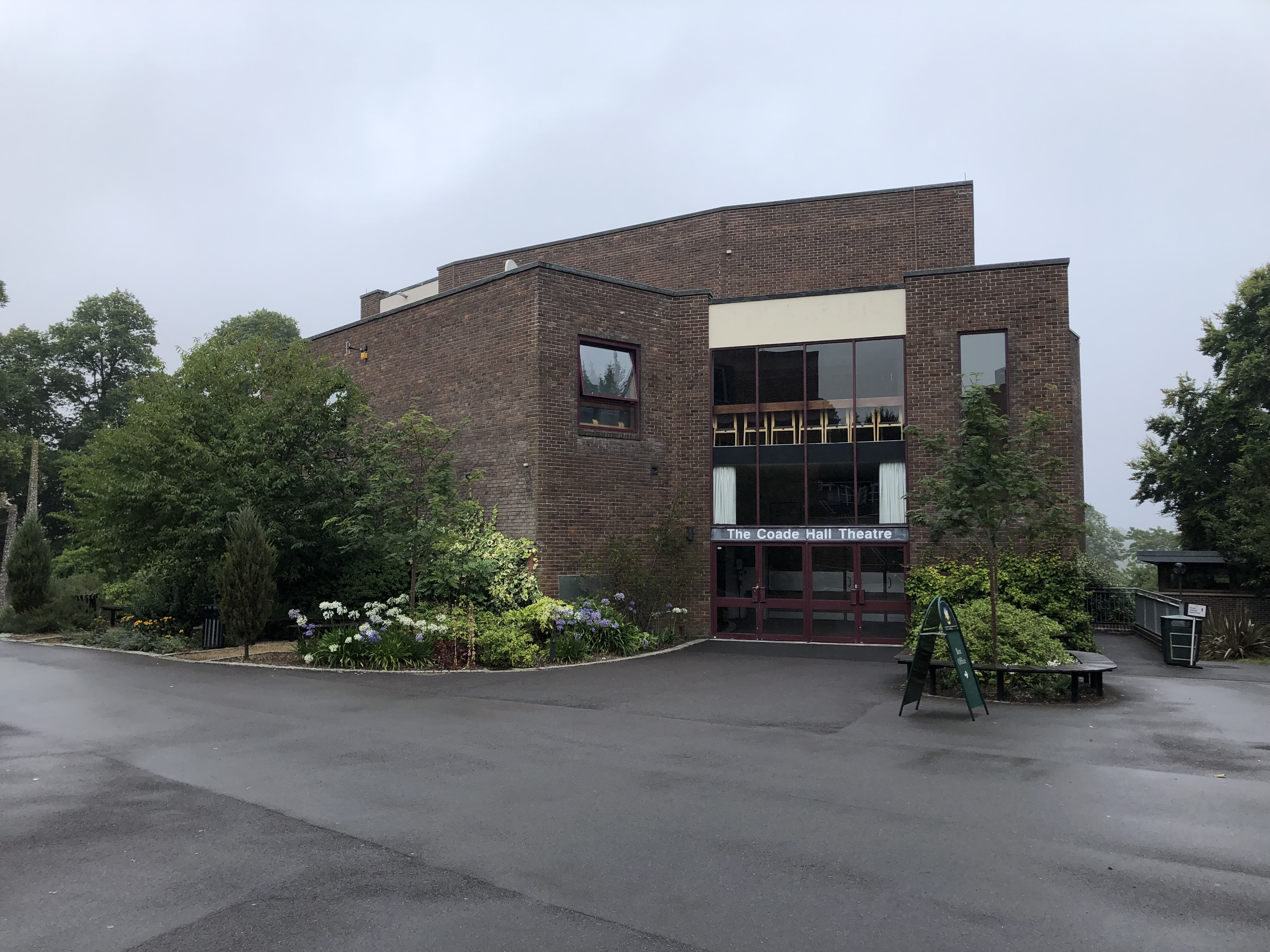
- View of the theatre entrance in 2022
- Interactive map of The Coade Hall
- Address: Bryanston School, Blandford Forum DT11 0PX; Dorset; United Kingdom
- Coordinates: 50.866°N 2.186°W
- Owner: Bryanston School
- Operator: Bryanston School
- Type: Theatre and concert hall

Construction
- Opened: 27 May 1966; 60 years ago

Website
- Coade Hall web page

The Coade Hall is a brick-built theatre and concert hall at Bryanston School, near Blandford Forum in Dorset, England.

== History ==
It was opened on 27 May 1966 by the Duke of Edinburgh. On the opening night, there was a concert with music by Brahms, Britten, and Mozart.

The Coade Hall is named after Thorold Coade, headmaster of Bryanston School from 1932 to 1959. It is used for professional performances and also by the school for drama, assemblies, and other communal activities. Performers such as Johnny Dankworth, Cleo Laine, George Melly, Rowan Atkinson, and Steamhammer have appeared there. The theatre is also a venue for opera, including the annual Dorset Opera Festival.
