= Thorold Coade =

British headmaster (1896–1963)

Thorold Francis Coade
- Born: 3 July 1896; Glebe House, Syndenham Terrace, Brighton Road, Rathgar, Dublin, Ireland
- Died: 1 February 1963 (aged 66); East Knoyle, England
- Education: Glebe House School; Harrow School; Royal Military College, Sandhurst; University of Oxford
- Occupation: Schoolmaster
- Years active: 1922–1959
- Employer(s): British Army; Harrow School; Bryanston School
- Known for: Headmaster of Bryanston School (1932–1959)
- Notable work: The Burning Bow (Allen & Unwin, 1966)
- Spouse: Kathleen Eleanor (1922)
- Children: 2
- Parents: Rev. Charles Edward Coade (methodist minister) (father); Jessie Wilhelme Coade (née Spencer) (mother)

Thorold Francis Coade (3 July 1896 – 1 February 1963) was a British schoolmaster.

Thorold Coade was born in Dublin, the son of C. E. Coade, a methodist minister, and educated at Glebe House School in Hunstanton, Harrow School (1910–15), and the Royal Military College, Sandhurst. By 1916, he was serving in France with the Loyal Regiment (North Lancashire). Wounded at the Battle of the Somme, he served in East Anglia for the rest of the First World War.

Coade took a degree in English at Oxford University with distinction in 1921 and the next year returned to Harrow School as a junior master.

In 1932, Coade became headmaster of Bryanston School, Dorset, succeeding J. G. Jeffreys, and remained in post until 1959. He believed in self-discipline and developed this at the school. He also developed "pioneering" at the school, to augment team sports. This consisted of community-related activities, such as forestry in the extensive grounds of the school. An open-air Greek-style theatre was built by "pioneers" in the grounds of the school during Coade's time as headmaster during the early 1950s. Coade was keen on drama, and the school's theatre, opened in 1966, is named the Coade Hall in his memory.

At the time of his death in 1963, Coade was living at East Knoyle, near Salisbury in Wiltshire.

== Selected publications ==
Coade produced a number of books:

- Coade, Thorold F. (1924). Latin Translation Simplified.
- Coade, Thorold F., ed. (1932). Harrow Lectures on Education.
- Coade, Thorold F. (1939). Manhood in the Making. London: Peter Davis.
- Coade, Thorold F. (1966). The Burning Bow: A Selection of His Papers. London: Allen & Unwin. ISBN 0-04-370001-2. ISBN 978-0043700013

Educational offices
Preceded by J. G. Jeffreys	Head of the Bryanston School; 1932–1959	Succeeded by Robson Fisher
