= Bryanston School =

Public school in Bryanston near Blandford Forum, Dorset, England

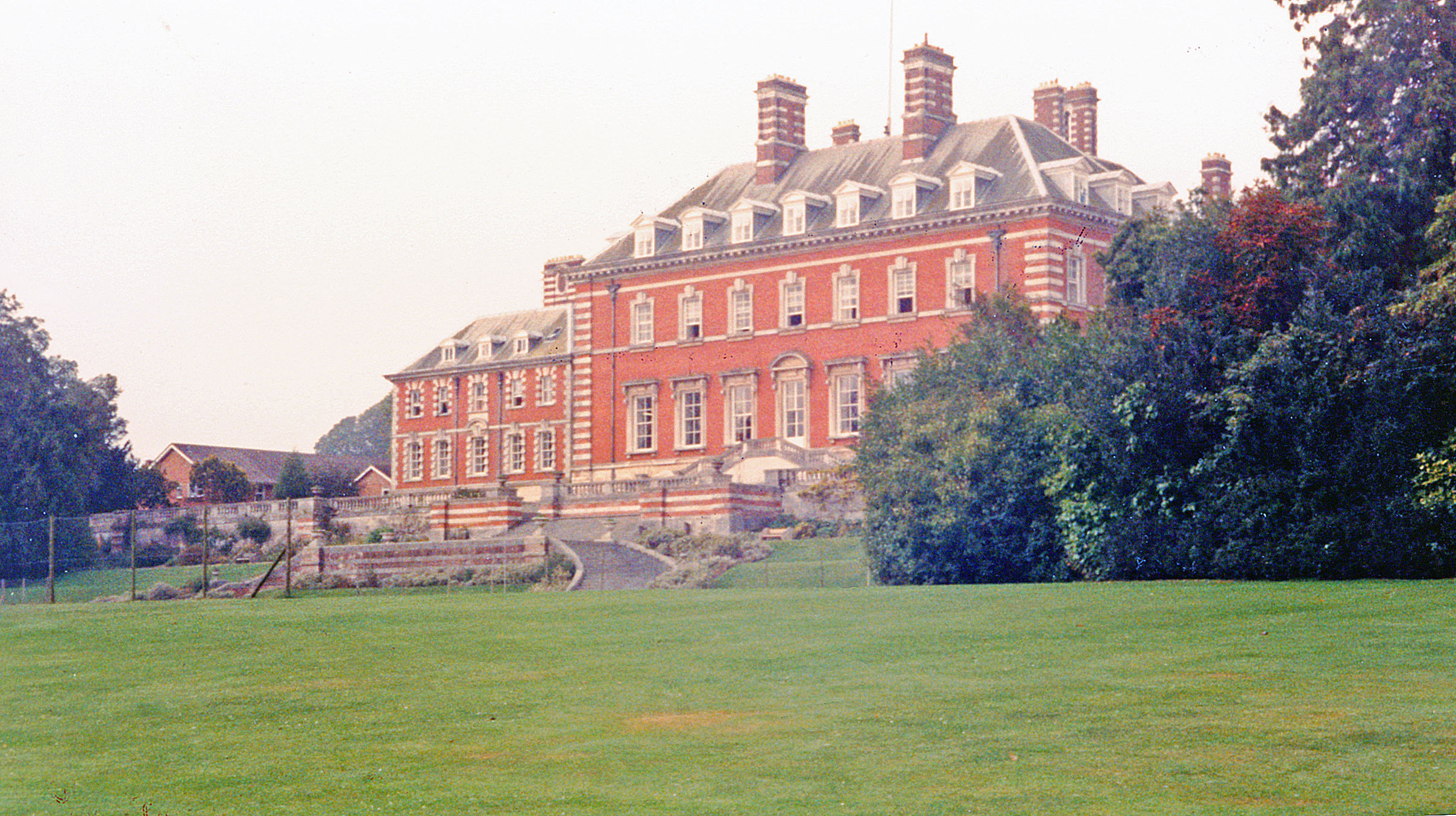

Location
- Bryanston; Blandford Forum, Dorset, DT11 0PX; England; 50°51′58″N 2°11′10″W

Information
- Type: Public school Private school
- Motto: Et nova et vetera (Both the new and the old)
- Religious affiliation: Church of England
- Established: 1928; 98 years ago
- Founder: J. G. Jeffreys
- Department for Education URN: 113910 Tables
- Headmaster: Richard Jones
- Staff: 118
- Gender: Mixed
- Age: 13 to 18
- Enrolment: 809 pupils
- Houses: 12 (2 Junior Boys, 5 Girls, 5 Senior Boys)
- Colours: Dark blue and Gold
- Alumni: Old Bryanstonians
- Website: www.bryanston.co.uk

Bryanston School is a public school (English private boarding and day school for pupils aged 13–18) located next to the village of Bryanston, and near the town of Blandford Forum, in Dorset in South West England. It was founded in 1928. It occupies a country house designed and built in 1889–94 by Richard Norman Shaw for Viscount Portman, the owner of large tracts in the West End of London, in the early version of neo-Georgian style that Sir Edwin Lutyens called "Wrenaissance", to replace an earlier house, and is set in 400 acres (1.6 km^{2}).

Bryanston is a member of the Headmasters' and Headmistresses' Conference and the Eton Group. It has a reputation as a liberal and artistic school using some ideas of the Dalton Plan.

== History ==
=== Founding ethos ===
Bryanston was founded in 1928 by a young schoolmaster from Australia named J. G. Jeffreys. He gained financial support for the school during a period of severe economic instability with financial backing from Anthony Ashley-Cooper, 9th Earl of Shaftesbury; he paid £35,000 for the Bryanston House and its 450 acres (1.8 km^{2}) of immediate grounds.

The school occupies a country house designed and built in 1889–1894 by Richard Norman Shaw and modelled on the chateau at Menars in the Loire valley. Shaw designed the house for Viscount Portman to replace an earlier one. The building and estate was the biggest in Dorset and the last of the grand stately homes to be built in England. The home had been occupied by the Portman family for 30 years at the time of its sale, but death duties made it impossible for the 4th Lord Portman to hold on to his family estate.

There were seven teachers and 23 boys of various ages in the first term. Jeffreys innovated while respecting traditions, as reflected in his choice of school motto, Et Nova Et Vetera. His was the first English school to adopt the Dalton Plan, its combination of the new and the old being of particular appeal. The system was flexible enough to offer a combination of lessons in the classroom and time for assignment work in subject rooms, which gave the students the freedom to decide which pieces of academic work to focus their attention. Students are required to keep a daily record on a chart showing their use of working and leisure time, meeting with their tutors on a weekly basis to ensure effective monitoring of their progress.

=== Subsequent developments ===
The school opened on 24 January 1928 with 23 pupils and seven members of staff. It grew as a boys' school to some 450 pupils before admitting girls in 1972 – initially into the 6th form only. By 2004, the school had around 650 pupils and 80 teachers. In 2024, Bryanston has 819 pupils and a capacity of 911.

The Don Potter Art School opened in 1997. Bryanston is a member of the Headmasters' and Headmistresses' Conference and the Eton Group. It has a reputation as a liberal and artistic school. The principles of the Dalton Plan are still in place today.

In 2005, the school was one of fifty of the country's leading independent schools that were found guilty of running an illegal price-fixing cartel.

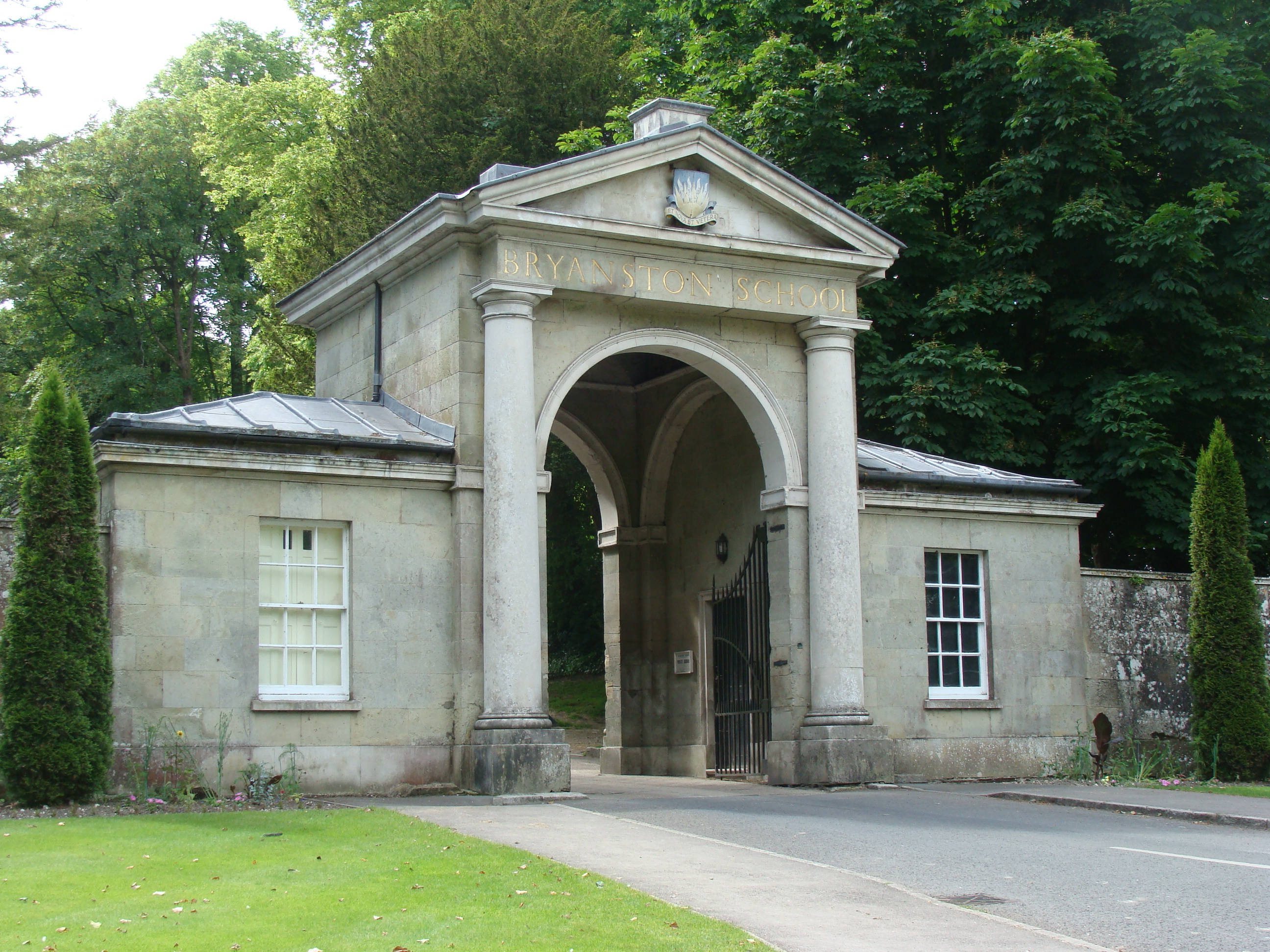
Grade II listed gateway to Bryanston School

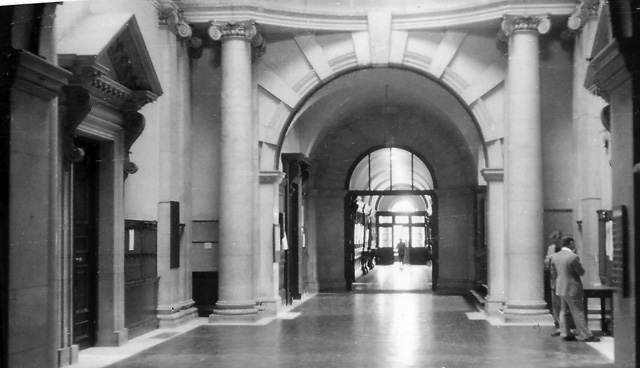
The main hall

In 2012, the new boathouse was opened to facilitate the growing rowing programme and to prevent risk to the boats from flooding. It was designed by ABL3 Architects and was shortlisted for a Royal Institute of British Architects award.

In 2014, the school opened a new music building, the Tom Wheare Music School, designed by Hopkins Architects and named after a headmaster of Bryanston. The 300-seat concert hall was named after conductor Sir Mark Elder, who is a former pupil. The interior of the building won a 2015 Wood Award.

== Academic performance ==
The 2023 results are

- GCSE Results (2023): 38% achieved grades 9-7
- A Level Results (2023): 57% attained grades A*-B

== Heads of Bryanston ==
- J. G. Jeffreys (1928–32)
- Thorold Coade (1932–59)
- Robson Fisher (1959–74)
- Rev. David Jones (1974–82)
- Bob Allan (acting head, 1982–83)
- Tom Wheare (1983–2005)
- Sarah Thomas (2005–2019) – first female head of Bryanston
- Mark Mortimer (2019–2021)
- Richard Jones (2021–present)

== Other notable teachers ==
- David Briggs (1917–2020), classics (1946–1959)
- Don Potter (1902–2004), sculpture and pottery (1940–1984)

== Notable alumni ==
Alumni of the school are known as Old Bryanstonians; there is an alumni organisation called the Bryanston Society. "The Society exists to further the cause of Bryanston in the broadest possible sense. It aims to bring together the whole Bryanston family through social and sporting events."

== Other information ==
- The school estate has Europe's tallest London plane tree (160 ft).
- Each year, the JACT Ancient Greek Summer School is held at Bryanston.
- The school hosts the annual Dorset Opera Festival, which combines amateur and professional performers. Operas are staged at the conclusion of a two-week summer school.
- Research for her 2006 novel Wicked! led author Jilly Cooper to interview former pupils.

== See also ==
- List of independent schools in the United Kingdom
- Canford School, a boarding school in Dorset
- R. Norman Shaw (1831–1912), architect of the main building
- The Coade Hall, a theatre at the school
