= Leonard Burt (born 1932) =

British policeman

Leonard Frank Burt
- Born: February 11, 1932
- Died: 24 November 2010 (aged 0)
- Known for: Discovery of the Portland spy ring, Operation Countryman
- Police career
- Country: Dorset Constabulary
- Rank: Assistant Chief Constable

Leonard Frank Burt (11 February 1932–24 November 2010) was a British policeman known for his involvement in Operation Countryman and his discovery of the Portland spy ring.

== Career ==
In 1959, Burt discovered that Harry Houghton, a worker at the Admiralty Underwater Weapons Establishment, was living beyond his means. Burt investigated Houghton and reported him to MI5, leading eventually to the unravelling of the Portland spy ring.

In 1978, Burt, together with Dorset Chief Constable Arthur Hambleton, headed Operation Countryman, an investigation into corruption in the Metropolitan Police Force. Burt acted as operational head of the investigation.

Burt ended his career as assistant chief constable of the Dorset police force, and died in 2010.
