= Killing of Claire Parry =

2020 killing in West Parley, Dorset, England

Claire Parry
- Born: 19 December 1978
- Died: 10 May 2020 (aged 41); Royal Bournemouth Hospital
- Cause of death: Brain injury caused by compression of the neck
- Body discovered: Horns Inn Car Park, West Parley, Dorset
- Occupation: Nurse Practitioner
- Spouse: Andrew Parry
- Partner: Timothy Brehmer (2006–2020)
- Children: 2

On 10 May 2020, 41-year-old Claire Parry, from Bournemouth, Dorset, England, was killed by off-duty Dorset Police officer Timothy Brehmer. Parry was strangled by Brehmer in the car park of the Horns Inn in West Parley, Dorset. Brehmer strangled Parry to death after fearing she would reveal the affair they were having to his wife.

Brehmer admitted manslaughter but denied murder. On 28 October 2020, he was acquitted of murder and convicted of manslaughter and received a ten-and-a-half-year prison sentence. Brehmer's sentence was found to be unduly lenient by the Court of Appeal, who, on 19 March 2021, increased his sentence to 13 years and 6 months.

== Background ==
=== Claire Parry ===
Claire Parry (19 December 1978 – 10 May 2020) was a nurse practitioner from Bournemouth, with a career of over 20 years. At the time of the incident, Parry worked as a nurse practitioner at Moordown Medical Centre, starting work there in 2018. She was married to Andrew, a Dorset Police officer, and they had two children.

Timothy Brehmer
- Born: Timothy Keith Brehmer
- Occupation: Police Officer (former)
- Years active: 2003–2020
- Employer: Dorset Police
- Organisation: Law Enforcement
- Known for: Killing of Claire Parry
- Criminal charges: Manslaughter
- Criminal penalty: 10 years 6 months imprisonment. Increased to 13 years and 6 months by Court of Appeal
- Criminal status: Imprisoned
- Spouse: Martha Brehmer (2003)
- Partner: Claire Parry (2005–2020) Kate Rhodes (2011–2012)
- Children: 1
- Parent: Rosalyn Chivers (Mother) Roger Chivers (Step-father)

=== Timothy Brehmer ===
Timothy Keith Brehmer, 41, was a police constable with Dorset Police. Born in Zimbabwe, he was raised by his mother and stepfather in Hampshire.

Raised in North Hampshire and growing up in Andover, Brehmer joined Dorset Police in 2003, where he first worked in Bournemouth. In 2010, he joined the Roads Policing Unit (RPU). At the time of the incident, he was seconded to the National Police Air Service (NPAS), based at Bournemouth Airport, where he operated the helicopters camera and assisted in navigation.

Brehmer met his wife, Martha, a Dorset Police detective, in 2003, marrying her three years later. At the time of the incident, they had a nine-year-old son and lived in Hordle, in the New Forest in Hampshire.

It was reported that Brehmer used "grooming" techniques to exert "coercive and controlling behaviour" over women. Colleagues in Dorset Police allegedly knew of Brehmer to prey on 'vulnerable' emergency workers, with him being described as a 'sexual predator'.

=== Affair ===
Parry and Brehmer met through work in 2005. At the time, Brehmer was a police officer and Parry worked at Royal Bournemouth Hospital. A few years later, they began an 'on and off relationship'. Parry and Brehmer had been having an affair for over ten years, however, prior to her death, she had faced the realisation that whilst her marriage was ending and that Brehmer was not who she thought he was, finding that he was a 'womaniser', involved in other affairs.

Parry's husband had suspected the affair months before Parry's death. Parry's husband hid his daughter's mobile in Parry's car and tracked Parry's location using an app. Parry's husband stated that he located evidence of the affair, including an email from Brehmer to Parry stating that she would 'never love someone as much as him'. It also included Parry's husband finding bookings for Travelodge on their joint bank account and under the couple's bed, a male's rugby shirt.

In February 2020, Parry's husband confronted her, and Parry confessed she had slept with Brehmer on one occasion, 'years ago'. Parry's husband met with Brehmer, who provided a 'well rehearsed' response regarding the affair.

Suspicion over the affair led to difficulties within the Parrys' marriage, resulting in them attending counselling. Despite this, Mr Parry resolved to leave his wife in March 2020. At that time, the couple were only living together due to the coronavirus lockdown.

On 6 May 2020, Brehmer met Parry whilst at work, visiting her at her home, where they slept together. That evening, Parry looked into Brehmer's background, by setting up a fake Facebook account, using the alias 'Louisa Morgan'. Parry concluded that Brehmer was a serial womaniser after conducting internet searches. She used the fake account to message Kate Rhodes, a Detective Constable with Dorset Police, who had unwittingly had an affair with Brehmer between 2011 and 2012, before she finished the relationship when she realised he was married. Parry and Rhodes worked out that Brehmer was likely to have had at least three lovers within the emergency services, including with another police officer.

Parry began relentlessly messaging Brehmer, accusing him of cheating and threatening to tell Brehmer's wife about their affair.

On the same day, Parry drafted a note to Brehmer's wife that revealed the affair, explaining that Brehmer was only staying for the sake of their children and that there were at least two more people he had had an affair with.

On 8 May 2020, Brehmer had worked a night shift and spoke to Parry on his way home. He gave her access to his social media accounts. Parry messaged Brehmer asking to meet him at 3pm in the car park of the Horns Inn pub in West Parley, Dorset the next day. She did not tell Brehmer why she wanted to meet, but stated that if he did not meet her, she would tell his wife about the affair.

== Incident ==
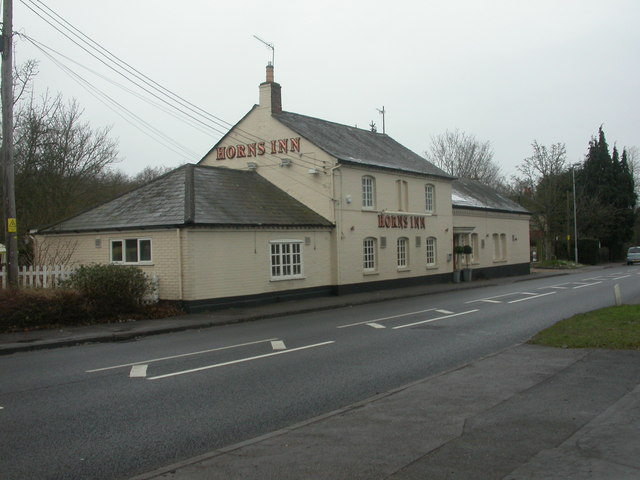
The Horns Inn, West Parley

On 9 May 2020, Parry and her husband had got on well, despite not sleeping in the same bed together. Brehmer was having a barbecue with his family. He lied to his wife, stating that he was going to work to collect some steaks for a barbecue, in order for him to meet Parry. Brehmer did attend work that day, however, this was just in case his wife rang asking if he was there.

Having arranged to meet in the car park of the Horns Inn car park on 9 May 2020, Brehmer arrived at 2:31pm, with Parry arriving at 2:44pm. They parked outside the view of CCTV. Parry got into the passenger seat of Brehmer's Citreon C1. Parry had met with Brehmer to confront him over another extra-marital affair.

At approximately 3pm, a neighbour to the car park heard a female and male arguing and shouting. Another neighbour heard some shouting between approximately 3:15pm and 3:30pm, as well as hearing a horn sounded two or three times.

It was alleged that Parry took Brehmer's phone from him to look through, typing 'I'm cheating on you' in a message to his wife. The message was sent at 3:02pm. Brehmer's wife received the message and tried to phone him, but he did not reply.

During this time, Parry was asphyxiated, with internal neck injuries that were severe, before going into cardiac arrest.

At 3:26pm, CCTV footage showed Brehmer walking towards the car park entrance, sitting on the pavement. He had knife wounds to his arm after self-harming with a penknife. A member of the public, Rachel Bartlett, was cycling past with her husband Lloyd and saw Brehmer covered in blood, walking towards the entrance. Brehmer asked her to call an ambulance.

Bartlett spoke to Brehmer, who was paying some attention to something behind him, but did not say Parry was in the car park. Brehmer was described Bartlett as 'very emotional' and 'difficult to understand'. Asking him what had happened, Brehmer told her that he had been stabbed.

Bartlett told the ambulance service via 999 they thought there was 'a dead person' in the car. As a result of what Brehmer had said about being stabbed by Parry (which would later be found to be a lie), the call handler from the ambulance service told the members of the public to stay away from Parry.

Mr Bartlett went to look at the cars in the car park, discovering Parry. He asked Brehmer 'is she dead?'. Another witness at the car, Mark Herridge, took over the 999 call and told the operator that he could not remove Parry from the car. He said that Parry had a 'blue face' and had 'blood in her mouth'. At this stage, paramedics arrived and Brehmer's car was moved. Herridge spoke to Brehmer who said Parry was 'going to tell' his wife.

At 3:31pm, a solo paramedic was dispatched to the location to reports of a 'stabbing'. He arrived in approximately six minutes, with another paramedic already being on scene directing him to the Citreon C1. The paramedic found Parry with her eyes closed and dried blood under her mouth and both eyes. This paramedic and another noticed marks and discolouration on Parry's neck. Paramedics began chest compressions.

Brehmer told the member of the public's husband 'I'm going to prison for a very long time'. A paramedic heard Brehmer say 'I fucked it up'. Brehmer explained to a medic that he had been having an affair with Parry and that she had made him meet him or that she would tell his wife and was worried he would lose his son. When police arrived, Brehmer told an officer that he could not remember what had happened. Brehmer was asked who caused the injuries and Brehmer stated that Parry had.

At 4:44pm, Brehmer was arrested on suspicion of attempted murder before being taken to Poole Hospital.

On 10 May 2020, despite her heart being restarted after it had stopped, Parry died at Royal Bournemouth Hospital after the compression of her neck had caused a brain injury.

The same day, Brehmer was taken from Weymouth Police Station to Salisbury District Hospital for an operation. Whilst there, at 9:27am, Brehmer stated that he might have stabbed himself, saying this was an attempt to end his life. At 9:28am, for the first time, Brehmer referred to the pushing and pulling that went on within the car, stating 'I was basically trying to get her out the car so I could go and kill myself'.

At 1:30pm, he arrived back at Weymouth Police Station. The police officer who had transported Brehmer was made aware that Parry had died and further arrested Brehmer at 1:55pm on suspicion of murder. Brehmer was cautioned and made no reply.

== Investigation and legal proceedings ==
=== Post-mortem ===
Dr Amanda Jeffery conducted a post-mortem on Parry which revealed her cause of death was a brain injury caused by compression of the neck.

Dr Jeffery noted 31 separate sites of blunt force trauma to the upper part of Parry's body. This included bruising to Parry's trunk in 9 areas and her upper right arm in 11 areas. Parry's left arm had 10 areas of bruising and abrasion, with an area of laceration and bruising in her mouth. Dr Jeffery determined that Parry's prominent areas of bruising on her arms were consistent with actions of grabbing and that the injury to Parry's mouth was consistent with a blow. Dr Jeffery stated that it was clear that in order to resist the violent attack from Brehmer, Parry had fought back hard.

Dr Jeffery noted Parry had a fractured hyoid bone, with cartilage to the left of the larynx also damaged. She found bruising in Parry's neck tissues and near her jaw line, as well as deep internal bleeding. There was 'multiple evidence of asphyxiation'. Dr Jeffery also noted haemorrhages in Parry's face which were consistent with neck compression. She stated that research suggested it would take approximately 30 seconds for these haemorrhages to form, but could not confirm this. Dr Jeffery reported how Parry's neck was compressed with such force and for such an amount of time that Parry had a cardiac arrest.

Dr Jeffery stated there were two mechanisms that may have caused Parry's injuries. This was either a person using the crook of their elbow as a 'fulcrum' or by a person putting their forearm across the throat. Dr Jeffery determined that Parry's neck was compressed for a minimum of between 10 and 30 seconds for the extent of her injuries to have been caused. As a result of either mechanisms, it led to Parry being asphyxiated, with her brain being starved of oxygen, which killed her.

=== Brehmer's police interview ===
Brehmer stated during his police interview that he and Parry had been seeing each other for 11 years, on and off. He stated that Parry wanted his phone to look at his 'perfect life' with his family. To try and show her how desperate he was, Brehmer stated that he stabbed himself in the arm. He stated he accidentally killed Parry as he tried to get her out of his car so he could kill himself after Parry had sent a text to his wife about their affair. Brehmer stated that as he did not have the strength to pull Parry out of the car, he thought that he could push her out instead. He stated that he lay across Parry, using his legs on the car seat to gain leverage to push her out the vehicle. In accordance with Parry's post mortem, Brehmer gave an account which did not explain the injuries to Parry's neck. Brehmer stated that he never intended to hurt Parry and the only person he should have hurt was himself.

=== Charge of murder ===
On Monday 11 May 2020, Brehmer was charged with Parry's murder. He was remanded in custody and appeared via video link at Poole Magistrates' Court on Tuesday 12 May.

=== Independent Office for Police Conduct (IOPC) referral ===
Although Brehmer was not on duty at the time of the incident, Dorset Police referred themselves to the Independent Office for Police Conduct (IOPC) due to Brehmer being a police officer and how serious the charge was.

=== Brehmer changes his version of events ===
Brehmer's version of events appeared to change on what he told police and a prison officer. Whilst in the ambulance at the time of the incident, Brehmer continued to state that it was Parry who had stabbed him. However, the next day, whilst at Salisbury Hospital for treatment, Brehmer stated that he thought he may have stabbed himself, trying to end his life.

In May 2020, Brehmer told police during interview that Parry had refused to get out of the car.

However, on 13 July, whilst on remand in prison, Brehmer told a prison officer a different version of events to that of what he had told police in May, that he had been arguing with Parry in the car and that she was angry, wanting to tell his wife about the affair. Brehmer told the prison officer that he thought it was more appropriate if he was to tell his wife. Brehmer then said that Parry went to get out of the car but that he had tried to stop her by pulling her back in, putting his arm around her neck.

=== Guilty plea to manslaughter ===
In July 2020, Brehmer pleaded guilty to manslaughter at a trial and preparation hearing. The prosecution rejected his plea and sought a trial for murder. A trial was set for Monday 19 October 2020.

=== Brehmer dismissed from Dorset Police for gross misconduct ===
On 16 September, Brehmer was dismissed for gross misconduct in relation to killing Parry, after a misconduct hearing held by Dorset Police. He was placed on the national police barred list by the College of Policing. Brehmer had continued to be paid until 16 September, as an officer's pay can only be stopped when they are formally dismissed, as per the Police (Conduct) Regulations 2020 and the Police Reform Act 2002. In a statement, Dorset Police said "As soon as Timothy Brehmer entered his guilty plea at court, fast-track misconduct proceedings were commenced and a hearing was held at the first available opportunity, which resulted in him being dismissed as soon as was practical."

== Trial ==
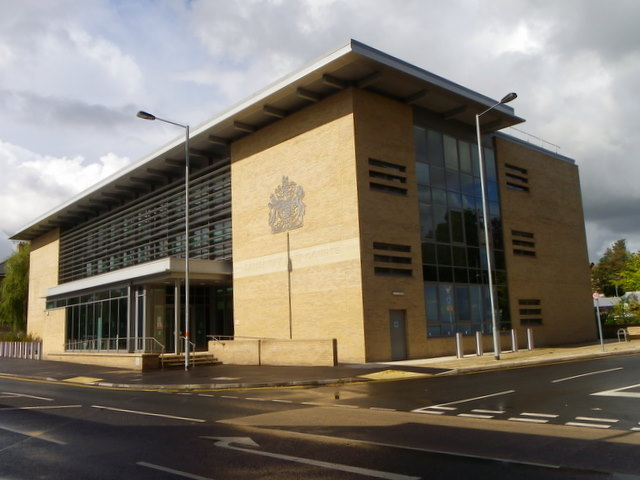
Salisbury Crown Court

The trial was held at Salisbury Crown Court, starting on Monday 19 October 2020, and lasted 12 days. The presiding judge was the Honourable Mr Justice Richard Jacobs, with Richard Smith KC as prosecutor and Ms Joanna Martin KC representing Brehmer. The jury consisted of nine women and three men.

Brehmer plead guilty to manslaughter, but denied murder.

=== Prosecution case ===
Opening the Crown's case on Monday 19 October 2020, Richard Smith KC explained that Parry and Brehmer had been having an affair 'for some time'. He explained that Parry was upset and angry with Brehmer, which appeared to be from the affair falling apart. Parry had threatened to reveal the affair to Brehmer's wife, which resulted in Brehmer strangling Parry after an argument, breaking a bone in her neck.

The jury were told by Mr Smith that they needed to determine what took place on the day Parry was killed and whether it was a case of murder or manslaughter.

Whilst Brehmer explained that he did not deliberately strangle Parry, but instead was trying to get her out of the car after the argument, Mr Smith stated that Brehmer had tried to diminish his responsibility and had lied about what had happened. It was the prosecution's case that Brehmer had angrily strangled Parry to death.

Mr Smith stated that the comments Brehmer made in prison compared with his police interview was an 'unguarded' moment in which Brehmer described what actually happened within the car.

Mr Smith concluded the Crown's case by explaining that whilst Brehmer had pleaded guilty to manslaughter, going too far in pushing and pulling her in the cabin of the car, but did not intend to cause serious injury or kill her, it was the Crown's case that Brehmer had intended to cause Parry very serious injury, if not kill her by deliberately taking hold of her around her neck.

=== Defence case ===
The defence case opened on Tuesday 20 October 2020 by Joanna Martin KC. Brehmer told the court that Parry had relentlessly messaged him for the previous two days and that he agreed to meet her after this. He said that Parry had found out he'd had an affair with another woman previously and that she was angry with 'uncontrolled jealousy'. Brehmer stated that he was going to end his life, feeling that he did not have anyone to talk to and that he could not face being rejected by his family. Brehmer stated that Parry asked to check through his social media on his phone. He explained that Parry was being 'snide' and 'nasty', 'taking the mickey' out of him.

Brehmer stated that Parry did not care when he stabbed his arm with a penknife. After this, Brehmer stated that Parry refused to get out of his car when he demanded she did, resulting in him trying to pull her out. During this, he stated that he 'bundled' back into the vehicle in an attempt to get her out the car and that his arm 'must have slipped up in all the melee'. Brehmer stated that after this, he left the car not realising that Parry was 'poorly'.

When asked by Ms Martin whether he planned to kill Parry, Brehmer stated that he did not intend to hurt her in any way.

Later in the trial, Brehmer's character references that were previously read to the court, in which Brehmer was described as 'reliable, generous and loving'.

=== Brehmer provides evidence ===
Brehmer explained how the relationship started between Parry and him and that it had continued for a number of years, on and off. He agreed that he had spoken twice to Parry's husband and that he had given the same story Parry had given to him. Brehmer stated that everything was fine between him and Parry on 6 May when they met, but that things went 'bonkers' on 7 and 8 May 2020.

When cross examined by Mr Smith, Brehmer accepted being a 'well-practised liar', after initially denying this. This was after admitting he had lied 'consistently well' to his wife about the affair with Parry. Brehmer denied that he fatally injured Parry after she sent his wife a text message, after being 'enraged' about what was happening in that moment. Brehmer denied that he was angry because Parry laughed at him when he tried to reset his phone or made snide remarks. He further denied that stabbing himself was to create a pretence that he had been stabbed. He denied that he had strangled Parry due to being enraged about what she had done.

Brehmer stated that it was 'not true' that he lied in order to cover up what he had done and he was cowardly, not being able to accept the truth of what he had done. Brehmer stated that he did not know why he said Parry had stabbed him, before changing his story, explaining that he was not trying to create a self-defence case by saying Parry was responsible for stabbing him.

=== Summing up of the case by Judge Jacobs ===
In his summing up, Judge Jacobs told the jury to put emotion aside and approach their decision with objectivity. He told the jury that the prosecution did not suggest that this was a premeditated murder. He reminded the jury to the prosecution referring to Brehmer lying about Parry stabbing him and the comments Brehmer made about going to prison for 'a very long time'. He told the jury that the prosecution stated that Brehmer knew he had fatally injured Parry, stating that the prosecution say the aftermath told what happened before.

Judge Jacobs referred to the defence saying Brehmer had been in a state of 'mental turmoil' throughout the day from Parry's bombardment of messages. He stated that the defence said that when Brehmer was speaking to the Bartlett's and paramedics, that he was not thinking rationally and that his interview the next day provided a detailed account that checked out. He stated that the defence said that it showed an accurate account had been given by Brehmer of what had happened. He said that the defence were saying that Brehmer was telling the truth or that the jury could not be sure he was not telling them the truth.

Judge Jacobs then summarised the evidence that the jury had heard, including the pathologists report from Dr Jeffery, from witnesses at the scene and afterwards.

== Verdict ==
On 28 October 2020, the jury returned to give their verdict after two hours and fifty minutes of deliberations. The 12-person jury unanimously found him not guilty of murder. Brehmer had previously admitted causing Parry's death but had denied murder.

== Sentence ==
Prior to sentence, Ms Martin talked through sentencing guidance with Judge Jacobs, stating that Brehmer should be sentenced based on his guilty plea of manslaughter and that he was telling the truth. She stated that the struggle in the vehicle did not carry a high risk of death or serious injury, although admitting that what Parry went through at the time of the incident 'must have been terrifying'. She explained that it was the defence's case that Brehmer was not acting rationally on the day of the incident when he stated that Parry had stabbed him. She stated that it would not be right when considering the verdict for manslaughter that Brehmer deliberately lied, which it would be in respect of murder, which was the Crown's case.

Ms Martin reiterated what Brehmer had stated, that he did not want Parry to be dead and that Brehmer recognised the 'distress and despair' that he had caused others. She said she hoped that the judge accepted Brehmer's remorse as 'genuine' and that the incident would live with him past any sentence. Ms Martin stated that the 168 days that Brehmer had spent in custody should be deducted from the sentence.

On 28 October 2020, Judge Jacobs sentenced Brehmer to 10 1/2 years in prison. He said that Brehmer would serve two-thirds of his sentence before being eligible for parole.

Judge Jacobs said that after Parry sent a text to Brehmer's wife revealing the affair, he was 'sure' that Brehmer intended to take Parry by the neck.

Judge Jacobs told Brehmer that 'it must have been obvious' to him that Parry was not breathing, given that he was a trained police officer. Despite this, he stated that Brehmer 'did nothing to try and help' Parry, not even asking how she was, because Brehmer 'knew how she was'.

Branding Brehmer a 'well-practised liar', Parry's husband responded to the verdict, saying he was 'incredibly disappointed'. He had previously told the court about the pain of having to tell their children that Parry was dead, describing Brehmer as the 'worst kind of thief'.

== Sentence appeals ==
Brehmer's sentence was referred under the Unduly Lenient Sentence (ULS) scheme to the Court of Appeal by the Solicitor General Michael Ellis QC MP. In November 2020, Brehmer himself filed an application to appeal the length of his sentence.

Brehmer's sentence was found to be unduly lenient by the Court of Appeal, who on 19 March 2021 increased his sentence to 13 years and 6 months.
