= Leonard Burt =

Leonard Burt can refer to:

- Leonard Burt (born 1892), British police commander in the Metropolitan Police
- Leonard Burt (born 1932), British policeman known for Operation Countryman and the discovery of the Portland spy ring
