= Anthony Castro =

Anthony Castro may refer to:

- Anthony Castro (baseball), professional baseball player
- Tony Castro, yacht designer
- Antonio Castro, murder victim in the 1978 Daily Mirror robbery in London
