= Murder of Thomas Roberts =

2022 murder in Bournemouth, England

Thomas Roberts
- Born: Thomas George Philip Roberts; England
- Died: 13 March 2022; Bournemouth, Dorset, England
- Cause of death: Stabbing
- Known for: Drum and Bass DJ
- Partner: Gemma Walker
- Parent: Dolores Wallace (Mother) Philip Roberts (Father) Peter Wallace (Stepfather)
- Relatives: Patti Roberts (Sister)

On 12 March 2022, 21-year-old Thomas Roberts of Bournemouth, Dorset, England, was stabbed to death by Lawangeen Abdulrahimzai during an argument between Abdulrahimzai and Roberts' friend over an e-scooter in Bournemouth town centre.

Abdulrahimzai admitted committing manslaughter, but denied murder. On 23 January, he was convicted of murder and sentenced to life imprisonment with a minimum term of 29 years.

== Background ==
=== Thomas Roberts ===
Thomas George Philip Roberts was a 21-year-old man from Bournemouth, Dorset. Growing up, he was a Sea Scout. Roberts, a qualified precision engineer, was described as an "active sportsman" who enjoyed mountain biking and boxing and was a member of the Christchurch Boxing Club. In his spare time, Roberts was a drum and bass DJ. Performing as "Nomad", he was described as "one of the best up-and-coming artists the South had to offer". Roberts had applied to join the Royal Marines.

=== Lawangeen Abdulrahimzai ===
Lawangeen Abdulrahimzai
- Born: Afghanistan
- Known for: Murder of three people, including Tom Roberts
- Criminal charges: Murder
- Penalty: Life imprisonment with a minimum of 29 years
- Time at large: 45 hours

Details
- Victims: 3
- Weapons: Knife and Kalashnikov rifle
- Date apprehended: 13 March 2022
- Imprisoned at: 25 January 2023

Lawangeen Abdulrahimzai was born in Afghanistan in 2001. From about the age of four he played cricket and, growing up, he used to train in boxing with his father. Abdulrahimzai's parents sold alcohol that they brewed on the black market, with Abdulrahimzai delivering it. Abdulrahimzai's parents were killed by the Taliban, who placed bombs outside their home. The Taliban thought that Abdulrahimzai's father was working with the United States and was illegally selling alcohol. Abdulrahimzai said that he was tortured by the Taliban after he was kidnapped and had scars after being stabbed 28 times, with injuries inflicted by rifle butts and knives. Abdulrahimzai was stabbed four times under his arms and shot in the leg by the Taliban. After being thrown to the side of a road, Abdulrahimzai's uncle arranged for him to be taken from Afghanistan to Pakistan, Iran, and other countries.

Before October 2015 Abdulrahimzai left Afghanistan and moved illegally across many international borders, initially through Pakistan and Iran and then between Norway and Italy before arriving in Serbia in October 2015. By 29 October of that year Abdulrahimzai was in Norway, where authorities took his fingerprints. Abdulrahimzai said that he travelled from Serbia to Norway by walking or riding in the back of cars. By July 2016, after leaving Norway, Abdulrahimzai was in Italy. From there he returned to Serbia, where he was recorded on 26 June 2017 with a different name.

On 31 July 2018, Abdulrahimzai used a Kalashnikov rifle to kill two Afghan men and was convicted in absentia of two counts of murder. After leaving Serbia, he returned to Norway in October 2018 and made a claim for asylum the following year. In December 2019, it was rejected; that month he illegally entered the United Kingdom via the Port of Poole and claimed asylum, pretending in a Home Office interview to be an unaccompanied 14-year-old. He was issued a date of birth of 2005, but it was later determined that he was actually 18 years old at the time.

Abdulrahimzai moved to Poole, Dorset, England, where he was placed in foster care. Abdulrahimzai played cricket for Winton and attended a boxing club. He became involved in organised street fighting, where he was paid £100 for 10 minutes of fighting without gloves. He reportedly got into fights at school and in public, and said that he was racially abused and physically assaulted.

His foster mother caught Abdulrahimzai with a knife, which she took from him before ensuring that the knives in the house were locked away. She said that Abdulrahimzai thought it was "his right to carry a knife to defend himself".

He continued to carry a knife, despite police warnings. In November 2020, Abdulrahimzai was the victim of an assault in King's Park, Bournemouth, where he was bitten, stabbed in the eyebrow, and punched by multiple people. He said that he had been chased by people with machetes in the park. Abdulrahimzai said that he reported every assault to the police, but they did not help him. The police had been unable to investigate the King's Park assault because Abdulrahimzai would not provide details about one of the people who punched him. In December 2020, Abdulrahimzai carried a knife while shopping because he feared for his life after being tortured in Afghanistan and attacked in the UK.

His first foster mother described Abdulrahimzai as a "very troubled individual", saying that he had "seen things he should never have seen" growing up in "a world at war" and "his default is to fight". She described Abdulrahimzai's behaviour as "a bit Jekyll and Hyde" near the end of his time with her family, noting that his mood could go "from 0 to 100 almost instantly" and he had made her adult daughter cry.

In August 2021, Abdulrahimzai had a "big disagreement" with his foster mother which required police attendance. After this, he moved to a new foster family. By March 2022, Abdulrahimzai was living in hostels.

== Incident ==
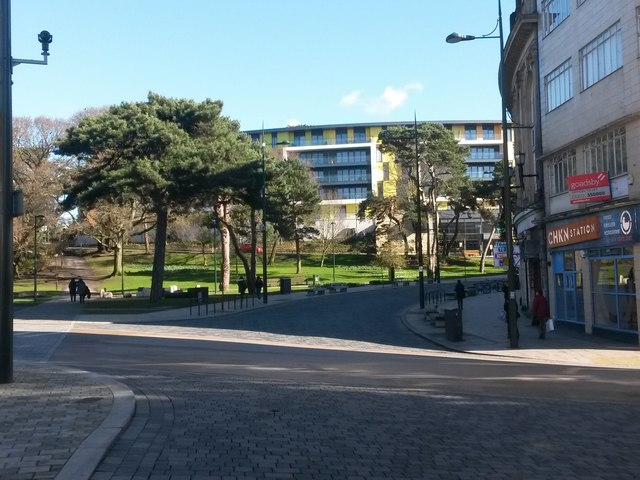
The vicinity of the murder. Horseshoe Common is the green space on the left, with Old Christchurch Road leading into the distance. The Subway where Roberts was murdered is around the corner.

Roberts was in Bournemouth town centre with friends on Friday, 11 March 2022, and visited pubs and venues across the town. During the early hours of Saturday, 12 March, two of his friends went home; Roberts and his friend, James Medway, decided to stay out. CCTV footage showed them leaving For Your Eyes Only on Old Christchurch Road, near the corner of Fir Vale Road, with a plan to get some food before taking a taxi home.

Abdulrahimzai was in Bournemouth town centre, in the vicinity of Fir Vale Road, with a friend at approximately 3 am. He had a knife, which he later said was because he "was in fear". At 3:08 am Abdulrahimzai went into the London Market shop on Old Christchurch Road, where he bought a Monster Energy drink and a Bounty chocolate bar before standing outside the Camel Bar at 3:10 am. He had a fake ID, which was confiscated by security at the venue because it did not have the correct numbers. It was reported that for about an hour, Abdulrahimzai had been abusing the door staff at the bar. Before Roberts' murder, Abdulrahimzai was involved in an argument with two men unrelated to Roberts and tried to headbutt someone.

At 4:37 am, Abdulrahimzai was seen riding a hired Beryl e-scooter and leaving it outside a Subway. Roberts and Medway were walking to a taxi rank on Old Christchurch Road. At 4:39 am, as they passed the Wild Fish and Chip Shop, Medway gestured to the e-scooter leaning against the window of a Subway and suggested to Roberts that they could use it instead of getting a taxi. At approximately 4:40 am, as Medway positioned himself on either side of the scooter, he and Roberts were approached by Abdulrahimzai. Abdulrahimzai argued with Medway, saying that the e-scooter was his. He was aggressive to Roberts, who intervened as a "peacemaker". Roberts tried to calm the situation, telling Abdulrahimzai to "relax, there's no problem here". Abdulrahimzai turned his attention from Medway to Roberts, becoming threatening. At one point, Roberts slapped Abdulrahimzai in the face.

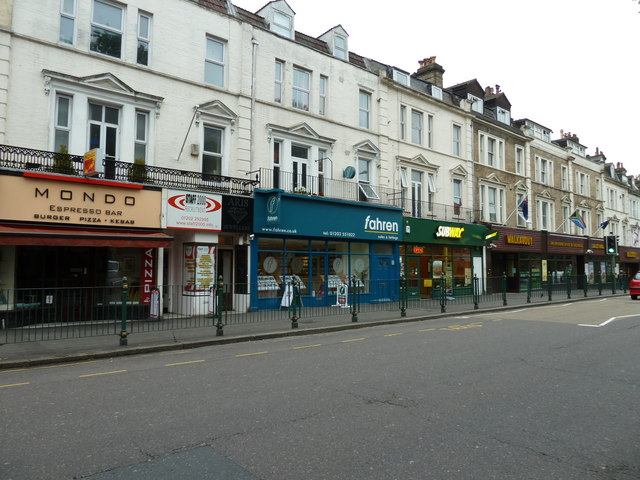
Old Christchurch Road, Bournemouth, with the Subway where Roberts was stabbed

At about 4:44 am, Abdulrahimzai produced a 10-inch gold-handled knife he had been carrying in a sheath on the right side of his body, tucked into the waistband of his two pairs of trousers. He lunged at Roberts, stabbing him in the chest and abdomen. Roberts remained on his feet, while Abdulrahimzai ran onto Horseshoe Common. Medway asked Roberts if he was okay before pursuing Abdulrahimzai to try to retrieve the knife. After losing sight of Abdulrahimzai and being unable to catch up with him, Medway returned to Roberts.

Abdulrahimzai dug a hole in the ground, buried the knife in some bushes, and later burned the clothes he had been wearing. Roberts had collapsed and was attended to by members of the public, who called an ambulance and attempted to manage his profusely-bleeding injuries. The police were the first to arrive, and conducted CPR. When an ambulance arrived, Roberts was unconscious and in cardiac arrest.

Roberts was rushed to Poole Hospital, where he underwent immediate surgery. He went into cardiac arrest several times, but no medical intervention could save him from the injuries he had sustained (later confirmed by a pathologist as resulting in unsurvivable blood loss). At 8:10 am on Sunday 13 March, Roberts was pronounced dead during surgery at the hospital. From the moment Abdulrahimzai approached Roberts to the stabbing, 26 seconds had passed.

== Investigation and legal proceedings ==
=== Police investigation ===
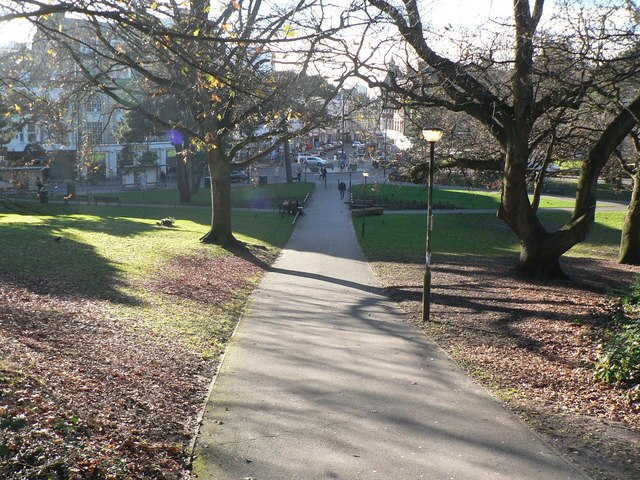
Horseshoe Common (looking towards Old Christchurch Road), where Abdulrahimzai fled after stabbing Roberts and where his iPhone was later found by police

On the morning of 12 March 2022, Abdulrahimzai's phone (an Apple iPhone 6s) was found by police searching Horseshoe Common. He had dropped it while fleeing the scene. Officers traced Abdulrahimzai's address at Quay Foyer in Poole, Dorset, where firearms officers arrested him on suspicion of murder just after midnight on 13 March.

Abdulrahimzai was taken into custody at the Bournemouth police station. As he was booked, Abdulrahimzai said he felt "guilty". The following day, during an interview, it was established that he felt guilty about what his foster family might think. During several police interviews Abdulrahimzai remained silent, saying that he did so on advice from his solicitor. His age was uncertain, but assessments determined that he was 20 years old at the time of the incident. The knife was never recovered.

=== Post-mortem and inquest ===
Dr. Amanda Jeffery conducted a post-mortem on Roberts at Holly Tree Lodge, Boscombe. Jeffery said that Roberts had received "sharp-force stab wounds", "penetrating wounds caused by a sharp-bladed object".

The upper wound to Roberts' chest was four centimetres long at the skin. The knife penetrated Roberts' chest wall, cutting through skin and muscle before entering the chest cavity and damaging his ribs as it passed between the seventh and eighth ribs. The defect in Roberts' ribs was 2.5 centimetres wide. The blade also cut across the diaphragm, damaging the left lobe of his left lung and affecting the side of the sac surrounding the heart. The depth of the wound was 10 centimetres from the skin to the deepest part of the injury. Jeffery said that the rib damage indicated that the minimum amount of force used was "moderate" on a scale of mild to severe.

The injury to Roberts' lower abdomen was 3.5 centimetres long. The blade penetrated the torso muscles into the back of the abdomen, below the rib cage. It sliced across the lower part of Roberts' left kidney and opened the left renal vein before entering the space behind the stomach. The blade also left a "small nick" in one of the loops of the small bowel. The length of this wound was similar to Roberts' other wound, but the minimum amount of force used was considered "mild"; however, Jeffery said that "greater forces may have been involved".

The pathologist reported that the knife must have been "10 centimetres or more in length, with a width of 3.5 to 4 centimetres at the 10-centimetre point". According to Jeffery, both injuries suggested that the blade had "one cutting edge and one blunt edge".

An inquest into Roberts' death was opened at Bournemouth Coroner's Court, led by Dorset senior coroner Rachael Griffin, on 21 March 2022. The inquest was suspended due to the ongoing police investigation.

=== Charge and remand in custody ===
On 15 March, Abdulrahimzai was charged with murder. He was remanded in custody after appearing at Poole Magistrates' Court the following day. On 17 March, Abdulrahimzai appeared at a brief hearing at Winchester Crown Court via video link from Feltham Young Offenders Institution. Judge Angela Morris scheduled a plea and trial-preparation hearing for 9 June. On 9 June, Abdulrahimzai pleaded not guilty to the murder charge and guilty to manslaughter.

== Trial ==
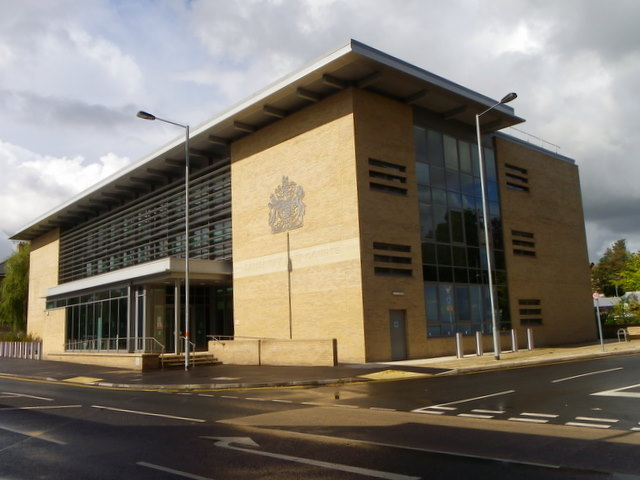
Salisbury Crown Court (photo by Maigheach-gheal)

Abdulrahimzai's trial began on 11 January 2023 at Salisbury Crown Court. The presiding judge was Paul Dudgale. The prosecutors were Nic Lobbenberg KC and Ellie Fargin; Jo Martin KC and her junior, Nick Robinson, were the defence barristers.

Opening the prosecution's case, Lobbenberg told the jury that Abdulrahimzai had already pleaded guilty to manslaughter. He said that although Abdulrahimzai admitted that he killed Roberts, the Crown contended that it was murder and was "about the circumstances". There were two issues: "intent" and Abdulrahimzai's "loss of control". Roberts' body had no defensive injuries, and Lobbenberg said that one of Roberts' lungs and the left ventricle of his heart were damaged by the stab wound to his chest.

Giving evidence, Abdulrahimzai admitted stabbing Roberts and said that he did not intend to kill him or cause him serious harm. According to Abdulrahimzai, he told Medway to get off the scooter before Medway "tried to act violently". He said that Roberts slapped him and then punched him in the nose, and Abdulrahimzai was frightened when Roberts and Medway looked each other in the eyes; he "lost control" and "instinctively" stabbed Roberts. Abdulrahimzai added that he believed Medway and Roberts were there to kill him, thinking that "the terrorists have a lot of people involved in what they do". He said that he did not know Roberts was injured, and the only reason he ran was because he thought Medway (who was carrying his trainers after his laces became undone) was chasing him with a bottle.

Abdulrahimzai said that he obtained the knife from a friend, and the knife with which he had been photographed was the one he used to stab Roberts; the image was on TikTok "to try and get some followers". He said he carried a knife for his "safety", believing that it was the only way to protect himself since he had not received help from the police. He said that he would use the knife if people from "back home" were behind him.

Abdulrahimzai reportedly experienced nightmares about the Taliban being "out to kill him"; according to one report, he had flashbacks which made it "hard for him to know if he is in the past or present". A 3 August 2021 report from the Child and Adolescent Mental Health Services (CAMHS) identified areas of need, including flashbacks and trust issues, and noted that Abdulrahimzai's moods could change. According to the report, Abdulrahimzai was "very vigilant" and believed that "he is better than everyone".

Forensic psychiatrist Gauruv Malhan testified that he did not believe Abdulrahimzai had simple or complex post-traumatic stress disorder (PTSD), but exhibited traits of both. Malhan said that Abdulrahimzai met the diagnostic criteria for borderline personality disorder (BPD) and met some, but not all, diagnostic criteria for dissocial personality disorder.

== Verdict and sentencing ==
Following a two-week trial, the jury returned a 10–2 verdict finding Abdulrahimzai guilty of murder. A minimum term of 25 years was agreed upon as the starting point.

After Abdulrahimzai was convicted of murdering Roberts, the court was informed that he had previously been convicted of murder for killing two people in Serbia with a Kalashnikov rifle on 31 July 2018. Abdulrahimzai had used the name Huan Yasin, and was wanted by Serbian authorities. It was believed that the previous murders were related to human trafficking. Abdulrahimzai was sentenced to 20 years in prison in absentia. Since the previous murders were committed outside the UK or an EU country, they were not legally considered "qualifying offences". They could be regarded as aggravating factors, however, and Judge Dugdale confirmed that he had to take the previous conviction into account.

On 25 January 2023, Abdulrahimzai was sentenced to life imprisonment with a minimum term of 29 years. Dudgale told Abdulrahimzai that he had acted with "unjustified extreme violence."

== Aftermath ==
=== Government and council response ===
In response to a question in the House of Commons from Bournemouth East MP Tobias Ellwood before Abdulrahimzai's sentencing, Home Office Minister Robert Jenrick said that there would be a government investigation to establish the "full circumstances surrounding the case". After Bournemouth West MP Conor Burns raised the case in the Commons, Jenrick added that Abdulrahimzai could be deported at the end of his sentence. Bournemouth, Christchurch and Poole Council released a statement that local communities "are not at risk from asylum seekers".

=== Pre-inquest review of Roberts' death ===
A pre-inquest review of Roberts' death was held on 9 August 2023. The inquest heard that Abdulrahimzai had been referred to Prevent, the Home Office's anti-terrorism programme, due to concerns that he might be susceptible to terrorism. A review of Abdulrahimzai's referral to the programme was begun.

A review of the Home Office's role in processing Abdulrahimzai's immigration status had been completed but would remain confidential due to the need to keep immigration procedures, described as "highly sensitive", restricted.

The Home Office was criticised by Coroner Rachael Griffin because Roberts' father, Philip, had not received any information about the reviews of Abdulrahimzai or Home Office involvement. He asked Griffin to check with Dorset Police about previous reports they had received about Abdulrahimzai having a knife days before Roberts' murder.

Griffin asked Bournemouth, Christchurch and Poole Council to provide information on their age-assessment checks for Abdulrahimzai and asked Dorset Police to supply files from the investigations, including any internal reviews. The inquest into Roberts' death was adjourned until a hearing scheduled for 9 January 2024.

On 22 July 2024, it was reported that the inquest had been adjourned again until the following month for Griffin to determine whether it would continue. Griffin ruled on 4 September 2024 that there was "no need" for a full inquest into the circumstances surrounding Roberts's death, noting that the criteria for such an inquest had not been met under Article 2 of the European Convention of Human Rights: if the state knew (or ought to have known) of an immediate risk to an individual's life, it must take reasonable steps to deal with the risk.
