= Arthur Hambleton =

Chief Constable of Dorset Police

Arthur Hambleton

Arthur Hambleton (29 October 1915 – 10 October 2012) was a police officer in Dorset Police. He is notable for his involvement in Operation Countryman.

Hambleton was born in Leeds on 29 October 1915. He was one of 12 children. He left school at 16, and worked, at his father's behest, at a butcher's shop. He did so for six years before, in 1937, he joined West Riding Police, the police force which at the time covered the West Riding of Yorkshire. He served with the force until 1942, when he joined the Royal Marines. He became an officer in 1943, and was mentioned in dispatches, eventually becoming a captain.

In March 1945 he fought in a battle to take the Küsten Canal, suffering multiple wounds to the head and buttocks. He refused to be evacuated, and was awarded the Military Cross as a result.

After rejoining the police in 1945, he worked his way up through the ranks, eventually becoming assistant chief constable in Cardiff. He joined Dorset Police in 1962, and worked his way up to chief constable of that force, receiving an Order of the British Empire in 1971 and Commander of the Order of the British Empire in 1977. He was appointed as a Knight of the Most Venerable Order of Hospital of Saint John of Jerusalem.

He was particularly notable for heading up one of the first major corruption investigations into the Metropolitan Police, Operation Countryman, before retiring in February 1980.

Hambleton died in 2012 and is buried at St Laurence's Church, Upwey.
