= Peter Matthews (police officer) =

Sir Peter Jack Matthews (25 December 1917 – 6 January 2003) was a British police officer who rose to become chief constable of Suffolk Constabulary and the Surrey Police.

He was born at Blackridge, West Lothian, Scotland and educated at Blackridge Public School.

In 1937 he joined the Metropolitan Police, but during the Second World War was commissioned into the RAF in 1942 and flew as a pilot until demobilisation in 1946 with the rank of flight-lieutenant. He then returned to the Metropolitan Police to continue his career, rising to chief inspector in the early 1950s, and chief instructor at the Metropolitan Police Dog Training Establishment at Keston, Kent. Around that time he was seconded to the Cyprus Police, with a team of policemen and a pack of Alsatian dogs, with the task of detecting buried arms and ammunition during the EOKA crisis of 1955.

On his return to England he was appointed chief superintendent in charge of "P" Division, with headquarters at Catford. In 1965 he became Chief Constable of East Suffolk, and briefly continued as chief constable of Suffolk when the East Suffolk force merged with the West Suffolk and Ipswich forces in 1967 to create a single county constabulary.

In 1968 he was appointed chief constable of Surrey, a position he held until his retirement in 1982. During that time he took over as head of Operation Countryman, a major investigation into police corruption in the Metropolitan Police, from Assistant Chief Constable Leonard Burt of the Dorset Constabulary.

== Honours and awards ==

- 1970: Awarded Queen's Police Medal
- 1974: Appointed Officer of the Order of the British Empire (OBE)
- 1978: Appointed Commander of the Royal Victorian Order (CVO)
- 1981: Knighted
- 1981: Appointed a Deputy Lieutenant of Surrey

== Private life ==
He married, in 1944, Margaret Levett; they had one son.
