= Dorset Police =

English territorial police force

- Motto: A safe county for everyone

Agency overview
- Formed: 1 April 1974; 52 years ago
- Preceding agencies: Dorset County Constabulary; Bournemouth Borough Police; Dorset and Bournemouth Constabulary
- Employees: 3,071
- Annual budget: £179.1 million (2023/24)

Jurisdictional structure
- Operations jurisdiction: Dorset, England, United Kingdom
- Map of police area
- Area: 1,024 square miles (2,650 km^{2})
- Population: 774,000
- Legal jurisdiction: England & Wales
- Constituting instrument: Police Act 1996
- General nature: Local civilian police

Operational structure
- Overseen by: His Majesty's Inspectorate of Constabulary and Fire & Rescue Services; Independent Office for Police Conduct
- Headquarters: Winfrith
- Constables: 1,383 (of which 111 are special constables)
- Police Community Support Officers: 123
- Police and crime commissioner responsible: David Sidwick, (I)
- Agency executive: Amanda Pearson, chief constable

Facilities
- Stations: 24

Notables
- Anniversary: 50 years of Dorset Police (1 April 2024)

Website
- www.dorset.police.uk

Dorset Police is the territorial police force responsible for policing the ceremonial county of Dorset in South West England. The force covers an area of 1,024 square miles (2,650 km^{2}) with a population of 774,000.

== History ==
Dorset County Constabulary was formed in 1856. In 1965, it had an establishment of 544 and an actual strength of 466. On 1 October 1967, it merged with Bournemouth Borough Police to form Dorset and Bournemouth Constabulary.

On 1 April 1974, this force took over some areas (mainly Christchurch and its hinterland) from Hampshire Constabulary and acquired its present name of Dorset Police.

=== Chief constables ===
==== Dorset Constabulary ====
- 1924–1955 Peel Yates
- 1955–1962 Ronald Berry Greenwood
- 1962–1967 Arthur Hambleton

==== Dorset and Bournemouth Constabulary ====
- 1967–1974 Arthur Hambleton

==== Dorset Police ====
- 1974–1980 Arthur Hambleton
- 1981–1982 David Owen
- 1982– 1995 Brian Weight
- 1995–1998 D. W. Aldous
- 1999–2004 Jane Stichbury
- 2005–2012 Martin Baker
- 2012–2018 Debbie Simpson
- 2018–2021 James Vaughan
- 2021–2023 Scott Chilton
- 2023–present Amanda Pearson

Chief Constable Amanda Pearson, started her role on 1 March 2023, after her predecessor Scott Chilton moved to the same role in Hampshire and Isle of Wight Constabulary. She is the third female chief constable of Dorset Police, after Jane Stichbury and Debbie Simpson. Pearson started her policing career in 1993 and has worked at Hampshire and Isle of Wight Constabulary, Hertfordshire Constabulary, the City of London Police and Thames Valley Police, before joining the Metropolitan Police, where she worked as a Chief Officer. Whilst here, Pearson was the spokesperson for the Metropolitan Police's tactic of officers being able to knock moped thieves off their bikes. Pearson was also the programme lead for the Police Plan of Action on Inclusion and Race, a role in which in 2021, she stated that she had 'never seen' an officer being racist, whilst she was working in the Metropolitan Police.

== Governance ==
Dorset Police was formerly responsible to the Dorset Police Authority, which was replaced in 2012 by the elected Dorset Police and Crime Commissioner (PCC). The first PCC was independent Martyn Underhill, who served between 22 November 2012 and 12 May 2021. As of May 2021, the PCC is David Sidwick, who represents the Conservative Party. As of 2025 the government has planned to remove all PCCs by 2028

== Police area and other forces ==
The force covers an area of 1,024 square miles (2,650 km^{2}) with a population of 774,000, which increases in the tourist season. In 2022, Dorset Police received 121,798 emergency calls on 999.

In 2023, Dorset Police:

- Received 323,000 contacts from 999, 101, online and in person
- Attended 57,489 incidents
- Made 8,500 arrests
- Located 4,392 missing people

Officers in Dorset have legal jurisdiction throughout all of England and Wales, including areas that have their own special police forces, as do all police officers of territorial police forces (as per Section 30 of the Police Act 1996). Officers also have limited powers in Scotland and Northern Ireland (as per Section 137 of the Criminal Justice and Public Order Act 1994).

Other police services work alongside Dorset Police in the county. This includes the British Transport Police (BTP), who are responsible for policing of the rail network in Great Britain. Their office for Dorset is at Bournemouth railway station.

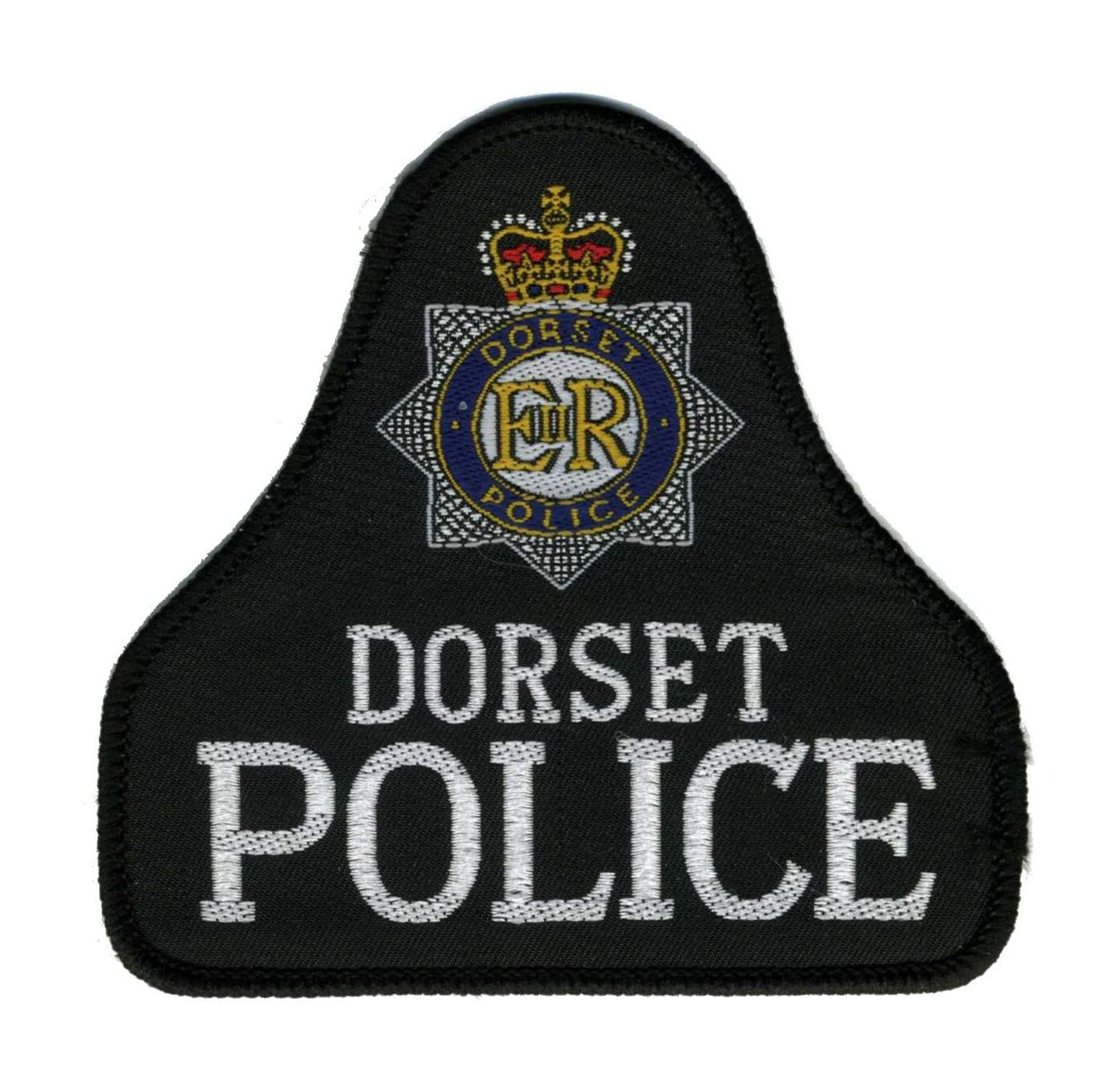
Dorset Police Patch

Port of Portland Police is a non-Home Office ports police force within Dorset that is responsible for the Port of Portland. In July 2020, the Port Police agreed a memorandum of understanding with Dorset Police to involve the sharing of assets, improving communication and allowing the collation of information.

== Operations ==
=== Air Operations Unit ===
Since 2014, air support has been provided by National Police Air Service (NPAS). Its nearest helicopter is based at Bournemouth Airport and also supports nearby police forces.

=== Criminal Investigation Department ===
Criminal Investigation Department (CID) provides advice to all policing units on crime-related matters and maintaining a corporate approach to reducing crime, as well as providing specialist and investigative roles. CID is split into numerous sub-departments, which include: Child Protect Investigation, Intelligence Directorate, Scientific Support.

=== Dog Section ===
The Dog Section was established in 1953; the unit is based in Eastern Division HQ in Ferndown. The unit comprises one inspector, one sergeant, 13 constables and 22 dogs, including general purpose German Shepherds and more specialist breeds.

=== Marine Policing Unit ===
The Marine Unit is responsible for policing the 89 miles of Dorset's coastline and up to 12 miles out to sea. The area is one of the busiest coastal areas in the UK, including two of the busiest ports, numerous shipping lanes, thousands of private moorings, the RNLI's busiest callout area and a training centre for the Royal Marines.

=== Ports Policing Unit ===
The Ports Policing Unit is responsible for policing all ports in Dorset including Poole Harbour, Swanage Harbour, Portland Harbour, Weymouth Harbour, Christchurch Harbour and Bournemouth Airport.

=== Roads Policing Unit ===
The force is responsible for policing road across the county. There are no motorways located within Dorset. Dorset Police have around 450 vehicles, from 20 different manufacturers, and drive a total of 7.5 million miles a year. The Roads Policing Unit (RPU) also features the No Excuse Team, launched in 2010, which aims to reduce deaths and serious injuries on Dorset roads; and the Interceptor Team, launched in 2023, which targets criminals using the road network within Dorset.

=== Tactical Firearms Unit ===
The Tactical Firearms Unit responds to major and serious crimes where firearms are involved.

== Locations ==
The force headquarters is at Winfrith. Police stations open to the public are located at Blandford, Bournemouth Central, Bridport, Gillingham, Poole, Sherborne, Swanage and Weymouth.

Stations without a public front desk are Boscombe, Dorchester, Ferndown, Shaftesbury, Sturminster Newton, Verwood, Wareham, Wimborne and Winton.

There are two custody suites at Bournemouth Central and Weymouth Police station.

In September 2017, the Christchurch Neighbourhood Policing Team moved to the fire station on Fairmile, further advancing the relationship with Dorset and Wiltshire Fire and Rescue Service.

Station	Public front desk	Custody suite	Notes
Blandford	✓		The front desk to the police station reopened on 27 March 2023
Boscombe			Closed in 2012, then again in 2016, the station reopened in October 2023 as an 'operational base' for officers
Boscombe Hub			Opened in late 2015 to station officers from the Boscombe Neighbourhood Policing Team (NPT)
Bournemouth	✓	✓	Opened in late 2010, the station and cells moved from the old site on the opposite side of the road, which closed in 2011
Beaminster			Beaminster Neighbourhood Policing Team (NPT), moved out of the station and into the community fire station in May 2016.
Bridport	✓		
Christchurch (now at the Fire Station)			The original Christchurch police station closed to the public on 1 March 2015 due to 'budget cuts'. The station closed fully in September 2017. Since that time, officers from Christchurch's Neighbourhood Policing Team (NPT) are based in an office situated below Christchurch Fire Station.
Dorchester			The original buildings of the station date to 1861. The front desk closed on 1 March 2015 due to 'budget cuts'.
Ferndown			In 2015, in a bid to save £700,000, Dorset Police attempted to sell Ferndown Police Station. The site was listed for £6 million, however, as of 2024, it has not been sold. The station, alongside Weymouth, it also is home to the Dog Section.
Gillingham	✓		
Highcliffe			Closed in 2011, replaced by residential housing.
Lyme Regis	✓		Open on Tuesdays and Thursdays, the front desk to the police station reopened on 30 May 2023
Poole	✓	✓*	After the station at the Civic Centre closed in 2009, the current station opened on 17 December 2009.*Whilst there is a custody suite, this closed in the summer of 2011, as part of cost-cutting measures. The cells are kept in a permanent state of readiness for times when there is high demand. Poole custody is used when Bournemouth custody undergoes a deep clean at the end of each year. Another police station in the Gravel Hill area of Poole closed in October 2012.
Shaftesbury			The front desk closed on 1 March 2015 due to 'budget cuts'.
Sherborne	✓		
Sturminster Newton			
Swanage	✓		Opened in 1899, the station closed to the public in 2012. The front desk reopened in August 2023.
Verwood			In an attempt to save £500,000, Verwood's front desk was closed in summer 2014.
Wareham			The front desk closed on 1 March 2015 due to 'budget cuts'.
Weymouth	✓	✓	The station, alongside Ferndown, is also home to the Dog Section.
Weymouth East			
Wimborne			In an attempt to save £500,000, Wimborne's front desk was closed in summer 2014.
Winton			The front desk closed on 1 March 2015 due to 'budget cuts'.

== Ranks ==
Dorset Police uses the standard British police ranks, indicated by epaulettes, up to chief constable. Special constable's collar numbers begin with either the number '3' or '4' and consist of four numbers.

=== Insignia ===
Dorset Police's officer rank structure, with epaulette design, is as follows (from highest to lowest):

Great Britain police ranks and insignia
Rank	Chief constable	Deputy chief constable	Assistant chief constable	Chief superintendent	Superintendent	Chief inspector	Inspector	Sergeant	Constable
Epaulette insignia									

== Uniforms and equipment ==
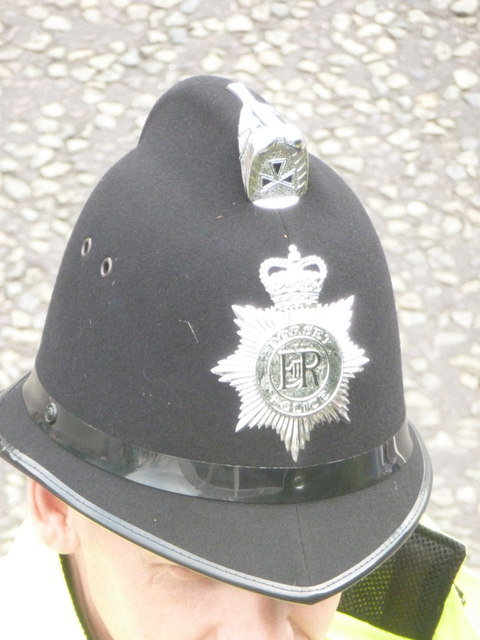
A Dorset Police officer in Ensbury Park, Bournemouth. Since 1863, the custodian helmet has been worn by male police constables and sergeants while on foot patrol.

=== Uniform ===
In 2012, Dorset Police officers moved from blue shirts to black wicking tops (PCSOs wear blue wicking tops). They either wear hi-visibility or black tactical vests on top of body armour.

=== Equipment ===
Dorset Police use Motorola MXP600 TETRA digital radios.They are equipped with Reveal D3 Body Cameras. They also use rigid handcuffs, limb restraints, telescopic batons and incapacitant spray.

Some officers carry the Conducted Energy Device (CED) Axon TASER, a non-lethal electroshock weapon used to incapacitate targets via shocks of 50,000 volts. As of 2021, there were 374 officers trained in using TASER.

Firearms officers carry rifles and a pistol as their sidearm.

Some officers are trained in the use of 'stinger' (also known as a spike strip), that slowly releases air from tyres of a vehicle when it goes over it.

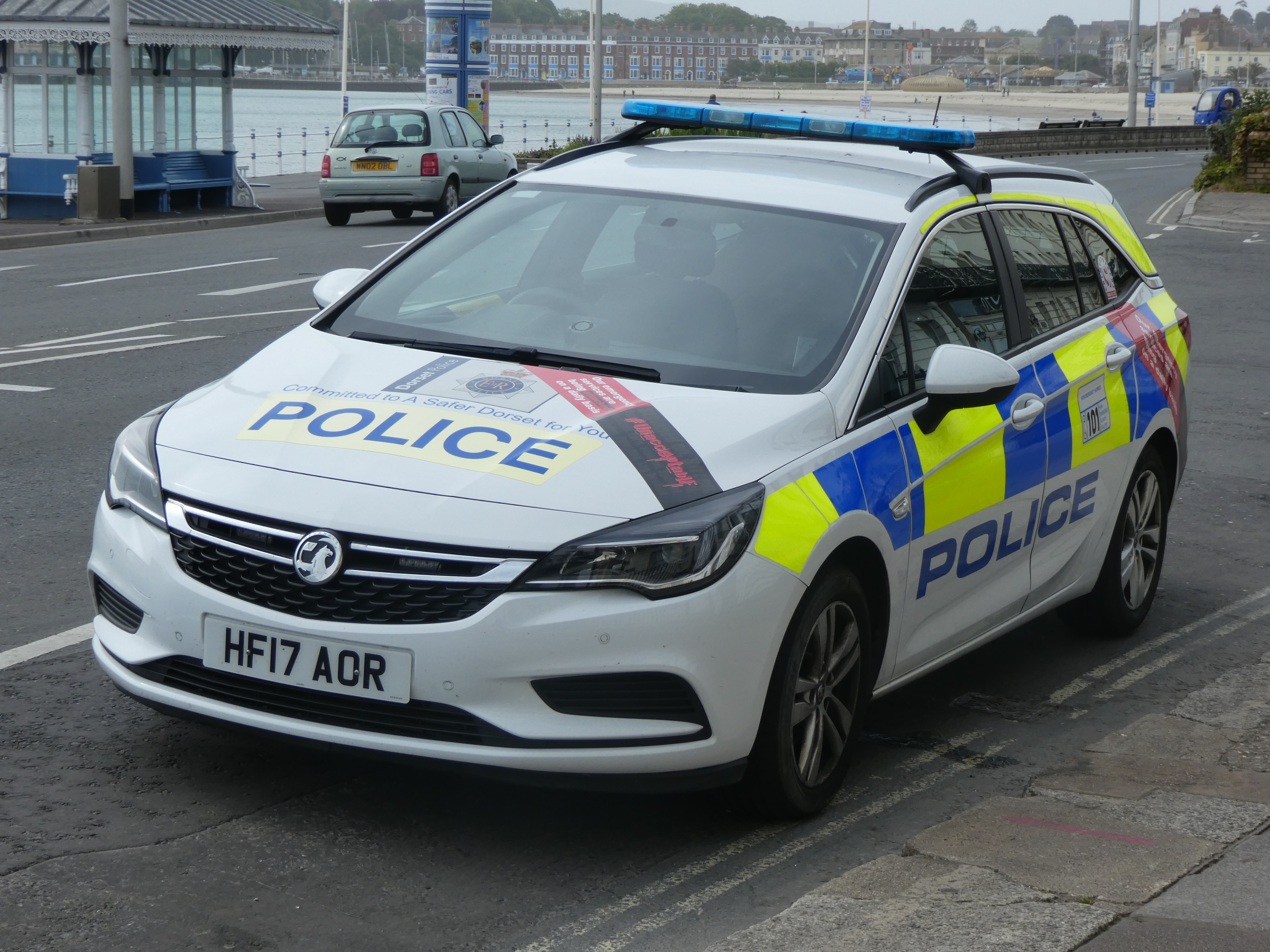
Vauxhall Astra pictured in 2020

=== Vehicles ===
Previously, Dorset Police Transport Services manage the force's 450 vehicles, across its divisional units, road policing unit, and armed response. However, in 2016, Dorset's Fleet Services aligned with Devon & Cornwall's as part of a proposed force merger. As a result, there are now seven workshops available across the three counties, and Dorset manages and maintains approximately 500 vehicles as part of 'Alliance Fleet Services'.

As of 2020, Dorset Police had 429 vehicles which included 338 cars, 83 vans and 8 motorcycles. Examples of the vehicle makes and models that Dorset Police have used or currently use include vehicles made by Vauxhall, Ford and Mercedes.

== Performance ==
=== British Crime Survey ===
The British Crime Survey for 2010 found that there was an overall fall in crime in Dorset by 2.5%, and the largest fall in crime was robbery, which fell by 20%, making Dorset Police the eighth best performing force out of 43 in England and Wales, and first in forces similar to Dorset.

The performance figures from Dorset Police comparing April to December 2009 with the same period during 2008, showed a 9.9% drop in burglary, an 8.5% drop in criminal damage, a 3.5% fall in vehicle crime, a 3% drop in total violent crime, and a 17.8% fall in the most serious violent crime. Criminal damage fell by 5.8%, violence against the person without injury by 9.3%, violence against the person by 5.2%, drug offences by 5.1% and there was a 2.8% fall in total recorded crime.

According to the British Crime Survey, 63.8% of people think Dorset Police deals with local concerns, making Dorset the best performing force in England and Wales for that issue.

Some 9.9% of people say there is a high level of perceived anti-social behaviour, making Dorset the eighth best performing force in England and Wales – and the top performing force among its family of five most similar forces. Some 17.6% of people said there was a big problem with drugs while 18.8% of people in Dorset said there was a big problem with drunk and rowdy behaviour. 51.6% of people in Dorset agreed that the police and local councils were dealing with issues, making Dorset the twelfth best performing force in England and Wales.

=== Her Majesty's Inspectorate of Constabulary ===
In 2010, Her Majesty's Inspectorate of Constabulary (Her Majesty's Inspectorate of Constabulary and Fire & Rescue Services since 2017) (HMICFRS) graded Dorset Police overall as 'fair' on local crime and policing, protection from serious harm, confidence and satisfaction. In detail they were graded as 'fair' at neighbourhood policing, neighbourhood presence and solving crime. They were rated as 'good' at reducing crime. They were graded 'excellent' at suppressing gun crime, suppressing knife crime, comparative satisfaction of the BME community, confidence in the police and proportion of police cost met by council. They were scored 'poor' and 'stable' on reducing road death and injury.

=== PEEL inspection ===
HMICFRS conducts a periodic police effectiveness, efficiency and legitimacy (PEEL) inspection of each police service's performance. This is judged as follows:

- Effectiveness: Reducing crime and keeping people safe
- Efficiency: How the force operates and how sustainable its services are to the public
- Legitimacy: How legitimately does the force treat the public and its workforce

In its latest PEEL inspections, Dorset Police were rated as follows (ungraded means that it wasn't given a score, not that it was necessarily un-markable):

Rating	Outstanding	Good	Adequate	Requires Improvement	Inadequate	Ungraded
Year	Outstanding	Good	Adequate	Requires Improvement	Inadequate	Ungraded
2014	_	Reducing crime and preventing offending; Tackling anti-social behaviour; Force is efficient; Steps taken to ensure a secure financial position for the short and long term; An affordable way of providing policing	_	Investigating offending	_	Protecting those at greatest risk of harm; Tackling serious, organised and complex crime; Meeting commitments under the Strategic Policing Requirement; Workforce acts with integrity; Public perceptions of the force; Responds to calls for service appropriately; Data and information provided by the force is of high quality
2015	_	Preventing crime, tackling anti-social behaviour and keeping people safe; Investigating crime and managing offenders; Protecting vulnerable people and supporting victims; Tackling serious and organised crime, including arrangement for fulfilling national policing responsibilities; Uses resources to meet demand; Practice and behaviour reinforce the wellbeing of staff and an ethical culture; Understands, engages with and treats members of the public fairly, maintaining and improving its legitimacy; Decisions taken to use stop and search and Taser are fair and appropriate	_	Workforce model is sustainable and affordable; Financial position for the short and long term is sustainable	_	_
2016	_	Preventing crime, tackling anti-social behaviour and keeping people safe; Investigating crime and reducing re-offending; Protecting vulnerable people and supporting victims; Tackling serious and organised crime; Understands current and likely demand; Uses resources to meet current demand; Plan for demand in the future; Treating the public with fairness and respect; Behaviour of workforce is ethical and lawful; Force treats its workforce with fairness and respect	_	_	_	_
2017	_	Preventing crime, tackling anti-social behaviour and keeping people safe; Investigating crime and reducing re-offending; Protecting vulnerable people and supporting victims; Tackling serious and organised crime; Understands demand and uses resources to meet demand; Plan for demand in the future; Treating the public with fairness and respect; Behaviour of workforce is ethical and lawful; Force treats its workforce with fairness and respect	_	_	_	_
2018/19	_	Preventing crime, tackling anti-social behaviour and keeping people safe; Investigating crime and reducing re-offending; Protecting vulnerable people and supporting victims; Tackling serious and organised crime; Using resources to meet demand; Plan for the future; Treating the public with fairness and respect; Behaviour of workforce is ethical and lawful	_	_	_	_
2021/22	_	Preventing crime; Developing a positive workplace	Treatment of the public; Protecting vulnerable people; Managing offenders; Good use of resources	Investigating crime; Responding to the public	_	_

In December 2014, Dorset Police was criticised during a review by Her Majesty's Inspectorate of Constabulary (HMIC) for the way they investigated offences, with a backlog of cases in the Safeguarding Referral Unit. The report from that year found that whilst crime had continued to fall at a greater rate in Dorset than England and Wales, levels of victim satisfaction were slightly below average for some crimes.

In November 2022, a report by His Majesty's Inspectorate of Constabulary and Fire & Rescue Services (HMICFRS) was published about Dorset Police and seven other forces into their standards of vetting. It uncovered that due to poor vetting standards there could be 'hundreds, if not thousands, of corrupt police officers serving in England and Wales'.

== Alliances and merger proposals ==
In 2006 the Home Office announced plans to reduce the number of police forces in the UK from 42 to 24. This would have seen Dorset Police merge with Gloucestershire Constabulary, Devon and Cornwall Police, Avon and Somerset Constabulary and Wiltshire Police. The plans were publicly criticised by all the involved forces, stating that it would lead to poor quality service and a reduction in local policing. The merger plans were abandoned in August 2006 by the then Home Secretary, John Reid.

Devon and Cornwall Police and Dorset Police announced in December 2013 that their Chief Constables and PCCs were exploring opportunities for greater collaboration; to save costs without reducing service, and share assets, resources, expertise and best practice. Her Majesty's Inspectorate of Constabulary (HMIC) defines a strategic alliance as: "An agreement between two or more forces to pursue a set of agreed objectives, while retaining separate identities." A strategic alliance was agreed to in March 2015, covering over 30 administrative and operational business areas (almost 40% of the total activity of the two forces). These business areas include admin services, finance, human resources, fleet services and ICT, together with some specialist policing teams. The first joint teams became operational in April 2016. In each business area, there is a single team and management structure made up from people from both organisations, to work on behalf of both forces. Any costs and savings are shared in proportion to the size of each force. So far the strategic alliance project is on track to achieve the initial target of £12 million of combined annual savings by 2018.

In September 2017, it was announced that Dorset Police and Devon and Cornwall Police were looking at merging to form a single force. This was cancelled in October 2018 when the PCC for Devon and Cornwall was unwilling to submit the merger plans to the Home Office for consideration.

== Officers killed in the line of duty ==
The Police Roll of Honour Trust and Police Memorial Trust list and commemorate all British police officers killed in the line of duty. Since its establishment in 1984, the Police Memorial Trust has erected 50 memorials nationally to some of those officers.

Officers killed in the line of duty or who have died reporting for, on, or off duty (Bournemouth Borough Police, Dorset Constabulary and Dorset Police)
Name	Rank	Age	Force name at time	Date of death	Circumstances
Thomas Bishop	Constable	39	Dorset Constabulary	21 September 1877	Fatally bludgeoned with stones by a drunken man he had warned. The incident occurred in Bere Regis following the Woodbury Hill Fair.
Samuel Foster	Superintendent	51	Bournemouth Borough Police	6 August 1904	Collapsed and died while representing the force at the funeral of a colleague.
Sidney George Wood	Constable	27	Dorset Constabulary	26 April 1908	Died after crashing his bicycle on a steep hill searching for a thief
Thomas Biddlecombe	Constable	47	Dorset Constabulary	18 December 1916	Whilst patrolling Thornford Road, Sherborne, he took severely ill and was taken by ambulance to Yeatman Hospital where he died.
Wilfred Charles Viney	Constable	31	Dorset Constabulary	25 July 1930	Killed riding pillion in a motorcycle collision on plain clothes night patrol.
Sidney F. Loader	Constable	40	Dorset Constabulary	8 September 1938	Fatally injured in a collision with a car while on cycle patrol.
Alfred E. Head	Constable	46	Dorset Constabulary	19 October 1938	Fatally injured in a road collision cycling to court in bad weather.
Stanley Ivor Marsh	Constable	24	Dorset Constabulary	9 February 1939	Died as a result of injuries received in 1938 when he attempted to stop a car.
Walter Charles Billett	Reserve constable	61	Dorset Constabulary	5 July 1940	Killed in a fall from his bicycle while reporting for duty in the blackout.
Ronald Mayne Roffey	Sergeant	37	Bournemouth Borough Police	22 August 1956	Drowned attempting to rescue his daughter from the sea in Jersey.
Cecil Robert Budden	Constable	27	Dorset Constabulary	19 May 1957	Fatally injured in a collision with a car while on motorcycle patrol.
Kenneth Frederick Innell	Inspector	44	Dorset Police	13 December 1982	Collapsed and died during an incident on duty at Poole Quay.
Sean Oxford	Special constable	21	Dorset Police	7 May 1992	Collapsed and died during warm up exercises in preparation for self defence training.
Stephen Wilson	Constable	37	Dorset Police	16 May 1996	Fatally injured in a motorcycle collision while reporting for night duty.
Ian Leslie Toomer	Inspector	50	Dorset Police	20 April 1999	Killed in a road collision when his police car crashed in wet weather.
Robin Povall	Detective constable	50	Dorset Police	7 March 2003	While cycling home from duty at Weymouth he was in a collision with a car that had cut across his path. He sustained serious injuries from which he died a few hours later in hospital.
Ian James Morton	Detective constable	32	Dorset Police	26 October 2008	Killed in a road traffic collision whilst travelling to report for duty at Bournemouth, in the early morning, when his vehicle left the road and crashed into the wall of a bungalow at Highcliffe.
Jonathan Mark Hicken	Detective constable	47	Dorset Police	6 October 2019	Collapsed and died while travelling to duty.

== In popular culture ==
- The 2006 book Bobbies on the Beat: 150 Years of the Dorset Police by Melvin Hann presents the history of the Dorset Police Force to mark the 150th anniversary.
- The 2018 book Operation Countryman: The Flawed Enquiry into London Police Corruption by former Metropolitan Police officer Kirby Dick, discusses Operation Countryman, an investigation into police corruption in London in the late 1970s, on which then Home Secretary, Merlyn Rees, appointed Dorset Police to investigate. The investigation was led by then Dorset Police Chief Constable, Arthur Hambleton, to which Dick describes in his book as 'shambolic'.
- In March 2017, an episode of The Kyle Files, presented by Jeremy Kyle, featured the No Excuse and Traffic unit. The 30-minute documentary featured Kyle joining the units on patrol, focusing on the dangers at the wheel, such as drink and drug driving, mobile phone use, speeding and Operation Dragoon, Dorset Police's approach to tackling the most dangerous road users.The episode was filmed in October 2016 and aired on ITV on 6 March 2017.
- In October 2017, Gordon Ramsay's documentary Gordon Ramsay on Cocaine, featured Ramsay joining the Traffic Unit on patrol in Bournemouth, for a special operation to tackle the issue of drug driving. The episode was filmed in April 2017 and the two-part programme aired on ITV on 19 and 26 October 2017.
- The TV series Broadchurch is about police detectives investigating crimes in a small town in Dorset, although the police force in the series is fictionalized and referred to as "Wessex Police".

== See also ==
- Law enforcement in the United Kingdom
- List of law enforcement agencies in the United Kingdom, Crown Dependencies and British Overseas Territories
- Murder of Heather Barnett (a murder that occurred in the Charminster area of Bournemouth by convicted serial killer Danilo Restivo)
- Murder of Jong-Ok Shin (a murder that occurred in the Charminster area of Bournemouth. Omar Benguit was convicted after a second re-trial. It has been suspected the killer may have been Danilo Restivo)
- Killing of Claire Parry (Parry died in Parley after her neck was compressed by serving Police Constable Timothy Brehmer after he feared she'd inform his wife of their affair)
- Murder of Thomas Roberts (Roberts was murdered in Bournemouth by convicted murderer Lawangeen Abdulrahimzai, who had previously killed two men by shooting them with a Kalisnikov rifle in Serbia)
- Murder of Sir Richard Sutton (Sutton was murdered near Gillingham by his step-son, Thomas Schreiber, who also attempted to murder his mother, Anne Schreiber)
- Operation Hornbill (an operation to identify a person blackmailing Tesco, threatening to harm customers if their demands—for Clubcards, modified so that the holder could withdraw cash from ATMs—were not met)
- Operation Countryman (an operation into police corruption in London in the late 1970s, led by Dorset Police)
