= Salisbury Law Courts =

Judicial building in Salisbury, England

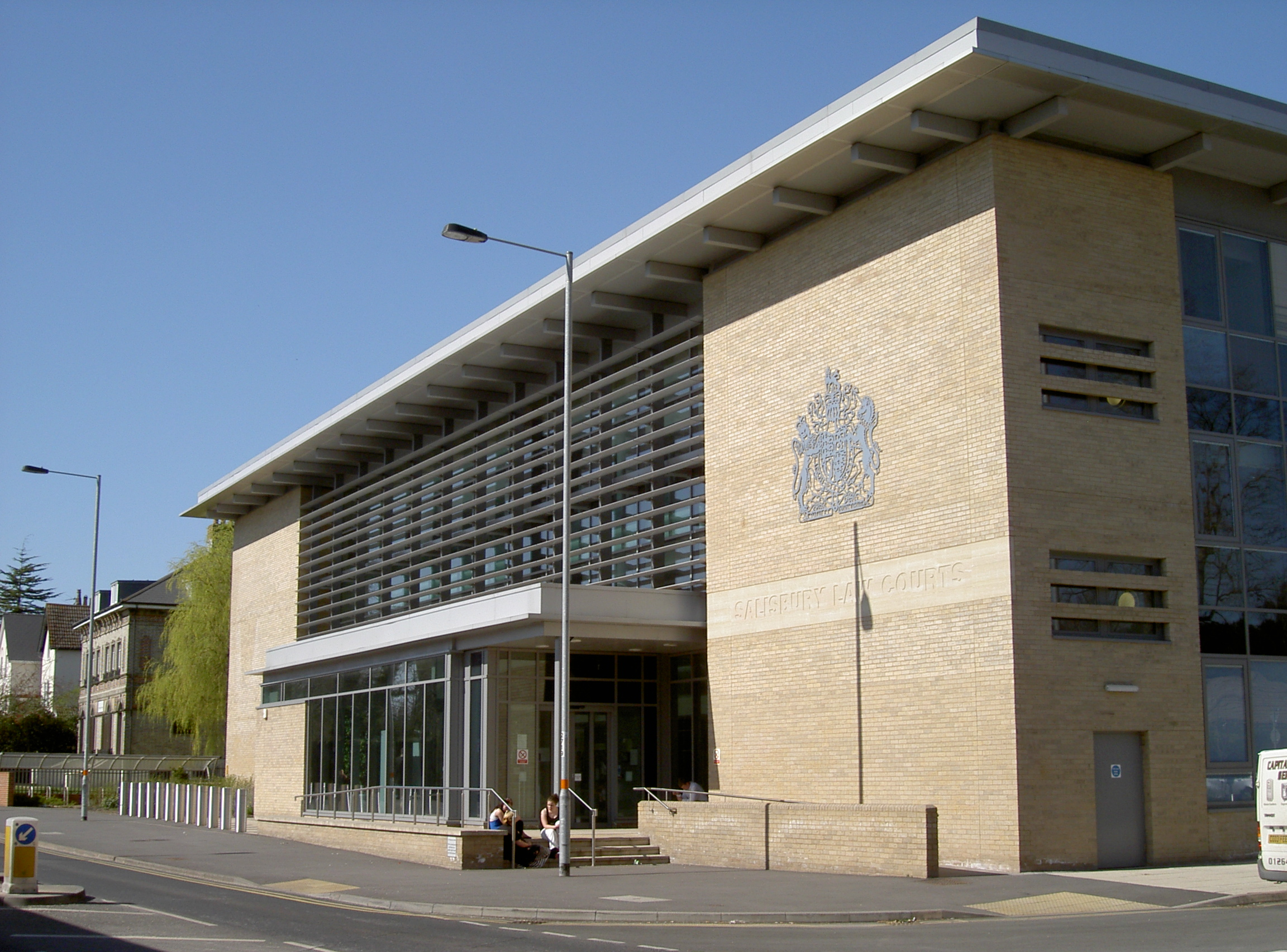
- Salisbury Law Courts

- Shown in Wiltshire
- 51.0734°N 1.8104°W
- Location: Wilton Road, Salisbury

History
- Built: 2009
- Built by: Mansall Construction

Site notes
- Architect(s): Stride Teglown / Feilden & Mawson
- Architectural style: Modernist style

Salisbury Law Courts is a Crown Court venue, which deals with criminal cases, and a County Court venue, which deals with civil cases, in Wilton Road, Salisbury, England. It also accommodates the local magistrates' court.

== History ==
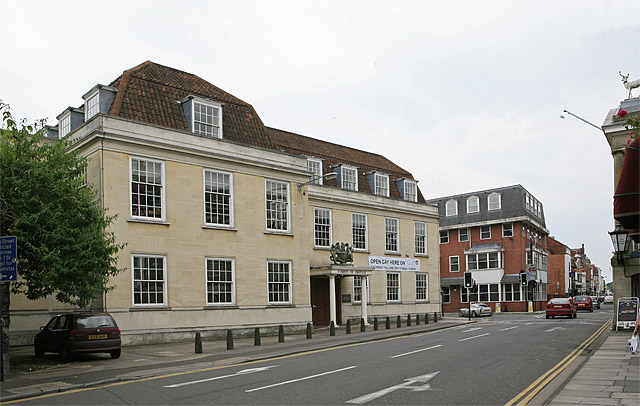
Alexandra House in St John's Street

All magistrates' court hearings in Salisbury were originally held in the courtroom in the west wing of Salisbury Guildhall. Additional judicial facilities, to accommodate the crown and county courts, were established in Alexandra House in St John's Street in the mid-1980s. (Note: Alexandra house was designed by Ernest Joseph in the Neo-Georgian style, built with a stucco finish and opened as a NAAFI building in the 1950s.) However, as the number of court cases in Salisbury grew, it became necessary to commission a more modern courthouse to accommodate the crown and county courts as well as the magistrates' court. The site selected by the Lord Chancellor's Department, on the north side of Wilton Road, had been occupied by the recreation ground for the Old Manor Hospital which had closed in 2003.

Work on the new building started in October 2007. It was designed by Stride Teglown / Feilden & Mawson in the Modernist style, built in buff brick and glass by Mansall Construction at a cost of £18 million, and was officially opened in September 2009. The design involved a symmetrical main frontage in three sections facing onto Wilton Road. The central section of eleven bays featured a single-storey entrance block, which was projected forward and accessed by a glass sliding doorway at the right-hand end. The first floor was fenestrated by a row of glass panels which were fronted by a slatted structure which was projected forward. The end sections were slightly projected forward and faced entirely with buff brick with no fenestration. A Royal coat of arms was mounted on the right-hand end section at first floor level. At roof level, the building featured prominent modillioned eaves. Internally, the building was laid out to accommodate six courtrooms. The project was awarded first prize under the courts scheme at the BREEAM Awards 2010.

Notable cases have included the trial and conviction of an Afghan man, Lawangeen Abdulrahimzai, in January 2023, for the murder of an aspiring Royal Marine, Thomas Roberts; he had already killed two other men in Serbia.
