= Murder of Jong-Ok Shin =

2002 English murder case

- Location: Charminster, Bournemouth, Dorset, England
- Date: 12 July 2002; 24 years ago Approximately 02:50 BST
- Attack type: Stabbing
- Weapon: Knife
- Victim: Jong-Ok Shin
- Convicted: Omar Benguit

== Background ==
At 02.50 on 12 July 2002, 26-year-old Jong-Ok Shin, a South Korean international student, was fatally stabbed in Bournemouth, England while walking home from a discotheque. On 22 August 2002 Omar Benguit was arrested for the offence and on 31 January 2005, after two previous trials on 13 July 2003 and 5 April 2004 had resulted in hung juries, Benguit was found guilty of Shin’s murder and sentenced to life imprisonment. He has maintained his innocence from the time of his arrest and a campaign run by his sister Amie argues that he was wrongfully convicted.

Shin was stabbed while walking home along Malmesbury Park Road in Charminster, Bournemouth after a night out with friends at the Elements nightclub. She died of her injuries less than an hour later at a hospital. Her final words as reported by a doctor were that her attacker was "a man wearing a mask who ran away". With no immediate suspect, Dorset Police launched a public appeal. Several weeks later, a local woman known for legal reasons as 'BB' implicated Benguit while being interviewed for shoplifting, which led to Benguit being charged with murdering Shin. Nicholas Gbadamosi was charged with assisting him and both were also charged with raping 'BB' after the murder. 'BB' became the chief witness for the prosecution.

At the first trial on 13 July 2003, the jury failed to reach verdicts in relation to the murder, but Gbadamosi was cleared of rape. At a retrial in 2004, Benguit was acquitted of rape and Gbadamosi was acquitted of assisting in the murder, but the jury could not reach a verdict on the murder charge against Benguit. A third trial commenced on 18 January 2005, when Benguit was convicted of Shin's murder and sentenced to life imprisonment.

=== Jong-Ok Shin ===
Jong-Ok Shin (Korean: 신정옥) was born in early July 1976 in South Korea, where she completed a university degree in trade and commerce. She travelled to the United Kingdom in November 2001 to improve her English. She enrolled at the Anglo European School of English on Lansdowne Road and lived in the nearby Charminster area. She was known as "Oki" to friends.

During her time in Bournemouth, Shin worked part-time at a bank and at a local hotel. Friends and teachers described her as kind, hard-working, and well-liked by other students. She celebrated her 26th birthday with friends and her host family a week before her death.

Her parents, Tae Yeon Bae and Jong Geun Shin, had hoped she would return to South Korea in the near future. Her death prompted widespread sympathy both in the United Kingdom and South Korea.

=== Omar Benguit ===
Omar Benguit (Arabic: عمر بن غيث) was born 1972 or 1973 in Morocco. He moved to the United Kingdom as a child, receiving British citizenship and later living in Hampshire and Dorset. Before his arrest, he was living in Bournemouth and had a history of drug addiction and minor criminal offences, which featured prominently in the prosecution’s case.

Since conviction, his case has since attracted attention from campaigners and journalists who argue that another individual, convicted murderer Danilo Restivo, may have been responsible for the killing. The CCRC has stated that it continues to consider the case.

== Murder ==
On the evening of 11 July 2002, Jong-Ok Shin went out with friends in Bournemouth and left a nightclub called Elements shortly after 02:00 on 12 July to return home. In Malmesbury Park Road, a quiet side-street off Charminster Road, she parted from a friend and continued to walk on alone. At 02:50 she was attacked from behind and stabbed three times. Neighbours summoned emergency services and Shin was taken to Poole Hospital, where she died at 03:40 on 12 July 2002. Before losing consciousness she told police and medical staff that her attacker was a man wearing a mask who ran away. A Home Office pathologist concluded that Shin had been stabbed three times in the back with considerable force, fracturing ribs and causing fatal internal bleeding. She had no defensive injuries, indicating a surprise attack from behind.

The murder prompted public sympathy and media attention in Bournemouth. Flowers and messages were left near the scene, and local officials expressed condolences to Shin’s family and the South Korean student community. The director of the Anglo-European School of English, where Shin had been studying, described her as “a very nice girl” and said the school was cooperating fully with police inquiries.

Shin’s funeral took place on 27 July 2002 at the Sacred Heart Church (Bournemouth Oratory) and was attended by family members, police officers, and members of the local community. Her remains were cremated privately at Bournemouth Crematorium before being repatriated to South Korea.

== Investigation ==
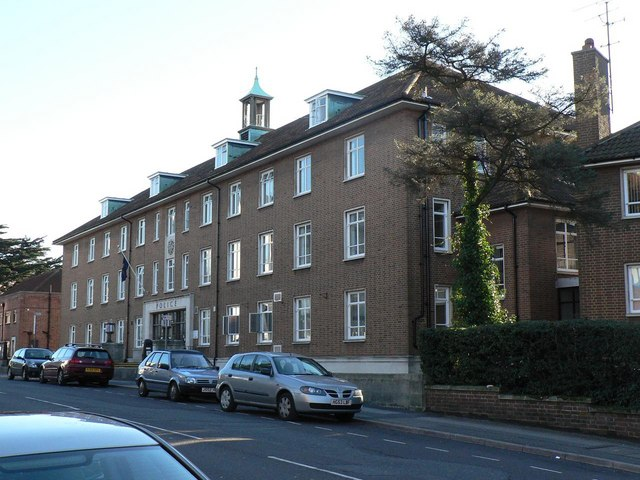
Bournemouth police station, where the investigation was based

The investigation was led by Detective Superintendent Pete Jackson of Dorset Police, who was assisted by the main investigating officers DS 391 Kevin Connolly and DC 694 Mark Prince. More than 300 officers took part in the inquiry, which was coordinated from an incident room at Bournemouth police station. Police ruled out robbery or sexual assault as motives, as Shin's handbag and phone were near her body. They established that she had been stabbed from behind with a single-edged knife 15 cm long with a curved tip that was never recovered.

Initial attention focused on individuals known to Shin, including a former boyfriend who was arrested and later released without charge. Witnesses described hearing an argument near the scene between the victim and a man with a foreign accent and a vehicle making a U-turn shortly after the attack (which was later attributed to a neighbour), but there was no forensic or CCTV evidence available to identify a suspect.

Dorset Police conducted extensive appeals for information in Bournemouth’s nightlife areas and offered reassurance to foreign students after the killing attracted attention from the South Korean Embassy. Shin’s parents travelled to the United Kingdom and joined detectives at a press conference to appeal for witnesses. In mid-August 2002, the non-profit Crimestoppers offered a £10,000 reward for information leading to the killer’s arrest. Despite extensive forensic and investigative work, no direct link to a suspect was established during the first weeks of the investigation. The inquiry later expanded to consider local drug users and transient offenders in the Bournemouth area.

=== Key witness and subsequent arrests ===
On 1 August 2002, a local woman known for legal reasons as "BB" indicated during an interview for shoplifting that Omar Benguit, Nicholas Gbadamosi and a third man, who was thought to be Delroy Woolry, had been involved in the killing. Her account was that she had been driving Benguit, Gbadamosi and Woolry in her car to a crack house when they spotted Shin walking home. The three men jumped out and accosted Shin before running back to the car. Benguit had blood on his t-shirt and Gbadamosi was said to have exclaimed to Benguit "What the fuck have you done?" She also claimed that as the men wanted to buy crack, she took them to a crack house and afterwards the three men raped her using red-handled pliers in the act. Benguit's clothes were put into a carrier bag and thrown into the river Stour at Iford Bridge.

Police arrested Benguit on 22 August 2002 and charged him with Shin’s murder; and on 27 August 2002 Gbadamosi was arrested and charged for assisting Benguit in that offence. Both men were also charged with raping BB.

Delroy Woolry was interviewed but not charged with any offence and was deported by Dorset police on 5 September 2002 – contrary to the CCRC’s statement of reasons dated 19 December 2012, when referring Benguit’s conviction to the Court of Appeal for his second appeal, that he had “fled the country”.

BB's evidence was central to the prosecution’s case, but no forensic evidence linked the accused to the murder or the rape.

== Legal proceedings ==
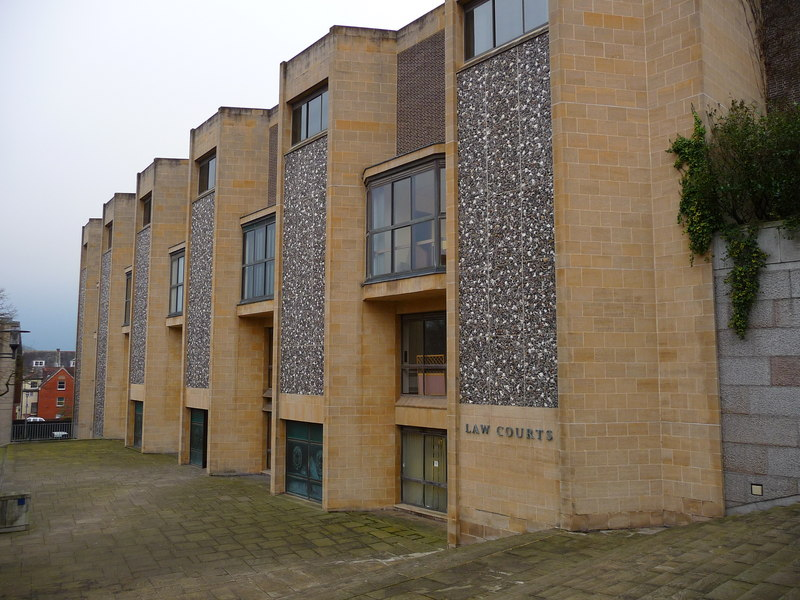
Benguit's trials were held at Winchester Crown Court

Benguit was tried three times at Winchester Crown Court for the murder of Shin. Each trial attracted close media and diplomatic attention, with a representative from the South Korean Embassy attending throughout. The prosecution argued that Benguit had shown a sexual interest in women of East Asian appearance and attacked Shin after seeing her walking alone. The defence led by Mr Oba Nsugbe KC maintained that there was no physical or forensic evidence linking him to the murder and challenged the reliability of the witness testimony presented by the prosecution, but he did not however consider the issue of CCTV.

=== First trial ===
The first trial held on 13 July 2003 ended with the jury unable to reach a verdict on the charge of murder.

=== Second trial ===
A retrial on 5 April 2004 also concluded without a verdict being reached against Benguit regarding Shin’s murder, although he was found not guilty of raping BB.

=== Third trial ===
The third trial began on 18 January 2005 after permission for it had been granted by the then Director of Public Prosecutions, Kenneth Macdonald QC - an unusual step after two hung juries. The trial was held at Winchester Crown Court and presided over by Mrs Justice Heather Hallett and resulted in Benguit’s unanimous conviction for murder on 31 January 2005. The prosecution relied once again on the testimony of witnesses from Bournemouth’s drug community, including 'BB,' whose accounts were inconsistent but accepted by the jury. The defence continued to argue that there was no forensic or physical evidence linking Benguit to the attack, but again failed to address the question of CCTV.

Mrs Justice Hallett, in her sentencing remarks, said Benguit had been “fuelled by drink and crack cocaine” and described the attack as “gratuitous violence.” She said that according to the evidence she had heard, Benguit was a “nasty piece of work” and she sentenced him to life imprisonment with a minimum term of 20 years.

Following the verdict, senior investigating officers described Benguit as a dangerous offender who was motivated by sexual desires to murder Shin and they expressed their satisfaction that justice had been achieved on behalf of Shin’s family.

=== First appeal ===
Following Benguit’s conviction for murder on 31 January 2005, leave to appeal was granted on 20 May 2005. The appeal was dismissed on 12 July 2005 on the basis that it was not unfair for Benguit to have faced three trials; and although the CPS failed to apply in advance to admit bad character evidence, which suggested that in the weeks leading up to the crime, Benguit was alleged to have possessed a knife identical in size and shape to the murder weapon and therefore was a person who carried a knife, the conviction was held to be safe.

=== First application to the CCRC ===
On 10 May 2010, Benguit applied for a review by the Criminal Cases Review Commission (CCRC). based upon BB's credibility and CCTV which had cast a doubt on whether her car was in the vicinity of the crime. A further submission was later made in regard to Danilo Restivo being an alternative suspect, after he had been convicted of murdering Heather Barnett on 29 June 2011. The CCRC referred the case back to the Court of Appeal on 20 December 2012.

=== Second appeal ===
On 9 April 2014 Benguit’s appeal was dismissed. It considered the submission that Danilo Restivo — a convicted double-murderer — may have been responsible for the Shin's murder and arguments about the credibility of ‘BB’ who had appeared on a Jeremy Kyle programme to say that she had actually seen Benguit stab Shin, whereas she had previously stated that she had remained in her car. The Court concluded that Benguit was fairly convicted according to the evidence and that the conviction of Danilo Restivo, who had mutilated his victims, whereas Shin had only been stabbed in the back, did not undermine the safety of the conviction.

Despite the dismissal of this 2nd appeal, there continued to be speculation that Benguit was wrongly convicted. In 2021 BBC Three broadcast a documentary having obtained from Dorset police a short colour extract from a CCTV recording, which showed specific images of a person seen at 03.20 outside a telephone box in Charminster Road, whom the police had previously conceded resembled Benguit, but had been wrongly stated by the investigating officer to have been wearing a baseball cap. The clearer colour footage showed however that the person was in fact bald-headed - as was Benguit.

=== Second application to the CCRC ===
On 4 May 2021 Benguit made a second application to the CCRC following the programme. The CCRC said that it would review the case again to determine whether there was significant fresh evidence to refer the case back to the Court of Appeal. The application is still pending as at September 2026.

== Alternative suspect theory ==
Some campaigners and commentators have suggested that Danilo Restivo - who was convicted of the murders of Heather Barnett in England and Elisa Claps in Italy - was responsible for Shin’s murder. Dorset Police were aware of Restivo's possible significance during their investigation, having been notified by telex from the Italian police on 5 August 2002 that he was a "grave danger to women" and the possibility of his involvement has been raised in the media on numerous occasions, because a clump of hair was found on the pavement where Shin was initially stabbed. The Court of Appeal at Benguit's second appeal on 9 April 2014 had however considered arguments about the proximity of Restivo's home to the scene of the crime and alleged similarities between all three murders and concluded that they did not undermine the safety of Benguit’s conviction, as the evidential record as a whole provided significant circumstantial support for the jury’s verdict.

== Subsequent developments ==
=== 2026 Panorama investigation ===
In February 2026, BBC News released an article detailing evidence obtained through a Panorama investigation, which suggests that Dorset Police framed Benguit for the murder. Various prosecution witnesses told the BBC they were pressured by police into signing statements and some admitted in interviews that they lied in court. The phone record of the call that the person made from the telephone box was found to have been made to Delroy Woolry, a drug dealer who had Benguit’s mobile number in his diary. The CCTV obtained by the BBC from Dorset police in 2021 was said to support the alibi that Benguit gave when first interviewed by the police on 22 August 2002, that he had been walking home in the early hours of the morning of 12 July 2002 after a night out on the town.

He had told the interviewing officer that he recalled seeing the streets around the crime scene opposite the telephone box blocked off and that “if you look at the police tapes, you should see me walking home at that time”. The person whom the police conceded “was possibly Benguit”, who made the call to Benguit's drug dealer and could be seen walking in the direction of Benguit’s home, was never identified by the police as being anybody else. If it was Benguit and he was walking home from the town centre, then according to the programme he could not have been involved in the crime, as Benguit could not at the same time have been at the crack house several miles away with blood on his t-shirt and later raping BB as alleged, while his clothes were also thrown into the river.

=== Commentary and criticism ===
Media and academic sources have occasionally questioned aspects of the police investigation, including the handling of witnesses and reliance on circumstantial evidence. A 2015 article by Marika Henneberg and Barry Loveday in the *British Journal of American Legal Studies* examined the case in the context of investigative bias and tunnel vision, arguing that further review could be warranted.

=== Television ===
- The Jury Room – Episode 6 of the 2017 CBS Reality series presented by Will Hanrahan, in which a jury of twelve members of the public re-examined the case of Omar Benguit. The programme concluded with the jury finding him “not guilty” of the murder of Jong-Ok Shin.
- Unsolved: The Man With No Alibi – A six-part BBC Three documentary series broadcast in 2018, presented by journalist Bronagh Munro, which re-examined the circumstances of Benguit’s conviction and featured interviews with his family and witnesses.
- Unsolved: An Alibi for Omar – A follow-up BBC Three documentary broadcast in 2021, again presented by Munro, exploring newly discovered material connected to the case.
- Panorama: Framed for Murder - BBC Panorama documentary broadcast February 2026. Presented by Bronagh Munro featuring apologies from some witnesses who had lied. All witnesses shown to be untrustworthy. Omar's alibi corroborated by CCTV. Dorset Police accused of framing Omar Benguit.

=== Life in prison ===
While on remand awaiting trial, Benguit was reportedly assaulted several times by other inmates. Benguit has served his sentence in several high-security prisons, including HM Prison Wakefield and HM Prison Long Lartin. In August 2017, while at Wakefield, Benguit was stabbed by fellow prisoner Stuart Hazell, who had been convicted of the murder of Tia Sharp. Benguit was later transferred to Long Lartin for his safety.

=== Books ===
- Guilty Until Proven Innocent by Jon Robins (2018, Biteback Publishing, ISBN 9781785903694) – A non-fiction work examining alleged miscarriages of justice in the British legal system, including the Benguit case.
