= Operation Countryman =

Investigation into police corruption in London from 1978 to 1982

Operation Countryman was an investigation into police corruption in London in the late 1970s. The operation was conducted between 1978 and 1982 at a total cost of £3 million and led to eight police officers being prosecuted, although none were convicted. The initial allegations of corruption were made by a supergrass who claimed that some officers, including members of the elite Flying Squad which dealt with commercial armed robberies, were receiving bribes from criminals in return for warnings of imminent police raids or arrests, the fabrication of evidence against innocent men, and having charges against guilty criminals dropped.

The investigation initially targeted officers within the City of London Police but spread to include the Metropolitan Police based at Scotland Yard. Codenamed Operation Countryman because of its use of officers from so-called 'rural' police forces of Hampshire and Dorset, the investigating team came to be disparagingly known by London officers as "The Sweedy." The investigation was ordered by the then Home Secretary Merlyn Rees, and began by examining police activity around three major crimes:

- a £175,000 payroll robbery at the offices of the Daily Express newspaper in 1976
- a £225,000 robbery outside the headquarters of Williams & Glyn's Bank, London, in 1977
- a £200,000 payroll robbery at the offices of the Daily Mirror newspaper in 1978. During this robbery, Antonio Castro, a 38-year-old guard working for Security Express, was shot and killed.

As the investigation proceeded, it began to emerge that the corruption was not limited to "a few bad apples" within the forces but was "historically and currently endemic" and "widespread throughout the hierarchical command rather than confined to those below the rank of sergeant."

In August 1978, officers began investigations into corruption within the London police services. The unit was initially accommodated at Camberwell police station in south London, but following attempts to interfere with the team's documents, records and evidence, it was moved to Godalming Police Station in Surrey, outside the Metropolitan Police District.

Operation Countryman faced major obstruction from both senior management and the lower ranks of the police. Much of the investigation's evidence was obtained by police officers going undercover as police officers.

Asst. Chief Constable Leonard Burt told his investigation team not to pass any evidence it obtained against Metropolitan Police officers to the Met Commissioner, David McNee. Shortly before his retirement in February 1980, the Chief Constable of Dorset Police, Arthur Hambleton, the superior of Burt, made allegations that Countryman had been wilfully obstructed by Commissioner McNee and Director of Public Prosecutions Sir Thomas Hetherington. In May 1980 Leonard Burt returned to Dorset Police and responsibility for Countryman passed to Sir Peter Matthews, Chief Constable of Surrey Constabulary. He ordered that all evidence already compiled during the investigation be passed to the Metropolitan Police to be dealt with by their own internal investigation unit.

After six years, and at a cost of over £4 million, Operation Countryman presented its findings to the Home Office and the Commissioner. Parts of the report were leaked to the public. Dale Campbell-Savours said that "over 250 police officers were forced to resign and many faced criminal charges after investigations revealed that police membership of particular Masonic lodges formed the nucleus of a criminal conspiracy."

Questions asked in the British Parliament have, on several occasions, called on the Home Secretary to release the findings of Operation Countryman, but such requests have been refused as these are protected by public interest immunity.

== See also ==
- Operation Tiberius
- Hugh Moore (police officer)
